= Hello Darling (disambiguation) =

Hello Darling is a 2010 Bollywood comedy film.

Hello Darling may also refer to:

- Hello Darling (1975 film), a 1975 Indian Malayalam film
- Hello Darling (play), a 2017 comedy drama play by Mir Muneer
- "Hello Darlin'" (song), a 1970 song by Conway Twitty
- Allo Darlin', a British indie pop band

== See also ==
- Hello Darlin' (disambiguation)
