= Shilpi Sharma (actress) =

Indian actress, fashion designer and model

- Born: Shilpi Sharma; New Delhi, India
- Occupations: Actress, model, fashion Designer
- Years active: 2001–present
- Website: shilpisharma.in

Shilpi Sharma is an Indian actress, fashion designer and model born in New Delhi, India. She is the winner of several awards including the prestigious SIIMA awards 2015. She is working in Telugu, Kannada and Malayalam languages.

== Early life and education ==
Shilpi Sharma graduated with a Bachelor of Science, specializing in textile design/fabrics, from the Institute of Home Economics at the University of Delhi. She also did her professional fashion designing course from the National Institute of Fashion Technology, Delhi. She attended acting workshops under Nadira Babbar, Juhu, Mumbai.

== Career ==
=== Modeling ===
In 2006 Sharma began her career by participating in the beauty contest, "Miss Delhi Teen Queen". In 2010, she participated in the "Citadel Miss Pune" competition. In 2012, Sharma competed in the "Femina Miss India" - State Pageant and won "Miss Body Beautiful" and "Miss Beautiful Smile". Later, she moved to Mumbai and was very active in modeling. She did print advertisement and commercials for Pantaloons, Vicks, Icici bank, Lg electronics, Sambhav Diamonds, Utsav Cz gold jewellery, Moiaa Saree (with her own name Shilpi Sharma), Crysbro chicken, secure wrap, Violet Sarees, Camouflaage fashions, Collezioni Moda, Chandra Modern Builders, Aabushan, Citylife retail, Bombay Dyeing etc. and walked the ramp for Hyderabad fashion week, Jaipur International Fashion Week, etc. She did a campaign shoot for Lakme Fashion Week for designer Sabbah Sharma and editorial shoots for celebrity designer Archana Kochhar. Sharma modeled for Neeru Kumar, leading textile designer with traditional techniques and indigenous materials. She has appeared on the covers of various magazines including Woman's Era, Grihashobha, swatipublications.in, Health, New Woman, etc.

=== Public figure ===
Sharma has launched, initiated and has been part of several projects where she actively promoted and advocated women's and child's welfare. She is an advocate of women's betterment. She has also launched first pet Magazine Hyderabad PAWS along with actors Siddharth (actor) and Charmee Kaur. The event Khwaaish was initiated/launched by her in 2014, supporting new women designers across India, held in Taj Krishna, Hyderabad. It had 130 women designers involved in this, designers coming from all over India. Apart from that, she has launched Samsung electronics in Hyderabad City, Alma Soprano (the new you) cosmetic clinic etc. She also launched the Bodypark gym and spa in Vizag recently, the largest gym and spa in Vizag.

=== Fashion designing ===
Shilpi Sharma has ventured into fashion designing besides acting and modelling.

=== Television ===
Sharma played the role of Kajal in Kahani Chandrakanta Ki, directed and produced by Sunil Agnihotri, which is sequel of the super hit TV serial Chandrakanta, aired on DD National. Kahani Chandrakanta Ki was aired on Sahara One.

She debuted in the Telugu film Green Signal as one of the leads in 2014, produced by Maruthi. She played the lead role in the Kannada movie Aakramana. movie in Kannada. Aakramana dubbed in Hindi, Telugu and Tamil.

== Awards and recognitions ==
Sharma was the star attraction at the finals of the Vodafone Sirmur Cup Polo tournament 2015, held in Jaipur. Apparently, the actress was invited by Her Highness Rajmata Padmini Devi of Jaipur, and Sharma was all more excited with the warm welcome. Inaugurated by Rajasthan Chief Minister Vasundhara Raje, Sharma turned as the Chief Guest for the event and gave away the prizes for the winners.

Sharma was awarded/honoured at the 7th GFFN in the young achiever's category.

Sharma won the "Best Debutant Female" SIIMA Awards Kannada Held in Dubai on 6 August 2015.

- Honoured at 9th Nashik international film festival (NIFF 2017), Nashik, Maharashtra.
- Actress Award - BCR Achievers 2017, New Delhi
- Women's Achievement Awards 2017 (Actress) - IHRC - International Human Rights Commission, Bangalore.
- Best actress award presented by AMIM cancer trust - December 2018.

=== Humanitarian work ===
Shilpi Sharma has been appointed as the youth ambassador for peace and humanity from India by IHRC.

Year	Award	Category	Film	Result	Ref
2015	SIIMA Awards Kannada	Best Debutant Female	Aakramana in 2D and 3D	Won	
2014	7th GFFN Award				

== Filmography ==
=== Films ===
Year	Film	Role	Language	Note
2014	Green Signal	Devika	Telugu	Telugu debut
2014	Aakramana	Kaveri	Kannada	Kannada debut
2014	Current Theega	Item number	Telugu	Special appearance
2017	Thrissivaperoor Kliptham	Nilina Mehndi	Malayalam	Malayalam debut

=== Television ===
Year	Title	Role	Language
2011–12	Kahani Chandrakanta Ki	Kajal	Hindi

=== Music videos ===
- Paiyana Ponna with Johan Anthony (2016)
- Tu Mileya with Aariv Gill (2017)

== See also ==
- List of Indian film actresses
