= Betaal Pachisi (TV series) =

Indian television series

- Shahbaz Khan as Betaal
- Genre: Fantasy
- Based on: The Phantom by Lee Falk
- Directed by: Sunil Agnihotri
- Opening theme: "Ye To Hai Betaal"
- Country of origin: India
- Original language: Hindi
- No. of episodes: 49

Production
- Running time: 45 minutes
- Production company: DD National

Original release
- Network: DD Metro
- Release: 26 May 1997 – 1998

Betaal Pachisi is an Indian television series based on the comic strip The Phantom. The 49-episode Hindi series originally ran from 1997 to 1998 on DD Metro. It was directed by Sunil Agnihotri and starred Shahbaz Khan, Sonu Walia, Puneet Issar, Tom Alter and Vindu Dara Singh.

== Cast ==
- Shahbaz Khan as Betaal
- A. K. Hangal as Baba
- Tom Alter as CID Officer Harry
- Sonu Walia as TV reporter
- Vindu Dara Singh as Zulmato
- Puneet Issar as Kabira (Main antagonist) aka Danav Samrat
- Krutika Desai Khan as Naina Jogan
- Nimai Bali as Teja
- Shiva Rindani as Hiboo/Evu Jingora
- Mac Mohan as Mackie
- Shehzad Khan as Shahdie
- Sudhir as Bash
- Mamik Singh
- Sagar Salunke
- Arjun as Akai Thilusm
- Rajendra Gupta as Felix the Don / Professor
- Deep Dhillon as Jakaali
- Javed Khan as Forest Officer
- Akhilendra Mishra as Kroor Singh
- Reena Wadhwa as Maharani Kakooti
- Tinnu Anand as Alex the Don
- Polly as ET
- Surendra Pal as Zulmato's sidekick
- Archana Joglekar as Nagin
- Daman Maan as Jadugar Garsha
- Usha Bachani as Rajkumari Ballari
- Vinod Kapoor
- Hemant Birje as Tarzan
- Smita kalpavriksha as Witch

== Controversy ==
The show faced a lawsuit when King Features Syndicate filed a case arguing that Sunil Agnihotri had copied the idea of The Phantom comic strips for the Betaal series. However, the court ruled that only the unique expression of an idea could be protected, not the idea itself.
