= Raja Chaudhary =

Indian television actor (born 1975)

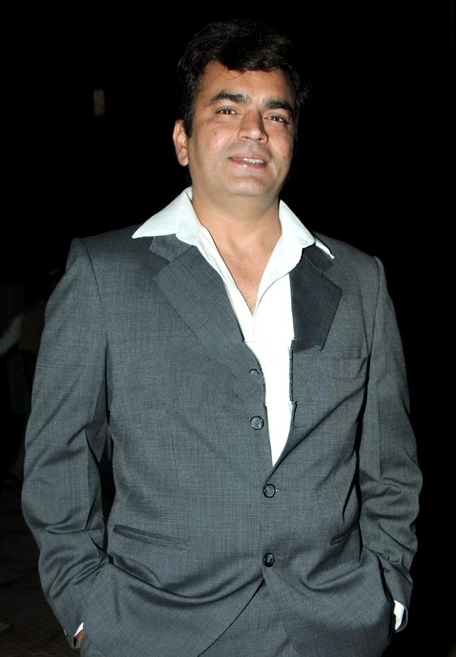
- Chaudhary in 2013
- Education: Asian Academy of Film & Television
- Occupations: Actor; writer; producer
- Years active: 1997–present
- Notable work: Bigg Boss 2
- Spouses: Shweta Tiwari (m. 1998; div. 2012) Shveta Sood (m. 2015; div. 2022)
- Children: 1

Raja Chaudhary (born 23 July 1974) is an Indian television actor, writer and producer based in Mumbai. He predominantly works in the Bhojpuri cinema. In 2008, Chaudhary participated as a contestant on Colors TV's reality show Bigg Boss, where he emerged as the first runner up.

== Career ==
Chaudhary played a villain role in the Bhojpuri film Saiyyan Hamar Hindustani opposite Shweta Tiwari. He gained fame during his stint at the Hindi reality show Bigg Boss 2 where he was a runner up. He then participated in another reality show Zor Ka Jhatka: Total Wipe Out.

Chaudhary has also acted in many television serials Your Honour, Daddy Samjha Karo, Chandramukhi, Aane Wala Pal, period Indian fantasy series Kahani Chandrakanta Ki and Adaalat . He was also featured in a TV serial called Black (loosely based on Hollywood Omen) on 9X Channel, directed by Sunil Agnihotri.

== Personal life ==
Chaudhary is an alumnus of Asian Academy of Film & Television. He married television actress, Shweta Tiwari in 1998, the couple had a daughter together, Palak Tiwari. The couple featured together in season 2 of the reality dance show, Nach Baliye. The couple later separated after Tiwari filed for divorce in 2007 ending their nine years in marriage. In 2015, he married Shveta Sood, a Delhi based corporate professional.

== Filmography ==
=== Films ===
Year	Title	Role	Notes
2003	Market	Appa Rao	
2011	Black Friday	Vikram	
2012	Daal Mein kuch Kaala Hai	Kamaal	
2013	Meridian Lines	Rajiv	
2018	Rasik Balma	Rajeev	
2020	Dabang Daroga	Inspector Vijay Rathore	

=== Television ===
Year	Title	Role	Notes
2007	Nach Baliye 2	Contestant	6th place
2007–2009	Chandramukhi	Ranbir Singh	
2008	Bigg Boss 2	Contestant	1st runner-up
2011	Zor Ka Jhatka: Total Wipeout	Contestant	
2012	Kahani Chandrakanta Ki	Bhavani Singh	
2012	Adaalat	Suraj Rathod	
2018	Tenali Rama	Dimdima	
2023–2024	Kaisa Hai Yeh Rishta Anjaana	Bhola Singh	
2025	Tenali Rama	Chaudapa Raya	
