= List of Hindi horror shows =

This is a list of notable Hindi horror shows.

Year of Premiere	Name	Notes	Production company	Channel
1993	Zee Horror Show(later titled Anhonee)	Zee Horror Show was a very popular program in the 90s. It featured short stories in the form of 4 to 5 episodes, each one based on suspense and horror.	Ramsay Brothers	Zee TV
1995	Aahat	The first season was mostly a crime thriller-whodunit with only occasional episodes on the supernatural. After the first season, each story focused on a different aspect of paranormal activity.	Fireworks Productions	Sony
1995	Mano Ya Na Mano	The series features episodic horror/thriller stories based on supernatural beliefs. Each story is portrayed in a fabricated and dramatic representation based on mystic and paranormal convictions. Besides, each story is shot in a different location and consists of a different star cast.	Balaji Telefilms	Zee TV
1997	Saturday Suspense	Each episode of the series was 1 hour long, and produced by a different production company.	Various	Zee TV
1998	Woh	This TV series is based on Stephen King's epic horror novel It.	United Studios Ltd	Zee TV
1998	X Zone	An enthralling series with a new unrelated episode every week dealing in demons, spirits, curses, voodoo puppets, rituals of the dark and all other things that go bump in the night.	Various	Zee TV
2001	Ssshhhh...Koi Hai	Many TV celebrities also featured in the show.	Cinevistaas Limited (Season 1) Contiloe Entertainment (Season 1–3)	Star Plus
2001	Aap Beeti	†	B.R. Films	DD National
2002	Achanak 37 Saal Baad	The centerpiece of this serial was a little known small town Gahota, which experienced paranormal activities after each cycle of 37 years.	Fireworks Productions	Sony
2002	Kya Hadsaa Kya Haqeeqat	†	Balaji Telefilms	Sony
2003	Vikraal Aur Gabraal	A spinoff of the popular horror anthology series Ssshhhh...Koi Hai.	Cinevistaas Limited	Star Plus
2004	Rooh	A series of one hour telefilms. Each story focussed on a different aspect of paranormal activity such as ghosts, zombies, phantoms, possessed objects, witches and wizards and sinister ghosts.	Sphere Origins	Zee TV
2004	Raat Hone Ko Hai	The show is based on supernatural events takes place at night.	Fireworks Productions	Sahara One
2004	Kyaa Kahein	The series is similar to Kya Hadsaa Kya Haqeeqat, which aired on Sony TV.	Balaji Telefilms	Zoom
2005	Jaiksan Jaibarg	Jaiksan (English: Jackson) is a Hindi Language horror series which aired on StarPlus in 2005. Jaiksan is based on Jackson Jaberg by Jordan David.	Sagar Films (Pvt. Ltd.)	StarPlus(later syndicated to Disney Channel India)
2006	Mano Ya Na Mano	The reality show based on real incidents took place in various places in India.	Cinema Vision India	Star One
2009	Black	The series stars known television and film actor Mamik Singh along with Aaliya Shah who investigate and try to solve several mysterious deaths.	Sunil Agnihotri Productions	9X
2010	The Chair	†	†	Bindass
2010	Girls Night Out	The most exciting and horror Reality game show played with Girls alone at an abandoned place. Given them some tasks to do with a live camera monitored by professional paranormal investigation team of Gorav Tivari.	†	MTV India
2011	Kaala Saaya	The series starrs known television and film actor Mamik Singh along with Aaliya Shah who investigate and try to solve several mysterious deaths.	Sunil Agnihotri Productions	Sahara One
2011	Anhoniyon Ka Andhera	The series is produced by Bollywood film producer Vikram Bhatt, and each story of the show revolves around Anahita Malik, a girl who has supernatural powers.	ASA Productions & Enterprises	Colors
2012	Yeh Kaali Kaali Raatein	†	Eagle Films	Sahara One
2012	Haunted Nights	†	The Entertainment Hub	Sahara One
2012	Fear Files	The show is based on real life of events of people who was the victim of supernatural power.	Essel Vision Productions	Zee TV
2013	Khauff Begins... Ringa Ringa Roses	The show is about a young girl, Maitri who believes her father is a superhero, who fights against ghosts.	Somersault Productions	Life OK
2013	Ek Thhi Naayka	Each episode of the series features a new female protagonist who fights against witches, devils and demonic entities, signifying the triumph of good over evil.	Balaji Telefilms	Life OK
2013	Bhoot Aaya	The show was directed by Ayush Raina who also directed Horror Story (a Bollywood 2013 film).	Cinetek Telefilms Pvt. Ltd	Sony
2015	Darr Sabko Lagta Hai	Two seasons of the series have been successfully aired. Bipasha Basu hosted the first season of the series.	Reel Life Entertainment	&TV
2016	Kavach... Kaali Shaktiyon Se	It explores the concept around pisaach, genies and fairies with the female protagonist being a half human- half fairy	Balaji Telefilms	Colors TV
2016	Brahmarakshas	The series is based on fantasy thriller film, Jaani Dushman and the western fairy tale, Beauty and the Beast.	Balaji Telefilms	Zee TV
2017	Cheekh..Ek Khaufnaak Sach	†	Tele-Buddies TSC	BIG Magic
2017	Kuldeepak	†		&TV
2018	Anjaan: Special Crimes Unit	The show is about paranormal investigative crime and horror.		Discovery Jeet
2018	Darr Ke Uss Paar	†	†	Discovery Jeet
2018	Qayamat Ki Raat	The show revolves around a taantrik whose head and an arm were severed and separately hidden by a woman, but he cursed her entire family and vowed to resurrect himself.	Balaji Telefilms	Star Plus
2018	Kaun Hai?	Kaun Hai is a horror show based on that real fear, experienced by real people in real haunted places. Ghosts, evil creatures, malevolent spirits, reincarnations, black magic are featured in the show.	Contiloe Pictures	Colors TV
2018	Nazar	The story is about an evil Daayan, who eats people's age to remain young and beautiful.	4 Lions Films	StarPlus
2018	Daayan	It revolves around a young woman with a sixth sense and ability to see premonitions who keeps dreaming of a witch who abducts children.	Balaji Telefilms	&TV
2018	Laal Ishq	Laal Ishq is a Hindi romantic series of passionate love stories set in different backdrops, each episode showcase an offbeat love story with a supernatural twist.	Jaasvand Entertainments Pvt. Ltd	&TV
2018	Tantra	'Tantra' tells the tale of a family who has fallen prey to the clutches of incantation. The Khanna's are an affluent family who move into their dream home but become unfortunate victims of the gruesome practice of Tantra. The antagonist is the House itself whose eerie effects makes the place unliveable and a nightmare for its inhabitants.	Swastik Productions	Colors TV
2019	Kavach... MahaShivratri	The story of a young unmarried woman who fasts on every Mahashivratri and prays to Lord Shiva for the husband of her dreams, but is unknowingly cursed by an evil entity that haunts her endlessly.	Balaji Telefilms	Colors TV
2019	Divya Drishti	2 sisters, Divya and Drishti are blessed with supernatural powers. Divya can see the future and Drishti can change it.	Fireworks Productions	StarPlus
2019	Yehh Jadu Hai Jinn Ka!	Aman is a nawab who is cursed by the shadow of a Jinn. Roshni is an entertainer with the heart of an angel. Will their love be able to break the curse before it is too late?	4 Lions Films	StarPlus
2021	Jijaji Chhat Parr Koii Hai	While the Jaldirams and Jindals keep fighting over property, ChandraPrabha, who is a lookalike of Connaught Place, continues to haunt the house.	Edit II	Sony SAB
2022	Pishachini		Shakuntalam Telefilms	Colors TV
2025	Noyontara		Peninsula Pictures	Colors TV
2025	Aami Dakini		Shree Venkatesh Films	Sony

== See also ==
- List of Hindi thriller shows
- List of Hindi comedy shows
- List of Bollywood horror films
