= Kahani Chandrakanta Ki =

Indian television series

- Genre: Fantasy
- Based on: Chandrakanta Santati by Devaki Nandan Khatri
- Developed by: Devaki Nandan Khatri
- Written by: Sahil Sultanpuri
- Screenplay by: Sunil Agnihotri; Srikant Viswakarama
- Directed by: Avdhesh yadav
- Creative director: Siddharth Agnihotri
- Starring: See below
- Theme music composer: Aslam Surti
- Opening theme: "Kahani Chandrakanta Ki" by Shaan & Praja Promita
- Country of origin: India
- Original language: Hindi
- No. of seasons: 1

Production
- Executive producer: Vandana Jain
- Producer: Sunil Agnihotri
- Cinematography: SajinRajPillai
- Editors: Suresh Gupta; Neelesh Naidu
- Camera setup: Multi-camera
- Running time: Approx. 24 minutes
- Production company: Sunil Agnihotri Productions

Original release
- Network: Sahara One
- Release: 6 June 2011 – 23 March 2012

Related
- Chandrakanta

Kahani Chandrakanta Ki (transl. Story of princess Chandrakanta) is an Indian fantasy television series based on Devaki Nandan Khatri's second novel Chandrakanta Santati. The series premiered on Sahara One on 6 June 2011, and is produced by known television producer Sunil Agnihotri.

== Plot ==
The story focused on the twists and turns of Princess Chandrakanta's life, as well as on the love life of her eldest son, Yuvraj Inderjeet Singh with their enemy Maharaj Shiv Dutt's daughter Rajkumari Kishori.

== Cast ==
- Shikha Swaroop as Maharani Chandrakanta: The queen of Chunargarh.
- Santosh Shukla as Virendra Singh: The king of Chunargarh who won the Kingdom from his rival Shiv Dutt.
- Rahul Sharma as Yuvraj Inderjit Singh: Princess Chandrakanta and Virendra Singh's eldest son who is captured by Bhavani Singh.
- Saahil Goradia as Yuvraj Anand Singh: Princess Chandrakanta and Virendra Singh's youngest son.
- Sparsh Sharma as Tara Singh: another aiyyar (secret agent and fighter) of Yuvraj Anand Singh who also joins the venture.
- Bhairav Singh: An aiyyar of Yuvraj Anand Singh who goes out with him to capture the beastly animal ('Narbakshi Cheetah') in the jungle who is killing people of the kingdom.
- Vindu Dara Singh as Abhimanyu Singh: An effective soldier of Chunargarh who is always ready to fight for King Virendra Singh.
- Shiva as Paramveer Singh: Main chief-head and a strong warrior of Maharaj Virendra Singh's army.
- Raja Chaudhary as Tej Singh: Another great warrior of Maharaj Virendra Singh who goes in search for lost Yuvraj's along with other warriors.
- Sonia Rakkar as Padmini: A 'women' warrior of Chunargarh who always suggests positive schemes to Maharaj Virendra Singh, and also takes care of Maharani Chandrakanta when she falls sick after the kidnapping of Inderjeet.
- Sheetal Shah as Chapla: Another 'women' warrior of Chunargarh who works along with Padmini and tries to get some information about Shivgarh from Mayajal, an aiyyar of enemy Chandlal.
- Maharaj Jai Singh: Maharani Chandrakanta's father and a king of Vijaygarh. He takes care of his grandsons: Inderjeet and Anand.
  - Maan Singh: A chief advisor of Maharaj Jai Singh in Vijaygarh who becomes the caretaker of Yuvraj Anand Singh after the death of his grandfather.
  - Mahananda: A messenger of Maharaj Jai Singh.
  - Bhairavi: She works with Mahananda deliver messages and also takes care of Maharaj Jai Singh.
- Sangram Singh: A great warrior of Chunargarh who stay in Vijaygarh to take care of both princes.
- Jagan Singh: A soldier in Chunargarh's army who first informs Virendra Singh about the kidnapping of Inderjeet.
- Bhupendra Singh: A messenger in Chunargarh fort.
- Baba Rudra Nath: One of the great Ascetic of Chunargadh. He always seeking good of all member of Chunargarh. Especially of Maharaj and Maharani of Chunargarh.
- Puneet Issar as Maharaj Shiv Dutt: The king of Shivgarh, who is the greatest enemy of Maharani Chandrakanta, and wants to take over Chunargarh.
- Kiran Ahuja as Maharani Kalvati: The queen of Shivgarh.
- Rajkumari Kishori: The only daughter of Maharaj Shiv Dutt and Kalavati, who falls in love with Yuvraj Inderjeet Singh.
- Rajendra Gupta as Pandit Jagannath: The Master of Ramal (a method of predictions using a dice board and dices), Astro-numerology and the pioneer of the powerful 'Kutniti' in his times, Pandit Jagannath is known for his impeccability in predicting the future moves and consequences to his King. An ardent follower of the Maharaja Shivdutt, the King himself relies and obeys essential advice given by Panditji, including steps to capture, destroy and kill enemies.
  - Khuda Baksh: an aiyyar sent by Pandit Jagannath to keep an eye on Chunargarh Fort, who transforms himself into Padmini in order to get some secret information from Paramveer Singh.
  - Abu Bakkar: Another aiyyar of Pandit Jagannath who accompanies Khuda Baksh.
  - Bhanupratap Singh: Maharaj Shiv Dutt's messenger.
- Mamik Singh as Badrinath: A great warrior of Shivgarh who greatly respects his King Shiv Dutt and Pandit Jaganath. He is against the idea of capturing Kunwar Inderjeet Singh for the trade of Chunargarh kingdom. He saves Inderjeet from Bhavani Singh who almost killed him.
- Ejlal Ali Khan Ram: A friend of Jeevan both killed by villagers and Ram's spirit searching for his wife who also killed, Jeevan helped him
  - Mrinalini: She is appointed by Badrinath to take care of Yuvraj Inderjeet Singh in Shivgarh fort, after he is rescued from Bhawani Singh's karagar. She is often threatened and bribed by both Somnath and Bhawani Singh to help them kill Yuvraj Inderjeet Singh.
- Kruttika Desai as Nayantara: One of the shrewdest aiyyara of Shiv Dutt and a loyal of Shivgarh who excels in the skill of magical morphing and teams up with Badrinath on a number of occasions to counter Chunargarh.
- Raja Chaudhary as Bhawani Singh: A disciple of Badrinath, and a strong warrior of Shivgarh who believes Shiv Dutt to be his God. He kidnaps Inderjeet on Maharaj Shiv Dutt's order, and wants to trade Inderjeet in return for Chunargarh kingdom from Maharani Chandrakanta. Chandilal tries his best to get Bhavani Singh with an intention to follow him and continue opposing and creating trouble for Badrinath.
- Anokhi Srivastav as Mridula: An aiyyar who works for Bhawani Singh.
  - Sher Khan: Main caretaker of Bhawani Singh's karagar, who holds Yuvraj Inderjeet Singh hostage at the jail.
  - Pahar Singh: He works for Sher Khan and helps him move Inderjeet to another secret jail of Bhawani Singh.
- Shailendra Singh as Kroor Singh: A member of the Vijaygarh king's court who dreams of marrying Chandrakanta and taking over the throne. Now lives in Shivgarh fort. He calls himself the greatest warrior among all kingdoms' and is always in search to instigate Maharaj Shiv Dutt against Chunargarh. He kidnaps Yuvraj Anand Singh with the help of his aiyyars and wants to present him to Maharaj Shiv Dutt in return for a kingdom of his own.
  - Nazim: An aiyyar of Kroor Singh who always praise Kroor Singh being the most beautiful person, but makes fun of him behind his back. He is known for his comic wits along with Ahmed.
  - Ahmed: Another aiyyar of Kroor Singh who looks like Nazim, and is known for his cunningness. He is killed by Changez Khan, a known killer and follower of Somnath.
  - Kesariya: She is an aiyyar of Kroor Singh who often transforms herself into others to get information for Kroor Singh. She misleads Chunargarh's warrior in the jungles when they are searching for the lost Yuvraj's.
  - Komalika: Kroor Singh's aiyyara who misleads the searching team of Inderjit Singh, and later disguises herself as Sher Khan to get some information from Bhavani Singh, but he finds out and kills her.
  - Mohini: Kroor Singh's wife who hates him for always praising Maharani Chandrakanta.
  - Bheem/Balwan: Kroor Singh's two midget sons.
- Somnath: A great warrior of Maharaj Shiv Dutt. He is Badrinath's brother, who is in charge of taking care of Maharani Kalvati and Rajkumari Kishori in Sambhalpur. He comes to Shivgarh fort on his brother's order. He is in love with Rajkumari Kishori, and wants to marry her so he can be the next king after Maharaj Shiv Dutt.
  - Changez Khan: Somnath's follower who greatly respects him and will kill anyone who disrespects Somnath. He is a known for brutally killing people and taking bath with their blood. He kills Ahmed.
- Roopa Ganguly as Roopmati
- Kriti Sanon as Roopmati/Ardhangini
- Vinod Kapoor as Chandilal: A disciple of Pandit Jagannath who is loyal to Chunargadh and Maharaj Virendra Singh. Even though he is highly regarded by the King, he plays foul and changes loyalty to Maharaj Shivdutt. In order to prevent Chandilal from giving out royal secrets to Maharaj Shiv Dutt and Pandit Jagannath, Chandilal is ordered to be captured by mandate of the Kingdom of Chunargadh.
  - Divya Dwivedi as Mayajaal: She is a follower of Chandlal, who transforms herself as Chandlal and gets herself kidnapped by Chunargarh's warriors in order to help Chandilal escape from Chunargarh. She greatly gets tortured by Padmini and Chapla but does not reveal any information about Chandilal.
  - Jamuna: An aiyyara who works for Chandilal and disguises herself as Kesariya to find information about Yuvraj Inderjeet Singh from Mrinalini who in charge of taking care of Inderjeet in Shivgarh fort.
- Sumana Das as Damini: She is the love-interest of both Badrinath and Abhimanyu Singh. She works to maintain peace between Chunargarh and Shivgarh. She is very close to Rani Roopmati and is searching for her who is lost somewhere in the jungles.
- Kaveri: She is the queen of Kaneri Jungles who confronts and tries to mislead the searching team of Chunargarh's warriors and wants to kill Inderjeet Singh because she believes that Maharaj Virendra Singh killed her husband, but later regrets after Paramveer Singh tells her the truth about her husband's death. She is later shown as dead but her soul comes back and she guides the searching team of lost Yuvraj.
- Revaty: She is a serpent girl who meets Badrinath when he is searching for Damini. She insults Badrinath by saying that he is not above Maharaj Shiv Dutt, and offends him when she refuses to tell him when he asks her what she is doing.
- Chunnilal: Another SLY against of Maharaj Virendra Singh.
- Shilpi Sharma as Kajal: She is with Chunnilal. The extra-marital love interest of Kunwar Virendra Singh. Initially she was involved with Chunnilal to trap Virendra Singh but later she fell in love with him.
- Meghna Patel/Dimpy Mahajan as Jwala: A wishful serpent (vishkanya nagin) whose snake lover is killed by Daku Mangal Singh.
- Jeewan: Wishful serpent (nag), Jwala's Lover.
- Daku Mangal Singh: He killed Jwala's lover. He wants to kill Jwala also and wants to get the gem (nagmani).
- Baba Bhairav Nath: He is a Tantrik and he want to get the GEM also.
