= Gul Sanobar =

- Also known as: An Epic Saga of Love
- Genre: Fantasy
- Created by: Dhirubhai Gohil
- Based on: Arabian Nights
- Written by: Farooq Barelvi
- Directed by: Sunil Agnihotri
- Theme music composer: Rais Bharti
- Opening theme: "Gul Sanobar" by Anwar
- Country of origin: India
- Original languages: Hindi; Urdu
- No. of seasons: 1
- No. of episodes: 52

Production
- Producer: Rupesh D. Gohil
- Editor: Shiva Sharma
- Running time: 22.5 minutes
- Production company: Utopia Productions

Original release
- Network: DD National
- Release: 1999 – 2000

Gul Sanobar is an Indian fantasy adventure television series created by Dhirubhai Gohil which aired on DD National from 1999 to 2000. It is based on the Persian legend of Gul o Sanaubar and the Arabian Nights.

== Cast ==
- Asif Sheikh as Shehzada Tamaas of Hindustan
- Seema Kapoor as Mehrangez
- Parikshit Sahni as Sultan of Hindustan
- Ranjeet as Veer Singh the commander of Hindustan
- Vindu Dara Singh as Turki
- Saeed Jaffery as Sultan of Iran
- Pradeep Rawat
- Vinod Kapoor
- Nimay Bali as Jhigala
- Deep Dhilon as Zargam
- Shiva as Ziyaak
- Arjun (Firoz Khan) as Almaas
- Mamik Singh as Changez
- Sheeba Akashdeep as Zeenat

== Episodes ==
1. The return of Prince Taimas
2. Execution of Kabul Prince
3. Escaped prisoners
4. The arrogant queen
5. Unsolved mystery of Gul Sanobar
6. The torture of queen Mehrangez
7. Search for absconding prisoners
8. Declare of war on Turkistan
9. The beginning of war
10. Capture of Zighala
11. The evil blood
12. The mystery of stone statue
13. Death of Veer Singh

== Home media ==
RDG Productions Pvt. Ltd. re-released the show on its YouTube channel starting from 2018.
