= Sushil Datta =

Indian filmmaker

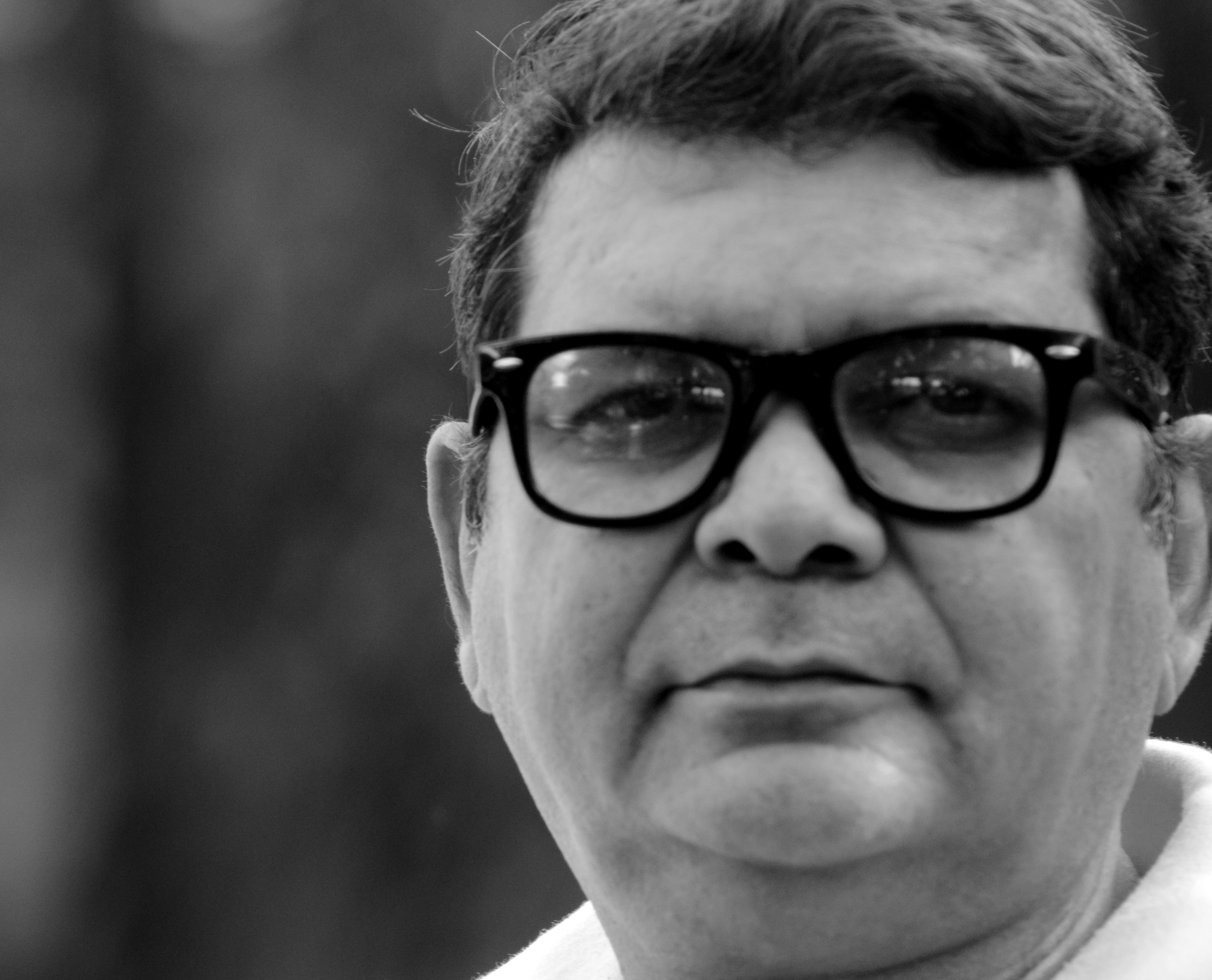
- Born: February 4, 1959 (age 67); Kangra, Himachal Pradesh, India
- Occupations: Filmmaker, Writer

Sushil Datta, also known as Sushil Datta Sharma (born February 4, 1959), is an Indian filmmaker, writer and film and media teacher based in Mumbai. During his career journey he has extensively worked in both film and television mediums. He has also been associated with some of the country's top media companies like UTV, Balaji Telefilms, Nimbus Television & Sports and Sudhir Mishra Productions. He is most noted for the feature film Hazaaron Khwaishein Aisi (2003), where he served as an executive producer. In television, India's first countdown show Superhit Muqabla was also directed by him.

== Early life and education ==
Sushil Datta's childhood was spent at various places in the country owing to his father's transferable job as an officer in the Indian Air Force. During this time he developed an interest in theatre and was actively involved as a director/actor in many such small town productions. It was his amateur production of Revti Sharan Sharma's play Deepshikha at University of Jodhpur which firmly made him realize the path which he was to follow in his life.

He kept alive his interest in arts, literature, theatre, and later cinema while supporting himself for his post graduate studies in journalism. The next logical step was joining the AJK, Mass Communication Research Centre at Jamia Millia Islamia (first Batch 1983–1985). During the master's degree course he came close to stalwarts like late Anwar Jamal Kidwai, after whom the famed AJK Mass Communication Research Centre is named. Also world-renowned documentary filmmaker James Beveridge and Directors Guild Award Winning/Gemini Nominated Director Michael Kennedy were instrumental in shaping his film and Television skills. The other teachers at Jamia Mass Communication Research Centre who influenced him were Documentary film maker Rajiv Mehrotra (currently chairman of Public Service Broadcasting Trust) and renowned wildlife film maker Mike Pandey. While at Jamia Mass Communication Research Centre he was awarded the INLAKS Scholarship for Studies in Media in India.

== Career ==
While still a student of Jamia, he won a project of three documentaries on social issues from Government of Madhya Pradesh. Soon after he was hired by Studio IFEKT to be the chief assistant director to the acclaimed series based on actual police cases, Police File Se.

During his stay at Delhi, post-Jamia days he came in close contact with Safdar Hashmi, N. K. Sharma, Madan Gopal Singh and M. K. Raina. It was M. K. Raina whom he started assisting in television productions. Zameen, starring Manohar Singh and Uttra Baokar was the first, followed by telefilms like Apne Se Door (Seema Biswas' debut), Nirnay and Hosh. His first independent break came through with the film Nai Subeh which he directed for producer Surinder Singh (of the duo Singh Bandhu). The film, which dealt with the problems of terrorism, was widely and critically acclaimed. For the same producer he directed a TV series on devotional music – Gavo Sacchi Baani which featured well-known artists like Asha Bhonsle and poet/philosopher Harbhajan Singh.

He has made serials for Doordarshan – Nai Manzilen Nai Rahein and several documentaries and short video advertisements for various departments and ministries. He has also made films in the celluloid format – Sahar and Swadhikaar for the Department of Child & Women Welfare.

He was also director and segment producer for Indian television's first cultural magazine Surabhi, a series produced by Siddharth Kak for DD National. Before making a move to Mumbai in 1992, he worked with an Italian feature film, Delhi '92 which was directed by Italo Spinelli.

Once in Mumbai he was assigned to direct Nimbus Television's countdown show (dubbed the mother of all countdowns) – Superhit Muqabla. His association with Nimbus lasted many years where he worked as creative director/supervising producer/executive producer for many of their television shows like Nyaay and AGNI. During his tenure at Nimbus he came in close contact with Harish Thawani, Akash Khurana and Sudhir Mishra.

Datta also directed a few episodes of Tony & Diya Singh's popular programmes – Just Mohabbat, one of the most popular youth-based series on Sony TV, and Maan, a family drama with a Punjabi culture backdrop on Channel 9 Gold.

Sudhir Mishra's critically acclaimed and awarded Hazaaron Khwaishein Aisi (2003) came next where Datta took on the mantle of executive producer. In the first six months the film travelled to twelve film festivals e.g. Turkey, Estonia, River to River (Florence), Berlin, Edinburgh, Washington, Goa, Bite The Mango (Bradford), Commonwealth (Manchester), India (Los Angeles), Dallas, and Pacific Rim (California) where it was equally praised by critics and audience both.

In 2004 the husband wife duo of Himalaya & Bhagyashree asked him to take on the dual responsibility of directing and executing the production of their acclaimed TV serial Kagaz Ki Kashtti which ran on Sahara TV for 204 episodes.

Soon after, Datta joined UTV, United Television Software, as head of production. During his tenure there, he supervised the production of many popular shows like Bhabhi (Star Plus), Shararat (Star Plus), Kehta Hai Dil (Star Plus), Shakalaka Boom Boom (Star Plus), Meher (DD National), Cry Telethon (Sony TV), Special Squad (Star One), Business Bytes (BBC), Back To Floor (BBC), Stuntmen of Bollywood (National Geographic Channel) and many more for Hungama TV.

Apart from being an active film maker, Datta is also deeply interested in training and teaching newcomers to the film and television industry. As a result he was appointed by Balaji Telefilms' ICE (Institute of Creative Excellence) as a subject matter expert.

Currently he is working as director of City Pulse Institute of Film and Television (CPIFT) where he has directed two short films – Aakhiri Padaav and Nirmal Bharat Abhiyan. From CPIFT he moved to Asian Academy of Film and Television (Marwah Studios), Noida as Dean, Media Education and Industry Interface and later to GNA University as Dean of Faculty of Film & Television. At GNA University he created and organized the successful three-day-long first Punjab film festival at Jalandhar which was attended by many renowned personalities of Punjabi cinema, music and television.

Currently he serves as the Dean of Faculty of Mass Communication and Media Technology at Shree Guru Gobind Singh Tricentenary University, also known as SGT University, Gurugram. The Mass Communication faculty at SGT University owns production facilities including television studios, shooting floors, PCR, MCR and cameras and audio equipment.

He is a member of Film Writers Association, Mumbai and Western India Cinematographers' Association (W.I.C.A), Mumbai.

He served on the jury of short film The Unassailable (2014) organized by Kadi Sarva Vishwavidyalaya.

== In development ==
- Teen Deviyaan, Hindi feature film for CPIFT Productions.
- Rent Shent Te Aunty Kent, Hindi feature film.
- Biopic documentary on Padma Bhushan awardee Poornima Arvind Pakvasa.
