= Yug (TV series) =

- Directed by: Sunil Agnihotri
- Starring: see below
- Opening theme: "Yug Badla, Badla Hindustan"
- Country of origin: India
- Original language: Hindi
- No. of seasons: 1
- No. of episodes: 610

Production
- Producer: Mona Shourie Kapoor
- Camera setup: Multi-camera

Original release
- Network: DD National
- Release: 11 September 1996 – 13 November 1997

Yug is an Indian Hindi-language television series that was telecast on DD National from September 1996 to November 1997.

Yug was a fictional series depicting the story of Indian freedom fighters and their struggle to win freedom for India. The series was produced and directed by Sunil Agnihotri and had notable actors such as Hema Malini, Ashwini Bhave, Pankaj Dheer, Shahbaz Khan, Mukesh Khanna, Vinod Kapoor, Javed Khan, Sudesh Berry and Abhimanyu Singh.

== Plot ==
Nirmala is the eldest daughter of Rai Bahadur Dina Nath. Mother of Nirmala and Rukmani nourish the dream of putting an end to the tyranny of the foreign rulers of the country. The rulers have adopted clandestine designs of divide and rule, virtually divided the entire society into privileged (favorites of the rulers) and under privileged (poor and ignored). Nirmala's father, Dina Nath, belongs to this elite privileged lot having been groomed thoroughly pro-British. Nirmala decides to devote her prime youth for the struggle to end this injustice to Indians and follows Gandhi's ideology. Her younger sister Rukmani is a revolutionary and is an ardent follower of Netaji Subash Chander Bose's ideas of action to achieve fundamental rights to end slavery. Both the sisters strive secretly for a common goal in different ways.

Rukmani meets Ali Khan who is a revolutionary and in police custody. She rescues him in a well planned daring encounter with police while Ali Khan was being secretly shifted from one jail to another. This feat earned her a great respect and trust to become an important member of the revolutionary party. Ranjit Basu of Bengal is a pivotal force who circumvents the powerful British intelligence and further manipulates the gathered information to the advantage of the revolutionary party. He uses his influences to motivate the common people to join in the struggle to end the rule of tyranny.

On the intellectual side there are two contrasting lawyers;

Darshan Lal who has studied law in England and opted to sacrifice a promising future for the freedom of his motherland. He was deported to Kala Pani (an isolated jail in an island in the Bay of Bengal) and could manage to jump from the ship.

Advocate P.C Das a prominent and charismatic ace lawyer who fights fiercely for the rights of his clients, religion no bound. He is known to be generous and fair and hold an unwavering fervour for his country and countrymen.

Further, The tiger of Punjab, Kartar Singh represented the strong nationalistic emotions of brave Punjabis. All sorts of tortures tried on him in Kala Pani could not deter him from pursuing the ultimate goal of freedom from slavery of India. His determination served as a role model to all the revolutionaries. He meticulously planned the elimination of the obstacles and always considered all the British as his enemy number one. He was ably helped in his missions by his capable dedicated daughter Vidya.

Sarojini Sen a socialite of Bengal who moves in high circles of British Government is a sympathizer of the movement and becomes very handy for small favors from government officials.

A British Superintendent of Police Peter Gomes is a terror. Being Anglo Indian, he considers himself British. He is cruel toward freedom fighters. He is loyal to the British Raj.

Bhima, a notorious dacoit who ruled an area through fear of his gun, accidentally met the revolutionary Veeru who gradually prevailed upon him to channel his might towards the life giving stream – freedom, rather than his present profession of killing the innocent countrymen. He subsequently became a firebrand revolutionary.

The persistent and dedicated efforts of the above few brave heroes along with the participation of thousands of countrymen directly and indirectly could put an end to colonialism.

== Cast ==
- Hema Malini as Nirmala
- Ashwini Bhave as Rukmani
- Pankaj Dheer as Ali Khan
- Shahbaz Khan / Sudesh Berry as Virendra (Veeru) Singh
- Mukesh Khanna as Darshan Lal
- Vindu Dara Singh as Bheema Daaku
- Arjun as Peter Gomes 'The Killer'
- Javed Khan as Advocate P.C. Das
- Vinod Kapoor as Ranjit Basu
- Reena Wadhwa as Ratna / Nirmala's daughter in episode 1
- Dara Singh as Kartar Singh
- Nimai Bali as Hazaari
- Deepraj Rana as Deva
- Aasif Sheikh as Hasrat Nurani
- Sunil Bob Gadhawali as Hamilton
- Brownie Parashar as John Dorno
- Priya Tendulkar as Suhasini Journalist
- Shikha Swaroop as Professor Anjali
- Abhimanyu Singh as Commissioner Sahib
- Neena Gupta as Lady Lawyer
- Mamik Singh as Arjun Singh
- Asrani as Jailor
- Fateh Khan as Anwar Fateh Haan
- Pradeep Rawat as Marshal
- Anil Nagrath as Thakur
- Shehzad Khan as Thakur Vikram Singh
- Tom Alter as Maulana Abul Kalam Azad
- Saurabh Dubey as Muhammad Ali Jinnah
- Prabha Sinha
- Aashish Kaul
- Pramod Kapoor
- Tarun Shukla
- Dinesh Ojha
- Devdutt
- Santosh Gupta
- Anil Tyagi
- Madhu Bharti
- Adi Irani
- R.S.Chopra
- Suresh Chatwal
- Ashok Banthiya
- Krutika Desai as Vidya
- Kiran Juneja as Durga
- Sonu Walia as British Girl
- Seema Kapoor as Krantikar
- Durga Jasraj as Sikh Girl (Krantikari)
- Sudha Chandran as Sakina: Ali Khan's sister
- Kalpana Iyer as Sarojini Sen
- Asha Sharma as Rukmini and Nirmala's mother
- Amita Nangia as Royal Family
- Neelam Mehra as Beg. Nafiza
- Kamia Malhotra as Nazima
- Fatima Sheikh as Gandhian
- Sulabha Deshpande as Mad Revolutionary Villager
- Deepak Parashar as Gandhian Amar Singh
- Deep Dhillon as SP of Cobra
- Mangal Dhillon as Raja Thakur
- AK Hangal as Gandhian Leader
- Ajit Vachani as D.M.
- Amit Behl as Jay Dutt (lawyer of coalmine worker)
- Arun Bali as Dina Nath Rai Bahadur
- Bharat Kapoor as Congress leader
- Brahamchari as Doctor supporter of freedom fighter
- Gajendra Chauhan as District Magistrate
- Girja Shankar as Goverdhan Chaturvedi (Krantikari)
- Mohan Kapur as Tejpal (supporter of Subhash Chandra Bose)
- Dipesh Shah as Bapu-Mahatma Gandhi
- Anand Balraj as Andy Gomes
- Goga Kapoor as Governor
- Paintal as British owner of coal mines
- Prithavi as Viceroy
- Rajeev Verma as Krishna Kant Sahay (Congress leader)
- Raj Kiran as Maulana Nausar Ali (Congress leader)
- Raza Murad as Khalil Rahman (Lawyers of Netaji)
- Sudhir Mittoo as Commander Burton
- Sudhir Dalvi as Masterjee (Gandhian)
- Vijayendra Ghatge as Raja Rajendra Singh
- Nathan Amondson as Major Roberts
