= Nyaay =

Television series

- Written by: Pawan K. Sethhi
- Directed by: Sudhir Mishra
- Country of origin: India
- No. of seasons: 1
- No. of episodes: 470

Production
- Producers: Harish Thawani Nimbus Communications; Sushil Datta

Original release
- Network: DD Metro
- Release: 1999 – 2001

Nyaay (also spelled Nyay, meaning Justice) was a daily TV series directed by Sudhir Mishra, written by Pawan K Sethhi, produced by Harish Thawani of Nimbus Corporation and broadcast and Executive Producer Sushil Datta on Doordarshan's Metro network from 1999–2001. It ran for 470 episodes on the DD Network.

== Plot ==
It is a social drama, revolving around three friends, their marriage, their career and their families. Varsha is the main protagonist, with her husband Tarun.

The show saw many cast changes in the latter half, with a lot of lead artists being replaced. The song title of the show is "Dhadkano mein hasraton ka ek sailaab hai. Meri bhi pehchaan ho, bas yahi ek khwaab hai". "Zindagi pal bhar thhehar, dekh mujhe ek nazar. Mera jeevan mera kar, bas itna nyay kar..."

== Cast ==
- Harsh Chhaya as Tarun
- Mona Ambegaonkar as Varsha (1999-2000)
- Divya Jagdale as Varsha (2000-2001)
- Barkha Madan
- Dinesh Thakur
- Ram Kapoor as Gaurav Makija (1999)
- Aamir Dalvi as Alan
- Kartika Rane as Nandita (Varsha's sister)
- Sandeep Kulkarni
