= Jai Veer Hanuman =

Indian television series

- Genre: Indian History
- Directed by: C. S. Rao
- Starring: See below
- Theme music composer: Ravindra Jain
- Country of origin: India
- Original language: Hindi
- No. of seasons: 1
- No. of episodes: 40

Production
- Producer: G. A. Sheshagiri Rao
- Camera setup: Multi-camera
- Running time: 40–50 minutes

Original release
- Network: Sony
- Release: 1995 – 1996

Jai Veer Hanuman (transl. Glory to Brave lord Hanuman) was an Indian series, that aired on Sony TV in 1995. It was among the first TV series to be telecast on Sony. It was produced by Padmalya Telefilms Limited. It starred Arun Govil as Ram and Vindu Singh as Hanuman.

== Premise ==
The story depicts the journey of Lord Hanuman from his birth to helping Luv and Kush.

== Cast ==
- Arun Govil as Ram
- Vindu Singh as Hanuman
- Udaya Bhanu as Sita
- Bhavani Shankar as Lakshman
- Dara Singh as Kesari
- Goga Kapoor as Ravana
