= Black (Indian TV series) =

Indian television series

- Also known as: Kaala Saaya
- Genre: Horror
- Screenplay by: Tanya Pathak; Sanjeev Soni (dialogues)
- Directed by: Sunil Agnihotri (Avdhesh Yadav)
- Creative director: Avdhesh Yadav
- Starring: See below
- Music by: Aslam Surti
- Country of origin: India
- Original language: Hindi
- No. of seasons: 1
- No. of episodes: 115

Production
- Producer: Sunil Agnihotri
- Production locations: Diu; Shimla; Mahabaleshwar
- Camera setup: Multi-camera
- Running time: Approx. 24 minutes

Original release
- Network: 9X
- Release: 2 March 2009

Black is a Hindi language Indian television series that aired on 9X. The series stars Mamik Singh and Aaliya Shah who investigate and try to solve several mysterious deaths. The series was premiered on 2 March 2009 and is produced by Sunil Agnihotri.

In 2011, a reprisal series titled Kaala Saaya aired on Sahara One between 24 January to 1 July 2011.

== Cast ==
- Mamik Singh as Officer Ranvir Singh
- Natasha Sinha as Sudha Malhotra
- Vinod Kapoor as Ravi Malhotra
- Shiva Rindani as Father D'Cunha
- Aaliya Shah as Aaliya
- Anwar Fatehan as Professor Bishnoi / Baba
- Yash Belani as Rahul Malhotra
- Kruttika Desai as Rubi Gujral
- Vindu Dara Singh as Rajeev Saxena
- Reema Debnath as Church Nun

== See also ==
- List of Hindi horror shows
