= Laat Saab =

1992 classic thriller Bollywood film by Sunil Agnihotri

- Directed by: Sunil Agnihotri
- Produced by: Sunil Agnihotri
- Starring: Jackie Shroff; Neelam
- Music by: Anu Malik
- Release date: 12 June 1992
- Country: India
- Language: Hindi

Laat Saab is a 1992 Bollywood film produced and directed by Sunil Agnihotri. It stars Jackie Shroff, Neelam in the lead roles. This film was inspired by Raj Khosla's classic thriller Woh Kaun Thi?. This is the last known film of veteran actor K. N. Singh who shares his original name in the film. Another actor A. K. Hangal had negative shades in his character of a crook. The Spirit of Anju (Neelam) disappearing with Vijay's (Jackie Shroff) coat was based on a story which took place in the 60s in Bombay, known as Sandra from Bandra.

== Plot ==
Born on the 17th of September in Uttar Pradesh, Vijay Rai leads a wealthy lifestyle along with his dad, Ajay Kumar, who are now settled in scenic Simla. Since Vijay is 25 years old, his dad wants him to get married, but Vijay wants to find his own soul mate. He does find her in Bombay-based Anju, both meet and fall in love with each other. When Anju is informed that her dad is ill, she returns home, and leaves a note for Vijay to contact her there. Upon receiving her note, Vijay departs for Bombay and reaches Anju's residence. He is received by her dad, Dinanath, who informs him that Anju has been dead for over 3 years now. A disbelieving Vijay, assisted by CBI Inspector Jayant Mathur, decides to trace Anju. He and Jayant do find her, but she claims that she has never met Vijay and identifies herself as Mona, a Goa-based dancer/singer. Vijay must now accept Anju's death and move on little knowing that if he persists he will soon be declared insane as none of the people he has come across thus far are who they claim to be

== Cast ==
- Jackie Shroff as Vijay Rai
- Neelam as Anju / Mona
- Mohsin Khan as Amar
- Saeed Jaffrey as Rai Sahib Ajay Rai
- K. N. Singh as K. N. Singh
- Sushma Seth as Sarita Rai
- Asrani as Pyarelal "Pappu"
- Ishrat Ali as CBI Inspector N. A. Ansari / Mastan Baba
- A. K. Hangal as Dinanath / D'Mello

== Music ==
Gulshan Bawra wrote the songs.

| Song | Singer |
|---|---|
| "Hirni Jaisi Ankhon Wali" | Kumar Sanu |
| "De Do De Do Mujhe" | Kumar Sanu, Alka Yagnik |
| "Churaya Tune Dil" | Udit Narayan, Alka Yagnik |
| "Ek Tuhi Mera Sahara" | Alka Yagnik |
| "Battiyan Bujhengi" | Asha Bhosle |
