= Hello Darling (play) =

Play by Mir Muneer

Hello Darling is a 2017 comedy drama play. The play is produced and directed by Yogesh Sanghvi and written by Mir Muneer.

== Plot ==
A husband and wife must have trust in one another and should not be unfaithful to each other. This is the message given to the audience through this drama in a comic way.

== Starring ==
- Sheeba
- Shaad Randhawa
- Payal Goga Kapoor
- Sonia Birje
- Vindu Dara Singh
