= Zor Ka Jhatka: Total Wipeout =

Indian game show

- Also known as: Total Wipeout
- Genre: Reality
- Created by: Endemol
- Presented by: Shah Rukh Khan; Saumya Tandon
- Starring: Karishma Tanna; Dimpy Ganguli; Akashdeep Saigal; Mohit Sehgal; Debina Bonnerjee; Kushal Punjabi; Karan Wahi; Divyanka Tripathi
- Country of origin: India
- Original languages: Hindi; English
- No. of seasons: 1
- No. of episodes: 15

Production
- Production location: Buenos Aires

Original release
- Network: Imagine TV
- Release: 1 February – 25 February 2011

Zor Ka Jhatka: Total Wipeout is an Indian reality game show. Aired on Imagine TV, it was the Indian version of the American reality show Wipeout on ABC. It was hosted by Bollywood star Shah Rukh Khan and co-hosted by Saumya Tandon. The show consisted of a series of obstacles which the contestants must clear to move on to the next round. If a contestant fails to complete an obstacle, he is said to be wiped out. It was organized at the Wipeout course in Buenos Aires, while the end-game bits were shot with Khan at the Yash Raj Studios in Mumbai. The show started airing on 1 February 2011 at 9:00 pm and ended on 25 February 2011 with Kushal Punjabi as the winner taking home Rs. 5,000,000, while German-Polish model Claudia Ciesla was the runners-up by 51 seconds.

== Show format ==
The show is based on a series of challenges in large pools of water or mud to win ₹ 5 million. The episode winner gets Rs. 10 lacs and direct entry in the Grand Finale, the cost decreases after every two episodes. The winner was Kushal Punjabi, who defeated Claudia in the final by 51 seconds and walked away with a prize money of Rs. 5 million.

== Contestants ==
- Capt Albert Louis
- Akashdeep Saigal
- Amit Sarin
- Amit Sareen
- Ashima Bhalla
- Bakhtiyaar Irani
- Claudia Ciesla
- Debina Bonnerjee
- Dimpy Ganguly
- Gaurav Chopra
- Gracious D’Costa
- Hanif Hilal
- Jennifer Winget
- Karan Wahi
- Karishma Tanna
- Krushnaa Patil
- Kushal Punjabi
- Manas Katyal
- Mohit Sehgal
- Manoj Kumar
- Mink Brar
- Narayani Shastri
- Natasha Suri
- Ravi Dixit
- Jai Bhagwan
- Payal Rohatgi
- Priyadarshini Singh
- Raja Chaudhary
- Simran Kaur Mundi
- Sonika Kaliraman
- Annie Gill
- Vindu Dara Singh
- Vrajesh Hirjee
- Priyanka Shah
- Dharamveer Singh
- Johanan Newnes

=== Finalists ===
1. Capt Albert Louis
2. Dharamveer Singh
3. Raja Chaudhary
4. Ravi Dixit
5. Jai Bhagwan
6. Manoj Kumar
7. Bakhtiyaar Irani
8. Claudia Ciesla
9. Amit Sareen
10. Krushnaa Patil
11. Kushal Punjabi
12. Simran Kaur Mundi
13. Annie Gill
14. Hanif Hilal
15. Vindu Dara Singh

=== Grand Finalists ===
- Capt Albert Louis
- Jai Bhagwan
- Claudia Ciesla
- Kushal Punjabi

=== Winner ===
- Kushal Punjabi

== Guests ==
- Priyanka Chopra
- Abhishek Bachchan
- Tusshar Kapoor
- Shreyas Talpade
- Kangana Ranaut
- Riteish Deshmukh
- Rani Mukerji

== First episode ==
A total of 14 contestants participated in the first episode. They faced a series of challenges. Manoj Kumar won the episode completing Wipeout Zone challenge in 5 minutes and 27 seconds. Manoj Kumar won Rs. 10 lakh and got a direct entry in the grand finale episode. Capt Albert Louis, former Army Commando won the 15th Episode and won 3 Lakh and got the final ticket to Grand Finale. So did Claudia Ciesla and Kushal Punjabi. The rest of the contestants were Wiped Out.
