= Hello Darlin' =

Hello Darlin' may refer to:

- Hello Darlin' (album), an album by Conway Twitty

- "Hello Darlin' (song)", a single from this album

- Hello Darlin' (book), a 2001 autobiography by Larry Hagman
- Hello Darlin’ (film), a 2020 British crime drama film starring Doug Allen, Nimmi Harasgama, Sian Reeves, Martyn Luke and Bill Hutchens

== See also ==
- Hello Darling
