= Deepak Parashar =

Indian actor and former model (born 1952)

- Born: 2 April 1952 (age 74); Pune, Bombay State, India
- Occupation: Actor
- Height: 6 ft 2 in (1.88 m)
- Spouse: Sarita Parashar (m. 1985; div. 1987)
- Relatives: Mohan Kumar (uncle)

Deepak Parashar (born 2 April 1952) is an Indian actor and former model. His best known films include Insaaf Ka Tarazu (1980), Nikaah (1982) and Sharaabi (1984). He was a contestant on Bigg Boss in 2006.

== Early life and education ==
He was born in Pune, India on 2 April 1952 to Shobha and Vishvanath Parashar. Belonging to a Punjabi Hindu family, he grew up in Delhi and graduated from Delhi University. Film director Mohan Kumar was his maternal uncle.

== Career ==
=== Mr. India ===
During his college days, he would become Mr. Delhi, later competing for Mr. India. In 1976, he was crowned very first Mr India/India Prince (A Personality Contest) along with Nafisa Ali as Miss India and Poonam Dhillon as Miss Delhi. His claim to fame was "ONLY VIMAL" suitings in the late 1970s, New Delhi donned his photograph.

=== Actor ===
==== Films ====
In the early 1980s, Parashar took several Hindi cinema roles, including Sharaabi, Insaaf Ka Tarazu, Nikaah, Purani Haveli and Aap to Aise Na They. Till date Nikaah remains his best performing movie and Insaaf ka Tarazu one of the best supporting roles he played.

==== Television series ====
Deepak Parashar appeared in the soap opera Kahiin To Hoga, and donned the "royal robes" of a Mughal badshah in the costume drama Chandramukhi. He also appeared in Doordarshan TV serial Swabhimaan as Mahendra Malhotra.

=== Bigg Boss ===
In 2006, he appeared in reality TV show Bigg Boss, until he was evicted in the second week.

== Personal life ==
Parashar married Sarita in 1985 and had a daughter. Sarita left him in 1987, when their daughter was only five months old.

In 2024, Parashar revealed he was romantically linked with actress Zeenat Aman, his co-star in Insaaf Ka Tarazu, in late 1970s, while she was preparing to divorce her husband Sanjay Khan. The relationship was brief and ended with Aman and Parashar marrying different people.

== Filmography ==
=== TV serials ===
- Neem Neem Shahad Shahad (2011) as Chiman Bhai
- Chandramukhi (2007) as Raja Mahendra Pratap Singh
- Bigg Boss 1 (2006) as Participant
- Kahiin to Hoga (2003) as Chetan Garewal
- Dollar Bahu (2001) as Father in Law
- Rishtey – Kashish (2000)
- Hello Friends (1999)
- Kabhi Kabhi (1997) as Nirmal Joshi
- Saturday Suspense (1997)
- Tamanna (1997)
- Kanoon (1995) as Deepak Dasgupta
- Swabhimaan (1995) as Mahendra Malhotra
- Deewarein (1995)
- Tujh Pe Dil Qurban (1995)
- Chandrakanta (1994)
- Raat Ki Pukar (1994)
- Zee Horror Show – Aafat (1994)
- Aandhiyan (1993)

=== Web series ===
- Raisinghani VS Raisinghani (2024)

=== Films ===
- Jaise Karni Vaisi Bharni (2007)
- Yeh Lamhe Judaai Ke (2004) as Shekhar
- Champion (2000) as Nawab Mansoor Ali Khan
- Hai kaun Woh (1999)
- Barood (1998)
- Hatya Kaand (1998)
- Aaj Ka Maseeha (1995)
- Aaja Re O Sajana (1994)
- Pathbhrashtha (1994)
- Insaan Bana Shaitan (1992)
- Ajooba Kudrat Ka (1991)
- Aakhiri Cheekh (1991) as Samuel David
- Hatyarin (1991) as Inspector Ravi
- Shaitani Ilaaka (1990) as Deepak
- Daata (1989) as Inspector Rao
- Mirza Ki Shaadi (1989)
- Khooni Murdaa (1989) as Inspector Rakesh Chopra
- Purani Haveli (1989) as Sunil
- Padosi Ki Biwi (1988)
- Awam (1987) as Surender Jagrathan
- Pyar Kiya Hai Pyar Karenge (1986)
- Babu (1985) as Prem
- Mehak (1985) as Deepak Parashar
- Tawaif (1985) as Sulaiman
- Meetha Jehar (1985)
- Maan Maryada (1984) as Inspector Ajay Kumar
- Sharaabi (1984) as Inspector Anwar
- Maqsad (1984) as Groom
- Kaun? Kaisey? (1983) as Rakesh Rai
- Muqaddar Ki Baat (1983)
- Nikaah (1982) as Wasim Ahmed
- Waqt Ke Shehzade (1982) as Shankar
- Apna Bana Lo (1982) as Deepak
- Patthar Ki Lakeer (1982)
- Armaan (1981)
- Shradhanjali (1981) as Amit Kumar
- Sannata (1981) as Vinod
- Pyar Ki Manzil (1981)
- Aap To Aise Na The (1980) as Vikram Chawla
- Insaaf Ka Tarazu (1980) as Ashok Sharma

=== Producer ===
- Achha Bura (1983) as Producer

=== Assistant director ===
- Bhumika – The Role (1977) as Location Assistant
- Nishant (1975) as Assistant Director
- Ankur (1974) as (Assistant Director & location in-charge)
