= Kruttika Desai =

Indian actress

- Occupation: Actress
- Years active: 1985–present
- Notable work: Uttaran; Mere Angne Mein; Pandya Store; Chandrakanta
- Spouse: Imtiaz Khan
- Children: Ayesha Khan
- Relatives: Amjad Khan (brother-in-law )

Kruttika Desai is an Indian film, theatre and television actress. In the 90s, she gained initial fame in the serial Buniyaad and later for her 4 roles including of a Vishkanya in popular fantasy series Chandrakanta, and later in the next 2 decades, she went on to earn huge recognition for portraying a wide range of characters in television soap operas like Airhostess, Kismet, Dewaar, Noorjahan, Junoon, Lipstick, Tumhari Disha, Mere Anganay mein. She also hosted many shows like Mansi, Superhit Muqabla, and Superhit Hangama. She is the first television actress to go bald for a show, Uttaran. She is widely known for her role in Pandya Store.

== Acting career ==
Desai started her career with theatre, Modelling (Surf, White line, Reliance) and moved onto television in its earliest stages with Airhostess, Ek Kahani, and Ramesh Sippy spotted her and cast her as Mangala in Buniyad. Later she was involved in "Akansha", a theatre workshop for street children and directed their musical extravaganzas. She has also acted in some Gujarati plays and monologues. She has done over 40 serials and later in her career went on to shave her head for the serial Uttaran, making her the first woman to go bald in the history of Indian Television. Desai played many popular roles in Indian soap operas, most notably Noorjehan, A mouthful of sky, (only English serial made in India), Kussum, Chandrakanta, Betal, Black, Junoon, Ram Milaayi Jodi, Uttaran. She also did India's first count down show, Superhit Muqabala where she covered the Michael Jackson show in Bangkok, and many chat shows like Mansi and game shows like Surf Dhamaka. In 2015, she played the pivotal role of Shanti Devi in the Star Plus serial Mere Angne Mein which became one of the most successful and long-running shows. The show ended in August 2017 after a successful run of 2 years. She has done some international films like Turn left for this world, Au bout du Monde and Bengali films and a few Hindi films like Section 375, Blurr, Kiya, Sarpanch Lajoji.

== Personal life ==
Desai was married to Imtiaz Khan, an avant-garde film and serial director and actor. Imtiaz died on 15 March 2020. The couple have a daughter named Ayesha Khan who is a model and actor. Their nephews Seemaab Khan and Shadaab Khan are actors in the industry. Desai is a vegetarian.

== Filmography ==
=== Films ===
Year	Film	Role	Notes
1987	Insaaf	Geeta Kapoor	
1996	Dastak		
2001	Dattak	Roma	
2004	Turn Left at the End of the World	Rachel Talkar	Israeli film
2019	Section 375	Justice Indrani	
2022	Blurr	Radha Solanki	
2023	Meri Lajjo Sarpanch	Lajjo	

=== Television ===
Year	Title	Role	Notes
1986-1987	Buniyaad	Mangla	
1986	Air Hostess		
1993-1994	Dekh Bhai Dekh		
1993-1994	Superhit Muqabla		
1994-1996	Chandrakanta	Sabhya/Ramya/Amba/Vishkanya/Jwala	
1995	Zameen Aasmaan		
1995	A Mouthful of Sky	Anita	
1996-1997	Kismet		
1997-1998	Betaal Pachisi	Naina Jogan	
	Hungama		
2000-2001	Noorjahan	Maharani Maan Bai	
2004-2006	Tumhari Disha	Gargi Sehgal	
	Mansi		
2007-2008	Woh Rehne Waali Mehlon Ki	Kamya Abhay Parashar	
2007-2008	Annu Ki Ho Gayee Waah Bhai Waah		
2007–2009	Chandramukhi	Durgeshwari	
2008	Ssshhhh...Phir Koi Hai	Mansi Veerpratap Singh	Episode 76/77
2008	Ssshhhh...Phir Koi Hai	Madhavi	Episode 94/95
2009	Black	Rubi Gujral	
2010	Do Saheliyaan	Anadi's mother	
2010-2012	Ram Milaayi Jodi	Bharti Gandhi	
2011	Kaala Saaya	Rubi Gujral	
2013-2015	Uttaran	Ekadashi Chatterjee	
2015-2017	Mere Angne Mein	Shanti Devi	
2017	Paramavatar Shri Krishna	Chandalni	
2017-2019	Jiji Maa	Haryali Rawat	
2018	Shakti - Astitva Ke Ehsaas Ki	Preeto's mother	
2018	Silsila Badalte Rishton Ka	Parvati	Cameo
2019	Laal Ishq	Kesar Dadi	Episode 114
2021–2024	Pandya Store	Suman Pandya	
2022	Ravivaar With Star Parivaar	Suman Pandya	Episode 6/7/9/11/16
2025	Meri Bhavya Life	Damayanti Thakur	

=== Web series ===
Year	Title	Role
2020	Bebaakee	Rashida Abdullah
