= Koi Kisise Kum Nahin =

1997 film

- Directed by: Raj N. Sippy
- Written by: Anand Vardhan (dialogues)
- Story by: Anil Kalelkar
- Produced by: Romu N. Sippy
- Starring: Milind Gunaji; Shalini Kapoor; Ravi Kishan; Rohit Roy; Kashmera Shah; Mamik Singh; Ashok Saraf; Ashish Vidyarthi
- Cinematography: Akram Khan
- Edited by: Prashanth Khedekar; Vinod Nayak
- Music by: Anand Raj Anand
- Production company: Film Enterprises
- Release date: 21 November 1997
- Running time: 144 minutes
- Country: India
- Language: Hindi

Koi Kisise Kum Nahin (transl. No one is lesser than anyone) is a 1997 Hindi-language action film directed by Raj N. Sippy and produced by Romu N. Sippy. The film starred Shalini Kapoor, Ravi Kishan, Rohit Roy, and Ashish Vidyarthi.

== Plot ==
This is the story of two honest police officers, trying to arrest Rana and Vicky, drug mafias of the city.

== Cast ==
- Ashish Vidyarthi as Ashok
- Milind Gunaji as Ajay
- Shalini Kapoor as Mansi
- Ravi Kishan as Vicky
- Mamik Singh as Avinash
- Rohit Roy as Anand
- Kashmera Shah as Rekha
- Pratibha Sinha as Poonam
- Ashok Saraf as Peter

== Music ==
Koi Kisise Kum Nahin

Soundtrack album by Anand Raaj Anand
- Released: September 1997
- Genre: Feature film soundtrack
- Label: Saregama

The film music was composed by Anand Raaj Anand.

1. "Aao Bata Hoon" - Vinod Rathod, Anand Raaj Anand
2. "Gham KO Dilse" - Kavita Krishnamurthy, Vinod Rathod, Anand Raaj Anand, Preeti Sagar
3. "Humko Hone De Sharabi" - Abhijeet, Kumar Sanu
4. "Jaane Kyun Na Tu" - Abhijeet, Kavita Krishnamurthy (Not in the film)
5. "Hum Tum MIlke" - Udit Narayan, Kavita Krishnamurthy
6. "Sanwali Haseena" - Kumar Sanu, Kavita Krishnamurthy
