= Laajawab Talent Show =

TV dance talent show in India

- Genre: talent show
- Directed by: Mehmood Nazir
- Presented by: Shad Khan, Mallika Malhotra, Simran Dhol
- Opening theme: Bappa Lahiri
- Country of origin: India
- Original language: Hindi

Production
- Producer: Mehmood Nazir
- Running time: Approx. 30 minutes
- Production company: Star Gazer Advertising

Original release
- Network: DD Metro
- Release: 2002 – 2003

Laajawab Talent Show is a TV dance talent show for youth, based on Hindi film songs, that was broadcast on the Indian TV channel DD Metro in 2002–2003. It was produced and directed by Mehmood Nazir. and the title track was by Bappi Lahiri.

The series is hosted by Shad Khan, Mallika Malhotra and Simran Dhol.

This show has decorated Sunil Jhalani as the best National Talent Coordinator.
