= Aakramana =

- Directed by: Prashanth Kumar N.
- Screenplay by: Prashanth Kumar N.
- Story by: Prashanth Kumar N.
- Produced by: Vimal Jain; Suresh Jain; Prashanth Kumar N. Paramesh
- Starring: Raghu Mukherjee; Daisy Shah; Shilpi Sharma
- Cinematography: K G Ratheesh
- Edited by: Bala Jeevan
- Music by: Sathish Babu
- Production company: A1 Cinemas
- Release date: 11 July 2014
- Country: India
- Language: Kannada

Aakramana is a 2014 Kannada horror film. This movie is an experimental film made both in 2D and 3D format and it is the first 3D horror movie in Kannada.

== Cast ==
- Raghu Mukherjee as Subhash
- Daisy Shah as Nireeksha
- Shilpi Sharma as Kaveri
- Makarand Deshpande
- Avinash
- K. P. Sridhar
- R. N. Sudarshan
- Kishori Ballal
- Danny Kuttapa
- Marco
- Ramesh Pandit
- Prakash Shenoy

== Soundtrack ==
Title	Singers
"Manase Manasa"	Kunal Ganjawala
"Vinimaya" (Female)	Priyanka Jois
"Bul Bul"	Satish Aryan
"Vinimaya" (Male)	Rajesh Krishnan
"Aakramana"	Satish Aryan
