= Chandramukhi (TV series) =

Indian television series

- Based on: Gul-e-Bakawali
- Directed by: Sunil Agnihotri
- Creative director: Avdhesh Yadav
- Country of origin: India
- Original language: Hindi
- No. of seasons: 1
- No. of episodes: 91

Production
- Camera setup: Multi-camera
- Running time: 40 minutes
- Production company: Applause Entertainment

Original release
- Network: DD National
- Release: 30 October 2007

Chandramukhi is an Indian fantasy television series that premiered on 30 October 2007 on DD National. It stars Piku Sharma in the title role. It also stars Mamik Singh, Sachin Khurana, Natasha Sinha, Vinod Kapoor, Kruttika Desai, Vindu Dara Singh, Shiva Rindani and Anwar Fatehan. It is loosely based on the folk-tale of Gul-e-Bakawali.

== Plot ==
This serial story revolves around the tale of Rajkumar Vanraj Singh who turns into an animal (Werewolf) on Amavasya (moonless night) and kills his own people. There's also a curse upon him, whereby his father turned blind after their eye-contact between the two. The only way for Vanraj to restore his father's vision is by getting a particular flower from Princess Chandramukhi's (Piku Sharma) Kingdom - a place where no one comes back alive.

== Cast ==
- Mamik Singh as Rajkumar Suryapratap Singh
- Saadhika Randhawa as Chandramukhi
- Piku Sharma as Chandramukhi / Kalavati
- Sachin Khurana as Rajkumar Vanraj Singh
- Raja Chaudhary as Ranveer Singh
- Mahendra Ghule as Rajveer Singh
- Manish Sharma as Nagaraj
- Natasha Sinha as Rani Padmavati Mahendrapratap Singh
- Vinod Kapoor
- Kruttika Desai as Durgeshwari, a dacoit
- Vindu Dara Singh as Rajkumar Bhanupratap Singh
- Vikramjeet Virk as Vikram Singh
- Anwar Fatehan
- Shiva Rindani
- Dinesh Hingoo
