= Sachin Khurana =

Indian model turned actor

- Occupation: Actor
- Years active: 2002–present

Sachin Khurana is an Indian actor, model and beauty pageant titleholder. He won the title of Grasim Mr. India 1996 and represented India at the 1998 Mister World pageant at Portugal. He also represented India in Best Model of the World contest in 1996. As a model he has ramp presence in over 500 fashion shows in India and abroad. He also appeared in more than 200 advertisements.

== Filmography ==
=== Films ===
Year	Movie	Role
2005	Pyaar Mein Twist	
2008	Dasvidaniya	Varun
2012	Unforgettable	Sameer
2013	Ankur Arora Murder Case	Ajay
2022	X or Y	
2023	Gumraah	Arjun and Sooraj father

=== Television ===
Year	Show	Channel	Role
2002	Avinash IPS	Star Plus	Avinash
2004	Remix	Star One	Shyam Ram
2005	Saat Phere - Saloni Ka Safar	Zee TV	Dhananjay
2007	Tujko Hai Salaam Zindgi	Sony Entertainment Television	Officer Khanna
2007	Chandramukhi	DD National	Vanraj
2009	Aapki Antara	Zee TV	Vikram
2013	Haunted Nights	The Entertainment Hub	Inspector Ravi
2014	SuperCops vs Supervillains	Life OK	Super Villain
2014	Savdhaan India	Life OK	Doctor
2014	Ishq Kills	Star Plus	
2015	Aahat	Sony Entertainment Television	
2017–2019	Yeh Un Dinon Ki Baat Hai	Sony Entertainment Television	Anand Agarwal
2019	Dil Yeh Ziddi Hai	Zee TV	Anand Sharma
2024–present	Suhagan Chudail	Colors TV	Omesh

=== Web series ===
Year	Show	Streaming platform	Role
2020	Hostages	Hotstar	SP Dutt
2024	Heeramandi	Netflix	Zakir Khan
