= Meghna Patel =

Indian film actor and producer

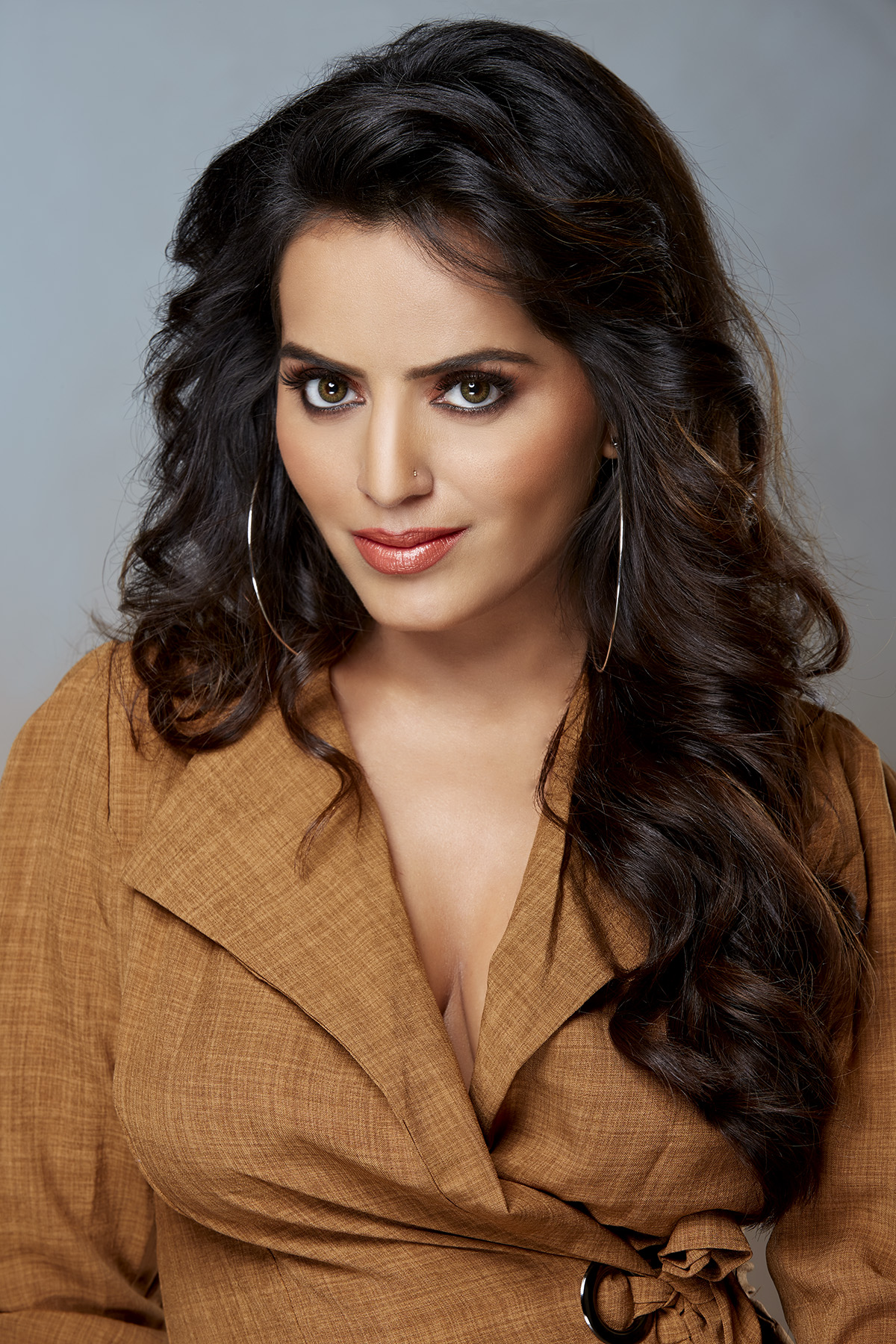
- Patel during a photoshoot
- Born: 26 June; Vadodara, Gujarat, India
- Education: Maharaja Sayajirao University of Baroda
- Occupations: Actress; singer; film producer; model
- Years active: 2006–present

Meghna Patel is an Indian Actor, model, singer, writer, and film producer who works in Hindi films and TV series. She has received awards for her regional films, including the Aap Ki Awaz Award, Nehru Award, Aiwaa Award, Gauravvanta Gujarati Award, Global Cinema Award, and the Roshan Sitare Bollywood Award.

Meghna Patel made her debut the Hindi film Welcome in 2007. She has worked on several Bhojpuri films such as Raja Thakur in 2007, Hamaar Gaon Hamaar Desh (2009), Ghar Aaja Pardeshi (2010), and Hindi films Aishwarya and Faraar and South Indian film Solar Swapnam. She made TV serial Kahani Chandrakanta Ki for channel Sahara One.

== Early life ==
Patel was born on 26 June in the Nadiad town of Gujarat. She attended the Vidhya Vikas school and M.S. University Vadodara and studied to be a graduate in commerce (B.COM). She has said she started to dance at age three. She also used to run Kalamegh Dance Academy for kids in Vadodara before coming to Mumbai.

== Career ==
Patel made her debut in Hindi film in 2007 Welcome and her first Bhojpuri film Raja Thakur. She made and sang in the music video 'Golden Babe' in 2008. Other Bhojpuri films followed, such as Hamaar Gaon Hamar Desh in 2009 and Ghar Aaja pardeshi in 2010.

Her first Hindi film was as a lead actress Aishwarya in 2009, then in Faraar in 2011. She had a supporting role in the Hindi film Hello Darling with Javed Jaffrey. released on 27 August 2010 by Mukta Arts Films. She also made Dekho Yeh hai Mumbai real life in 2012 and Don Ka Filmy Andaz in 2013 (in post-production).

Patel played the lead role, Nagin Jwala, in TV serial Kahani Chandrakanta Ki in 2011/12 for Sahara one TV channel. In 2014, she made the Malayalam movie Solar Swapnam. In 2019, she made the Hindi web series Andheri west film city and Perfect Stranger in 2020.

She made the music video Baby Angel in 2020 and Rab Tu music video in 2021 on B4U Music.

Patel has performed as a dancer in more than 1000 shows in India and abroad.

== Political career ==
Patel supported BJP's Prime Minister candidate Narendra Modi during the Loksabha election 2014. She was featured semi-nude in "American Beauty-style adverts" with Bhartiya Janta Party's lotus flower symbol and the phrase, "vote for Narendra Modi" which was disavowed by Modi and condemned by BJP leaders.

In 2016, Patel joined the Nationalist Congress Party (NCP).

== Filmography ==
| Year | Film | Role | Language | Notes |
|---|---|---|---|---|
| 2007 | Welcome | Cameo | Hindi | played a cameo as Paresh Rawal's assistant |
| 2007 | Raja Thakur | Pinky | Bhojpuri | Lead appearance with Manoj Tiwari, Shatrughan Sinha, Nagma, Tinu Verma |
| 2008 | Golden babe | Actor/singer | Hindi | Music Video released worldwide |
| 2009 | Hamaar Gaon Hamaar Desh | Mamta | Bhojpuri | Lead appearance with Tinu Verma |
| 2009 | Aishwarya | Sara | Hindi | Lead appearance |
| 2010 | Hello Darling | Cameo | Hindi | Played cameo as assistant of Javed Jaffrey |
| 2011/12 | Kahani Chandrakanta Ki | Nagin Jwala | Hindi | Lead appearance on Sahara One |
| 2012 | Kartavya | Doctor | Bhojpuri | Lead appearance Pawan Singh |
| 2012 | Ghar Aaja Pardeshi | Savitri | Bhojpuri | Lead appearance with Sikandar Kharbanda |
| 2013 | Faraar | Champa | Hindi | Lead appearance |
| 2014 | Solar Swapnam | Pooja | Malayalam | Lead appearance |
| 2015 | Luv Phir Kabhi | Mrs. Oberoi | Hindi | Lead appearance |
| 2016 | Dekho Yeh Hai Mumbai Real Life | Neha | Hindi | Post production with Neeraj Vora, Vrajesh Hirjee, Preeti Jhangiani |
| 2017 | Don Ka Filmy Andaaz | Neha | Hindi | Post production with Sharat Saxena |
| 2018 | Secrett miss 2 | Samita | Hindi | Lead Appearance with Aryan Vaid |
| 2019 | Perfect Stranger | Sweety | Hindi | Web short horror film |
| 2019 | Baby angel music video | Actor/singer/writer | Hindi | Music video for B4U Music |
| 2020 | Andheri west film city | kangna kapoor | Hindi | Lead appearance web series. |
| 2021 | Rab tu | Actor/singer/writer | Hindi | Music video for B4U Music |
