= Aap To Aise Na The =

- Directed by: Ambrish Sangal
- Produced by: Mohan Kumar
- Starring: Raj Babbar, Ranjeeta Kaur, Deepak Parashar, Madan Puri, Om Shivpuri
- Cinematography: K. K. Mahajan
- Music by: Usha Khanna
- Release date: 5 December 1980
- Running time: 145 minutes
- Country: India
- Language: Hindi

Aap To Aise Na The (Translation: You Were Not Like This) is a 1980 Hindi movie directed by Ambrish Sangal, starring Raj Babbar, Deepak Parashar, Ranjeeta Kaur, Madan Puri and Om Shivpuri. The movie is still remembered for its song "Tu Is Tarah Se Meri Zindagi Mein Shamil Hai", which is sung by three Singers in three Singles. Two Singles by Manhar Udhas and Hemlata are in slow rhythm. One single by Mohammed Rafi is in fast rhythm.

== Synopsis ==
Orphaned at a very young age, Varsha Oberoi lives a wealthy lifestyle with her paternal uncle, Jain Oberoi, in Mumbai, and has traveled worldwide. She is in love with Vijay, a middle-classed young man, who runs a small furniture store, badly in debt, and lives with his widowed mom, a younger brother, Deepu, and sister, Nanhi, who are very friendly with Varsha. Then Vijay is reunited with his childhood friend, Vikram Chawla, who is welcomed with open arms by the entire family. It is then that Vijay's life turns around, he starts getting a lot of orders, gets out of debt, is able to buy a jeep to replace his motorbike, and moves to a comfortable bungalow. Then Vijay's life is turned upside down when he finds out that Vikram and Varsha are getting engaged. He meets with Varsha, who flatly tells him that she prefers marrying someone richer and wealthier. Angrily he confronts Vikram, who counsels him that Varsha had never really loved him. The question remains, did Varsha really love Vijay, and if so, what compelled her to change her mind?

== Cast ==
- Raj Babbar as Vijay
- Ranjeeta Kaur as Varsha Oberoi
- Deepak Parashar as Vikram Chawla
- Madan Puri as Mr. Khanna / Jagjit Singh (dual roles)
- Om Shivpuri as Jain Oberoi / Michael
- Raj Mehra as Police Commissioner
- Dulari as Vijay's mother
- Tamanna as Rita
- Bhagwan Dada as a policeman

== Soundtrack ==
Composed by Usha Khanna Lyrics by Nida Fazli and Indivar

#	Song	Singer
1	"Khuda Hi Juda Kare To Kare"	Kishore Kumar, Mohammed Rafi
2	"Tu Is Tarah Se Meri Zindagi Mein Shaamil Hai" - Slow (Male)	Manhar Udhas
3	"Tu Is Tarah Se Meri Zindagi Mein Shaamil Hai" - Slow (Female)	Hemlata
4	"Tu Is Tarah Se Meri Zindagi Mein Shaamil Hai" - Fast	Mohammed Rafi
5	"Yeh Aasmaan, Yeh Baadal"	Mohammed Rafi
6	"Mera Yaar Rahe Zinda, Mera Pyaar Rahe Zinda"	Asha Bhosle
7	"Kismat Ki Baazi Ka Faisla To Ho Gaya Hai"	Basavalingah Hiremath, Manhar Udhas, Suresh Wadkar
