= Green Signal =

- Directed by: Vijay Maddhala
- Written by: Satyadeva Sharma
- Produced by: Rudrapati Ramana Rao
- Starring: Revanth; Manas; Gopal Sai; Ashutosh; Anandhi; Rakshita; Manali Rathod; Dimple Chopade; Shilpi Sharma
- Cinematography: Swamy
- Edited by: S. B. Uddhav
- Music by: Jeevan Babu
- Release date: 30 May 2014
- Country: India
- Language: Telugu

Green Signal is a 2014 Telugu-language film directed by Vijay Maddhala and produced by Rudrapati Ramana Rao. It was co produced by Maruthi. It features an ensemble cast of Revanth, Shilpi Sharma, Gopal Sai, Maanas, Ashutosh, Rakshita, Manali Rathod, Dimple Chopade in the lead roles. The film is a remake of Hindi film Pyaar Ka Punchnama. The film released on 30 May 2014 in theaters.

== Cast ==
- Revanth as Naidu
- Manas as Sandeep Kumar (Sandy)
- Gopal Sai as Google
- Ashutosh as Prem
- Shilpi Sharma as Devika
- Anandhi as Jessie
- Manali Rathod as Sweety
- Dimple Chopade as Meera
- Chammak Chandra as Leena
- Raja Sreedhar as Mahesh
- Shravya
- Raja
- Kiran yadav
- lavanya yadav

== Critical reception ==
The Times of India wrote, "It's almost as if the movie is just an excuse for the filmmaker to stitch together as many of pj's (Poor jokes) as possible. To call it a sleaze fest will be putting it kindly". 123telugu.com wrote, "Green Signal is one film which lacks in many departments. The premise chosen and subject had good scope for hilarious entertainment a comedy. But a weak narrative and mediocre direction kills this promising story". fullhyd.com wrote, "The film has some distasteful gay humour and some terrible sexist humour. The director fails to infuse the required energy into the proceedings, and the famous 3-minute monologue from Pyaar Ka Punchnama is recreated terribly...The Maruthi brand of movies immediately needs to be shown the red light". Indiaglitz.com wrote, "Unlike in a profound film, there is no much substance in this film...apart from some good dialogues here and there, the film is not worth it if you have watched the original". apherald.com wrote, "This could have perhaps been a good break-out film for Vijay Maddhala, only if he could have worked on some refreshing subject rather spoiling some well made Bollywood films. As it stands, Green Signal isn't one to rush to the cinema, but instead best enjoyed in parts on DVD or telecast".

== Soundtrack ==
No.	Title	Singer(s)	Length
1.	"Dheko Dheko"	Sai Shivani
2.	"Masakalli"	Lipsika
3.	"Manasuna"	Anudeep
4.	"Ohh Romeo"	Pranavi
5.	"Janeja"	J. B, Ramya
6.	"Yevritho"	Sahithi
