= Sunil Agnihotri =

Indian film director

- Occupations: Director, Producer
- Years active: 1988 – present
- Known for: Chandrakanta

Sunil Agnihotri is a Bollywood film and TV producer and director. He has been described as the "king of television costume dramas".

== Work ==
Jai Ganesha was released in 1999 and was appreciated. He then went on to produce and direct in 1998 a series called Betaal Pachisi which was a very successful as a TV fantasy series. However that year, he faced a lawsuit involving the US.

King Features Syndicate filed a case arguing that Agnihotri had copied the idea of The Phantom comic strips for the Betaal series. However, the court said that only the unique expression of an idea could be protected, not the idea itself.

The serial was full of songs, which were released on cassette, and was shot like a musical.

== Filmography ==
Year	Film	Credits	Notes
1990	Danga Fasaad	Director/ Producer	
1992	Laat Saab	Director, producer	Action, Crime, Drama, Thriller
1994	Jai Kishen	Director	Action drama
1994	Chandrakanta	Director	TV series partly based on Devaki Nandan Khatri's novel Chandrakanta
1996	Yug	Director	TV series. Fictional drama about the Historical struggle against British Raj
1997	Daava	Director	Movie - drama
1997	Betaal Pachisi	Director/Producer	TV series
1999	Jai Ganesha	Director/Producer	TV series. The story of how Lord Ganesha still plays a part in people's everyday lives
2002	Aa Gale Lag Jaa	Director	TV series
2004	Alibaba Aur 40 Chor	Director	
2007–08	Chandramukhi	Director/Producer	91 episodes
2009	Black	Director/Producer	TV series - paranormal thriller starring film actor Mamik Singh
2011	Kaala Saaya	Director/Producer	Reprisal series of Black
2011	Kahani Chandrakanta Ki	Producer and Director	TV series based on Devaki Nandan Khatri's novel series 'Chandrakanta Santati'.
2014	Balwinder Singh Famous Ho Gaya	Producer and Director	Movie - Comedy
