= DD Metro =

Former Indian television channel

- Country: India
- Broadcast area: New Delhi, Mumbai, Kolkata and Chennai later in Lucknow
- Network: Doordarshan
- Headquarters: New Delhi

Programming
- Language: Hindi
- Picture format: 576i (SDTV)
- Timeshift service: Metro Gold

Ownership
- Owner: Prasar Bharati
- Sister channels: DD National; DD India; DD Bharati; DD News; DD Sports

History
- Launched: 9 August 1984
- Closed: 3 November 2003
- Replaced by: DD News
- Former names: DD-2

Links
- Website: ddindia.gov.in

DD Metro, also known as DD 2, was an Indian free-to-air television channel. It was launched in 1984 as DD2 in Delhi as an alternative to DD National. Later, it increased its coverage area by expanding to Mumbai, Kolkata and Chennai. In 1993, the channel was rebranded as DD-2 Metro. On 3 November 2003, the Prasar Bharati Corporation replaced DD Metro with their new news channel, DD News.

DD Metro programming consisted of many genres of television programmes, including family dramas boasting women as main characters, comedies, reality TV shows and others. The channel's prime-time shift Metro Gold was very popular, and it replaced Star Plus as the top Hindi-language entertainment channel in 2000 and 2001. DD Metro also used to broadcast some TV series from its sister channel, DD National. In addition, DD Metro was also known for dubbing English and other language movies into Hindi.

== Programmes ==
- Aap Ki Taarif
- Aane Wala Pal
- Ahankaar
- Ajnabi
- All The Best
- Bandhan
- Betaal Pachisi
- Bhabhi Maa
- Captain House
- Chandrakanta
- Champion
- Dard
- Dhun Dhamaka
- Dekh Bhai Dekh
- Deewar
- Duniya Ki Saire Kar Lo
- Ekka Begum Badshah
- Ek Raja Ek Rani
- Hello Bombay
- Hello Inspector
- Hindustani
- Idhar Kamaal Udhar Dhamaal
- Imtihaan
- Intezaar Aur Sahi
- Jai Hanuman
- Jannat
- Jaane Bhi Do Paaro
- Jeevan Ke Pal Do Pal
- Juhi
- Kabhi Yeh Kabhi Woh
- Kaliren
- Khabrein Bollywood Ki
- Kash-m-kash
- Khatta Meetha
- Krishna
- Lajwaab Talent Show
- Laut Aao
- Maan
- Mahashakti
- Meri Mrs. Chanchala
- Mr. Dhansukh
- Music Station
- Musibat Bolkey Aayee
- Nehle Pe Dehla
- Nukkad
- Nyaay
- Peechha Karo
- Padosan
- Papa
- Raja Aur Rancho
- Rozana
- The Samwaad Show
- Saahil
- Sapnay
- Sea Hawks
- Strivers & Achievers
- Sweekar Hai Mujhe
- Superhit Muqabla
- Teletubbies
- Tiger
- Tu Tu Main Main
- Wanderlust India
- Yeh Jo Hai Zindagi
- Zabaan Sambhalke

== See also ==
- Doordarshan Network
- DD National
- List of television stations in India
- Metro Gold
