= Vindu Dara Singh =

Indian actor (born 1964)

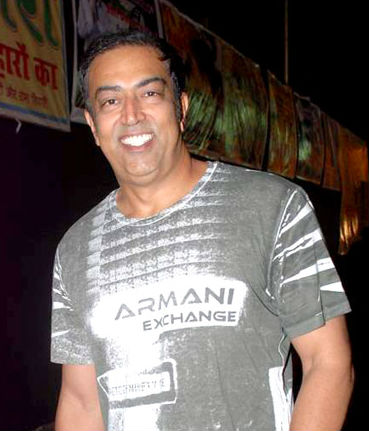
- Born: Virender Singh Randhawa; 6 May 1964 (age 62); Mumbai, Maharashtra, India
- Occupation: Actor
- Years active: 1992–present
- Height: 1.82 m (6 ft 0 in)
- Spouses: Farah Naaz (m. 1996; div. 2002); Dina Umarova (m. 2006)
- Children: 2
- Father: Dara Singh
- Relatives: See Randhawa family

Vindu Dara Singh (born Virender Singh Randhawa; 6 May 1964) is an Indian actor who performs in Hindi and Punjabi television films. He is the winner of the third season of Bigg Boss. He is known for having played the role of Lord Hanuman in the Jai Veer Hanuman television series on Sony TV.

== Career ==
Vindu made his acting debut in the 1994 Hindi film Karan. Then he acted in 1996 Punjabi film, Rab Dian Rakhan which was directed by his father. Since then, he has acted in many films, mostly in supporting roles.

He has also acted in TV serials, including the role of Hanuman in the TV serial Jai Veer Hanuman, much like his father did in Ramayan. He has also starred as a supervillain in TV serials on Star Plus, including Zaal in Ssshhhh...Koi Hai (2003) and Char Sau Chalis in Karma – Koi Aa Rahaa Hai Waqt Badalney. Vindu has also played an important role in the serial Black on 9X where he has played the character of Rajiv, a medium who can establish connections with spirits. Vindu Dara Singh has made appearance in television shows like Master Chef 2, Zor ka Jhatka, Nach Baliye, Comedy Circus, All Most Famous, and Maa Exchange. Singh also paired in a Pepsi commercial with Ranbir Kapoor.

He was the winner of the third season of the reality TV show Bigg Boss in 2009 and was also announced the most stylish and bold contestant to win the Chevrolet Cruze, a feat that had never occurred before, winning both the cash prize and car, and defeating Pravesh Rana and Poonam Dhillon. He was given the title Bade dil wala ('man with a golden heart') by his housemates.

Vindu Dara Singh has also worked in many successful films like Garv, Maine Pyaar Kyun Kiya, Partner, Khushboo, Team - The Force, Kisse Pyaar Karoon, Kambakkht Ishq, Maruti, Mujhse Shaadi Karogi, Son of Sardaar, Jatt James Bond, The Lion of Punjab, Housefull, and Housefull 2.

== Personal life ==
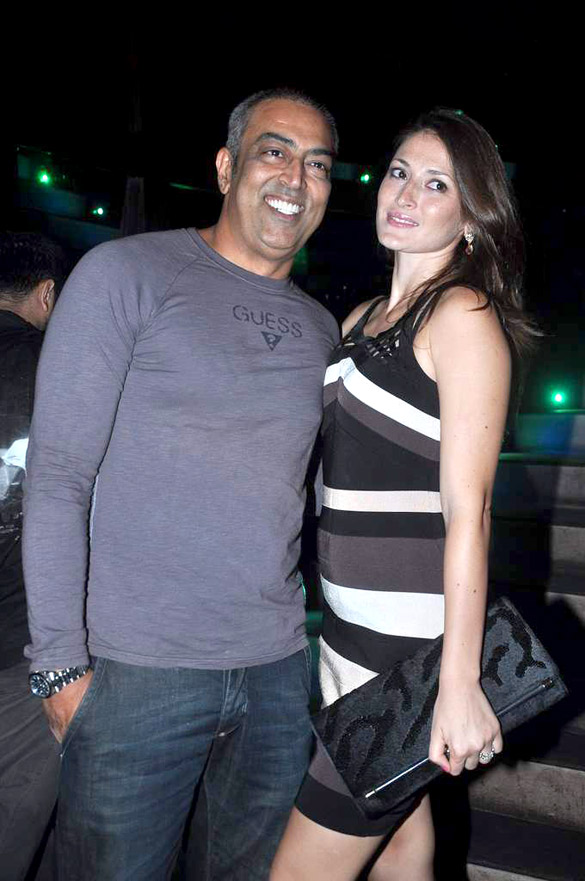
Vindu and his wife Dina Umarova

Vindu's father was the wrestler-turned-actor Dara Singh. He married actress Farah Naaz, with whom he had a son born on 6 February 1996. The couple divorced in 2002. Vindu married Russian model Dina Umarova in 2006, with whom he has a daughter born on 18 April 2009.

In May 2013, he was arrested for having links to bookies and involvement in the 2013 Indian Premier League spot-fixing scandal. Vindu has rejected these allegations.

== Filmography ==
=== Films ===
Year	Film	Role	Notes
1994	Karan	Karan	
1996	Rab Dian Rakhan		Punjabi film
2004	Garv		
2004	Mujhse Shaadi Karogi	Gang Member (Eagle Gang)	
2005	Maine Pyaar Kyun Kiya		
2006	Sri Ramadasu	Hanuman	Telugu film
2007	Partner	Mr.Chadha	
2008	Khushboo		
2009	Team - The Force		
2009	Maruti Mera Dosst	Hanuman	
2009	Kisse Pyaar Karoon	Inspector Jadhav	
2009	Kambakkht Ishq	Gulshan "Tiger" Shergill	
2010	Housefull		
2011	The Lion of Punjab	Inspector Balbir Singh	
2011	Sri Rama Rajyam	Hanuman	Telugu film
2012	Housefull 2	Sosa D'Costa	
2012	Joker	Sundi	
2012	Son of Sardar	Tito Singh Sandhu	
2013	Love Yoou Soniye	Billu	Punjabi film
2014	Jatt James Bond	Bank Manager	Punjabi film
2022	Forensic	Constable Rawat	
2025	Son of Sardar 2	Tittu	
2026	Welcome to the Jungle	Ghoni	

=== Dubbing roles ===
Film title	Original Voice	Character	Dub language	Original language	Original Year Release	Dub Year Release	Notes
The Incredibles	Samuel L. Jackson	Lucius Best / Frozone (Barfila)	Hindi	English	2004	2004	The Hindi dub released as "Hum Hain Lajawab". Vrajesh Hirjee dubbed this character in sequel.

=== Television ===
Year	Serial	Role	Channel	Notes
1995–1996	Jai Veer Hanuman	Hanuman	Sony TV	
1996–1997	Yug	Bheema Daaku	DD National	
1997	Betaal Pachisi	Zulmato	DD National	
1999	Jai Ganesha	Shani	DD National	Zee TV
1999–2000	Gul Sanobar	Turki		
2000	Vishnu Puran	Hanuman	Zee TV	
2001	Draupadi	Bheema	Sahara One	
2001–2004	Ssshhhh...Koi Hai	Various roles	Star Plus	
2007	Chandramukhi	Bhanupratap	DD National	
2009	Black	Rajeev Saxena	9X	
2011	Kaala Saaya	Rajeev Saxena	Sahara One	Reprisal series of Black
2011	Adaalat	Sanjay Bhagat	Sony TV	
2011–2012	Kahani Chandrakanta Ki	Abhimanyu Singh	Sahara One	
2013	Mrs. Kaushik Ki Paanch Bahuein	Bhushan (Foolish Man)	Zee TV	
2020	Ayodhya Ki Ramleela	Hanuman		
2020	Savdhaan India		Star Bharat	

=== Reality shows ===
Year	Serial	Role	Channel	Notes
2009	Bigg Boss 3	Contestant	Colors TV	Winner
2011	Maa Exchange	Contestant	Sony TV	
2011	Zor Ka Jhatka: Total Wipeout	Contestant	NDTV Imagine	
2013	Welcome - Baazi Mehmaan-Nawaazi ki	Contestant	Life OK	
2015	Power Couple	Contestant	Sony TV	
2016	Laughter Da Master Season 2 & 3	Judge	PTC Punjabi	
2018	Mr Punjab	Judge	PTC Punjabi	
2019	Nach Baliye 9	Contestant	Star Plus	
2019	Bigg Boss 13	Guest	Colors TV	
2020	Bigg Boss 14	Guest	Colors TV	
