= Sunil Verma =

Indian activist (1972–2006)

Sunil Verma (1972 − 16 August 2006), himself a victim, was a campaigner for the rights of victims affected by the Bhopal disaster, the deadliest industrial disaster as of 2007. He testified in a case against the company when it came up for hearing in New York City in 1986. He formed the Children Against Carbide organization in 1987, when he was fifteen.

== The gas disaster ==
Born in Bhopal in 1972, the son of a carpenter, Verma lived in JP Nagar, near the plant run by Union Carbide, now a subsidiary of Dow Chemicals, when the gas leak occurred on 3 December 1984. He and his family tried to escape, as the poisonous cloud of methyl isocyanate gas descended on the slum settlement in Madhya Pradesh's state capital. The family members got separated, and Sunil Verma, with eyes burning and chest in pain, managed to board a bus that took him to Hoshangabad, about 70 km (44 miles) away. He lost consciousness and was taken to the district hospital.

He returned to Bhopal a week later to find both his parents, three sisters and two brothers dead. His two younger siblings, a sister aged 10 and a brother of two-and-half, were the only other survivors. Relatives took the children to Lucknow, but the children returned to Bhopal, surviving on the generosity of neighbours, both Hindu and Muslim. Sunil's sister and brother moved to the SOS village – a shelter set up by a charity to house orphans of the gas tragedy – while Sunil managed to study into his teenage years.

== Activism ==
He was chosen to lay the foundation stone for the first People's Clinic in Bhopal for the gas victims in June 1985. Children Against Carbide mobilized orphans and other victims to demand justice for survivors of the disaster. The issues involved were those of compensation and health.

Verma was also a member of the Bhopal Group for Information and Action, and participated in every anniversary rally to mark the disaster, as his mental health deteriorated.

In February 1989, the Indian government settled out of court with Union Carbide, the latter making a US$470 million payout as part of the deal. Verma traveled to Ireland, the Netherlands and the United Kingdom to mobilize support against the settlement. He was arrested in Houston, Texas, when he attempted to table an environmental report at the Union Carbide annual meeting. A public outcry resulted in his quick release. Verma had received US$2,200 from the claims tribunal disbursing the settlement, though he was entitled to nearly four times that sum. He attempted to start a business with the money, but the attempt ended in failure. He was granted a house as part of a government relief scheme, but generous to a fault, he gave it to a homeless friend.

He worked as a volunteer at the Sambhavna Trust Clinic for survivors and even though he was unemployed at that time, he refused to take money for his work. He also toured India, speaking out for those in need. Along with others orphaned by the gas, Sunil sat on hunger strike in Bhopal for six days in 2003, demanding the jobs that the government had offered years before.

== Illness ==
In March 1997 Sunil started "hearing voices in his head". He also suffered from insomnia and imagined people were plotting to kill him. By June 1997 his condition worsened and he often ran away from home. He had attempted suicide several times. He was finally diagnosed with paranoid schizophrenia and began treatment.

He hanged himself in 2006, leaving a note behind that he was committing suicide not because he was mentally unsound but with all his wits about him. After Sunil's death, many people from the Netherlands, the U.S., South Africa and other countries raised funds in his memory to establish a mental health centre.
