= Vinod Kapoor =

Indian television actor

- Born: Mumbai, Maharashtra, India
- Occupation: Actor
- Years active: 1987–present

Vinod Kapoor is an Indian actor who works in Hindi cinema and TV serials. He played the role of Dushasana in the Indian TV serial Mahabharat and essayed the role of Vibhishana in the TV serial Vishnu Puran and Ramayan.

== Early life and career ==
Vinod Kapoor first appeared in Yeh Pyar Nahin, the 1988 Salim Khan and Huma Khan starrer. The movie by itself is little known. It was his second project for which he is most well known. He played the role of Dushasana in BR Chopra's Mahabharat. After this he had a fairly steady job in TV serials, most notably BR Chopra's Kanoon in which he played the role of Inspector Shakti Singh, appearing in a good number of episodes. Kapoor is also known for his essaying of the role of Vibhishana in the 2008 TV series Ramayan by Sagar Arts as well as in the 2000 TV series Vishnu Puran.

== Filmography ==
=== Films ===
Year	Film	Role	Notes
1987	Uttar Dakshin	Anju's Husband	
1988	Yeh Pyar Nahin		
2004	Alibaba Aur 40 Chor		
2010	Rokkk		
2013	Mahabharat Aur Barbareek	Dushasana	

== Television ==
Year	Serial	Role	Ref.
1987	Chunni	Mr. Singh	
1989–1990	Mahabharat	Dushasan	
1993–1996	Kanoon	Inspector Shakti Singh	
1994–1996	Chandrakanta	Amarjeet Singh / Barkat Khan	
1995	Tehkikaat – The Ghost Of John Perriera	Dheeraj Chawla (Episode 48 to Episode 50)	
1996–1997	Yug	Ranjeet Basu	
1997–1998	Mahabharat Katha	Dushasan	
1998	Junoon	Advocate	
1999	Jai Mata Ki	Chikasur	
1999–2000	Gul Sanobar		
1999–2001	Jai Ganesha	Indra	
2001–2002	Jai Mahabharat	Dronacharya	
2002	Vishnu Puran	Vibhishana	
2003	1857 Kranti	William Stephen Raikes Hodson	
2004	Hatim	Anant	
2004	Aakrosh	Doctor	
2005	Hotel Kingston		
2006	Dharti Ka Veer Yodha Prithviraj Chauhan	Someshswar Mantri Dushyant	
2006	Raavan	Gauthama/Agasthya	
2007	Ssshhhh...Phir Koi Hai - Senapati	Hanumant Singh (Episode 25)	
2007	Ssshhhh...Phir Koi Hai - Nayi Maa	Naresh (Episode 60–61)	
2008	Ramayan	Vibhishan	
2009	Black	Mr. Malhotra	
2011	Kaala Saaya	Mr. Malhotra	Reprisal series of Black
2011	Kahani Chandrakanta Ki	Chandilal	
2011–2012	Shama	Akbar Ali	
2012	Sabse Bade Ladaiya	Mahil (King of Baghelkhand)	
2013	Fear Files: Darr Ki Sacchi Tasvirein	Arafat’s Father (Episode 87)	
2014–2016	Dard Ka Rishta	Amarnath Sharma	
2016	Siya Ke Ram	Sumantra	
2018–2019	Aladdin – Naam Toh Suna Hoga	Mustafa	
2021–2022	Kaamnaa	Rane	
2023	Dhruv Tara – Samay Sadi Se Pare	Maharishi	
2023–2024	Karmadhikari Shanidev	Chitrarath	
2024–2025	Main Dil Tum Dhadkan		
2025–2026	Saru	Indravadan Bajaj	
2025–2026	Maana Ke Hum Yaar Nahi	Baldev Mehra	
