= Superhit Muqabla =

- Genre: Musical Countdown
- Created by: Irfan Khan & Harish Thawaani
- Written by: Pawan K Sethhi, Parvati Walia, Siraj Syed,
- Directed by: Irfan Khan
- Presented by: Ekta Kapoor; Baba Sehgal; Kruttika Desai; Shahrukh Khan; Shilpa Shetty; Chunky Pandey; Simran
- Opening theme: "Superhit Muqabla" by Baba Sehgal
- Country of origin: India
- Original language: Hindi
- No. of episodes: 150

Production
- Producers: Irfan Khan & Harish Thawani
- Editor: Salil Malik
- Running time: Approx. 60 minutes

Original release
- Network: DD Metro
- Release: 1993 – 1994

Superhit Muqabla is a countdown show of songs that was broadcast on the Indian TV channel DD Metro. Kruttika Desai did most of the shows including covering Michael Jackson's History tour in Bangkok Simultaneously the program was also shot in the Tamil language and was aired from DD Chennai at the same time. Several failed attempts were made to revive the show.
