= Hello Darling =

2010 Indian film by Manoj Tiwari

- Poster
- Directed by: Manoj Tiwari
- Written by: Pankaj Trivedi; Sachin Shah
- Produced by: Ashok Ghai
- Starring: Gul Panag; Celina Jaitly; Isha Koppikar
- Cinematography: Ravi Yadav
- Edited by: Sanjay Ingle; Chirag Jain
- Music by: Songs: Pritam; Score: Sanjoy Chowdhury
- Production company: Mukta Arts
- Release date: 27 August 2010
- Running time: 104 minutes
- Country: India
- Language: Hindi

Hello Darling is a 2010 Indian Hindi-language comedy film directed by Manoj Tiwari and produced by Ashok Ghai, starring Gul Panag, Celina Jaitly, Isha Koppikar and Javed Jaffrey in the lead roles. Sunny Deol makes a special appearance. It is an unofficial adaptation of the American film 9 to 5 (1980).

== Plot ==
Mansi and Candy work in a fashion designer firm. Satvari Chaudary joins their firm for a job. Mansi and Candy inform Satvari of their flirtatious boss, Hardhik Vasu, whose desire is to sleep with hot women. Everyone in the firm knows that Mansi always prepares coffee for Hardhik. One day, Mansi, who is fed up with Hardhik stealing her work, accidentally mixes Rat Kill in his coffee. As Hardhik is about to sip his coffee, he falls off his chair. But it creates the impression that he died from the poison.

Fearful of getting caught, the three girls (Mansi, Candy and Satvari) head to the hospital to make things right. Due to a misunderstanding, the three girls think he's dead. Coincidentally, another patient died, which they think is Hardhik. Mansi and Satvari hide his "body" in the back of their taxi, but soon they realize it's the wrong body. The next day at work, the three girls find out Hardhik is still alive, who also recorded the girls taking out a dead body from the hospital. Hardhik offers the girls to avoid jail on one condition: they must accompany Hardhik to Kandala for 7 days. The day before leaving, the girls contact Hardhik under the pretext of sleeping with him. After a bit of song and dance, they make him unconscious by dousing a cloth with methylated spirits and placing it on his face.

Meanwhile, Hardhik's wife finds out he had a supposed affair with Candy. To reform him, she calls Poolan Bhai, who runs a place to reform men of their flirtatious deeds. Due to a misunderstanding, they think her husband is Rocky, who is Candy's boyfriend. Hardhik manages to escape from the house (the girls chained him that night; he was unconscious. The girls then contemplate whether to contact Nikhi Bajaj, the manager of the firm. He reaches there and disapproves of Hardhik's contract for renewal and sends him to Bangladesh. Nikhil appoints Mansi as vice president and encourages her to marry her fiancé, Ashish. Nikhil himself ends up falling in love with Satvari, whereas Candy is reunited with Rocky. The film ends in Bangladesh, where Hardhik realizes his boss is gay.

== Cast ==
- Gul Panag as Mansi Joshi
- Celina Jaitly as Candy D'Souza
- Isha Koppikar as Satvari Chaudhary
- Sunny Deol as Nikhil Bajaj (special appearance)
- Javed Jaffrey as Hardhik Vasu
- Chunky Pandey as Rocky, Candy’s boyfriend
- Divya Dutta as Hardhik's wife
- Mukesh Tiwari as Inspector Eagle
- Sanjay Mishra as "Dead" Patient
- Vrajesh Hirjee as Thief
- Meghna Patel as Hardhik's assistant
- Anil Mange as Ashish, Mansi's fiancé
- Seema Biswas as Poolan Bhai
- Vivek Shauq as Ajay
- Rajesh Khattar Hardhik's new boss
- Kurush Deboo as Rustomjee

== Soundtrack ==
Hello Darling

Soundtrack album by Pritam
- Released: 27 July 2010
- Genre: Feature film soundtrack
- Label: T-Series

The soundtrack was composed by Pritam.

=== Track list ===
No.	Title	Lyrics	Singer(s)	Length
1.	"Working Girls"	Shabbir Ahmed	Shweta Pandit, Ritu Pathak, Priyadarshini	1:56
2.	"Aa Jaane Jaan'"	Shabbir Ahmed	Javed Jaffrey, Akriti Kakkar, Antara Mitra	2:57
3.	"Band Baaja"	Ashish Pandit	Richa Sharma, Ritu Pathak, Rana Mazumder	2:15
4.	"Dil Toh Saala"	Shabbir Ahmed	Sunidhi Chauhan	1:20
5.	"Attrah Baras Ki"	Shabbir Ahmed	Suzanne D'Mello	2:27
6.	"Band Baaja" (Remix)	Shabbir Ahmed	Richa Sharma, Ritu Pathak, Rana Mazumder - (DJ A-Myth)	2:15

== Reception ==
Taran Adarsh of Bollywood Hungama gave the film 1 out of 5 stars, writing, "On the whole, Hello Darling tries hard to make you laugh, but falls flat on its face. In fact, this comedy is more of a tragedy for the viewer". Preeti Arora of Rediff.com gave the film 1 and a half out of 5 stars, writing, "Hello Darling needs to be avoided at all costs. Unless of course gnashing your teeth and wasting your money on mindless, tedious comedy is your favourite hobby".
