= Chandrakanta (1994 TV series) =

1990s Indian fantasy television series

- The main cast of Chandrakanta: Shahbaz Khan as Prince Virendra Singh and Shikha Swaroop as Princess Chandrakanta.
- Based on: Chandrakanta by Devaki Nandan Khatri
- Written by: Devaki Nandan Khatri; Kamleshwar (writer); Ranbir Pushp
- Story by: Nirja Guleri
- Directed by: Sunil Agnihotri
- Creative director: Sunil Verma
- Starring: See below
- Narrated by: Harish Bhimani
- Theme music composer: Usha Khanna
- Opening theme: "Chandrakanta" by Sonu Nigam And Vinod Rathod
- Country of origin: India
- Original language: Hindi
- No. of seasons: 2
- No. of episodes: 133

Production
- Executive producers: Shrey Guleri; Sahil Guleri
- Producer: Nirja Guleri
- Production location: Film City Mumbai
- Cinematography: Nadeem Khan
- Camera setup: Multi-camera
- Running time: 52 minutes
- Production company: M/s Prime Channel

Original release
- Network: DD National
- Release: 1994

Chandrakanta is an Indian fantasy television series partly based on Devaki Nandan Khatri's 1888 novel of the same name. It was originally telecast on DD National between 1994 and 1996 and was created, written, produced, and directed by Nirja Guleri. The serial was pulled off air by Doordarshan in 1996 and the producers had to file a suit in court for reinstatement. Reruns of the show also aired on StarPlus, Sony Entertainment Television.

== Cast and characters ==
- Pankaj Dheer as Shivdutt, King of Chunargarh
- Shahbaz Khan as Kunwar Virendra Vikram Singh
- Shikha Swaroop as Princess Chandrakanta
- Mukesh Khanna as Janbaaz and Meghavat
- Javed Khan as Tej Singh
- Irrfan Khan as Badrinath / Somnath (twin brothers)
- Akhilendra Mishra as Kroor Singh, popularly known as Yakkoo
- Kausambi Ganguly as Devsena
- Mamik Singh as Surya / Deva
- Nimai Bali as Surya (original)
- Vijayendra Ghatge as Sumer Singh
- Parikshit Sahni as Maharaja Surendra Singh (King of Naugarh)
- Durga Jasraj as Rani Kalavati
- Rajendra Gupta as Pandit Jagannath / Shani (twin brothers)
- Krutika Desai Khan as twin sisters Sabhya and Ramya, Amba (Vishkanya), and Jwala, the dacoit
- Sonika Gill as Amrapali, Amba's mother
- Anu Dhawan as Tara (Vishkanya)
- Kalpana Iyer as Dum Dumi Maai. Iyer also plays Sultana, an ally of Tara
- Rupal Patel as Jamuna, who is a cousin sister of Roopmati, a villain
- Vinod Kapoor as Amarjeet Singh / Barkat Khan
- Brownie Parashar as Ajgar
- Aasif Sheikh as Naagmani Devata (Snake King)
- Surendra Pal as King of Vijaygarh
- Pradeep Rawat as Himmat Singh
- Arun Mathur as Vaidh Baba, Damini's father
- Deepak Parashar as Devdutt, Shivdutt's father
- Sudha Chandran as Satyavati, Shivdutt's mother
- Bhushan Jeevan as Dalpati Devata
- Roopa Ganguly as Damini, Vishwajeet Singh's mother
- Vaquar Shaikh as Vishwajeet Singh, the illegal son of Raja Surendra Singh and Damini.
- Brahmachari as Nazim Aiyyar
- Arjun (Firoz Khan) as the magician mentor of Vishvajeet Singh
- Syed Badr-ul Hasan Khan Bahadur
- Varsha Usgaonkar as Roopmati Naagraani.
- Ashalata Kashmiri as Shivdutt's Daya Maa
- Mohsin Memon child artist as little boy Shiva seen with A K Hangal & Pankaj Dheer
- Nadeem Shaikh as child artist who is cousin brother of Badrinath/Somnath

== Criticism ==
Kamlapati Khatri, the grandson of the novel's author, has said that the producer "had not done justice to the soul of Khatri's Chandrakanta". He has also accused the producers of willfully misrepresenting certain concepts from the novel, such as "tilism" (kind of a maze) and "ayyari" (spying), and showing them as "jadu-tona" (sorcery), as well as criticizing the characters and the sequences in the Chunar fort for being overly exaggerated, and how far into the show Chandrakanta appeared.
