= Ssshhhh...Koi Hai =

Indian horror television series

- Genre: Horror; Supernatural
- Created by: Prem Krishen Malhotra; Shahid Nazir; Sunil Mehta (Season 1); Aditya Narain Singh (producer); Abhimanyu Singh; Bijesh Jayarajan; (Seasons 1–3)
- Written by: Arshad Syed; Aditya Narain Singh; Imtiaz Baghdadi; Jayesh Patil; Abhinav Kashyap; (Seasons 1)
- Creative directors: Mahim Joshi (Season 1); Dipti Kalwani (Season 1); Vincent Franklin (Seasons 2 and 3)
- Starring: See below
- Opening theme: Sssshhh... Phir Koi Hai
- Country of origin: India
- Original language: Hindi
- No. of seasons: 3
- No. of episodes: 393 (list of episodes)

Production
- Executive producers: Alex Oommpm; Manisha Tripathi (Season 1); Anirudh; Mani; Randhir Rai; Tanveer Alam; Nishith Madiar
- Producers: Aditya Narain Singh; Sunil Mehta (Season 1); Uday Singh Phoolka (Season 1); Abhimanyu Raj Singh (Seasons 1–3)
- Cinematography: Hiroo Keswani; Shakil B. Khan; Subhransu Das; Sandip Yadav
- Editors: Ganga Kacharla; K. Rajgopal; Shachindra Vats
- Camera setup: Multi Camera
- Running time: 45 minutes
- Production companies: Cinevistaas Limited (Season 1); Contiloe Entertainment (Season 1–3)

Original release
- Network: Star Plus (season 1); Star One (season 2–3)
- Release: 27 July 2001 – 16 May 2010

Related
- Vikraal Aur Gabraal

Ssshhhh... Koi Hai (transl. "Ssshhhh... Someone's there") is an Indian horror thriller television anthology series created by Cinevistaas Limited and Contiloe Entertainment for Star Plus. The first season was created by them together, while later seasons were only created by Aditya Narain Singh & Abhimanyu Singh and were aired on Star Plus' sister channel Star One. The series which premiered on 27 July 2001, ran for three seasons ending on 16 May 2010.

Mamik Singh, Salil Ankola, Neha Devi Singh, Jiten Lalwani, Alex Upadhyay, Shahbaz Khan, Gufi Paintal, Shonali Malhotra, Reshma Khan, KK Goswami, Shiva Rindani, Vindu Dara Singh, Ronit Roy, Mac Mohan, Sunil Grover, Murali Sharma, Hrishikesh Pandey, Kamya Panjabi, Girish Jain Gaurav Chopra others have starred in the series. Shakti Anand, Indian TV actor, also worked in the first season and two episodes of the second season.

== Plot ==
=== Season 1 (2001–2004) ===
Initial episodes were the stories related from every aspect of horror and thrillers and in later episodes a ghostbuster was introduced named Vikraal, who captures ghosts. Later again, the show takes turn over after the return of Mayakaal, who was the most powerful wizard and captured Vikraal. Guru Satyacharya observed that Vikraal could not handle the situation alone, and therefore decided to summon Mritunjay's daughter Bijli and Captain Kishan to help Vikraal. These three defeated Mayakaal. These ghostbusters' mission was to get rid of all the ghosts and evil spirits in the world. These three ghost-busters were called the Trikaal, who were always ready to fight evil powers.

=== Season 2 (2006–2009) ===
The second season was titled Sssshhh... Phir Koi Hai, (transl. Sssshhh... Someone's there again) which was a weekly series, airing Friday and Saturday nights. On 6 July 2007, a special series named Sssshhh... Phir Koi Hai – Aryaamann of four episodes was telecast. In this series, Aryaamann, a ghost buster is on a mission to cast away all negative powers in the world. This special series ended on 27 July 2007.

In December 2007, the show returned with a biweekly telecast, i.e. Friday and Saturday, each story being split into two episodes. In January 2009, the format of the series was changed. Each story was made to run for eight weeks. One of them was Intezar. The story was about two lovers Mohan and Radhika. Mohan was the son of a Thakur in Kishangarh who had gone abroad for studies. He comes back and meets Ambika (a witch). When he reaches his home, he meets Radhika (his lover). Ambika was hired by Dashrath Singh, a rival of Mohan's father. He wanted all of his property. Ambika plays such a game that Mohan and Radhika start disbelieving each other. Ambika kills the fathers of Mohan and Radhika, and the blame is pinned on Mohan and Radhika respectively. Mohan believes that Radhika killed his father and Radhika believes that Mohan killed her father. Ambika tricks Mohan and snatches all of his property, giving it to Dashrath Singh. Ambika wanted Mohan for her purpose but she start loving him. Mohan's mother asks Mohan to marry Ambika. At this time, Radhika gets to know the truth of Ambika and reveals the truth to Mohan. Ambika tricks Radhika and kills her. Before killing her, she makes her believe that Mohan killed her. After hearing about Radhika's death, Mohan jumps from a cliff.

A second janam (rebirth) is shown in which Mohan is born as Madhav and Radhika is born Meera, while Ambika just changes her name from Ambika to Kalika. Madhav is an engineer who has come to Kishangarh for making a dam. He gets flashes of his previous birth. He then meets Kalika and Kalika narrates her the story of Mohan, Radhika and Ambika in which she makes Madhav believe that Radhika was the witch but Madhav having flashes and knowing a little bit of truth doesn't believe her. Meera is the daughter of Durgadevi, the owner of the haveli (Dashrath Singh's daughter-in-law). She often gets possessed by the spirit of Radhika and forgets herself. Both of them don't know that they are reborn as Mohan and Radhika. One day both of them get to know the truth but the truth Meera learned it is a lie. She thinks that Mohan killed her. She then meets Madhav and tried to kill him but something stops her. Madhav tells her the real truth and they both unite. Madhav (Mohan) and Meera (Radhika) kill Ambika and they both get married at the end of the drama.

=== Season 3 (2010) ===
Sssshhh... Phir Koi Hai 3 aired on Friday and Saturday evenings, later shifting to every Saturday and Sunday on 10 April 2010. This season had only one story.

The season introduces a very old story set in the past. It had also introduced a prophecy that was made centuries ago. It's the story of two brothers (Ajinkya and Veer), whose lives are destined to intertwine. Ajinkya has been in search of his mother for the past twenty years. Ajinkya and Veer join hands only to realize eventually they are the lost brothers – but with completely different motives. The powerful demon king – Vikrant destroys the much-feared demon-slayer – Saarthak. He tries to destroy his two sons also. Ajinkya manages to find his mother but is shocked to know she had never transformed. He manages to kill Vikrant, but that wouldn't be the end of him. He enters Vayika's body, who is injured in a struggle and in order to finish Vikrant completely, ends up killing Vayika.

== Cast ==
=== Main ===
- Mamik Singh (2002–2003) as Vikraal and Vijaykaal (Vikraal's Father), the ghostbuster.
- Salil Ankola (2003–2004) as Vikraal and the leader of the Trikaal force.
- Shonali Malhotra (2002–2003)/Deepika Sharma (2003)/Nupur Joshi (2003)/Reshma Khan (2003–2004) as Lily, an assistant of Vikraal, later Trikaal's assistant. She is secretly in love with Vikraal.
- KK Goswami as Gabroo (2002–2004), A dwarf ghost, also an assistant of Vikraal and later Trikaal's assistant. Gabroo has feelings for Lily.
- Shakti Anand (2002–2003) / Manav Gohil (2003) / Jiten Lalwani (2003–2004) as Captain Kishan, a forest officer and a very good friend of Vikraal. He is also a former classmate of Vikraal. Later, Captain Kishan had joined the Trikaal force.
- Tarana Raja (2003) / Aditi Pratap (2003–2004) as Kareena. Captain Kishan's dear friend.
- Neha Devi Singh as Sameera/Bijli, the ghostbuster, one of the three members of the Trikaal force. She is the daughter of Mritunjay. (2003–2004).
- Prabhat Bhattacharya as Naqaab, Trikaal's secret agent (2004).
- Shahbaz Khan as Shakaal/Mayakaal (2002–2004)
- Goolistan Gandhi as Mrs. Mistry, Sameera's (Bijli) boss. The owner of the ladies' parlour.
- Rishi Kapoor as Pawan, Sameera's (Bijli) close friend.
- Murali Sharma as Murli/Mrityukaal (2003–2004).
- Vishnu Sharma as Guru Satyacharya (2002–2004)
- Nawab Shah as Drohkaal, a rogue ghostbuster and a former friend of Vikraal (2002–2003).
- Tom Alter as Mritunjay and in various characters (2001–2004)
- Raayo S. Bakhirta as Rahul in Victoria No-401
- Mukesh Jadhav as Koeta (2002–2004)
- Namrata Thapa as various characters (2002–2003)
- Neha Pendse as Madhuri, Nemolika, in various characters (2001–2003)
- Simple Kaul in various characters (2003–2004)
- Ritu Seth as various characters (2001–2004)
- Kamya Panjabi as various characters (2001–2004)
- Parmeet Sethi as Ghost (2001)
- Deepshikha Nagpal as Zehreena, Zaalima, in various characters (2001–2004)
- Manini Mishra as various characters
- Malini Kapoor as various characters (2001)
- Nigaar Khan as Sarr Katika, Sonika
- Vindu Dara Singh as Senapati Sangram Singh, Zaal/various characters
- Lalit Parimoo as various characters
- Gufi Paintal as various characters

=== Recurring ===
- Mamik Singh as Tarun in "Joker" (Episode 5); as Sunny in "Jalwa" (Episode 16).
- Yashpal Sharma as Jaspal in "Vidyut" (Episode 1).
- Irrfan Khan as Amar in "Mumkin" (Episode 9)
- Paintal as Madhav in "Bhediya" (Episode 3); as the archeologist in "Khoj" [Episode 15].
- Rahil Azam as Mandaar in "Raakh" (Episode 22)
- Tina Parekh as Divya in "Vidyut" (Episode 1).
- Himani Shivpuri as Maaya in "Jazeera" (Episode 31).
- Neha Dhupia as Archana in "Woh Kaun Thi" (Episode 14).
- Tanaaz Irani as (Shapeshifting spirit) Gulaab in "Vikraal Ka Sangharsh" and "Vikraal Aur Karamati Coat" (Episode 78 and Episode 82)
- Ravi Kishan as Jalnath in "Bijli Aur Jalikaa" (146) and "Vikraal Aur Jalnath" (Episode 147).
- Ronit Roy as Guddu in "Jalwa" (Episode 16); as Bosco in "GDA 2551" (Episode 26); as Inspector in "Meow" (Episode 48).
- Shakti Singh as Dr. Dhawan in "Meow" (Episode 48)
- Shruti Seth as Anjali in "Khel Khel Mein" (Episode 13); as Debby in "GDA 2551" (Episode 26).
- Kamya Panjabi as Nisha in "Shart" (Episode 17)/as Vandana in "Rang Barse" (Episode 36) / as Lilliput ki Rani in "Vikraal Lilliput Ki Nagri Mein" (Episode 75)/ as Jyoti in "Vikraal Adhoori Duniya Mai" (Episode 89), "Vikraal Aur Gorganza" (Episode 90) and "Vikraal Aur Time Machine" (Episode 91).
- Parmeet Sethi as Ghost in "Shart" (Episode 17).
- Meghna Kothari as Mehek in "Painter" (Episode 11).
- Hrishikesh Pandey as Rahul Sharma in "Shart" (Episode 17) / Senapati Adityavardhan in "Mrityudand" (Episode 39).
- Chetan Hansraj as Raja Saab / Pahadi Raja in "Doosri Dulhan" (Episode 18)/ Michael in "Ghar" (Episode 28)/ Sotya in "Samandar" (Episode 35)/ Benu in "Vikraal Aur Bhayanak Bansuri" (Episode 59)/ Dracula in "Vikraal Aur Dracula : Part 1 – Part 3" (Episode 86,87,88).
- Pradeep Rawat as the Jinn/Ginnie in "Jinnat" (Episode 46); as Pretaal in "Vikraal Aur Khauffnaak Kada" (Episode 55).
- Namrata Thapa as Nikita (Pahadi Raaja's Sister) in "Doosri Dulhan" (Episode 18); as Sonia in "Woh Kaun Thi" (Episode 14) etc. (various characters).
- Keerti Gaekwad Kelkar as Sunehri in "Rang Barse"
- Ravee Gupta as Queen Savitri / Shilpa, in "Mrityudand"; as Cateena in "Vikraal Aur Cateena Ke Keher", as Naagika in "Vikraal Aur Naagika"(Various Characters).
- Sonia Kapoor as Rani Devyani, Brahmarakshasi in "Woh Kaun Thi" (Episode 14).
- Narayani Shastri as Ruby in "Anushaasan" (Episode 45)
- Parag Tyagi as Mercury Man in "Bijli Aur Mercury Man" (Episode 123).
- Karanvir Bohra as Neeraj in "Padosi" (Episode 34).
- Shital Thakkar as Kiran in "Anushaasan" (Episode 45) / Reva in "Vikraal Aur Haunted House" (Episode 93).
- Darshan Kumar as Manoj in "Vikraal Aur Kaffan" (Episode 100).
- Gaurav Chanana as Shekhar in "Dosti" (Episode 43).
- Kanika Kohli as Mona in "Anushaasan", in various characters.
- Kishwer Merchant as Payal in "Anushaasan" (Episode 45) /as Shara in "Vikraal Aur Dracula (Part-1 & 2)" (Episode 86,87) /as Shruti in "Captain and the Curse" (Episode 101)
- Anju Mahendru as Warden Sheela Anuragi in "Anushaasan" (Episode 45).
- Gaurav Chopra as Vineet in "Jaanwar" (Episode 49).
- Ketki Dave as Mangla in "Vikraal Aur Mangla Ki Mistake" (Episode 61).
- Karishma Mehta as Payal in "Vikraal Aur Betaal Ka Anth"
- Abhimanyu Singh as Aditya in "Vikraal Aur Haunted House" (Episode 93), in "Vikraal Aur Maut Ki Safaari" (Episode 121).
- Kiran Dubey as Shirley in "Vidyut" (Episode 1); as Vishaka in "Bijli Aur Vish Kanya" (Episode 118).
- Sunaina Gulia as Kitty in "Vikraal Aur Betaal"/ "Vikraal Aur Time Machine"/ "Vikraal Aur Wishing Well"
- Kunickaa Sadanand as Mrs Malini in "Vikraal Aur Alkazam Ka Brush" to "Vikraal Aur Dracula"
- Pracheen Chauhan as anub in "Vikraal Aur Alkatzar: The Lost City" (Episode 94)
- Ritu Chaudhary as Koyena in "Vikraal Aur Alkatzar: The Lost City" (Episode 94)
- Supriya Karnik as Ghost in "Khel" (Episode 41).
- Shawar Ali as Raaja Vikram Singh in "Jungle" (Episode 21).
- Nilanjana Sharma as Radhika in "Chehra" (Episode 23).
- Anand Suryavanshi as Himanshu in "Vikraal Aur Pahadi Bungla/Bungalow".
- Vishal Kotian as Piyush in "Doosri Dulhan" (Episode 18)
- Alyy Khan as Rohan in "Chehre Pe Chehra"
- Sunil Grover as unnamed in "Vikraal Aur Zaalima Ki Khoj" (Episode 64)
- Nigaar Khan as Sarr Katika in "Vikraal Aur Soney Ka Teer" (Episode 104), Sonika in "Vikraal Aur Gabroo Ke Soney Ka Haath" (Episode 109).
- Amita Chandekar as Seema in "Jadoo" (Episode 30); Monisha in "Dosti" (Episode 43); as Bhoori Daayan in "Vikraal Aur Sarr Kata Minister Aur Bhoori Daayan" (Episode 123)
- Perizaad Zorabian as Aparna in "Ajooba" (Episode 29).
- Jaya Bhattacharya as Vastrika in "Vikraal Aur Vastrika Ke Vastra" (Episode 110); as Taantika in "Vikraal Aur Pahadi Bungla/Bungalow" (Episode 99).
- Lalit Parimoo as Jaadugar Hinnda in "Taj" (Episode 37); as Aayushmaan in "Vikraal Aur Aayushmaan Ka Darwaza" (Episode 60); as "Vikraal Aur Aayushmaan Ka Kitaab" (Episode 106).
- Sikandar Kharbanda as Jeet in "Woh Kaun Thi"; as Sameer in "Chehra" (Episode 23).
- Mazher Sayed as Abhi in "Vidyut" (Episode 1); as Ujjwal in "Captain and the Echo Cliff" (Episode 120).
- Hiten Paintal as Rohit in "Bhediya" (Episode 3).
- Tassnim Sheikh as Barfika in "Captain Aur Barfika" (Episode 145); as Jalikaa in "Bijli Aur Jalikaa" (Episode 146); as Barfika in "Vikraal Aur Jalnath" (Episode 147).
- Nidhi Seth as Nidhi / Reet / Sheetal / Gauri (5 episodes- 2007)
- Gaurav Chopra as Vineet Shakti Singh in "Jaanwar" (Episode 49)
- Amrapali Gupta as Shabana in "Meow" (Episode 48); as a witness in "Jaanwar" (Episode 49)

== Episodes ==
Series	Episodes	Originally released	
Series	Episodes	First released	Last released
1	154	27 July 2001	13 August 2004
2	221	3 November 2006	22 August 2009
3	18	19 March 2010	16 May 2010

== Accolades ==
Roy Baretto won the Indian Telly Award for Best TV Show Packaging in 2002 and 2003, while Hiroo Keswani won for Videography (Best TV Cameraman – Fiction) in 2004. Cinevistaas Limited won the Indian Telly Jury Award for Best Special/Visual Effects for television in 2002 and 2003, and Contiloe Entertainment was nominated in 2009.

Cinevistaas Limited also won the Indian Television Academy Award for Best Visual Effects in 2001, while Contiloe Entertainment won for Best Thriller / Horror Serial in 2007 and for Best Thriller Programme in 2008 and 2009.

== Spin-off ==
=== Vikraal Aur Gabraal ===
Vikraal Aur Gabraal
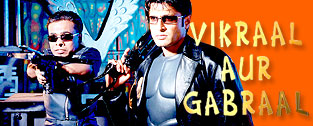
- Official poster
- Genre: Horror; Supernatural
- Created by: Prem Krishen Malhotra; Sunil Mehta (Season 1); Abhimanyyu Raj Singh; Bijesh Jayarajan
- Written by: Arshad Syed; Aditya Narain Singh; Imtiaz Baghdadi
- Directed by: Mahim Joshi
- Starring: Mamik Singh; Salil Ankola; KK Goswami; Jiten Lalwani; Neha Devi Singh
- Opening theme: Vikraal Aur Gabraal Title Track
- Country of origin: India
- Original language: Hindi
- No. of seasons: 1
- No. of episodes: 44

Production
- Executive producers: Alex Oommpm; Manisha Tripathi
- Producers: Aditya Narain Singh; Sunil Mehta; Uday Singh Phoolka; Abhimanyu Raj Singh
- Cinematography: Hiroo Keswani; Shakil B. Khan; Subhransu Das; Sandip Yadav
- Editor: Sheldon D'Souza
- Camera setup: Multi Camera
- Running time: 45 minutes
- Production companies: Cinevistaas Limited; Contiloe Entertainment

Original release
- Network: Star Plus
- Release: 27 July 2003 – 23 May 2004

A spin-off series Vikraal Aur Gabraal ran from 27 July 2003 to 23 May 2004 on Star Plus. The series centers around Vikraal, a ghost hunter teaching his apprentice "Gabroo", who is passionate and ambitious to become a ghost hunter himself going by the name of Gabraal. The spin-off series had a common plot wherein it solved the mystery and captured the ghost at the end of Ssshhhh... Koi Hai. Later, Vikraal asks Gabroo a coin to finish off the story with his action hunt by capturing the ghost of the story. Hence Gabroo learns to capture ghosts.

The series starred KK Goswami and Mamik Singh, who was replaced by Salil Ankola, Jiten Lalwani, Neha Devi Singh in later episodes, according to the storyline change and introduction of the series Ssshhhh... Koi Hai – Trikaal.
