= Mamik Singh =

Indian actor (born 1963)

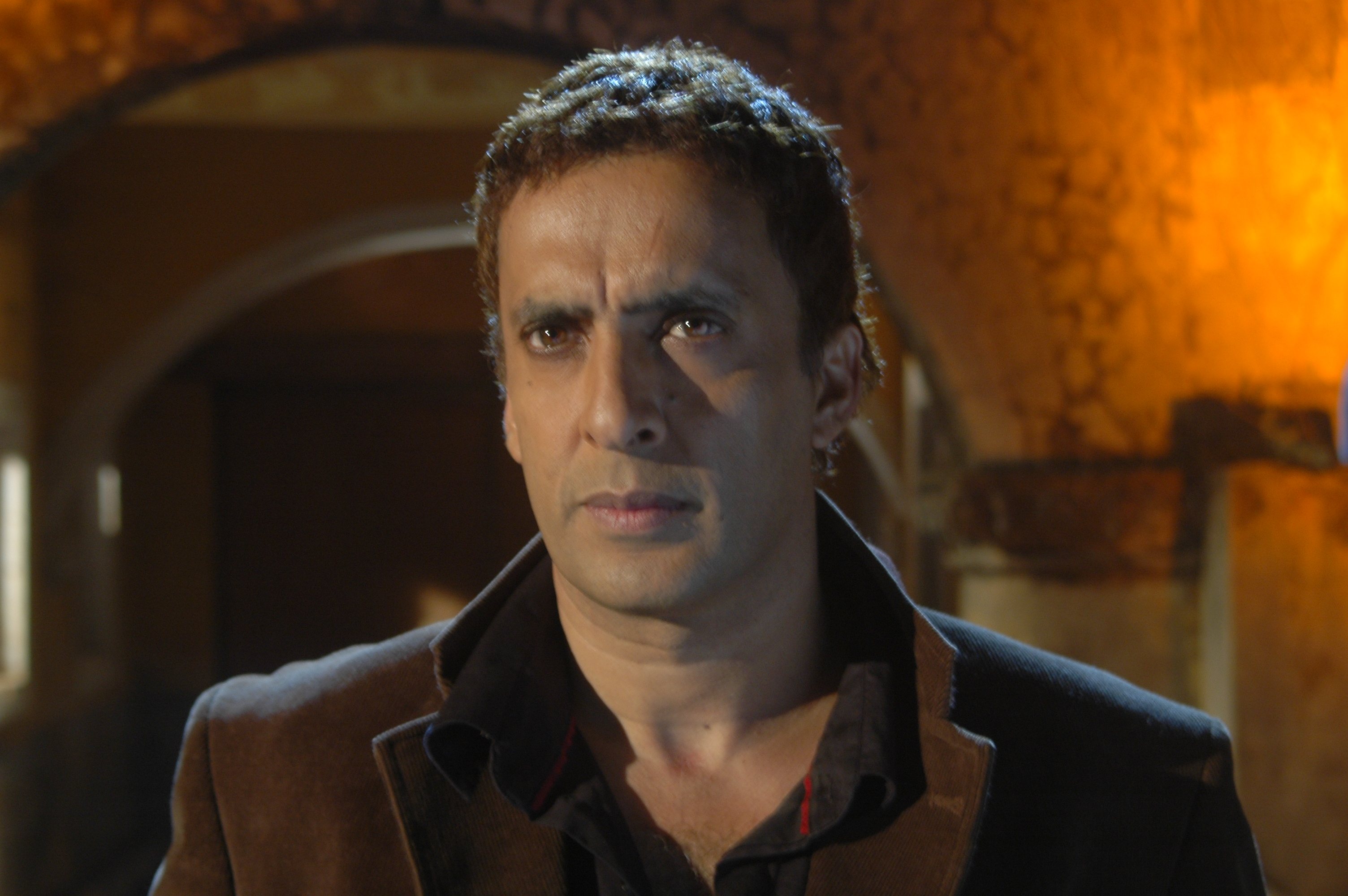
- Mamik Harmeet
- Born: Harmeet Singh Mamik; Mumbai, Maharashtra, India
- Occupation: Actor
- Years active: 1992–present
- Known for: Ssshhhh...Koi Hai
- Spouses: Sandhya Mamik (m. 1997–2008) Meenakshi Sagar (m. 2018)

Harmeet Singh Mamik popularly known as Mamik is an Indian actor, who works on television and has also worked in a few Hindi-language films. He is best known for his roles in films like Jo Jeeta Wohi Sikandar (1992), Kya Kehna (2000), and television shows like Woh (1998), Ssshhhh...Koi Hai (2002), Vikraal Aur Gabraal (2003), Black (2009), Star One Horror Nights (2010), Who's Your Daddy (Season 2) (2020).

== Early life ==
Harmeet Singh Mamik, also known as Mamik Singh, is a prominent Indian actor, who was born on 3 May 1963 in Mumbai, Maharashtra, India. After completing graduation in commerce, he joined an advertising company (an ad agency) and started his modeling career. He had ad shots for Red Bull, Kinetic, Sona Milk, and many more.

== Career ==
Mamik made his acting debut in the film, Jo Jeeta Wohi Sikandar (1992) as Aamir Khan's elder brother Ratan. He was selected by director Mansoor Khan for his role in Jo Jeeta Wohi Sikandar. Despite the film's popularity, Mamik didn't sign any assignments in films for five years finding the projects insignificant. So, he started working more on TV serials. Meanwhile, In 1997, he appeared in three more films, Aar Ya Paar, Dil Ke Jharokhe Mein, Koi Kisise Kum Nahin, along with the Kya Kehna (2000), directed by Kundan Shah. He worked in many television series like Sadma, Saahil, Maal Hai To Taal Hai, Aa Gale Lag Ja, Saturday Suspense, Champion, Chandrakanta and Woh.

In 2002, Mamik starred as Vikraal, a ghostbuster in Ssshhhh...Koi Hai which earned him accolades. The same year he was seen in Kkusum as ACP Saket Sahani. He later starred in Chandramukhi on DD1 and Black (Kaala Saaya), which aired on 9X/Sahara One. He also appeared in Kahani Chandrakanta Ki. In 2014, he entered as a party guest in the eighth season of Bigg Boss and a guest performance on Life OK's Savdhaan India. In 2015, Mamik signed Pen Movies' Do Lafzon Ki Kahani, directed by Deepak Tijori that was released in 2016. Mamik acted in Agent Raghav - Crime Branch and Jaanbaaz Sindbad in 2015, Mayavi Maling in 2016. He made his web series debut in "Rangmanch" and Scam 1992 – The Harshad Mehta Story released on SonyLiv. He did ALTBalaji ' s Who's Your Daddy (Season 2) as Mohak.

He was last seen in Ikkis with Jaideep Ahlawat.

== Filmography ==
=== Films ===
Year	Title	Role	Notes
1992	Jo Jeeta Wohi Sikandar	Ratan Lal Sharma	Debut film
1997	Aar Ya Paar	Anil	
1997	Dil Ke Jharoke Main	Prakash Rai	
1997	Koi Kisise Kum Nahin	Avinash	
2000	Kya Kehna	Vicky	
2000	Hamro Sano Ghar Hola		Nepali film
2010	Mallika	Mr. Kaushik	
2016	Do Lafzon Ki Kahani	Omi	
2021	Bell Bottom	Aashu Malhotra	
2024	Despatch	Silva	
2026	Ikkis	Pakistani General	

=== Television ===
Year	Show	Role	Notes
1993–1996	Kanoon	Dr. Satish Khanna	
1994	Champion		
1994	Sadma		
1995	Chandrakanta	Deva	
1996–1998	Yug	Arjun Singh	
1997	Saturday Suspense	Jay	Episode "Zakham"
1997	Main Aayee Chhabilee		
1997	Betaal Pachisi		
1997	Hindustani		
1998	Woh	Rahul Sahni	
1998–2003	Deewar	Arjun	
1999	Rishtey		Episode 59
2000	Star Bestsellers	Advocate Ajay Vidyarthi	Episode "Masoom"
2000	Star Bestsellers	Rohit	Episode "Ooncha Kaun"
2000	Maal Hai To Taal Hai	Vicky	
2001	Ssshhhh...Koi Hai	Tarun	Episode "Joker"
2001	Sunny	Episode "Jalwa"	
2002	Aa Gale Lag Jaa	Ritik	
2002	Love Marriage	Ravi Shah	
2002–2003	Ssshhhh...Koi Hai	Vikraal / Vijaykaal	
2003	Vikraal Aur Gabraal	Vikraal	
2004	Shaka Laka Boom Boom	Sanju / Sandros	
2004–2005	Kkusum	A.C.P. Sanket Sahni	
2006	Suno...Harr Dill Kuchh Kehtaa Hai	Sameer	
2007	Durgesh Nandini	Chunnilal Chopra	
2007–2009	Chandramukhi	Kunwar Surya Pratap Singh	
2008	Ssshhhh... Phir Koi Hai	Veer Pratap Singh	Episodes "Maa Ka Imtihaan"
2009	Black	Officer Ranvir Singh	
2010	Horror Nights	Adi Billimoria	
2011–2012	Kahani Chandrakanta Ki	Badrinath	
2011–2012	Dwarkadheesh Bhagwaan Shree Krishn	Bhishma	
2014	Savdhaan India	Naveen Neelam	Episode 611
2014	Savdhaan India	Udaybhan Singh	Episode 664
2015	Agent Raghav – Crime Branch	Magician Zorrino	
2015–2016	Janbaaz Sindbad	Arslaan	
2018	Mayavi Maling	Jaba	
2019	Savdhaan India	Senior Inspector	Episode 39
2019	ABP News – Top Stories	Imran Khan	
2020	Scam 1992 – The Harshad Mehta Story	CitiBank Chief – Mr. Rao	Episode 9
2020	Who's Your Daddy	Mohak Bagga	Season 2
