= List of Ssshhhh...Koi Hai episodes =

The following is a list of episodes from the series Ssshhhh...Koi Hai.

== Series overview ==
Series	Episodes	Originally released	
Series	Episodes	First released	Last released
1	154	27 July 2001	13 August 2004
2	221	3 November 2006	22 August 2009
3	18	19 March 2010	16 May 2010

== List of episodes ==
=== Season 1 (2001–04) ===
No. overall	No. in season	Title	Directed by	Written by	Casting	Original release date
1	1	"Jaspal's Electrical Revenge"	Glenn Baretto, Ankush Mohla	Jayesh Patil	Yashpal Sharma, Tina Parekh, Aslam Khan, Dilnaz Irani, Mazher Sayed, Kiran Dubey, Kusumit Sana	27 July 2001
A group of friends plan to capture a terrorist, Jaspal. However, his sudden demise traps his soul who is eager for revenge.
2	2	"A Haunted Filmmaker"	Mukul Abhyankar	Aditya Narain Singh	Sanjeev Vatsa, Kamia Malhotra, Munavvar Ali Khan, Alok Ulfat, Abhishek Sharma, Shaleen Singh, Vaishali Rao Khande, Ashu Goel, Minu Chopra	3 August 2001
A filmmaker visits legendary author, Ram Sen's bungalow to write his new script. However, he find himself living a real-life horror story with no exit. Story inspired by The Shining
3	3	"Wolf Hunt!"	Mukul Abhyankar	Aditya Narain Singh	Paintal, Hiten Paintal, Tom Alter, Munisha Khatwani, Aashish Kaul, Jonita Doda, P.S Bisht, Rahul	10 August 2001
A trip to Dehradun takes an unexpected turn when some kids join a hunt for man-eating wolves.
4	4	"The Tantrik's Curse"	Glenn Baretto, Ankush Mohla	Jayesh Patil	Tej Sapru, Smita Bansal, Puneet Vashist, Amit Mistry, Sushmita Daan, Mritunjay, Mukesh Jadhav	17 August 2001
A group of kids on a hunting trip, find antique relics in a cave. Things get eerie when a curse is unleashed, and an evil tantrik seeks blood sacrifices.
5	5	"The Living Doll"	Mukul Abhyankar	Aditya Narain Singh	Mamik Singh, Dolly Minhas, Nikita Bangera, Adil Jaipuri, Rajesh Kumbhargan, Gilbert Mascrenhas, Kedar, Chhotu, S.M Akhtarullah, Ashraf, Jain	24 August 2001
Nimi befriends a lovable dwarf and brings him home. Soon, her family discovers the dwarf's diabolic plan.
6	6	"A Missing Daughter"	Gaurav Pandey	Gaurav Pandey	Rajesh Khera, Mona Ambegaonkar, Anita Nagrath, Jyoti Joshi, Pradeep Patwardhan, Rashmi Sachdeva, Vimal Kumar, Geeta Nair	31 August 2001
Champa is enrolled in a new school, but refuses to leave the house. After she goes missing, her shattered mother learns a haunted truth.
7	7	"A Book of Magical Spells"	Sachin K Khot	Brijesh Jayarajan	Suneeta Sengupta, Divya Jagdale, Anupam Bhattacharya	7 September 2001
Babita acquires a book of evil spells and uses it to torture her sister Neetu.
8	8	"Back from the Dead"	Pavan S. Kaul	Imtiaaz, Arshad	Alyy Khan, Achint Kaur, Nikita Bangera, Tanaaz Irani, Rituraj Singh, Bobby Bhonsle, Dilnaz Irani, Shireen Merchant, Dev Malhotra	14 September 2001
Rakesh is puzzled when his daughter talks to an imaginary friend, unaware that a paranormal entity resides in their house.
9	9	"From Reel to Real"	Abhinav S. Kashyap	Arif	Irrfan Khan, Loveleen Mishra, Pranay Narayan, Gireesh Sahdev, Saabir Masani, Pankaj Kalra, Mukesh S. Bhatt, S.M Akhtarullah, Himmat Sharma, Poolchand, Shraddha Sharma, Mani	21 September 2001
Amar confronts his worst nightmare when the evil entities of a movie become a part of reality.
10	10	"Vengeful Ghost"	Sachin S Khot	Rajesh Ranashinge	Benika Bisht, Sahil Chaddha, Varun, Iqbal Dossani, Sunil Grover, Shamin Khan, Rajni Chandra, Raj Tolani, Seema Ponkshe, Alpana Upadhyay, Padmakar Sarap, Vinod Kapoor, Rajeev Anand, Sachin Kaul, Eshita Mehta	28 September 2001
A group of doctors run an illegal organ racket.
11	11	"Paintings From Hell"	Sourabh Narang	Aditya Narain Singh	Meghna Kothari, Joy Sengupta, Vinay Jain, Vicky Ahuja, Chittaranjan Giri, Rakesh Shrivastava	5 October 2001
Mahek is promised a huge amount of money to complete a set of paintings within a night. Soon, she discovers that her paintings are linked to inexplicable murders.
12	12	"The Haunted Bungalow"	Pramod Pradhan	Dilip Mukharia, AMit Vachharajani	Yatin Karyekar, Mayank Tandon, Savita Bajaj, Shanu Dev, Naresh Tandon, Ranu Hashia, Ayush Modi, Anit Modi, Aditya Seal, Rocky (The Dog)	12 October 2001
Vishwas brings his nephew, Hari home from boarding school. But Hari's vacation takes a sharp turn when he is being hunted for an evil occult ritual.
13	13	"Karmic Killings"	Kaushik Ghatak	Aditya Narain Singh	Yusuf Shaikh, Gaurav Gera, Kunal Kumar, Shruti Seth, Shabanam Kapoor, Ruhil, Vedita Pratap Singh, Ramesh Goyal	19 October 2001
A prank turns deadly for a gang of college students when they accidentally kill a child. Story inspired by I Know What You Did Last Summer
14	14	"Paranormal Activities in a Fort"	Pavan S Kaul	Sameer Modi	Sonia Kapoor, Neha Dhupia, Namrata Thapa, Anil George, Sikandar Kharbanda, Shiva Rindani, Suresh, Shaleen Singh, Harmeet Singh	26 October 2001
A holiday trip to a fort in Rajasthan quickly turns deadly for a gang of friends.
15	15	"The Mummy Awakens"	Pavan S Kaul	Arshad Syed, Imtiyaz Baghdadi	Rajat Gowda, Paintal, Karishma Modi, Manmeet Gulzar, Monty, Shaleen Singh	2 November 2001
A group of explorers finds a mysterious tomb while searching for a hidden treasure.
16	16	"Vampires at Jalwa Bar"	Pavan S Kaul	Arshad Syed, Imtiyaz Baghdadi	Mamik Singh, Vikram Sahu, Ronit Roy, Mahendra Shera, Brinda Parekh, Abhay Bhargav, Master Adil Jaipuri	9 November 2001
Strange incidents occur at the cursed Jalwa bar.
17	17	"Nightmare Factory"	Pavan S Kaul	Haron Rushid	Parmeet Sethi, Kamya Punjabi, Niki Gupta, Hrishikesh Pandey, Vikram Sahu, Gautam Saugat, Lipika, Banwarilal Jhol	16 November 2001
A thrilling game turns too real for Rahul after he gets trapped by an evil spirit.
18	18	"Doosri Dulhan"	Pavan S Kaul	Arshad Syed, Imtiyaz Baghdadi	Chetan Hansraj, Sameeta, Rakesh Thadeja, Vishal Kotian, Shiv, Namrata Thapa, Anil George	23 November 2001
A few TV reporters almost become news when they visit a deserted mansion on a hill.
19	19	"Danger Behind the Cameras"	Kaushik Ghatak	Sameer Gupta	Nikita Thukral, Gufi Paintal, Jignesh Joshi, Vaishali Saini, Ashish Sharma, Rajeev Paul, Vidhya Dhar	30 November 2001
A horror video shoot at an abandoned house turns uneventful when a group of friends finds more than just a good location.
20	20	"Aayi Bala Ko Taal Tuu"	Kaushik Ghatak	Bijesh Jairajan	Ikhlat Khan, Neelu Kohli, Pawan Singh, Manish Kapoor, Rohit Goel, Suraj Chauhan, Dharam Veer, Param Wadhwa, Hayat Asif, Alpama Upadhyay, Child Artists – Yogin Soni, Aditya Seal, Rahul Joshi, Shweta Prasad, Charmy Desai	7 December 2001
A family moves into a new neighbourhood, but their kids soon learn of a dark presence.
21	21	"Jungle"	Suraj Rao	Jayesh Patil	Shawar Ali, Rushad Rana, Imran Mashkoor Khan, Vikram Acharya, Chandana Sharma, Pamela Mukherjee, Kaliprasad Mukherjee, Nitesh Bhardhwaj, Mrs. Bharti M. Shah	14 December 2001
The forests of Asurgarh hold many secrets, the group of friends visiting find out the hard way after a paranormal entity haunts them.
22	22	"A Scary Scarecrow"	Pavan S Kaul	Arshad Syed, Imtiyaz Baghdadi	Mac Mohan, Prithvi Zutshi, Savita Bajaj, Rahil Azam, Chitra Pamma, Monica Kale, Gufraan, Yogesh, Rajesh Dubey	28 December 2001
On the way home for Christmas, Suzy and her friends unleash a 15-year-old curse.
23	23	"The Mask of Evil"	Khazan Panesar	Jayesh Patil	Nilanjana Sharma, Devansh Doshi, Siraj Mustafa Khan, Sikandar Kharbanda, Munisha Khatwani, Nitin Arora, Mandeep Bhandar, Hayat Asif, Anita Nagrath	4 January 2002
Prankster Sanju takes a prank too far and ends up killing himself.
24	24	"The Dark Phantom"	Kaushik Ghatak	Sanjeev Gandhi	Rahul Nanda, Kuldeep Ruhil, Mehul Nisar, Niji Chhabra, Sonal Chainani, Ashwin Kaushal, Anup Patel, Master Varun Punjabi, Lipika	11 January 2002
Unaware of the deadly repercussions, Ninaad and his friends visit the haunted Kala Ghoda chowk.
25	25	"A Mysterious Chiraag"	Suraj Rao	Sameer Modi	Shiva Rindani, Poonam Joshi, Meghna Khanna, Mohit Chaddha, Zafar Karachiwala, Utpal Nandi, Anuja, Sparsh Agrawat	18 January 2002
Natasha brings an ancient chiraag home from the museum.
26	26	"Roxanne, the Killer Car"	Pavan S Kaul	Arshad Syed, Imtiyaz Baghdadi	Ronit Roy, Shruti Seth, Shafi Wasan, Firoz Khan, Sunil, Domnic, Gufraan, Kirk Peter, Govind Agarwal	25 January 2002
Infatuated by Freddy, the owner's son, a car goes on a killing spree for love and betrayal.
27	27	"The Headless General"	S. Subramaniam	Arshad Syed, Imtiyaz Baghdadi	Virendra Saxena, Bob Christo, Zakir Hussain, Sitaram Panchal, Sonia Rakkar, Nilofer, Chandrakant V, Adil Jaipuri, Sanjay Soni, Akhtar, Lalan, Javed Yaveri, Deeraj Singh, Rajesh Druv	1 February 2002
General Dennis, a headless entity who haunts the jail, looking for his head.
28	28	"Curse of the Burial Ground"	Pavan S Kaul	Arshad Syed, Imtiyaz Baghdadi	Chetan Hansraj, Geetanjali Minhas, Deepti Daryanani, Sachin Kaul, Tarakesh Chauhan, Brownie Parashar, Mira Savoor, Rahil Azam	8 February 2002
Michael and his family buy a new house only to learn about its horrifying past.
29	29	"Frankenstein Joseph"	Sourabh Usha Narang	Arshad Syed, Imtiyaz Baghdadi	Perizaad Zorabian, Gurinder Makna, Ashish Kapoor, Dadhey Pandey, Paritosh Sand, Pankaj Jha, Sameena, Chunnu Mehra, KK Goswami, Shakti Singh, Aakansha	15 February 2002
A mad scientist brings the dead back to life, but ends up being a victim.
30	30	"Rebirth of a Daayan"	Raju	Sanjeev Gandhi	Sadiya Siddiqui, Neha Pendse, Amita Chandekar, Monika Kale, Mini Tiwari, Shreya, Savita Bajaj, Bhisham, Baljeet, Gufran, Hassan, Kashyap Modi, Kali Prasad	22 February 2002
A group of young girls activates their powers from their previous birth as a Daayan.
31	31	"Island of the Maneater"	Pavan S Kaul	Arshad Syed, Imtiyaz Baghdadi	Himani Shivpuri, Vishal Puri, Shabnam Sayed, Kaveeta Oberoi Kaul, Kuljeet Randhawa, Rajeev Anand, Shaukat Baig, Nirmal Bhavnani, Sunil, Domnique	1 March 2002
Unaware of Maya's Maneater, tourists visit her place only to never be seen again.
32	32	"Dr. Karan or Mr. Kapali?"	Pavan S Kaul	Arshad Syed, Imtiyaz Baghdadi	Alyy Khan, Nisha Lalwani, Rohit Chopra, Dadhi Pandey, Amrapali Gupta, Jayant Pandit, Sanjay Soni, Akashdeep Goel, Ajay Tiwari	8 March 2002
Curiosity makes Professor Karan become something worse than the devil.
33	33	"A Game of Skulls"	Suraj Rao	Arshad, Imtiyaz	Deepshikha Nagpal, Deepak Jethi, Puneet Vashist, Khyati Khandke Keswani, Ragesh Asthana, Pawan Kumar, Domnique Alvares	15 March 2002
A Nagini in the form of a woman preys on men at a bar.
34	34	"Ek Shaitani Raat"	Pavan S Kaul	Arshad, Imtiyaz	Karanvir Bohra, Vijay Kashyap, Rupa Divetia, Poonam Daryanani, Sanjay Pandey, Saahil Gill, Gulshan, Keerti Kapoor, Moinuddin, Dharam Soni, Rakesh Tripathi, Naresh Sharma, Anil George, Asad Khan, Akil, Guffran, Akash Salgotra	22 March 2002
Paranormal events instigate two boys to investigate their neighbour's house.
35	35	"The Sea of Spirits"	Pavan S Kaul	Arshad, Imtiyaz	Chetan Hansraj, Rahil Azam, Deepak Bhatia, Gufraan, Sachin Kaul, Rajat Gawda, Sairin, Shaukat Baig, Domnique, Vikram, Sunil	29 March 2002
A sea adventure goes wrong for a group of fishermen and a couple when they hear screams in the middle of the sea.
36	36	"Leela Laal Rang Ki"	Suraj Rao	Sameer Modi	Sharokh Barucha, Kamya Punjabi, Girish Jain, Kuldeep Singh Ruhil, Keerti Gaekwad Kelkar, Banwarilal Jhol, Vikas Anand, Vijay Bedi	5 April 2002
Mitesh, a daring youngster gets a run for his money when his prank evokes the spirit of a murdered soul.
37	37	"Fashion Fiasco"	Bobby Macy	Iqbal Rizvi	Lalit Parimoo, Kanchan Mirchandani, Aswhin Dhar, Shilpa Tiku, Dilnaz Irani, Monica Kale, Shivani Gosain, Mamta Soni, Anup Patel, Charan Singh	12 April 2002
100 years ago, an evil worshipper was held captive in a rudra mala as penance.
38	38	"Cinematic Horror"	S. Subramanin	Arshad, Imtiyaz	Shaukat Baig, Firdaus Mevawala, Vikram Acharya, Mehul Nisar, Nivedita Kanjur, Payal Nair, Vijay Bhatia, Anil Saxena, Abner Reginald, Neeraj Sood, Shekhar Yadav, Gurvinder Makhna, Rajesh Druv, Sanjay Soni, Dheeraj Singh, Balvir, Feroz, Sunita	19 April 2002
Ratanlal's theatre releases a horror movie after five years, thus unleashing the spirit within its compound.
39	39	"The Hitman Ghost"	Suraj Rao	Sanjeev Gandhi	Hrishikesh Pandey, Gavin Packard, Ravee Gupta, Rushad Rana, Jennifer, Ashwin Kaushal, Rohit Raj, Vijay Bedi, Mamta Thakur, Avdesh, Dinesh, Arjun Singh, Vinod Kumar, Mandeep Bhandar	26 April 2002
Four individuals are targeted by a ghost, conjured specifically to kill them.
40	40	"The Haunted Village"	Pavan S Kaul	Rajeev Aggarwal	Shehzad Khan, Simran Jadhwani/Aarti Oberoi, Nidhi Parmar, Zuber, Rajiv, Vindu Dara Singh (cameo), Kishori Ambiye, Krishna Bansal, Brijesh Chaddha, Paras Chaurasia, Sumagat Agrawal, Ajay Bali, Raju Dilliwala, Neha Gupta, Umang, Tina	3 May 2002
On their way to a friend's marriage, a group of friends detours into a remote haunted village.
41	41	"Haunted House Contest"	Suraj Rao	Sameer Modi, Faisal, Manikya Raju Uppaluri	Supriya Karnik, Hitesh Kriplani, Gaurav Gera, Poonam Joshi, Rupali Mehta, Nancy, Amit Dhawan, Iqbal Dossan, Anju Rajiv, Ritu Walia	10 May 2002
A game of death masked as a horror show traps innocent people.
42	42	"Highway"	Kaushik Ghatak	Arshad Syed	Paras Chaurasia, Vindu Dara Singh, Malini Kapoor, Pallavi Dutt	17 May 2002
A group of friends encounters supernatural events while traveling on a deserted highway.
43	43	"Revenge from the Bullies"	Mahim Joshi	Bijesh Jayarajan	Mitra Joshi, Rajeev Kumar, Howard Rosemeyer, Gaurav Chanana, Amita Chandekar, Barkha Madan, Hitesh Kriplani, Raj Khanna, Sanjogita	24 May 2002
A group of friends have to pay for their sins when the junior they used to rag returns from the grave for revenge.
44	44	"A Wicked Demon"	Raju	Rajgaru	Vindu Dara Singh, Gufi Paintal, Benika Deepak, Yash Shah, Jyoti Mukerje, Pawan Kumar, Shreya, Aanchal, Anushka, Vandana, Goolshan, Kavi Kumar Azad, Akarsh	31 May 2002
Desperate for revenge, Sangram Singh seeks the help of an aghori to execute his plan against the royal household.
45	45	"Don't Break the Rules"	Gul Khan	Mohit Hussien	Anju Mahendru, Narayani Shastri, Kishwar Merchant, Sheetal Thakkar, Kanika Kohli, Raj Kaushal, Kaali Prasad, Govind, Nitu, Parul Kumar, Amarapali, Anjum	14 June 2002
The spirit of a warden, who was sentenced to death, haunts the hostel and kills indisciplined girls.
46	46	"Jinnat Ka Kahar"	S. Subramaniam	Arshad Syed, Imtiyaz Baghdadi	Pradeep Rawat, Yusuf Hussain, Ramesh Goyal, Tej Sapru, Sajid Khan, Imran Mashkoor Khan, Sachin Ahuja, Mishti Verma, Savita Bajaj, Ahmed Khan, Asha Sharma, Ramesh Bansal, Muzaffar Khan, Priyeta, Manish Upadhyay	21 June 2002
A Qazi accidentally kills a Jinnat.
47	47	"A Picnic Gone Wrong"	Vivek Agnihotri	Ramnesh Puri	Murali Sharma, Maleeka Ghai, Tanushree Kaushal, Monica Kale, Kanika Kohli, Naveen Bawa, Sraddha, Nikita, Firoze	28 June 2002
A group of girls plans a picnic in a forest. Little did they know that the place is haunted and an evil tantrik is on the prowl.
48	48	"A Killer Cat"	Suraj Rao	Rajeev Aggarwal	Suvarna Jha, Ronit Roy, Shakti Singh, Amrapali Gupta, Pratap Sachdev, Aarti Puri, Pinki Jhoorani	5 July 2002
A newborn child is believed to be a curse by her family. She starts developing cat-like prowess, revealing that she was a cat in her previous birth, and that she's living her ninth life as a human. If she tastes the blood of a human, then she will be a man-eater, leaving the family concerned but devastated.
49	49	"A Deadly Dog"	Bobby Macy	Iqbal Rizvi	Gaurav Chopra, Vikram Sahu, Sandeep Rajora, Menaka Lalawani	12 July 2002
A basketball player goes insane after he loses a match.
50	50	"Meet Vikraal - the Savior"	Pavan S Kaul	Arshad Syed, Imtiyaz Baghdadi	Mamik Singh, KK Goswami, Shonali Malhotra, Shahbaz Khan, Rajesh Puri, Gagan Gupta, Paresh Shah, Sanjeev Talpade, Iliyas Sheikh, Sunil Chauhan	19 July 2002
While Vikraal, Gabru and Lily save people from evil spirits, while Chow Yoon Thin seeks Vikram's help to find the Satrangi Bhala.
51	51	"Vikraal Battles the Demon Riddler"	Pavan S Kaul	Arshad Syed, Imtiyaz Baghdadi	Mamik Singh, KK Goswami, Shonali Malhotra, Deepak Bhatia, Vikas Anand, Rajesh Bachchani, Vishal Sabnani, R Ketki, Akshay Verma, Govind Agarwal	26 July 2002
Vikraal sets out on a mission to save his teacher's son while Gabru stalks him.
52	52	"Vikraal, the Time Traveller"	Pavan S Kaul	Arshad Syed, Imtiyaz Baghdadi	Mamik Singh, KK Goswami, Shonali Malhotra, Tarakesh Chauhan, Chhotu Ustaad, Jai, Piyush	2 August 2002
Zimbo Maharaj's tyranny forces Vikraal's village into hiding when he comes back looking for them.
53	53	"Vikraal Faces Kali Daayan"	Pavan S Kaul	Arshad Syed, Imtiyaz Baghdadi	Mamik Singh, KK Goswami, Shonali Malhotra, Vishnu Sharma, Savita Bajaj, Anup Patel, Devansh Doshi, Ashwini Khemani, Nirmal Bhagnani, Sanjay Sugaonkar, Hanuman, Pradeep Gupta, Sundar Chhabra, Lipika	9 August 2002
A village is terrorised by Kali Daayan while Vikraal finds a way to defeat her.
54	54	"The Weeping Portrait"	Pavan S Kaul	Arshad Syed, Imtiyaz Baghdadi	Mamik Singh, KK Goswami, Shonali Malhotra, MacMohan, Vikas Anand, Ramesh Goyal, Chhotu Ustaad	16 August 2002
The royal family of Pratapgarh is haunted by a crying portrait in their palace, every amavasya.
55	55	"Pretal's Creepy Bracelet"	Pavan S Kaul	Arshad Syed, Imtiyaz Baghdadi	Mamik Singh, KK Goswami, Shonali Malhotra, Pradeep Rawat, Anokhi Anand, Shano Hanspal, Ananjay, Divya Diya, Monali, Subodh Manath	23 August 2002
With the nation in turmoil, the Home Minister seeks help from Vikraal to stop a creepy bracelet created by Pretal, from spreading havoc.
56	56	"Bad Teacher"	Pavan S Kaul	Arshad Syed, Imtiyaz Baghdadi	Mamik Singh, KK Goswami, Shonali Malhotra, Vishnu Sharma, Vijay Kashyap, Rushad Rana, Ajit Vachani, Renuka Aegade, Manaswi Mistry, Varun Kumar, Sheelu Sheikh, Gurjeet Singh, Jennifer, S.K Abbas, Mithun, Nancy	30 August 2002
Fuelled by vengeance, the spirit of a college professor takes the lives of students.
57	57	"The Poisonous Sweets"	Vivek Agnihotri	Arshad Syed, Imtiyaz Baghdadi	Mamik Singh, KK Goswami, Shonali Malhotra, Mukesh Ahuja, Amrapali Gupta, Vikram Sahu, Gautam Saugat, Ashu Sharma, Charmi Desai, Pradeep Patwardhan, Monish, Khushboo, Renuka, Neelam, Swapnali	6 September 2002
A marriage celebration turns into a crime scene when the sweet maker uses his treats as a trap for the guests.
58	58	"The Vampire Resort"	Pavan S Kaul	Arshad Syed, Imtiyaz Baghdadi	Mamik Singh, KK Goswami, Shonali Malhotra, Benika Deepak, Ajay Nagrath, Gulshan, Poonam Daryanani, Bunny Atal, Zenia Chopra, Happy, S. K. Abbas, Gagan Gupta, Manoj Ochani, Anil George, Dharam Veer	13 September 2002
A resort is overrun by vampires preying on the innocent.
59	59	"Binu Ki Baasuri"	Rajesh P Ranashinge	Arshad Syed, Imtiyaz Baghdadi	Mamik Singh, KK Goswami, Shonali Malhotra, Chetan Hansraj, Brownie Parashar, Sai Balal, Sitaram Panchal, Deepak Sagani	20 September 2002
Tarkanath seeks Binu's help to save the city from a weird species of bats, unaware about his dark side.
60	60	"Abhimanyu Seeks Immortality"	Pavan S Kaul	Arshad Syed, Imtiyaz Baghdadi	Mamik Singh, KK Goswami, Shonali Malhotra, Lalit Parimoo, Sachin Kaul, Fatima Sana Shaikh, Aditya Singh Rajput, Harshal Gaglani, Sakshi Sen, Sonu Sheikh, Menaka Lalwani, Vinita Sampat, Sophiya Punne, Dhananjay Singh, Vivek Chaudhary, S.K. Abbas	27 September 2002
Abhimanyu preys on innocent people to stay immortal.
61	61	"The Ghost of a Serial Killer"	Khazan	Arshad Syed, Imtiyaz Baghdadi	Mamik Singh, KK Goswami, Shonali Malhotra, Ketki Dave, Gurinder Makna, Hitesh Kriplani, Nikki, Aarti, Sudarshan, Harry, Harsha	11 October 2002
Mangla, Lily's aunt, accidentally brings the spirit of a serial killer back to life.
62	62	"Vikraal's Deadly Jungle Mission"	Rajesh P.Ranashinge	Arshad Syed, Imtiyaz Baghdadi	Mamik Singh, KK Goswami, Shonali Malhotra, Ratan Bose, Tanaz Irani, Gauri Shankar, Anna, Rupka	18 October 2002
In his quest to help the police, Vikraal sets out into a dangerous jungle with Lily and Gabru to retrieve a powerful fruit.
63	63	"Return of Mayakaal"	Rajesh P.Ranashinge	Arshad Syed, Imtiyaz Baghdadi	Mamik Singh, KK Goswami, Shonali Malhotra, Vindu Dara Singh, Vicky Ahuja, Rajiv Mishra, Vishnu Sharma, Qasim Ali, Hanuman	25 October 2002
Two miners find a broken sculpture and begin to assemble it, unaware that their seemingly futile actions have paved the way for Mayakaal's return.
64	64	"Zaal Searches for Zalima"	Rajesh P Ranashinge	Arshad Syed, Imtiyaz Baghdadi	Mamik Singh, KK Goswami, Shonali Malhotra, Vindu Dara Singh, Shakti Anand, Vishnu Sharma, Mukesh Jadhav, Sunil Grover, Anup Upadhyay, Juma P. Mitra	1 November 2002
In order to resurrect Zalima, Zaal enters the forest of Kotiyam.
65	65	"Mayakaal Invigorates Zalima"	Rajesh P Ranashinge	Arshad Syed, Imtiyaz Baghdadi	Mamik Singh, KK Goswami, Shonali Malhotra, Vishnu Sharma, Vindu Dara Singh, Deepshikha Nagpal, Shakti Anand, Deepak Jethi	8 November 2002
Mayakaal invigorates Zalima, who plans to reunite with Zaal to become immortal.
66	66	"Vikraal Wants Justice"	Prasad Raju	Arshad Syed, Imtiyaz Baghdadi	Mamik Singh, KK Goswami, Shakti Anand, Shahbaz Khan, Deepak Jethi, Vishnu Sharma	15 November 2002
Vikraal learns that Mayakaal was the evil entity that killed his family.
67	67	"Vikraal Is Tested"	Sachin Kamlakar Khot	Arshad Syed, Imtiyaz Baghdadi	Mamik Singh, KK Goswami, Shakti Anand, Shahbaz Khan, Vishnu Sharma, Gagan Gupta, Kavita Kaushik, Varun Punjabi, S. Shyam Singh	22 November 2002
Vikraal seeks Mrityunjay's help to destroy Mayakaal.
68	68	"A Wizard Horse"	Sachin Kamlakar Khot	Arshad Syed, Imtiyaz Baghdadi	Mamik Singh, KK Goswami, Shahbaz Khan, Vishnu Sharma, Shakti Anand, Kanchan Mirchandani, Bhavna	29 November 2002
To save his Guruji, Vikraal decides to find a magical horse with a horn.
69	69	"All Hail Queen Lily"	Rajesh P Ranashinge	Arshad Syed, Imtiyaz Baghdadi	Mamik Singh, KK Goswami, Shonali Malhotra, Shahbaz Khan, Qasim Ali, Ramesh Tiwari, Mamta, Vijay, Samsuddin, Bhupinder	6 December 2002
Lily is hypnotised to become a sacrifice while Vikraal and Gabru get captured.
70	70	"A Diabolical Robot"	Sachin Kamlakar Khot	Arshad Syed, Imtiyaz Baghdadi	Mamik Singh, KK Goswami, Shonali Malhotra, Shahbaz Khan, Gufi Paintal, Vishnu Sharma, Qasim Ali	13 December 2002
A malicious scientist decides to help Mayakaal and hands over a secret map.
71	71	"Gabru Takes Coaching Classes"	Rajesh P Ranashinge	Arshad Syed, Imtiyaz Baghdadi	Mamik Singh, KK Goswami, Shonali Malhotra, Shahbaz Khan, Gufi Paintal, Vishnu Sharma, Qasim Ali, Usha Bachani	20 December 2002
Vikraal seeks Mrityunjay's help to unravel the mystery of the four skulls.
72	72	"Vikraal vs Mayakaal"	Rajesh P Ranashinge	Arshad Syed, Imtiyaz Baghdadi	Mamik Singh, KK Goswami, Shonali Malhotra, Shahbaz Khan, Vishnu Sharma, Gufi Paintal, Shakti Anand, Kanchan Mirchandani, Mukesh Jadhav, Qasim Ali	27 December 2002
Vikraal faces the dreaded Mayakaal and lands in the forest of dacoits.
73	73	"Vikraal Enters the Mysterious Cave"	Rajesh P Ranashinge	Arshad Syed, Imtiyaz Baghdadi	Mamik Singh, KK Goswami, Shahbaz Khan, Gufi Paintal, Vishnu Sharma	3 January 2003
Mayakaal traps Guru with the help of an evil demoness while Vikraal enters a booby-trapped cave to retrieve the diamond skull.
74	74	"Vikraal and the Deadly Virus"	Sachin Kamlakar Khot	Arshad Syed, Imtiyaz Baghdadi	Mamik Singh, KK Goswami, Sonali Malhotra, Shahbaz Khan, Gufi Paintal, Monika Seth, Iqbal Dassani, Hiren Thakkar, Addite Shirwaikar Malik	10 January 2003
Using a computer virus, Zarco tracks the location of Vikraal's headquarters.
75	75	"The Land of Dwarfs"	Prasad Raju	Arshad Syed, Imtiyaz Baghdadi	Mamik Singh, KK Goswami, Shonali Malhotra, Shahbaz Khan, Gufi Paintal, Vishnu Sharma, Kamya Punjabi, Nawab Shah, Anwar Khan, Shishir Sharma, Harsha Thakur, Shaleen	17 January 2003
Out for a walk on the beach, Vikraal and the gang unknowingly stumble upon the land of dwarfs.
76	76	"Vikraal Battles Drokal"	Prasad Raju	Arshad Syed, Imtiyaz Baghdadi	Mamik Singh, KK Goswami, Shonali Malhotra, Shahbaz Khan, Gufi Paintal, Nawab Shah, Mukesh Jadhav, Tom Alter, Deepak Chauhan, Shaleen	24 January 2003
Vikraal saves a bus from being looted by a gang of dacoits.
77	77	"The Spooky Graveyard"	Prasad Raju	Arshad Syed, Imtiyaz Baghdadi	Mamik Singh, KK Goswami, Shonali Malhotra, Shahbaz Khan, Gufi Paintal, Nawab Shah, Shaleen, Dadhi Pandey	31 January 2003
Vikraal is tricked into carrying a magical rock by a strange man at the graveyard.
78	78	"Vikral, Dhrokal on a Mission"	Rajesh P Ranashinge	Arshad Syed, Imtiyaz Baghdadi	Mamik Singh, KK Goswami, Shonali Malhotra, Shahbaz Khan, Gufi Paintal, Shakti Anand, Tanaaz Irani, Nawab Shah, Monalika Bhonshle, Vishnu Sharma, Dadhi Pandey, Shaleen, Kishori Shahane	7 February 2003
Vikral and Dhrokal are on a mission to capture an evil creature named Gullak.
79	79	"Vikraal vs Gori Daayan"	Rajesh P Ranashinge	Arshad Syed, Imtiyaz Baghdadi	Mamik Singh, KK Goswami, Shonali Malhotra, Shahbaz Khan, Gufi Paintal, Shakti Anand, Nawab Shah, Dadhi Pandey, Gauri Shankar, Smriti Shrivastava, Kishori Shahane	14 February 2003
Gabru and Lily are trapped in Gori daayan's house while Vikraal struggles to find them.
80	80	"Vikraal Battles Mayakaal"	Rajesh P Ranashinge	Arshad Syed, Imtiyaz Baghdadi	Mamik Singh, KK Goswami, Shonali Malhotra, Shahbaz Khan, Gufi Paintal, Nawab Shah, Vishnu Sharma, Gauri Shankar	21 February 2003
Vikraal undergoes some wild adventures, preparing for his battle with Mayakaal.
81	81	"Chameleon Man on the Prowl"	Mahim Joshi	Arshad Syed, Imtiyaz Baghdadi	Mamik Singh, KK Goswami, Shonali Malhotra, Shakti Anand, Nawab Shah, Shiva Rindani, Mukesh Jadhav, Shabir, Parinita Seth, Gaurav Dixit	28 February 2003
A group of children go missing after eating fruits from a mysterious tree.
82	82	"The Museum of Evil"	Rajesh P Ranashinge	Arshad Syed	Mamik Singh, KK Goswami, Shonali Malhotra, Nawab Shah, Tanaaz Irani, Sagarika Soni, Moin Khan, Bunny Atal, Sanjeev Darshan, Monaz, Benjamin	7 March 2003
An evil spirit who captures a group of children will only give them up if Vikraal gets a magical coat.
83	83	"Vikraal Fights Betaal"	Rajesh P Ranashinge	Arshad Syed	Mamik Singh, KK Goswami, Shonali Malhotra, Nawab Shah, Vishnu Sharma, Sunaina Gulia, Deepak Jethi, Shiva Rindani, Zoya, Samraat, Rahul	14 March 2003
Betaal lays siege to a village by kidnapping their children, only to get Vikraal's attention.
84	84	"A Magical Portrait"	Sachin Kamlakar Khot	Arshad Syed	Mamik Singh, KK Goswami, Nawab Shah, Sunaina Gulia, Shiva Rindani, Karishma Mehta, Zoya, Damini, Samraat, Dadhi Pandey	21 March 2003
In an attempt to free the kids, Vikraal loses the magical coat.
85	85	"The Witchy Cat"	Rajesh P Ranashinge	Arshad Syed	Mamik Singh, KK Goswami, Nawab Shah, Dadhi Pandey, Sunaina Gulia, Ravee Gupta, Namrata Thapa, Aditya Singh Rajput, Karishma Mehta, Damini	28 March 2003
Drokaal attacks Vikraal while the latter finds a vital clue to rescue the girls.
86	86	"The Dreaded Dracula"	Rajesh P Ranashinge	Arshad Syed	Mamik Singh, KK Goswami, Shonali Malhotra, Chetan Hansraj, Ravee Gupta, Kishwar Merchant, Mukesh Jadhav, Sunil Mattoo	4 April 2003
Kateena tells Vikraal that the brush of Alcasom belongs to Dracula.
87	87	"Vikraal Loses His Memory"	Suraj Rao	Arshad Syed	Mamik Singh, KK Goswami, Shonali Malhotra, Chetan Hansraj, Nawab Shah, Mukesh Jadhav, Sunil Mattoo, Kunika, Prachi Mehta	11 April 2003
Vikraal and Gabru play a deadly game to acquire the brush of Alcasom.
88	88	"Vikraal to Kill Dracula"	Suraj Rao	Arshad Syed	Mamik Singh, KK Goswami, Shonali Malhotra, Chetan Hansraj, Nawab Shah, Mukesh Jadhav, Vinod Singh, Shalini Khanna, Kunika Vishnu Sharma, Deepak	18 April 2003
Vikraal and Gabru free the girls trapped in the photograph.
89	89	"Contacting the Demon"	Manish R.Khandelwal	Arshad Syed	Mamik Singh, KK Goswami, Shonali Malhotra, Mohan Kapoor, Mehul Nisar, Kamya Punjabi, Vinita Thakur, Aparna Tarakad, Umesh Pherwani, Kamal Malik, Shweta Kochar, Sanjeev Siddhart, Tom Alter	25 April 2003
A group of friends finds an ouija board inside a mysterious box.
90	90	"Zoravar Traps Vikraal"	Manish R.Khandelwal	Arshad Syed	Mamik Singh, KK Goswami, Shonali Malhotra, Sunaina Gulia, Tom Alter, Kamya Punjabi, Rajesh Singh, Mehul Nisar, Vinita Thakur, Divya Sharma, Ajay Verma, Rahul Kheterpal, Shashi Mishra	2 May 2003
A lunatic doctor plans an experiment by doing the unthinkable.
91	91	"The Time Machine"	Manish R.Khandelwal	Arshad Syed	Mamik Singh, KK Goswami, Sunaina Gulia, Manini Mishra, Tom Alter, Rajesh Singh, Vinita Thakur, Kamya Punjabi, Mehul Nisar, Umesh Pherwani, Nikhil Khera, Jolly Walker, Aparna Tarakad, Preeta	9 May 2003
Vikraal decides to go back in time to save a few kids.
92	92	"The Haunted Jungle"	Rajesh P Ranashinge	Arshad Syed	Mamik Singh, KK Goswami, Manav Gohil, Mukesh Jadhav, Kishori Shahane, Hitesh Kriplani, Aditi Pratap, Ankur Javeri, Sanjay Swaraj, Meenakshi, Gagan, Gulistan, Chesan	16 May 2003
A group of students visits the forest for their camp, unaware of a deadly entity that haunts the land.
93	93	"The Mansion of Lies"	Niranjan Thare	Samir Modi	Mamik Singh, KK Goswami, Shonali Malhotra, Abhimanyu Singh, Sheetal Thakkar, Aparna Bhatnagar, Yogesh Pathak, Vijay Kumar, Veidehi	23 May 2003
A spirit in the mansion torments the owner beyond her breaking point.
94	94	"The Tale of Alkatzar City"	Guroudev Bhalla	Arshad Syed	Mamik Singh, KK Goswami, Ritu Chaudhary, Pracheen Chauhan, Deepak Bhatia, Pratap Sachdev, Manmeet Singh, Nishi Singh, Zeenat D'Souza, Shefali Rana, Javed Rizvi, Saved Sharique	30 May 2003
The excavation of the city of Alkatzar unearths a demon ruler, Zakar, who plans to revive himself.
95	95	"The Search for a Lost Thesis"	Mahim Joshi	Arshad Syed	Mamik Singh, KK Goswami, Shonali Malhotra, Manoj Bidwai, Kuldeep Ruhil, Poonam Daryanani, Kanika Kohli,	6 June 2003
In search of his uncle's lost thesis, Atin and his teenage friends embark on a mission to recover it, but find themselves hunted by an evil entity, one by one.
96	96	"Captain Kishan to the Rescue"	Santrum Verma	Arshad Syed	Manav Gohil, Tarana Raja, Mukesh Jadhav, Rashid Khan, Suhita Thatte, Sanjeev Siddhart, Ashiwini Kumar, Govind	13 June 2003
Kareena seeks Captain Kishan's help to save her brother from the Kavacha tribe.
97	97	"An Evil Sorceress"	Rajesh P Ranashinge	Ramneesh Puri	Mamik Singh, KK Goswami, Sunaina Gulia, Neha Pendse, Girish Jain, Malini Kapoor, Samrat Kapoor, Rufi Sharma	20 June 2003
Human intervention awakens an ancient evil magician who was locked up for years.
98	98	"Satanic Wishing Well"	Prasad Gavandi	Arshad Syed	Mamik Singh, KK Goswami, Sunaina Gulia, Raj Logani, Jay Pathak, Neha Bam, Vaishali Saini, Shano Hanspal, Muskaan, Rashid Jaan, Rajeev Raj, Uttam Bairagi	27 June 2003
A wishing well grants the wishes of the people, but with a deadly touch.
99	99	"Death Bungalow"	Gurudev Bhalla	Arshad Syed	Mamik Singh, KK Goswami, Deepika Sharma, Jaya Bhattacharya, Anand Suryavanshi, Amit Dhawan, Madhavi, Vaishali, Pamela, Aamir Dalvi, Tarana, Raja Vaid	4 July 2003
A bungalow built on the site of a mysterious fort becomes hell for the visitors.
100	100	"Vikraal to Battle Aghora"	Rajesh P Ranashinge	Arshad Syed	Mamik Singh, KK Goswami, Deepika Sharma, Vicky Ahuja, Puneet Vashisht, Darshan Kumar, Aanchal Saxena, Menaka Lalwani, Ganshyam Akela, Naveen Bharti, Veidehi, Jhanavi	11 July 2003
Lily and Gabru are trapped by an Aghora who seeks immortality.
101	101	"A Witch's Curse"	Prasad Gavandi	Arshad Syed	Manav Gohil, Tarana Raja, Kishwar Merchant, Anita Kanwal, Mamik Singh, KK Goswami, Vivek Chaudhury, Ekta Singh, Donna, Harsha	18 July 2003
The evil witch haunts the descendants of a particular clan.
102	102	"Ozom's Destruction"	Rajesh P Ranashinge	Ramneesh Puri	Mamik Singh, KK Goswami, Deepika Sharma, Mohan Kapoor, Raj Arjun, Shilpa Singh, Sandeep Bhansali, Raj Arjun, Akash Khan, Shruti, Disha	25 July 2003
Ozom, a Satan worshipper, easily wreaks havoc with death and destruction.
103	103	"A Malignant Naagin"	Rajesh P Ranashinge	Arshad Syed	Mamik Singh, KK Goswami, Deepika Sharma, Ravee Gupta, Vineet Sharma, Amit Dolawat, Savree Dasgupta, Kapil Soni, Sunil Matoo, Preeti Pundir, Rufi Sharma	8 August 2003
A naagin pines for her dead lover as innocent people pay the price for it.
104	104	"The Poisonous Land Mystery"	Manish R.Khandelwal	Arshad Syed	Mamik Singh, KK Goswami, Deepika Sharma, Adi Irani, Nigaar Khan, Hrishikesh Pandey, Madan Joshi, Pawan Mahendru, Manish Upadhyay, Afzal Khan, Mehboob Alam Khan, Angad Wadhawa	15 August 2003
With all their crops poisoned, the desperate villagers seek Vikraal's help.
105	105	"A Haunted Graveyard"	Rajesh P Ranashinge	Arshad Syed	Mamik Singh, KK Goswami, Deepika Sharma, Rakesh Paul, Aparna Bhatnagar	22 August 2003
Vikraal visits a haunted graveyard to retrieve a magical ring.
106	106	"Ayushman Escapes from Captivity"	Manish R.Khandelwal	Arshad Syed	Mamik Singh, KK Goswami, Noopur Joshi, Lalit Parimoo, Aditya Singh Rajput, Rahul Joshi, Jeevan Jairoop, Jahnavi, Sanjeev Siddhart, Chandni, Meenakshi Sahani, Reshma, Gulistan	29 August 2003
An evil spirit named Ayushman escapes from Vikraal's captivity and wreaks havoc in the city.
107	107	"Tuka, the King of Darkness"	Rajesh P Ranashinge	Arshad Syed	Mamik Singh, KK Goswami, Noopur Joshi, Hemant Choudhary, Gufi Paintal, Nishikant Dixit, Tina Joshi, Hemant Chadha, Menaka Lalwani, Mickey, Saif, Priyambada	5 September 2003
With the world plunged in darkness, Vikraal must take a bold step to bring the light back from an evil predator named Tuka.
108	108	"Markata's Revenge"	Prasad Gavandi	Arshad Syed	Mamik Singh, KK Goswami, Shiva Rindani, Vishnu Sharma, Jay Pathak, Reema Gupta, Gul Mansukhani, Pradeep, Girishma, Rohan, Samreen	12 September 2003
An ignorant Gabru accidentally releases an evil spirit named Markata.
109	109	"Sone Ki Daayan - Sonika"	Rajesh P Ranashinge	Arshad Syed	Mamik Singh, KK Goswami, Sunaina Gulia, Noopur Joshi, Nigaar Khan, Namrata Thapa, Ashish Kapoor, Rajeev Anand, Sanjeev Siddharth, Mithlesh, Shreya, Sadhna	19 September 2003
An evil witch, Sonika helps people only to trap them in her vicious plot.
110	110	"The Evil Magicians"	Prasad Gavandi	Arshad Syed	Mamik Singh, KK Goswami, Noopur Joshi, Jaya Bhattacharya, Mehul Nisar, Anuj Gupta, Sargam Singh, Vanita Thakur, Saveri Dasgupta, Naveen Singh, Vishal Saini, Gaurishankar, Vishuraj Sharma	26 September 2003
A group of excited kids unleash an evil curse upon themselves by fiddling with a magician's ancient artifact. Note: Last appearance of Mamik Singh as Vikraal.
111	111	"Captain Kishan Back in Action"	Guroudev Bhalla	Ramneesh Puri	Manav Gohil, Rashid Jaan, Subrat Dutta, Arif Khan, G.P Singh, Feroz Khan, Kavita Singh, Vishwajeet Soni, Sameer Ali, Ali, Muskaan	3 October 2003
A police chase leads to the death of Munna Mobile.
112	112	"Malina's Magic Wand"	Manish R.Khandelwal	Arshad Syed	Jiten Lalwani, Rashid Jaan, Simple Kaul, Amit Dolawat, Sherrin Varghese, Aparna Tarakad, Neejee Chhabra, Amit Dhawan, Dharmendra Singh, Harish Shetty	10 October 2003
In an attempt to hide from some goons, Harsh and Makran revive an evil witch named Malina.
113	113	"Sameera's Lost Locket"	Rajesh P Ranashinge	Arshad Syed	Neha Devi Singh, KK Goswami, Mamik Singh, Reshma Khan, Shahbaz Khan, Vishnu Sharma, Rishi Kapoor, Vaidehi, Ajit Bhagat, Prateek Kurana, Nitin Lozani, Raj Logani, Santosh Soni, Amarjeet	17 October 2003
Vikraal's weird request gets Lily and Gabru into trouble. Note: Footage from old episodes were used for Vikraal's appearances in this episode, as Mamik Singh left the show.
114	114	"The Battle of Superwomen"	Rajesh P Ranashinge	Arshad Syed	Neha Devi Singh, Mamik Singh, KK Goswami, Reshma Khan, Jiten Lalwani, Shahbaz Khan, Vishnu Sharma, Manini Mishra, Tom Alter, Savita Bajaj, Sunil Matoo, Prateek Khurana, Santosh Soni, Rishi Kapoor, Ajit Bhagat	24 October 2003
Lily and Gabru land in trouble as they get stuck in a vicious battle between two superwomen.
115	115	"Bijli's Quest"	Rajesh P Ranashinge	Arshad Syed	Jiten Lalwani, Mamik Singh, Neha Devi Singh, KK Goswami, Reshma Khan, Shahbaz Khan, Vishnu Sharma, Manini Mishra, Savita Bajaj, Naadir, Santosh Soni, Vijay Chandela, Aamir	31 October 2003
After successfully capturing Mayakaal's ghosts, Bijli sets out on a mission to defeat the evil sorcerer along with Captain.
116	116	"Battle of the Trikaal"	Rajesh P Ranashinge	Arshad Syed	Salil Ankola, Jiten Lalwani, Mamik Singh, Neha Devi Singh, KK Goswami, Reshma Khan, Shahbaz Khan, Vishnu Sharma, Savita Bajaj, Mukesh Rawal, Santosh Soni, Vijay Chandela, Aamir	7 November 2003
After a treacherous journey, Captain and Bijli reach Mayakaal's cave. Note: First appearance of Salil Ankola as Vikraal towards the end of the episode.
117	117	"Vikraal to Save Lily, Gabru"	Rohit Dwivedi	Arshad Syed	Salil Ankola, KK Goswami, Reshma Khan, Ali Asgar, Mac Mohan, Deepak Dutta, Jay Pathak,	14 November 2003
Lily and Gabru stumble upon an ancient map and decide to enter Ali Baba's secret cave.
118	118	"The Bijli Experiment"	Rajesh P Ranashinge	Arshad Syed	Neha Devi Singh, Kiran Dubey, Karan Grover, Nancy, Goolistan Gandhi	21 November 2003
Vishaka is pranked for bullying her fellow students, but eventually, she ends up becoming vengeful.
119	119	"Vikraal and the Duplicating Tree"	Suraj Rao	Arshad Syed	Salil Ankola, KK Goswami, Reshma Khan, Mehul Nisar, Subrat Dutta	28 November 2003
Vikraal and team go in search of a duplicating tree that's terrorising people.
120	120	"Deadly Echoes"	Manish R.Khandelwal	Arshad Syed	Jiten Lalwani, Rashid Jaan, Aditi Pratap, Manish Khanna, Mazher Sayed, Shano Hanspal, G.P Singh	5 December 2003
An echo point turns into a memorial site as a dangerous spirit targets innocent people with his powers.
121	121	"Maut Ki Sawaari"	Vivek Agnihotri	Arshad Syed	Salil Ankola, KK Goswami, Reshma Khan, Abhimanyu Singh, Aparna Tarakad, Girish Jain, Rajiv Kumar,	12 December 2003
An evil spirit delivers hitchhikers to their doom by offering to help them in their time of need.
122	122	"A Vain Witch"	Rajesh P Ranashinge	Arshad Syed	Neha Devi Singh, Arzoo Govitrikar, Abhay Kulkarni, Kuldeep Singh Ruhil, Neejee Chhabra, Kajal Jaisingh, Vijay Bhatia, Bijal Batavia, Aanchal Saxena, Mala Sareen, Goolistan Gandhi, Ranjan Ojha, Prakash Sudarshan, Swatantra Bharat, Karan Desai	19 December 2003
In search of eternal youth and beauty, an evil witch drinks the blood of unsuspecting victims.
123	123	"Bhoori Daayan Ka Kahar"	Vivek Agnihotri	Arshad Syed	Salil Ankola, KK Goswami, Reshma Khan, Ikhlaq Khan, Ravi Gossain, Amita Chandekar, Dadhi Pandey, Akhilesh Mishra, Nandini Gupta	26 December 2003
Bhoori Daayan slaughters and collects human heads.
124	124	"The Rise of Mercury Man"	Suraj Rao	Arshad Syed	Neha Devi Singh, KK Goswami, Reshma Khan, Parag Tyagi, Rio Kapadia, Abhishek Batra, Poonam Makhjan, Rohan Sahey, Supriya Sahu, Shital Raj, Namita verma, Aslam, Pratibha, Nilofer, Goolistan Gandhi	2 January 2004
With intentions to cause destruction to become more powerful, a Shaitaan creates 'Mercury Man'.
125	125	"The Web of Death"	Siba Mishra	Arshad Syed	Jiten Lalwani, Aditi Pratap, Rashid, Shiva Rindani, Arzoo Govitrikar, Neha, Ashish	9 January 2004
Three friends on a fun picnic soon fight for their lives as one of them is trapped in a giant web.
126	126	"Vikraal Calls Upon Trikaal"	Vivek Agnihotri	Arshad Syed	Salil Ankola, Jiten Lalwani, Neha Devi Singh, KK Goswami, Reshma Khan, Rashid, Vishnu Sharma, Sweta Keswani, Goolistan Gandhi, Franklin Fernandes, Aanchal Dwivedi, Kashmeera Talati, Ebbin Forbes, Peter	16 January 2004
When Vikraal's mission is stopped by a manipulative entity, he calls upon the powerful Trikaal for help.
127	127	"Sundari's Curse"	Manish R. Khandelwal	Arshad Syed	Neha Devi Singh, KK Goswami, Reshma Khan, Deepshika Nagpal, Nisha Sareen, Ashfaque Khan, Rajat Nath, Indu Shukla, Goolistan Gandhi, Akharsh, Rajesh	23 January 2004
Forced to live a cursed life, Sundari seeks Bijili's help to regain what she lost.
128	128	"Vikraal to Save Bijli"	Manish R Khandelwal	Arshad Syed	Salil Ankola, Neha Devi Singh, KK Goswami, Reshma Khan, Deepshika Nagpal, Mukesh Jadhav, Vishnu Sharma	30 January 2004
Sundari entraps Bijli and Gabru in a magical book.
129	129	"Kamini Seeks Vikraal's Help"	Vivek Agnihotri	Arshad Syed	Salil Ankola, KK Goswami, Reshma Khan, Shabnam Sayed, Vishnu Sharma, Brownie Parashar, Usha Bachani, Priya Joshi, Amit Mishra, Gauri Shankar, Johnny Sian, Lakhvinder Singh, Balle Grover	6 February 2004
During his quest to restore Kamini's voice, Vikraal enters a giant's lair.
130	130	"The Spooky Cave"	Suraj Rao	Arshad Syed	Salil Ankola, KK Goswami, Reshma Khan, Murali Sharma, Sheela Sharma, Yusuf Hussain, Uday Thakur, Deepak Verma	13 February 2004
A couple is targeted by a paranormal entity when they visit a historical cave.
131	131	"A Scientist Gone Mad"	Rajesh P Ranashinge	Arshad Syed	Neha Devi Singh, KK Goswami, Reshma Khan, Vicky Ahuja, Rishi Kapoor, Arup	20 February 2004
A scientist is banished from his laboratory for combining science with magic.
132	132	"A Case of Animal Disappearance"	Manish R Khandelwal	Arshad Syed	Jiten Lalwani, Aditi Pratap, KK Goswami, Reshma Khan, Kyaati Khandke Keswani, Sunil Matoo, Swapnali Kulkarni, Jagdish Pandey	5 March 2004
The captain investigates the sudden disappearance of domestic animals.
133	133	"Vikraal Takes Up a Task"	Aziz Khan	Arshad Syed	Salil Ankola, KK Goswami, Reshma Khan, Simple Kaul, Pawan Mehendru, Manoj Joshi, S.P Lalwani, Jaswinder Singh, Manaswi Dabhi, Urvashi Krishnan, Mayuresh Dandekar, Umesh Bajpai, Namita Verma, Atul Tondekar, Neelam Tondekar	12 March 2004
Vikraal learns a shocking truth from a soul.
134	134	"The Ninja Ghost"	Rajesh P Ranashinge	Arshad Syed	Neha Devi Singh, KK Goswami, Reshma Khan, Rishi Kapoor, Jeetu Verma, Randeep Mahadik, Manoj Joshi, Zeeshan	19 March 2004
A dead ninja warrior uses his dark magic to rob a magical crown.
135	135	"The Dancing Dracula"	Manish R.Khandelwal	Arshad Syed	Jiten Lalwani, KK Goswami, Reshma Khan, Manini Mishra, Mukesh Jadhav, Shano Hanspal, Abbas Ali, Sajid Khan, Sunil Tiwari, Rajendra Negi, Franklin Fernandez, Sameer Ali, Sanjay Sharma, Balle Grover, Prakash Jais, Younis	26 March 2004
A beautiful dancer in a night club unveils her real identity only to feed on the innocent visitors.
136	136	"Vikraal Fights Raka"	Rajesh P Ranashinge	Arshad Syed	Salil Ankola, KK Goswami, Reshma Khan, Vishnu Sharma, Vindu Dara Singh, Rudraksh Thakur, Aanchal Saxena, Kishan Thakkar, Nitika Anand Mukherjee, Vijay Kadam	2 April 2004
To avenge his brother, Raka plans to kill an adolescent Vikraal.
137	137	"Luka, the Evil Alien"	Mahim Joshi	Arshad Syed	Neha Devi Singh, KK Goswami, Reshma Khan, Vishnu Sharma, Rishi Kapoor, Nisha Sareen, Manasvi Vyas, Chittaranjan Giri, Manish Khanna, Vinod Upadhyay, Prakash Sudarshan	9 April 2004
An evil alien named Luka visits earth with a devastating plan in mind.
138	138	"Tulika to Bring a Magical Stone"	Rajesh P Ranashinge	Arshad Syed	Neha Devi Singh, Jiten Lalwani, KK Goswami, Rishi Kapoor, Nisha Sareen, Manasvi Vyas, Vinod Upadhyay, Navneet Chaddha, Pari Sheikh, Raj Patil, Subodh Kumar, Govind	16 April 2004
Bijli and Gabru land on a strange planet.
139	139	"The Magical Spectacles"	Gautam Jogelekar	Arshad Syed	Salil Ankola, KK Goswami, Reshma Khan, Ashish Kapoor, Rashid Jaan, Rajat Bhalla, Ajita Kulkarni, Rajnath, Giriraj Kabra, Vibhuti Trivedi	23 April 2004
A depressed ghost robs a pair of magical spectacles to fulfil his evil desire.
140	140	"Son Avenges His Father's Death"	Pavan S Kaul	Arshad Syed	Neha Devi Singh, KK Goswami, Reshma Khan, Prabhat Bhattacharya, Deepak Bhatia, Tom Alter, Goolistan Gandhi, Sandeep Mohan, Sushma Bhagwat, Deepti Jindal, Nikhil Khera, Raj Parekh, Johnny Sian, Ajit, Iravati	30 April 2004
Bijli outsmarts the ghost of an evil scientist.
141	141	"Captain Vs Bookworms"	Pavan S Kaul	Arshad Syed	Jiten Lalwani, Neha Devi Singh, Prabhat Bhattacharya, KK Goswami, Reshma Khan, Dimple Inamdar, Faraz Khan, Charmi Desai, Krishnakanth Bhardwaj, Aryan Singh, Ashfaq Khan, Kanika Maheshwari, Amit Dua, Kubli Sanehal, Neha Sahay	7 May 2004
Bijli advises the masked man not to misuse his magical powers.
142	142	"Vikraal Enters a Magical World"	Pavan S Kaul	Arshad Syed	Salil Ankola, KK Goswami, Reshma Khan, Sonal Pendse, Jaspal Sandhu, Rani Vashist, Faraz Khan	21 May 2004
Vikraal receives a letter with complains of paranormal abduction.
143	143	"Trikaal In Danger"	Pavan S Kaul	Arshad Syed	Salil Ankola, Neha Devi Singh, Jiten Lalwani, KK Goswami, Reshma Khan, Faraz Khan, Prabhat Bhattacharya, Vishnu Sharma, Tom Alter	28 May 2004
An evil spirit hypnotises the Trikaal using voodoo dolls.
144	144	"Singar to Kill Trikaal"	Pavan S Kaul	Arshad Syed	Salil Ankola, Neha Devi Singh, Jiten Lalwani, KK Goswami, Reshma Khan, Faraz Khan, Prabhat Bhattacharya, Vishnu Sharma	4 June 2004
After acquiring the prithvi stone, Singar decides to kill the Trikaal.
145	145	"The Mysterious Ice Cubes"	Rajesh P Ranashinge	Arshad Syed	Jiten Lalwani, KK Goswami, Reshma Khan, Vishnu Sharma, Tassnim Sheikh, Neejee Chhabra, Nitika Anand Mukherjee, Shyam Sharma, Tanzeem Khan, Jagdish Sharma, Zeeshan	11 June 2004
Captain receives news about strange occurrences involving ice cubes.
146	146	"Bijli on a Mission"	Vivek Agnihotri	Arshad Syed	Neha Devi Singh, KK Goswami, Reshma Khan, Vishnu Sharma, Tassnim Sheikh, Ravi Kishan, Aanchal Saxena, Goolistan Gandhi	18 June 2004
Guruji tells Bijli a way to defeat Jalsika while the latter is busy torturing innocent people.
147	147	"An Iceman in Action"	Vivek Agnihotri	Arshad Syed	Salil Ankola, KK Goswami, Reshma Khan, Ravi Kishan, Tassnim Sheikh, Ikhlaq Khan, Subrat Dutta, Prabhat Bhattacharya, Vikram Tomar, Sameer Ali, Vaijanti	25 June 2004
The deadly Iceman decides to kill Vikraal after he captures his lover, Barfika.
148	148	"Bijli, Nakaab on a Mission"	Suraj Rao	Arshad Syed	Neha Devi Singh, KK Goswami, Prabhat Bhattacharya, Vishnu Sharma, Shabnam Sayed, Vaishnavi Sharma, Deepak Jethi, Sonali Goswami, Santosh Tiwari, Vijay Kumar, Prabhakar, Kapil	2 July 2004
Victor and Kimaya kidnap Manvi to sacrifice her to Shaitaan and evoke Bhujang.
149	149	"Bhujang to Kill Bijli"	Pavan S Kaul	Arshad Syed	Neha Devi Singh, Prabhat Bhattacharya, Vishnu Sharma, Deepak Jethi, Vaishnavi Sharma, Swapnali Kulkarni, Dimple Inamdar, Goolistan Gandhi, Sonali Goswami, Santosh Tiwari, Honey Lalwani, Gulshan Tekchandani, Kuldeep Rana, Gauri Shankar	9 July 2004
Guruji tells Bijli about a mystical sword which could defeat Bhujang. Meanwhile, Bhujang is desperate to kill her while the sword goes missing.
150	150	"Vikraal Meets His Father"	Vivek Agnihotri	Arshad Syed	Salil Ankola, Neha Devi Singh, KK Goswami, Reshma Khan, Murali Sharma, Sherrin Varghese Vishnu Sharma, Prabhat Bhattacharya, Gooliatan Gandhi, Simple Kaul, Manoj Anand, Bhupinder Singh, Gulshan Tek Chandani, Faizal Sheikh	16 July 2004
Vikraal meets his father in a graveyard and receives some shocking information. Later, Mrityukaal manages to subdue Vikraal.
151	151	"Mrityukaal Captures Trikaal"	Vivek Agnihotri	Arshad Syed	Neha Devi Singh, Jiten Lalwani, Prabhat Bhattacharya, Salil Ankola, KK Goswami, Reshma Khan, Vishnu Sharma, Murali Sharma, Sherrin Varghese, Simple Kaul, Goolistan Gandhi, Pawan Mahendru, Anurag Bali, Bhupinder Singh, Gulshan Tek Chandani, Shiv Kumar Verma, Faizal Sheikh, Manoj Anand, Franklin Fernandez	23 July 2004
Mrityukaal turns Vikraal into a stone and entraps Bijli and Captain.
152	152	"Mrityukaal's Rampage"	Vivek Agnihotri	Arshad Syed	Salil Ankola, KK Goswami, Reshma Khan, Vishnu Sharma, Prabhat Bhattacharya, Neha Devi Singh, Jiten Lalwani, Murali Sharma, Nisha Sareen, Anand Patil, Raj Patil, Vijay Chandela	30 July 2004
Mrityukaal continues his tirade, capturing Captain and Bijli.
153	153	"Tashnima Hypnotises Vikraal"	Manish R.Khandelwal	Arshad Syed	Salil Ankola, KK Goswami, Reshma Khan, Dimple Inamdar, Raj Logani, Vaishali Saini, Amit Dolawat, Vishal Lalwani, S.P Lalwani, Ritesh Singh	6 August 2004
Vikraal chases Tashnima, who turns human beings into playing cards. Later, she uses her magical powers on Vikraal after Lily and Gabru succumb to her evil ploy.
154	154	"Bijli, Captain to Rescue Vikraal"	Vivek Agnihotri	Arshad Syed	Salil Ankola, Neha Devi Singh, Jiten Lalwani, KK Goswami, Reshma Khan, Dimple Inamdar, Sunil Matoo, Sushma Bhagwat, Sailesh Rajei, Raj Logani, Vaishali Saini, Amit Dolawat, Vishal Lalwani, S.P Lalwani, Ritesh Singh	13 August 2004
Hypnotised by Tashnima, Vikraal seeks Bijli and Captain's help. Later, the duo sets out for Tashnagar in order to defeat Tashnima.

=== Season 2 (2006–09) ===
No. overall	No. in season	Title	Directed by	Written by	Casting	Original release date
155	1	"Jauhar"	Unknown	Unknown	Ali Merchant, Anupam Bhattacharya, Ravi Mahashabde, Firdaus Dadi, Minnie Tiwari, Roshani Shetty (Cameo)	3 November 2006
156	2	"Victortia No. 401"	Unknown	Unknown	Mona Vasu, Lavina Tandon, Raayo S. Bakhirta, Ram Awana, Kush Sharma	10 November 2006
157	3	"Waaris"	Unknown	Unknown	Mukul Dev, Tarun Arora, Amit Dolawat, Amin Gazi, Sunila Karambelkar, Pradeep Kabra	17 November 2006
158	4	"Jaadugar"	Unknown	Unknown	Mohit Malik	24 November 2006
159	5	"Kaun hai"	Unknown	Unknown	Mihir Mishra, Minnie Tiwari, Yajuvendra Singh, Ashraful Haque	1 December 2006
160	6	"Junoon"	Unknown	Unknown	Amrapali Gupta, Sharhaan Singh, Nishant Shokeen, Surabhi Prabhu, Firdaus Mevawala, Deepak Jethi, Shaji Chaudhary, Jagraj Ghooman	8 December 2006
161	7	"Dhruvtaal"	Unknown	Unknown	Karan Grover, Kunal Bakshi, Rohit Arora, Shamik Abbas	15 December 2006
162	8	"Pahadi Daayan"	Unknown	Unknown	Ajay Chaudhary , Ishita Sharma, Maansi Jain, Jitendra Hirawat, Santosh Kaushik, Vicky Ahuja, Vijay Ganju	22 December 2006
163	9	"Bhoot Bangla"	Unknown	Unknown	Romit Raj, Ashish Sharma, Shraddha Arya, Maansi Jain	29 December 2006
164	10	"Dasvi Dulhan"	Unknown	Unknown	Jas Arora, Rohit Khurana, Payal Singh, Nikhil Guharoy	5 January 2007
165	11	"Hostel"	Unknown	Unknown	Megha Gupta, Roshani Shetty, Jay Pathak, Jitendra Hirawat, Priya Ahuja, Geetanjali Minhas, Vicky Ahuja	12 January 2007
166	12	"Dedh Foot Ki Dehshat"	Unknown	Unknown	KK Goswami, Karanveer Mehra, Shamik Abbas	19 January 2007
167	13	"Jai Mata Ki"	Unknown	Unknown	Amrapali Gupta, Saurabh Pandey, Namrata Thapa, Akhil Mishra	26 January 2007
168	14	"Bhediya"	Unknown	Unknown	Shakti Arora, Mayank Anand, Megha Gupta, Himanshu Malhotra, Roshani Shetty, Pankaj Kalra, Payal Nair	2 February 2007
169	15	"Trinkoni"	Unknown	Unknown	Kushal Punjabi, Gopal K. Singh, Arjun Dwivedi	9 February 2007
170	16	"Rukmani Mansion"	Unknown	Unknown	Vijay Ganju, Mohit Malik, Sunny Singh, Alok Narula, Aarti Thakur, Jai Yadav, Mehul Nisar, Jignesh Mehta, Mohit Chauhan (Cameo)	16 February 2007
171	17	"Khooni Billi"	Unknown	Unknown	Rucha Gujarathi, Rohit Arora, Nyra Banerjee, Rajeeta Kochhar	23 February 2007
172	18	"Terrace"	Unknown	Unknown	Ali Merchant, Hunar Hali, Sonica Handa, Pubali Sanyal	2 March 2007
173	19	"Room No. 13"	Unknown	Unknown	Kushal Punjabi, Karishma Randhawa, Navina Bole, Shashank Sethi, Jaanvi Sangwan, Rajeeta Kochhar	9 March 2007
174	20	"TattooMan"	Unknown	Unknown	Chetan Hansraj, Barkha Bisht, Sameer Sharma, Vinod Kapoor, Deepak Bhatia	16 March 2007
175	21	"Dacait"	Unknown	Unknown	Nirmal Pandey, Shakti Arora, Bhumika Girdhar, Anwar Fatehan, Ajay Chaudhary, Vicky Ahuja	23 March 2007
176	22	"Honeymoon"	Unknown	Unknown	Mayank Anand, Priya Arya, Ansha Sayed, Nidhi Seth, Jignesh Joshi, Ajaz Khan, Rajeev Bhardwaj, Jaanvi Sangwan, Aastha Chaudhary (Cameo)	30 March 2007
177	23	"Chits"	Unknown	Unknown	Neha Marda, Raj Logani, Sreejita De, Nandish Sandhu, Abhay Bhargava	6 April 2007
178	24	"Friday The 13th"	Unknown	Unknown	Lalit Parimoo, Gopal K Singh, Rahul Arora	13 April 2007
179	25	"Senapati"	Unknown	Unknown	Ali Merchant, Jitendra Hirawat, Vinod Kapoor, Sameer Sharma, Payal Singh	20 April 2007
180	26	"Naagin"	Unknown	Unknown	Vishwajeet Pradhan, Nandish Sandhu, Melanie Nazereth, Shamik Abbas	27 April 2007
181	27	"Meghna"	Unknown	Unknown	Chandana Sharma,Shakti Arora, Praneet Bhat	4 May 2007
182	28	"Chhalawa"	Unknown	Unknown	Ajay Chaudhary, Mayank Anand, Jitendra Hirawat, Samragyi Nema	11 May 2007
183	29	"Daayan Bani Dulhan"	Unknown	Unknown	Abir Goswami,Ami Trivedi, Meghna Malik, Farida Dadi, Yajuvendra Singh, Shankar Mishra	18 May 2007
184	30	"Bhai"	Unknown	Unknown	Mayank Anand,Himanshu Malhotra, Vinod Kapoor, Kuldeep Ruhil	25 May 2007
185	31	"Khoon Bhari Aankh"	Unknown	Unknown	Raj Logani, Megha Gupta, Sukirti Kandpal, Kunal Bakshi, Pankaj Kalra, Shamik Abbas	1 June 2007
186	32	"Ghungroo"	Unknown	Unknown	Sonia Singh, Melanie Pais, Karanveer Mehra, Payal Singh, Deepraj Rana, Vicky Ahuja, Nikhil Guharoy	8 June 2007
187	33	"Laal Rang"	Unknown	Unknown	Shakti Arora, Nidhi Seth, Sanjay Swaraj, Gopal K Singh, Deepraj Rana	15 June 2007
188	34	"Dastakhat"	Unknown	Unknown	Tarun Khanna,Sonia Singh,Praneet Bhat, Roshani Shetty,Anant Jog,Gargi Patel,Tabrez Khan (Cameo),	22 June 2007
189	35	"Jai Maa Durga"	Unknown	Unknown	Ali Merchant,Amrapali Gupta,Vijay Ganju,Samragyi Nema,Sudhir Dalvi	29 June 2007
190	36	"Yakshi"	Unknown	Unknown	Rahil Azam,Himanshu Malhotra,Ajay Chaudhary,Reshma Modi,Farida Dadi,Pradeep Kabra,Payal Singh,Pooja Pihal	6 July 2007
191	37	"Chhoona Mana Hai"	Unknown	Unknown	Rahil Azam,Sonia Singh,Bharat Chawda,Praneet Bhat,Roshani Shetty	13 July 2007
192	38	"Shaitaani Sipahi"	Unknown	Unknown	Rahil Azam, Jai Yadav, Minnie Tiwari, Rajesh Dubey	20 July 2007
193	39	"Shaitaan Aa Raha Hai"	Unknown	Unknown	Rahil Azam,Minnie Tiwari,Sukirti Kandpal	27 July 2007
194	40	"Baat Ek Raat Ki"	Unknown	Unknown	Ali Merchant,Ashish Sharma,Ravi Mahashabde,Bharat Chawda	3 August 2007
195	41	"Saaya"	Unknown	Unknown	Tarun Khanna,Mona Vasu,Naveen Saini, Samragyi Nema	10 August 2007
196	42	"Maut Ka Chakravyuh"	Unknown	Unknown	Nirmal Pandey,Benaf Dadachandji, Jai Yadav, Jitendra Hirawat, Ansha Sayed, Gopal K Singh, Rajesh Dubey	17 August 2007
197	43	"Hospital"	Unknown	Unknown	Shakti Arora,Shama Sikander,Vijay Ganju,Namrata Thapa	24 August 2007
198	44	"Kitaab Jaadu Aur Teen Chudail"	Unknown	Unknown	Sonia Singh, Minnie Tiwari, Samragyi Nema,Jay Pathak, Sushma Prashant, Pankaj Kalra	31 August 2007
199	45	"Khooni Kuan"	Unknown	Unknown	Ali Merchant, Melanie Pais, Hunar Hali, Rahul Arora	7 September 2007
200	46	"Shiva"	Unknown	Unknown	Indira Krishnan, Sukirti Kandpal, Kuldeep Ruhil, Yajuvendra Singh, Saurabh Dubey	14 September 2007
201	47	"Intiqaam"	Unknown	Unknown	Mukul Dev, Nidhi Seth, Abhinav Kapoor, Ram Awana, Bharat Kapoor, Praneet Bhat	21 September 2007
202	48	"Deewar"	Unknown	Unknown	Chandana Sharma, Vineeta Malik, Girish Jain, Jasveer Kaur, Sukirti Kandpal, Jignesh Mehta	28 September 2007
203	49	"Chhupa Chhupi"	Unknown	Unknown	Shashi Sharma, Alok Narula, Pooja Pihal, Vijay Ganju	5 October 2007
204	50	"Suhaag Raat"	Unknown	Unknown	Mohit Malik, Melanie Pais, Jaya Binju, Vinod Kapoor, Manish Khanna, Deepak Bhatia	12 October 2007
205	51	"Maut Ki Ginti"	Unknown	Unknown	Alok Narula, Ankita Shrivastava, Girish Jain, Pradeep Kabra	19 October 2007
206	52	"Karwa Chauth"	Unknown	Unknown	Ali Merchant, Melanie Pais, Vineeta Malik, Manasvi Vyas	26 October 2007
207	53	"Ek Bhoot Ek Vakil Ek Shaitaan"	Unknown	Unknown	Abir Goswami, Ridheema Tiwari,Sheena Bajaj, Piku Sharma, Pankaj Kalra, Brij Gopal	2 November 2007
208	54	"Graha Pravesh"	Unknown	Unknown	Melanie Pais, Jeetu Malkani, Neena Cheema, Anant Jog, Neha Bam, Payal Singh	9 November 2007
209	55	"Karkhana"	Unknown	Unknown	Gaurav Khanna, Bhuvnesh Mann, Surabhi Prabhu, Shankar Mishra	16 November 2007
210	56	"Johnny Joker"	Unknown	Unknown	Minnie Tiwari, Girish Jain, Jeetu Malkani, Kush Sharma	23 November 2007
211	57	"Gaadi Mat Rokna"	Unknown	Unknown	Abir Goswami, Gayatri Choudhari, Jaya Binju, Shakti Arora, Vijay Ganju	30 November 2007
212	58	"Co-Wife [or] Husband's other wife"	Unknown	Unknown	Bhuvnesh Mann, Rucha Gujarathi, Anant Jog, Gargi Patel	14 December 2007
213	59	"Co-Wife [or] Husband's other wife"	Unknown	Unknown	Bhuvnesh Mann, Rucha Gujarathi, Anant Jog, Gargi Patel	15 December 2007
214	60	"The New Mother"	Unknown	Unknown	Reema Vohra, Anmol Singh, Vinod Kapoor, Sunita Sengupta, Utkarsha Naik, Vineeta Malik, Shivani Gosain, Neena Cheema	21 December 2007
215	61	"The New Mother"	Unknown	Unknown	Reema Vohra, Anmol Singh, Vinod Kapoor, Sunita Sengupta, Utkarsha Naik, Vineeta Malik, Shivani Gosain, Neena Cheema	22 December 2007
216	62	"The Old Temple"	Unknown	Unknown	Kushal Punjabi, Chhavi Mittal, Shakti Arora, Vicky Ahuja, Ashwin Kaushal	28 December 2007
217	63	"The Old Temple"	Unknown	Unknown	Kushal Punjabi, Chhavi Mittal, Shakti Arora, Vicky Ahuja, Ashwin Kaushal	29 December 2007
218	64	"The Trap"	Unknown	Unknown	Karan V Grover, Melanie Pais, Avika Gor, Roshani Shetty, Manish Naggdev, Raju Shrestha, Jignesh Mehta	4 January 2008
219	65	"The Trap"	Unknown	Unknown	Karan V Grover, Melanie Pais, Avika Gor, Roshani Shetty, Manish Naggdev, Raju Shrestha, Jignesh Mehta	5 January 2008
220	66	"Girl who wins the heart"	Unknown	Unknown	Mukul Dev, Tina Parekh, Kunal Bakshi, Veena Kapoor	11 January 2008
221	67	"Girl who wins the heart"	Unknown	Unknown	Mukul Dev, Tina Parekh, Kunal Bakshi, Veena Kapoor	12 January 2008
222	68	"The Entertainment"	Unknown	Unknown	Hrishikesh Pandey, Amrapali Gupta, Himani Shivpuri, Anant Jog, Somesh Agarwal, Rajendra Chawla	18 January 2008
223	69	"The Entertainment"	Unknown	Unknown	Hrishikesh Pandey, Amrapali Gupta, Himani Shivpuri, Anant Jog, Somesh Agarwal, Rajendra Chawla	19 January 2008
224	70	"Seventh Groom"	Unknown	Unknown	Shaleen Bhanot, Malini Kapoor, Chandana Sharma, Payal Singh, Varun Sethi, Shamikh Abbas, Shankar Mishra	25 January 2008
225	71	"Seventh Groom"	Unknown	Unknown	Shaleen Bhanot, Malini Kapoor, Chandana Sharma, Payal Singh, Varun Sethi, Shamikh Abbas, Shankar Mishra	26 January 2008
226	72	"Two Yards Under the Ground"	Unknown	Unknown	Nikhil Arya, Umang Jain, Manish Khanna, Shivani Gosain, Jignesh Mehta, Raju Shrestha, Vinod Kapoor, Anwar Fatehan	1 February 2008
227	73	"Two Yards Under the Ground"	Unknown	Unknown	Nikhil Arya, Umang Jain, Manish Khanna, Shivani Gosain, Jignesh Mehta, Raju Shrestha, Vinod Kapoor, Anwar Fatehan	2 February 2008
228	74	"GOH: Do Not Look Behind"	Unknown	Unknown	KK Goswami, Tarun Khanna, Puneet Sachdev, Melanie Pais, Piku Sharma, Akansha Kanjilal, Shamkik Abbas	8 February 2008
229	75	"GOH: Do Not Look Behind"	Unknown	Unknown	KK Goswami, Tarun Khanna, Puneet Sachdev, Melanie Pais, Piku Sharma, Akansha Kanjilal, Shamkik Abbas	9 February 2008
230	76	"Examination of the Mother Goddess"	Unknown	Unknown	Mamik Singh, Kruttika Desai, Shakti Arora, Abhinav Kohli, Reema Vohra, Utkarsha Naik, Shaji Bahadur	15 February 2008
231	77	"Examination of the Mother Goddess"	Unknown	Unknown	Mamik Singh, Kruttika Desai, Shakti Arora, Abhinav Kohli, Reema Vohra, Utkarsha Naik, Shaji Bahadur	16 February 2008
232	78	"The Demon"	Unknown	Unknown	Ridheema Tiwari, Ashwin Kaushal, Manish Naggdev, Manoj Biddvai, Abhinav Kohli	22 February 2008
233	79	"The Demon"	Unknown	Unknown	Ridheema Tiwari, Ashwin Kaushal, Manish Naggdev, Manoj Biddvai, Abhinav Kohli	23 February 2008
234	80	"your wish my lover"	Unknown	Unknown	Ayaz Khan, Neha Devi Singh, Farida Dadi, Payal Singh, Raju Shrestha, Kaushal Kapoor, Mithilesh Chaturvedi	29 February 2008
235	81	"your wish my lover"	Unknown	Unknown	Ayaz Khan, Neha Devi Singh, Farida Dadi, Payal Singh, Raju Shrestha, Kaushal Kapoor, Mithilesh Chaturvedi	1 March 2008
236	82	"victory to lord krishna"	Unknown	Unknown	Mukul Dev, Aditya Kapadia, Raj Premi, Jignesh Mehta, Mangala Kenkre, Rajendra Chawla, Anant Jog, Imran Khan	7 March 2008
237	83	"victory to lord krishna"	Unknown	Unknown	Mukul Dev, Aditya Kapadia, Raj Premi, Jignesh Mehta, Mangala Kenkre, Rajendra Chawla, Anant Jog, Imran Khan	8 March 2008
238	84	"Goddess Sherawali"	Unknown	Unknown	Rucha Gujarathi, Varun Sethi, Vinod Kapoor, Tarakesh Chauhan, Harsh Vashisht, Utkarsha Naik, Veena Kapoor, Jaanvi Sangwan	14 March 2008
239	85	"Goddess Sherawali"	Unknown	Unknown	Rucha Gujarathi, Varun Sethi, Vinod Kapoor, Tarakesh Chauhan, Harsh Vashisht, Utkarsha Naik, Veena Kapoor, Jaanvi Sangwan	15 March 2008
240	86	"Come Sakhi, let's play Holi"	Unknown	Unknown	Sonia Singh, Kshitee Jog, Puneet Sachdev, Jeetu Malkani, Parull Chaudhry, Vineeta Malik, Gargi Patel, Meenakshi Verma	21 March 2008
241	87	"Come Sakhi, let's play Holi"	Unknown	Unknown	Sonia Singh, Kshitee Jog, Puneet Sachdev, Jeetu Malkani, Parull Chaudhry, Vineeta Malik, Gargi Patel, Meenakshi Verma	22 March 2008
242	88	"Balighat's Banyan"	Unknown	Unknown	Rushad Rana, Nandini Singh, Adi Irani, Abhimanyu Singh	28 March 2008
243	89	"Balighat's Banyan"	Unknown	Unknown	Rushad Rana, Nandini Singh, Adi Irani, Abhimanyu Singh	29 March 2008
244	90	"Sister-in-Law"	Unknown	Unknown	Priyamvada Sawant, Nikhil Arya, Kishwer Merchant, Kanika Kalra, Neha Bam, Shankar Mishra, Niloufer	4 April 2008
245	91	"Sister-in-Law"	Unknown	Unknown	Priyamvada Sawant, Nikhil Arya, Kishwer Merchant, Kanika Kalra, Neha Bam, Shankar Mishra, Niloufer	5 April 2008
246	92	"Epoch"	Unknown	Unknown	Sudhanshu Pandey, Ridheema Tiwari, Shruti Ulfat, Umang Jain, Anmol Singh, Veena Kapoor, Reshama Modi, Shankar Mishra	11 April 2008
247	93	"Epoch"	Unknown	Unknown	Sudhanshu Pandey, Ridheema Tiwari, Shruti Ulfat, Umang Jain, Anmol Singh, Veena Kapoor, Reshama Modi, Shankar Mishra	12 April 2008
248	94	"Mother"	Unknown	Unknown	Tuhina Vohra, Manish Naggdev, Kanika Kalra, Kruttika Desai, Rajeeta Kochhar	18 April 2008
249	95	"Mother"	Unknown	Unknown	Tuhina Vohra, Manish Naggdev, Kanika Kalra, Kruttika Desai, Rajeeta Kochhar	19 April 2008
250	96	"The Celestial Weapon"	Unknown	Unknown	Gaurav Khanna, Chhavi Mittal, Raju Shrestha, Vijay Ganju, Jeetu Malkani	25 April 2008
251	97	"The Celestial Weapon"	Unknown	Unknown	Gaurav Khanna, Chhavi Mittal, Raju Shrestha, Vijay Ganju, Jeetu Malkani	26 April 2008
252	98	"Devdasi"	Unknown	Unknown	Neetha Shetty, Malini Kapoor, Ashish Sharma, Vicky Ahuja	2 May 2008
253	99	"Devdasi 2"	Unknown	Unknown	Neetha Shetty, Malini Kapoor, Ashish Sharma, Vicky Ahuja	3 May 2008
254	100	"Power holder king"	Unknown	Unknown	Nikhil Arya, Nandini Singh, Avinash Mukherjee, Raj Premi, Tuhina Vohra, Rinku Worah, Abhinav Kohli	9 May 2008
255	101	"Power holder king"	Unknown	Unknown	Nikhil Arya, Nandini Singh, Avinash Mukherjee, Raj Premi, Tuhina Vohra, Rinku Worah, Abhinav Kohli	10 May 2008
256	102	"Vakra Viraal Mala"	Unknown	Unknown	Puneet Sachdev, Neetha Shetty	16 May 2008
257	103	"Vakra Viraal Mala 2"	Unknown	Unknown	Puneet Sachdev, Neetha Shetty	17 May 2008
258	104	"The Shadow"	Unknown	Unknown	Shaleen Bhanot, Twinkle Bajpai, Shamikh Abbas, Parull Chaudhry	23 May 2008
259	105	"The Shadow"	Unknown	Unknown	Shaleen Bhanot, Twinkle Bajpai, Shamikh Abbas, Parull Chaudhry	24 May 2008
260	106	"Inheritance"	Unknown	Unknown	Mihir Mishra, Mrinal Deshraj, Shakti Arora, Vicky Ahuja, Reshma Modi	30 May 2008
261	107	"Inheritance"	Unknown	Unknown	Mihir Mishra, Mrinal Deshraj, Shakti Arora, Vicky Ahuja, Reshma Modi	31 May 2008
262	108	"Pitch-Eared"	Unknown	Unknown	Jeetu Malkani, Jignesh Mehta, Adi Irani, Shivani Gosain, Meenakshi Verma, Raju Shrestha	6 June 2008
263	109	"Pitch-Eared"	Unknown	Unknown	Jeetu Malkani, Jignesh Mehta, Adi Irani, Shivani Gosain, Meenakshi Verma, Raju Shrestha	7 June 2008
264	110	"You are Mine"	Unknown	Unknown	Twinkle Bajpai, Puneet Vashist	13 June 2008
265	111	"You are Mine"	Unknown	Unknown	Twinkle Bajpai, Puneet Vashist	14 June 2008
266	112	"Ghostly Shadow"	Unknown	Unknown	Gaurav Khanna, Shakti Arora, Nidhi Seth	20 June 2008
267	113	"Ghostly Shadow"	Unknown	Unknown	Gaurav Khanna, Shakti Arora, Nidhi Seth	21 June 2008
268	114	"The Return"	Unknown	Unknown	Ashish Sharma, Ram Awana, Shivani Gosain, Meenakshi Verma, Dinesh Kaushik	27 June 2008
269	115	"The Return"	Unknown	Unknown	Ashish Sharma, Ram Awana, Shivani Gosain, Meenakshi Verma, Dinesh Kaushik	28 June 2008
270	116	"Amrauli's Demons"	Unknown	Unknown	Naman Shaw, Natasha Sharma, Shamikh Abbas, Manish Naggdev, Jaanvi Sangwan, Vijay Ganju	4 July 2008
271	117	"Amrauli's Demons"	Unknown	Unknown	Naman Shaw, Natasha Sharma, Shamikh Abbas, Manish Naggdev, Jaanvi Sangwan, Vijay Ganju	5 July 2008
272	118	"Murder's Revenge will be murder"	Unknown	Unknown	Nirmal Pandey, Nandish Sandhu, Manish Khanna	11 July 2008
273	119	"Murder's Revenge will be murder"	Unknown	Unknown	Nirmal Pandey, Nandish Sandhu, Manish Khanna	12 July 2008
274	120	"The Night"	Unknown	Unknown	Rushad Rana, Malini Kapoor, Ridheema Tiwari, Dinesh Kaushik	18 July 2008
275	121	"The Night"	Unknown	Unknown	Rushad Rana, Malini Kapoor, Ridheema Tiwari, Dinesh Kaushik	19 July 2008
276	122	"Bloody Shadow"	Unknown	Unknown	Manish Paul, Lavina Tandon, Veena Kapoor, Ashwin Kaushal	25 July 2008
277	123	"Bloody Shadow"	Unknown	Unknown	Manish Paul, Lavina Tandon, Veena Kapoor, Ashwin Kaushal	26 July 2008
278	124	"Bloody Figures"	Unknown	Unknown	Raju Shrestha, Vicky Ahuja, Puneet Sachdev, Priyamvada Sawant, Shamikh Abbas	1 August 2008
279	125	"Bloody Figures"	Unknown	Unknown	Raju Shrestha, Vicky Ahuja, Puneet Sachdev, Priyamvada Sawant, Shamikh Abbas	2 August 2008
280	126	"Wandering Souls"	Unknown	Unknown	Vineet Raina, Mahhi Vij, Alok Narula, Abhinav Kohli, Madhuri Sanjeev	8 August 2008
281	127	"Wandering Souls"	Unknown	Unknown	Vineet Raina, Mahhi Vij, Alok Narula, Abhinav Kohli, Madhuri Sanjeev	9 August 2008
282	128	"Actress"	Unknown	Unknown	Jaanvi Sangwan, Abhinav Kohli, Pubali Sanyal	15 August 2008
283	129	"Actress"	Unknown	Unknown	Jaanvi Sangwan, Abhinav Kohli, Pubali Sanyal	16 August 2008
284	130	"The Murderous Office"	Unknown	Unknown	Neha Devi Singh, Prenal Oberoi, Raju Shrestha, Shamikh Abbas	22 August 2008
285	131	"The Murderous Office"	Unknown	Unknown	Neha Devi Singh, Prenal Oberoi, Raju Shrestha, Shamikh Abbas	23 August 2008
286	132	"Who Was She"	Unknown	Unknown	TBA	29 August 2008
287	133	"Who Was She"	Unknown	Unknown	TBA	30 August 2008
288	134	"Guest House"	Unknown	Unknown	Manish Paul, KK Goswami, Tanya Abrol: Alok Narula	5 September 2008
289	135	"Guest House"	Unknown	Unknown	Manish Paul, KK Goswami, Tanya Abrol	6 September 2008
290	136	"Creepy Secret"	Unknown	Unknown	Payal Nair, Ashok Lokhande	12 September 2008
291	137	"Creepy Secret"	Unknown	Unknown	Payal Nair, Ashok Lokhande	13 September 2008
292	138	"Photo"	Unknown	Unknown	Puneet Vashisht, Nandini Singh	19 September 2008
293	139	"Photo"	Unknown	Unknown	Puneet Vashisht, Nandini Singh	20 September 2008
294	140	"Sister"	Unknown	Unknown	Sreejita De, Nishigandha Wad	26 September 2008
295	141	"Sister"	Unknown	Unknown	Sreejita De, Nishigandha Wad	27 September 2008
296	142	"First Child"	Unknown	Unknown	Ajay Chaudhary, Roshani Shetty	3 October 2008
297	143	"First Child"	Unknown	Unknown	Ajay Chaudhary, Roshani Shetty	4 October 2008
298	144	"A Common Man"	Unknown	Unknown	Tushar Dalvi, Tuhina Vohra, Manish Arora	10 October 2008
299	145	"A Common Man"	Unknown	Unknown	Tushar Dalvi, Tuhina Vohra, Manish Arora	11 October 2008
300	146	"Devil's Screws"	Unknown	Unknown	Puneet Sachdev, Manava Naik, Amit Behl	17 October 2008
301	147	"Devil's Screws"	Unknown	Unknown	Puneet Sachdev, Manava Naik, Amit Behl	18 October 2008
302	148	"Man-eating Wolf"	Unknown	Unknown	Chandana Sharma	24 October 2008
303	149	"Man-eating Wolf"	Unknown	Unknown	Chandana Sharma	25 October 2008
304	150	"Police Station"	Unknown	Unknown	TBA	31 October 2008
305	151	"Police Station"	Unknown	Unknown	TBA	1 November 2008
306	152	"Black Witch"	Unknown	Unknown	Rashami Desai, Kanika Kalra, Manish Paul, Kunal Bakshi, Shankar Mishra	7 November 2008
307	153	"Black Witch"	Unknown	Unknown	Rashami Desai, Kanika Kalra, Manish Paul, Kunal Bakshi, Shankar Mishra	8 November 2008
308	154	"Dark"	Unknown	Unknown	Kushal Punjabi, Raju Shrestha	14 November 2008
309	155	"Dark"	Unknown	Unknown	Kushal Punjabi, Raju Shrestha	15 November 2008
310	156	"Mirror"	Unknown	Unknown	Nikhil Arya, Chhavi Mittal	21 November 2008
311	157	"Mirror"	Unknown	Unknown	Nikhil Arya, Chhavi Mittal	22 November 2008
312	158	"Princess of Vallabhgarh"	Unknown	Unknown	Suhasi Dhami, Alyy Khan, Abhimanyu Singh, Vicky Ahuja	26 December 2008
313	159	"Princess of Vallabhgarh"	Unknown	Unknown	Suhasi Dhami, Alyy Khan, Abhimanyu Singh, Vicky Ahuja	27 December 2008
314	160	"Princess of Vallabhgarh"	Unknown	Unknown	Suhasi Dhami, Alyy Khan, Abhimanyu Singh, Vicky Ahuja	2 January 2009
315	161	"Princess of Vallabhgarh"	Unknown	Unknown	Suhasi Dhami, Alyy Khan, Abhimanyu Singh, Vicky Ahuja	3 January 2009
316	162	"Princess of Vallabhgarh"	Unknown	Unknown	Suhasi Dhami, Alyy Khan, Abhimanyu Singh, Vicky Ahuja	9 January 2009
317	163	"Princess of Vallabhgarh"	Unknown	Unknown	Suhasi Dhami, Alyy Khan, Abhimanyu Singh, Vicky Ahuja	10 January 2009
318	164	"Princess of Vallabhgarh"	Unknown	Unknown	Suhasi Dhami, Alyy Khan, Abhimanyu Singh, Vicky Ahuja	16 January 2009
319	165	"Princess of Vallabhgarh"	Unknown	Unknown	Suhasi Dhami, Alyy Khan, Abhimanyu Singh, Vicky Ahuja	17 January 2009
320	166	"Doom"	Unknown	Unknown	Gaurav Chopra, Twinkle Bajpai, Tarun Khanna, Raju Shrestha, Jay Pathak	23 January 2009
321	167	"Doom"	Unknown	Unknown	Gaurav Chopra, Twinkle Bajpai, Tarun Khanna, Raju Shrestha, Jay Pathak	24 January 2009
322	168	"Doom"	Unknown	Unknown	Gaurav Chopra, Twinkle Bajpai, Tarun Khanna, Raju Shrestha, Jay Pathak	30 January 2009
323	169	"Doom"	Unknown	Unknown	Gaurav Chopra, Twinkle Bajpai, Tarun Khanna, Raju Shrestha, Jay Pathak	31 January 2009
324	170	"Doom"	Unknown	Unknown	Gaurav Chopra, Twinkle Bajpai, Tarun Khanna, Raju Shrestha, Jay Pathak	6 February 2009
325	171	"Doom"	Unknown	Unknown	Gaurav Chopra, Twinkle Bajpai, Tarun Khanna, Raju Shrestha, Jay Pathak	7 February 2009
326	172	"Doom"	Unknown	Unknown	Gaurav Chopra, Twinkle Bajpai, Tarun Khanna, Raju Shrestha, Jay Pathak	13 February 2009
327	173	"Doom"	Unknown	Unknown	Gaurav Chopra, Twinkle Bajpai, Tarun Khanna, Raju Shrestha, Jay Pathak	14 February 2009
328	174	"Honeymoon Hotel"	Unknown	Unknown	Manish Paul, Nandini Singh, Kurush Deboo, Reshma Modi	20 February 2009
329	175	"Honeymoon Hotel"	Unknown	Unknown	Manish Paul, Nandini Singh, Kurush Deboo, Reshma Modi	21 February 2009
330	176	"Black Mountain"	Unknown	Unknown	Kushal Punjabi	27 February 2009
331	177	"Black Mountain"	Unknown	Unknown	Kushal Punjabi	28 February 2009
332	178	"Cradle"	Unknown	Unknown	Rucha Gujarathi, Utkarsha Naik, Shilpa Anand	6 March 2009
333	179	"Cradle"	Unknown	Unknown	Rucha Gujarathi, Utkarsha Naik, Shilpa Anand	7 March 2009
334	180	"Anamika"	Unknown	Unknown	Aastha Chaudhary	13 March 2009
335	181	"Anamika"	Unknown	Unknown	Aastha Chaudhary	14 March 2009
336	182	"Demon maid"	Unknown	Unknown	Megha Gupta, Shankar Mishra	20 March 2009
337	183	"Demon maid"	Unknown	Unknown	Megha Gupta, Shankar Mishra	21 March 2009
338	184	"Final sacrifice"	Unknown	Unknown	Ram Awana	27 March 2009
339	185	"Final sacrifice"	Unknown	Unknown	Ram Awana	28 March 2009
340	186	"Goodbye"	Unknown	Unknown	Gautam Rode, Vicky Ahuja, Anmol Dhiman	3 April 2009
341	187	"Goodbye"	Unknown	Unknown	Gautam Rode, Vicky Ahuja, Anmol Dhiman	4 April 2009
342	188	"Thakur's bride"	Unknown	Unknown	Mukul Dev, Amrapali Gupta, Rajeeta Kochhar	10 April 2009
343	189	"Thakur's bride"	Unknown	Unknown	Mukul Dev, Amrapali Gupta, Rajeeta Kochhar	11 April 2009
344	190	"Hunt"	Unknown	Unknown	Harsh Vashisht	17 April 2009
345	191	"Hunt"	Unknown	Unknown	Harsh Vashisht	18 April 2009
346	192	"Savitri"	Unknown	Unknown	Ali Merchant, Praneet Bhat, Sreejita De	24 April 2009
347	193	"Savitri"	Unknown	Unknown	Ali Merchant, Praneet Bhat, Sreejita De	25 April 2009
348	194	"Mark"	Unknown	Unknown	Mukesh Khanna, Eijaz Khan, Aastha Chaudhary, Diwakar Pundir, Indira Krishnan, Varisht Saniyal, Manasvi Vyas, Ashwin Kaushal, Pratap Sachdev, Hemant Choudhary, Vicky Ahuja, Rajeeta Kochhar, Amit Behl	1 May 2009
349	195	"Mark"	Unknown	Unknown	Mukesh Khanna, Eijaz Khan, Aastha Chaudhary, Diwakar Pundir, Indira Krishnan, Varisht Saniyal, Manasvi Vyas, Ashwin Kaushal, Pratap Sachdev, Hemant Choudhary, Vicky Ahuja, Rajeeta Kochhar, Amit Behl	2 May 2009
350	196	"Mark"	Unknown	Unknown	Mukesh Khanna, Eijaz Khan, Aastha Chaudhary, Diwakar Pundir, Indira Krishnan, Varisht Saniyal, Manasvi Vyas, Ashwin Kaushal, Pratap Sachdev, Hemant Choudhary, Vicky Ahuja, Rajeeta Kochhar, Amit Behl	8 May 2009
351	197	"Mark"	Unknown	Unknown	Mukesh Khanna, Eijaz Khan, Aastha Chaudhary, Diwakar Pundir, Indira Krishnan, Varisht Saniyal, Manasvi Vyas, Ashwin Kaushal, Pratap Sachdev, Hemant Choudhary, Vicky Ahuja, Rajeeta Kochhar, Amit Behl	9 May 2009
352	198	"Mark"	Unknown	Unknown	Mukesh Khanna, Eijaz Khan, Aastha Chaudhary, Diwakar Pundir, Indira Krishnan, Varisht Saniyal, Manasvi Vyas, Ashwin Kaushal, Pratap Sachdev, Hemant Choudhary, Vicky Ahuja, Rajeeta Kochhar, Amit Behl	15 May 2009
353	199	"Mark"	Unknown	Unknown	Mukesh Khanna, Eijaz Khan, Aastha Chaudhary, Diwakar Pundir, Indira Krishnan, Varisht Saniyal, Manasvi Vyas, Ashwin Kaushal, Pratap Sachdev, Hemant Choudhary, Vicky Ahuja, Rajeeta Kochhar, Amit Behl	16 May 2009
354	200	"Mark"	Unknown	Unknown	Mukesh Khanna, Eijaz Khan, Aastha Chaudhary, Diwakar Pundir, Indira Krishnan, Varisht Saniyal, Manasvi Vyas, Ashwin Kaushal, Pratap Sachdev, Hemant Choudhary, Vicky Ahuja, Rajeeta Kochhar, Amit Behl	22 May 2009
355	201	"Mark"	Unknown	Unknown	Mukesh Khanna, Eijaz Khan, Aastha Chaudhary, Diwakar Pundir, Indira Krishnan, Varisht Saniyal, Manasvi Vyas, Ashwin Kaushal, Pratap Sachdev, Hemant Choudhary, Vicky Ahuja, Rajeeta Kochhar, Amit Behl	23 May 2009
356	202	"Vision"	Unknown	Unknown	Rucha Gujarathi, Shakti Anand, Praneet Bhatt	5 June 2009
357	203	"Vision"	Unknown	Unknown	Rucha Gujarathi, Shakti Anand, Praneet Bhatt	6 June 2009
358	204	"Vision"	Unknown	Unknown	Rucha Gujarathi, Shakti Anand, Praneet Bhatt	12 June 2009
359	205	"Vision"	Unknown	Unknown	Rucha Gujarathi, Shakti Anand, Praneet Bhatt	13 June 2009
360	206	"Vision"	Unknown	Unknown	Rucha Gujarathi, Shakti Anand, Praneet Bhatt	19 June 2009
361	207	"Vision"	Unknown	Unknown	Rucha Gujarathi, Shakti Anand, Praneet Bhatt	20 June 2009
362	208	"Vision"	Unknown	Unknown	Rucha Gujarathi, Shakti Anand, Praneet Bhatt	26 June 2009
363	209	"Vision"	Unknown	Unknown	Rucha Gujarathi, Shakti Anand, Praneet Bhatt	27 June 2009
364	210	"Wait"	Unknown	Unknown	Gautam Rode, Divyanka Tripathi, Amrapali Gupta, Raj Premi, Utkarsha Naik, Rituraj Singh, Siddharth Vasudev, Vicky Ahuja, Kishan Bhan, Pradeep Kabra	17 July 2009
365	211	"Wait"	Unknown	Unknown	Gautam Rode, Divyanka Tripathi, Amrapali Gupta, Raj Premi, Utkarsha Naik, Rituraj Singh, Siddharth Vasudev, Vicky Ahuja, Kishan Bhan, Pradeep Kabra	18 July 2009
366	212	"Wait"	Unknown	Unknown	Gautam Rode, Divyanka Tripathi, Amrapali Gupta, Raj Premi, Utkarsha Naik, Rituraj Singh, Siddharth Vasudev, Vicky Ahuja, Kishan Bhan, Pradeep Kabra	24 July 2009
367	213	"Wait"	Unknown	Unknown	Gautam Rode, Divyanka Tripathi, Amrapali Gupta, Raj Premi, Utkarsha Naik, Rituraj Singh, Siddharth Vasudev, Vicky Ahuja, Kishan Bhan, Pradeep Kabra	25 July 2009
368	214	"Wait"	Unknown	Unknown	Gautam Rode, Divyanka Tripathi, Amrapali Gupta, Raj Premi, Utkarsha Naik, Rituraj Singh, Siddharth Vasudev, Vicky Ahuja, Kishan Bhan, Pradeep Kabra	31 July 2009
369	215	"Wait"	Unknown	Unknown	Gautam Rode, Divyanka Tripathi, Amrapali Gupta, Raj Premi, Utkarsha Naik, Rituraj Singh, Siddharth Vasudev, Vicky Ahuja, Kishan Bhan, Pradeep Kabra	1 August 2009
370	216	"Wait"	Unknown	Unknown	Gautam Rode, Divyanka Tripathi, Amrapali Gupta, Raj Premi, Utkarsha Naik, Rituraj Singh, Siddharth Vasudev, Vicky Ahuja, Kishan Bhan, Pradeep Kabra	7 August 2009
371	217	"Wait"	Unknown	Unknown	Gautam Rode, Divyanka Tripathi, Amrapali Gupta, Raj Premi, Utkarsha Naik, Rituraj Singh, Siddharth Vasudev, Vicky Ahuja, Kishan Bhan, Pradeep Kabra	8 August 2009
372	218	"Wait"	Unknown	Unknown	Gautam Rode, Divyanka Tripathi, Amrapali Gupta, Raj Premi, Utkarsha Naik, Rituraj Singh, Siddharth Vasudev, Vicky Ahuja, Kishan Bhan, Pradeep Kabra	14 August 2009
373	219	"Wait"	Unknown	Unknown	Gautam Rode, Divyanka Tripathi, Amrapali Gupta, Raj Premi, Utkarsha Naik, Rituraj Singh, Siddharth Vasudev, Vicky Ahuja, Kishan Bhan, Pradeep Kabra	15 August 2009
374	220	"Wait"	Unknown	Unknown	Gautam Rode, Divyanka Tripathi, Amrapali Gupta, Raj Premi, Utkarsha Naik, Rituraj Singh, Siddharth Vasudev, Vicky Ahuja, Kishan Bhan, Pradeep Kabra	21 August 2009
375	221	"Wait"	Unknown	Unknown	Gautam Rode, Divyanka Tripathi, Amrapali Gupta, Raj Premi, Utkarsha Naik, Rituraj Singh, Siddharth Vasudev, Vicky Ahuja, Kishan Bhan, Pradeep Kabra	22 August 2009

=== Season 3 (2010) ===
No. overall	No. in season	Title	Directed by	Written by	Casting	Original release date
376	1	"Tritiya"	Unknown	Unknown	Gauri Tonk, Sandeep Rajora, Naman Shaw, Ashish Kapoor, Murli Sharma, Mouni Roy, Anupriya Kapoor	19 March 2010
377	2	"Tritiya"	Unknown	Unknown	Gauri Tonk, Sandeep Rajora, Naman Shaw, Ashish Kapoor, Murli Sharma, Mouni Roy, Anupriya Kapoor	20 March 2010
378	3	"Tritiya"	Unknown	Unknown	Gauri Tonk, Sandeep Rajora, Naman Shaw, Ashish Kapoor, Murli Sharma, Mouni Roy, Anupriya Kapoor	26 March 2010
379	4	"Tritiya"	Unknown	Unknown	Gauri Tonk, Sandeep Rajora, Naman Shaw, Ashish Kapoor, Murli Sharma, Mouni Roy, Anupriya Kapoor	27 March 2010
380	5	"Tritiya"	Unknown	Unknown	Gauri Tonk, Sandeep Rajora, Naman Shaw, Ashish Kapoor, Murli Sharma, Mouni Roy, Anupriya Kapoor	2 April 2010
381	6	"Tritiya"	Unknown	Unknown	Gauri Tonk, Sandeep Rajora, Naman Shaw, Ashish Kapoor, Murli Sharma, Mouni Roy, Anupriya Kapoor	3 April 2010
382	7	"Tritiya"	Unknown	Unknown	Gauri Tonk, Sandeep Rajora, Naman Shaw, Ashish Kapoor, Murli Sharma, Mouni Roy, Anupriya Kapoor	10 April 2010
383	8	"Tritiya"	Unknown	Unknown	Gauri Tonk, Sandeep Rajora, Naman Shaw, Ashish Kapoor, Murli Sharma, Mouni Roy, Anupriya Kapoor	11 April 2010
384	9	"Tritiya"	Unknown	Unknown	Gauri Tonk, Sandeep Rajora, Naman Shaw, Ashish Kapoor, Murli Sharma, Mouni Roy, Anupriya Kapoor	17 April 2010
385	10	"Tritiya"	Unknown	Unknown	Gauri Tonk, Sandeep Rajora, Naman Shaw, Ashish Kapoor, Murli Sharma, Mouni Roy, Anupriya Kapoor	18 April 2010
386	11	"Tritiya"	Unknown	Unknown	Gauri Tonk, Sandeep Rajora, Naman Shaw, Ashish Kapoor, Murli Sharma, Mouni Roy, Anupriya Kapoor	24 April 2010
387	12	"Tritiya"	Unknown	Unknown	Gauri Tonk, Sandeep Rajora, Naman Shaw, Ashish Kapoor, Murli Sharma, Mouni Roy, Anupriya Kapoor	25 April 2010
388	13	"Tritiya"	Unknown	Unknown	Gauri Tonk, Sandeep Rajora, Naman Shaw, Ashish Kapoor, Murli Sharma, Mouni Roy, Anupriya Kapoor	1 May 2010
389	14	"Tritiya"	Unknown	Unknown	Gauri Tonk, Sandeep Rajora, Naman Shaw, Ashish Kapoor, Murli Sharma, Mouni Roy, Anupriya Kapoor	2 May 2010
390	15	"Tritiya"	Unknown	Unknown	Gauri Tonk, Sandeep Rajora, Naman Shaw, Ashish Kapoor, Murli Sharma, Mouni Roy, Anupriya Kapoor	8 May 2010
391	16	"Tritiya"	Unknown	Unknown	Gauri Tonk, Sandeep Rajora, Naman Shaw, Ashish Kapoor, Murli Sharma, Mouni Roy, Anupriya Kapoor	9 May 2010
392	17	"Tritiya"	Unknown	Unknown	Gauri Tonk, Sandeep Rajora, Naman Shaw, Ashish Kapoor, Murli Sharma, Mouni Roy, Anupriya Kapoor	15 May 2010
393	18	"Tritiya"	Unknown	Unknown	Gauri Tonk, Sandeep Rajora, Naman Shaw, Ashish Kapoor, Murli Sharma, Mouni Roy, Anupriya Kapoor	16 May 2010

=== Vikraal Aur Gabraal ===
The series starred KK Goswami and Mamik Singh, who was replaced by Salil Ankola, Jiten Lalwani, Neha Devi Singh in later episodes, according to the storyline change and introduction of the series Ssshhhh... Koi Hai – Trikaal.

No. overall	No. in season	Title	Directed by	Written by	Casting	Original release date
1	1	"Werewolf"	Mukul Abhyankar	Aditya Narain Singh	Mamik Singh, KK Goswami, Paintal, Hiten Paintal, Tom Alter, Aashish Kaul	27 July 2003
2	2	"The Sea"	Pavan S Kaul	Arshad Syed	Mamik Singh, KK Goswami, Chetan Hansraj, Rahil Azam, Deepak Bhatia, Gufraan, Sachin Kaul, Rajat Gawda, Sairin, Shaukat Baig	3 August 2003
3	3	"Who Was She?"	Pavan S Kaul	Samir Modi	Mamik Singh, KK Goswami, Neha Dhupia, Shiva Rindani	10 August 2003
4	4	"The Murderous Cat"	Suraj Rao	Rajeev Aggarwal	Mamik Singh, KK Goswami, Suvarna Jha, Shakti Singh, Ronit Roy	17 August 2003
5	5	"The Mountainous King"	Pavan S Kaul	Arshad Syed	Mamik Singh, KK Goswami, Chetan Hansraj, Namrata Thapa	24 August 2003
6	6	"G D A 2551"	Pavan S Kaul	Arshad Syed	Mamik Singh, KK Goswami, Shruti Seth, Ronit Roy	31 August 2003
7	7	"Joker"	Mukul Abhyankar	Aditya Narain Singh	Mamik Singh, KK Goswami	7 September 2003
8	8	"The Genie of the Lamp"	Suraj Rao	Sameer Modi	Mamik Singh, KK Goswami, Shiva Rindani	14 September 2003
9	9	"Bhora Tantrik"	Glenn Baretto, Ankush Mohla	Jayesh Patil	Mamik Singh, KK Goswami, Tej Sapru	21 September 2003
10	10	"The Mummy"	Pavan S Kaul	Arshad Syed	Mamik Singh, KK Goswami, Tej Sapru	28 September 2003
11	11	"Jazeera Island"	Pavan S Kaul	Arshad Syed	Mamik Singh, KK Goswami, Himani Shivpuri, Vishal Puri	5 October 2003
12	12	"Aghori"	Unknown	Unknown	Jiten Lalwani, KK Goswami	12 October 2003
13	13	"Rang Barse"	Suraj Rao	Sameer Modi	Salil Ankola, KK Goswami, Kamya Punjabi	19 October 2003
14	14	"Ashes"	Pavan S Kaul	Arshad Syed, Imtiyaz Baghdadi	Salil Ankola, KK Goswami, Mac Mohan, Prithvi Zutshi, Savita Bajaj, Rahil Azam,	26 October 2003
15	15	"Friendship"	Mahim Joshi	Bijesh Jayarajan	Salil Ankola, KK Goswami, Gaurav Chanana, Amita Chandekar, Barkha Madan	2 November 2003
16	16	"The Condition"	Pavan S Kaul	Arshad Syed	Salil Ankola, KK Goswami, Parmeet Sethi, Kamya Punjabi, Hrishikesh Pandey	9 November 2003
17	17	"Where Have We Come?"	Pavan S Kaul	Sameer Modi	Salil Ankola, KK Goswami, Vindu Dara Singh (cameo)	16 November 2003
18	18	"Magic"	Raju	Sanjeev Gandhi	Salil Ankola, KK Goswami, Sadiya Siddiqui, Neha Pendse, Amita Chandekar	23 November 2003
19	19	"Jasof to Gogla"	Unknown	Unknown	Salil Ankola, KK Goswami	30 November 2003
20	20	"The Incomplete Ending"	Mukul Abhyankar	Aditya Narain Singh	Salil Ankola, KK Goswami, Sanjeev Vatsa, Sanjeev Vatsa, Kamia Malhotra, Munavvar Ali Khan, Alok Ulfat, Abhishek Sharma, Shaleen Singh, Vaishali Rao Khande, Ashu Goel, Minu Chopra	7 December 2003
21	21	"Possible"	Arif	Abhinav S. Kashyap	Salil Ankola, KK Goswami, Irrfan Khan, Gireesh Sahdev	14 December 2003
22	22	"The Ghost of King Vikram Singh"	Unknown	Unknown	Salil Ankola, KK Goswami	21 December 2003
23	23	"Tantrik"	Unknown	Unknown	Salil Ankola, KK Goswami, Lalit Parimoo	28 December 2003
24	24	"Khel Khel Mein"	Kaushik Ghatak	Aditya Narain Singh	Salil Ankola, KK Goswami, Gaurav Gera, Kunal Kumar, Shruti Seth	4 January 2004
25	25	"Discipline"	Unknown	Unknown	Salil Ankola, KK Goswami	11 January 2004
26	26	"The Market"	Raju	Rajgaru	Salil Ankola, KK Goswami, Vindu Dara Singh	18 January 2004
27	27	"The Death Sentence"	Suraj Rao	Sanjeev Gandhi	Salil Ankola, KK Goswami	25 January 2004
28	28	"Electricity"	Ankush Mohla, Glenn Baretto	Jayesh Patil	Neha Devi Singh, KK Goswami, Yashpal Sharma, Tina Parekh	1 February 2004
29	29	"Zehreena"	Unknown	Unknown	Neha Devi Singh, KK Goswami	8 February 2004
30	30	"The Eyes"	Sachin S Khot	Rajesh Ranashinge	Salil Ankola, KK Goswami	15 February 2004
31	31	"The Vampire"	Unknown	Unknown	Salil Ankola, KK Goswami	22 February 2004
32	32	"The Graveyard"	Unknown	Unknown	Salil Ankola, KK Goswami	29 February 2004
33	33	"Chehre Pe Chehra"	Pavan S Kaul	Arshad Syed, Imtiyaz Baghdadi	Salil Ankola, KK Goswami	7 March 2004
34	34	"Cruel Jailor"	S. Subramaniam	Arshad Syed, Imtiyaz Baghdadi	Salil Ankola, KK Goswami	14 March 2004
35	35	"Bheriya"	Unknown	Unknown	Salil Ankola, KK Goswami	21 March 2004
36	36	"The Palace"	Unknown	Unknown	Salil Ankola, KK Goswami	28 March 2004
37	37	"Tantra Vidya"	Unknown	Unknown	Salil Ankola, KK Goswami	4 April 2004
38	38	"Dekha Jayega"	Kaushik Ghatak	Sameer Gupta	Salil Ankola, KK Goswami	11 April 2004
39	39	"Who Is There?"	S. Subramanin	Arshad, Imtiyaz	Salil Ankola, KK Goswami	18 April 2004
40	40	"Painter"	Sourabh Narang, Mahim Joshi	Aditya Narain Singh	Salil Ankola, KK Goswami, Meghna Kothari, Joy Sengupta	25 April 2004
41	41	"The Neighbour"	Pavan S Kaul	Arshad, Imtiyaz	Salil Ankola, KK Goswami	2 May 2004
42	42	"Champa"	Gaurav Pandey	Gaurav Pandey	Salil Ankola, KK Goswami	9 May 2004
43	43	"The Dark Night"	Kaushik Ghatak	Sanjeev Gandhi	Salil Ankola, KK Goswami	16 May 2004
44	44	"Laawaris"	Pramod Pradhan	Dilip Mukharia, Amit Vachharajani	Salil Ankola, KK Goswami	23 May 2004
