= Shaukat Baig =

Indian screenwriter and actor

- Occupations: Actor; Writer; Assistant Director

Shaukat Baig is an Indian actor, writer and assistant director who works mainly for Bollywood and Indian TV serials. He written more than 50 TV serials and over 20 Bollywood films. A former actor, he performed supporting roles in Bollywood films, including the television show Zaban Sambhal Ke.

== Early life ==
Shaukat begun his career in theater as a writer and dramatic actor. He debuted in film industry in year 1992 as a writer.

== Writer of films ==
Baig writes films, television, and poetry. His first Bollywood movie was Chamatkar, released in 1992.

Name of film	Release	Work as
Chamatkar	1992	Writer
Zabaan Sambhal Ke	1993	Writer
Mumbai Calling	2007	Writer
Bhram: An Illusion	2008	Writer

== Writer of TV serials ==
Name of series	Release	Work as
Rap Fever	1993	Writer
Goondaraj	1993	Writer
The Crook	1993	Writer
Love Affair	1993	Writer
Mohan in Trouble	1993	Writer
Zabaan Sambhal Ke	1993-1997	Writer
Money Money Money	1994	Writer
Nautanki	1994	Writer
The Nawab's Parrot	1994	Writer
Charles' Uncle	1994	Writer
Love at First Sight	1994	Writer
The Game of Love	1997	Writer

== Actor in films ==
Film	Character name	Release in			
Raju Ban Gaya Gentleman	---	1992			
Such a Long Journey	Waiter	1998			
The Warrior	Clerk	2001			
Style	college dean	2001	88 Antop Hill	Murli Mansukhani	2003
Sssshhh...	Murli Mansukhani	2003			
Krishna Cottage	Murli Mansukhani	2004			
Khoya Khoya Chand	Prem Kumar's secretary	2007			
Bhram: An Illusion	Shaukat Baig	2008			
Aagey Se Right	Hasmukh Irani	2009			
