= Ek Aur Ek Gyarah =

2003 Indian film by David Dhawan

- Poster
- Directed by: David Dhawan
- Screenplay by: Yunus Sajawal
- Dialogues: Aman Jaffery; Bholu Khan
- Story by: Shahnawaz Ahmed
- Produced by: Subhash Ghai
- Starring: Sanjay Dutt; Govinda (actor); Amrita Arora; Nandini Singh; Jackie Shroff
- Cinematography: Nadeem Khan
- Edited by: David Dhawan
- Music by: Songs: Shankar–Ehsaan–Loy; Score: Amar Mohile
- Distributed by: Mukta Arts Ltd.
- Release date: 28 March 2003
- Running time: 156 minutes
- Country: India
- Language: Hindi
- Budget: ₹9.5 crore
- Box office: ₹21 crore

Ek Aur Ek Gyarah (transl. One and one is eleven) is a 2003 Indian Hindi-language action comedy film directed by David Dhawan. The film stars Sanjay Dutt, Govinda (actor), Amrita Arora, Nandini Singh, and Jackie Shroff.

== Synopsis ==
Tara (Govinda) and Sitara (Sanjay Dutt) are brothers who are notorious, lovable, small-town con-men who are always in trouble with the law. One day, when the police are chasing them, they mistakenly shoot one of the most deadly criminals, who goes by the name Cobra (Ashish Vidyarthi). They look for cover and find themselves at Major Ram Singh's house (Jackie Shroff), who got Cobra's brother Panther (Gulshan Grover) arrested because he and Cobra tried to steal a very advanced gun. Tara and Sitara go to Singh's house, but since he is an army officer, he initially doesn't allow them but later does.

Living in his house for a while, Tara and Singh's sister Pinky (Nandini Singh) fall in love; Sitara and Singh's sister's friend Preeti(Amrita Arora) fall in love, too. One day, while in the house, they watch TV and learn that Cobra has returned. They realise that Cobra has kidnapped their mother (Himani Shivpuri), so he can force Tara and Sitara to get Panther out of Ram Singh's jail. They succeed in getting Panther out of jail. Cobra returns their mother.

Ram Singh realises that he has been fooled by the two; they watch him on TV being embarrassed by the media. Sitara and Tara realise they should get revenge on Cobra and Panther. They go to Singh's house and tell him how they were forced by Cobra to deceive him. Singh forgives them. The brothers leave to catch the two criminals. They succeed, and all ends well.

== Cast ==
- Sanjay Dutt as Sitara
- Govinda as Tara
- Amrita Arora as Preeti
- Nandini Singh as Pinky Singh
- Jackie Shroff as Major Ram Singh
- Gulshan Grover as Panther
- Ashish Vidhyarthi as Cobra
- Rajpal Yadav as Chotu
- Javed Khan as Raju Nepali
- Mushtaq Khan as Inspector Bahadur Singh
- Himani Shivpuri as Tara and Sitara's mother
- Supriya Karnik as Preeti's mother
- Tiku Talsania as Tiku
- Mahesh Anand as Capt. Mahesh
- Ajay Nagrath as Ram Singh's son
- Ajit Vachani as Dr. Subramaniam
- Om Puri as narrator

== Soundtracks ==
The soundtrack was composed by Shankar–Ehsaan–Loy, with lyrics written by Sameer.

Ek Aur Ek Gyarah

Soundtrack album by Shankar–Ehsaan–Loy
- Released: 28 March 2003 (India)
- Genre: Feature film soundtrack
- Labels: T-Series Tips Music
- Producer: Shankar–Ehsaan–Loy

Shankar–Ehsaan–Loy chronology
Yeh Kya Ho Raha Hai? (2002)	Ek Aur Ek Gyarah (2003)	Armaan (2003)

#	Title	Singer(s)	Length
1	"Ek Aur Ek Gyarah"	Sonu Nigam, Shankar Mahadevan	06:03
2	"Beimaan Mohabbat"	Shankar Mahadevan, KK, Gayatri Iyer	04:51
3	"Main Jogiya"	Shankar Mahadevan, Udit Narayan, Sneha Pant	05:35
4	"O Dushmana"	Sonu Nigam, Sowmya Raoh	06:44
5	"Thoda Sone Ka"	Udit Narayan, Sneha Pant	05:46
6	"Yeh Mann Mera Bada Hi Chaliyan" (not in the film)	Abhijeet, Babul Supriyo	05:34
