= Aditya Singh Rajput =

Indian actor (1990–2023)

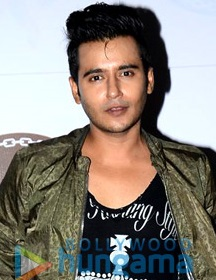
- Born: 19 August 1990; Delhi, India
- Died: 22 May 2023 (aged 32); Mumbai, Maharashtra, India
- Occupation: Actor
- Years active: 2003–2023

Aditya Singh Rajput (19 August 1990 – 22 May 2023) was an Indian television actor, who did various TV commercials and roles in Hindi television shows and Bollywood films.

Rajput was born in Delhi on 19 August 1990. He started his career at the age of 11. He died in Mumbai on 22 May 2023, at the age of 32.

== Filmography ==
=== Films ===
- 2006 – We R Friends
- 2008 – Aadi King
- 2010 – Mom And Dad: The Lifeline Love
- 2010 – Paiyaa
- 2014 – 3 A.M.
- 2016 – Lovers

=== Television ===
- Gandii Baat (episodic role)
- Rajputana (Singh) (2015–2020)
- Love (episodic role)
- Ashiqui (episodic role)
- Code Red (episodic role) (2015)
- Aawaz (season 9) (episodic role)
- MTV Splitsvilla (Season 9) (2016)
- Bigg Boss (Season 12) (2018)
- MTV Webbed (episodic role)
- Cambala Investigation Agency (2007–2009)
