= Neha Devi Singh =

Indian television actress and writer

- Born: 9 August 1981 (age 44); Mumbai, Maharashtra, India
- Other name: Neha Singh
- Occupations: Actress, writer
- Years active: 2003–2009
- Known for: Bijli in Ssshhhh... Koi Hai

Neha Devi Singh (born 9 August 1981) is an Indian television actress and writer, best known for her portrayal of Sameera / Bijli in Ssshhhh...Koi Hai and Bhoomika Arjun Goenka in Saarrthi. She is the first television actress in India to work as an action hero.

== Early life ==
Neha Devi Singh was born on 9 August 1981 in Mumbai, India. Singh received a degree in economics from St. Xavier's College. She set out to seek work in the television industry. She pursued a career as a director or producer, but became an actor.

== Career ==
Singh made her television debut with Ssshhhh...Koi Hai as Sameera / Bijli. she was last seen in Saarrthi as Bhoomika Arjun Goenka on Star Plus. After two and a half years of a successful run with Saarrthi, she left the serial in 2007 and was replaced by Zalak Thakker as the protagonist Bhoomika Arjun Goenka.

== Post–acting ==
After leaving Saarrthi in 2007, Singh became a columnist for Channel Y–a youth page in Mumbai newsline as well as a contributor to the weekend addition of the Financial Express in 2009. She has become a professional writer and has written the script for a film.

In 2010–2011, she worked as the Project Supervisor for Deepa Sahi's directorial debut Tere Mere Phere produced by Ketan Mehta (of Mya Movies Pvt ltd.) and Anup Jalota, released September 2011. As of February 2012 she is the project head and creative consultant for new projects in Asit Modi's Neela Telefilms.

== Television ==
Year:	Show:	Role:	Channel:
2003–2004	Ssshhhh...Koi Hai	Sameera / Bijli	Star Plus
2003-2004	Vikraal Aur Gabraal	Sameera / Bijli	Star Plus
2004–2007	Saarrthi	Bhoomika Arjun Goenka	Star Plus
2008	Ssshhhh... Phir Koi Hai - Khooni Daftar : Part 1 & Part 2	Episode 130 & Episode 131	Star One
2009	Aahat Season 4 - When the dead returns (Kabristhan)	Leena (Episode 6)	Sony TV
