= Mukesh Jadhav =

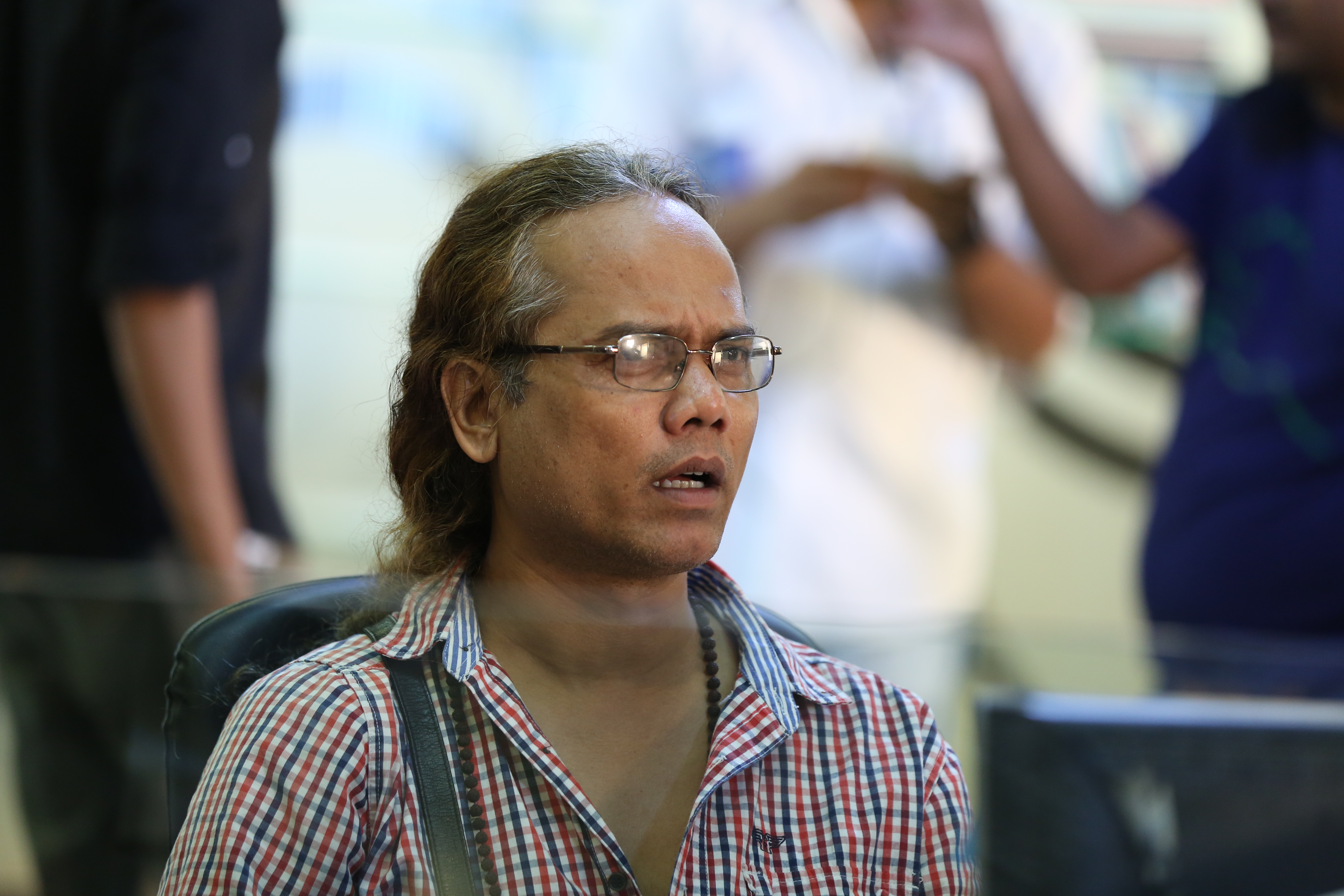
- Mukesh Jadhav on the set of movie Pratichhaya, 2016
- Born: Mukesh B. Jadhav; 1967 (age 58–59); Mumbai, Maharashtra, India
- Occupations: Film director, screenwriter, actor
- Years active: 1989 –present

Mukesh Jadhav (born 1967) is an Indian film actor, director, and screenwriter.

== Career ==
Mukesh a theatre actor, writer, and director, began his career in the year 1989, when he was doing his masters in Chemistry at Mithibai College, Mumbai University. He has received many awards for best actor and best director at a National level for his theatre productions.

Post which he went on to act in serials such as Woh, Ssshhhh...Koi Hai, Karma (TV series), Aahat and Gudgudee.

Mukesh along with his acting career, joined director Kundan Shah as an associate director for films such as Kya Kehna, Dil Hai Tumhaara and Loveria. He has worked with director Keval Singh on the Indo-Canadian production The City. He has writing credits on films such as Scotland Express, Dil Hai Tumhaara and many television drama serials.

His directorial debut was with the Marathi feature film Kachru Mazha Bapa. He has written and directed several TV ad films, musical shows, corporate events, documentary and corporate films.

Mukesh has also professionally trained actors like - Preity Zinta, Vivek Oberoi, Shreyas Talpade and Vidyut Jamwal.

In 2011 he received the Star Pravah Gurudakshina award, after being nominated by Shreyas Talpade.

== Filmography ==
- Pratichhaya (director, expected 2019)
- Anaan (writer, 2017)
- Kachru Mazha Bapa (director, 2016)
- "Dil Hai Tumhara" (associate director, 2002) directed by Kundan Shah
- Loveria (associate director) directed by Kundan Shah
- Kya Kehna (associate director, 2000) directed by Kundan Shah
- The City (associate director) directed by Keval Singh
- Hum To Mohabbat Karega (associate director, 2000) directed by Kundan Shah
- Scotland Express directed by Chinmay Purohit (writer)
- Yes Boss (film) (assistant director, 1997) directed by Aziz Mirza

== Television serials ==
- Naya Nukkad directed by Manjul Sinha, Aziz Mirza
- Filmi Chakkar directed by Ashok Pandit
- Aahat directed by B.P. Singh
- CID (Indian TV series) directed by B.P.Singh
- Dahashat directed by Santram Verma
- Woh directed by Glen, Ankush
- Kya Hadsa Kya haqiqat Balaji Telefilms
- Karma Balaji Telefilms
- Kasauti Zindagi Ki Balaji Telefilms
- X-zone
- Ssshhhh...Koi Hai
- Hello Inspector
- Lunatic directed by Sanjay Khanduri
- Gudgudee
- Hasaratein
- Raat hone ko hai
- Khauff
- Rooh
- Kahi Door Le Chalo
- Ruby Duby Hub Dub
- Koi Khiladi Koi Anadi

== Plays ==
- Andha yug
- Chehare
- Kahan ho Phakir Chand
- Sugandhi
- Chal ud jaa re paanchi
- Mahaakaal
- Aswatthamaa
- Adipashya

== Directed plays ==
- The Search
- Mahakaal
- Mrigtishna
- Mariamma
- Anteya
- Chal ud jaa re panchi
- Shunyatun Shunyat
- Teenagers Dream
- Khel
- Teen Ekke
- Jhootam A 1 Sundaram
- Cat Cat Category
- Aambaa
- Tim tim karte tare

== Directed serials, short films and documentaries ==
- Phool Aur Patthar [serial]
- Anhonee [serial]
- Akaash Pankh [serial]
- Chotishi Baat [promotional Film]
- The Premonition [short film]
- Lapun Chapun [music video]
- Chill [video film]
- Bol ri Kathputli [short film]
- The City [film]
- Tuzha ni Maajha Ghar Shrimantaacha [ creative head]
- Bapacha Baap Jhaala [music video]
- Condemn it [social film]
- Kakphony [short film]
- Papa [telefilm]
- Hogi Salman ki Shaadi [music video]
