= Ashraful Haque =

Ashraful Haque may refer to:

- Ashraful Haque (cricketer)
- Ashraful Haque (actor)
- Ashraful Haque (botanist)
