= Manish Naggdev =

Indian television actor (born 1984)

- Born: 24 September 1984 (age 42); Mumbai, India
- Known for: Begusarai; Banoo Main Teri Dulhann; Udaan
- Spouse: Malika Juneja (m. 2022)
- Relatives: Akanksha Juneja (sister-in-law)

Manish Naggdev is an Indian television actor.

He is known for portraying Chinu in Banoo Main Teri Dulhann and Adarsh Thakur in Begusarai. In 2018, he starred as Aakash in Udaan.

== Early life ==
Manish was born to Sadna Naggdev in Mumbai, India. He has a younger sister, Kiran Naggdev.

== Career ==
Naggdev started his television career in 2007, when he booked the recurring role of Chinu in Banoo Main Teri Dulhann. That year, he also starred in Santaan as Nishant. In 2013, he joined Pavitra Rishta and appeared in an episode of Savdhaan India. In 2018, he appeared as a guest on Bigg Boss season 12 and was cast in the Colors TV show Udaan as Akash, a negative character.

== Personal life ==
Naggdev got engaged to his girlfriend, Malika Juneja, on 8 June 2022. They married in the same year on 14 October.

== Filmography ==
=== Television work and films ===
- 2007–09 Banoo Main Teri Dulhann as Cheenu
- 2007–09 Santaan as Nishant
- 2008 Sapna Babul ka… Bidaai as Shishir
- 2008–09 Hum Ladkiyan as Alap
- 2009–10 Rehna Hai Teri Palkon Ki Chhaon Mein as Tanmay
- 2010–11 Geet – Hui Sabse Parayi as Gurvinder
- 2010–11 Dil Se Diya Vachan as Mayank
- 2012 Madhubala – Ek Ishq Ek Junoon as Mukund Dixit
- 2013 Savdhaan India
- 2013–14 Pavitra Rishta as Shashank Kamble
- 2014–15 Box Cricket League as contestant
- 2016 Begusarai as Adarsh Thakur
- 2018 Bigg Boss 12 as a guest
- 2018–19 Udaan as Aakash
- 2019 The Gift – Short Film as Sid
- 2020 Wish You Were Here – Webisodes
- 2021 Main Tujhmain – music video
- 2022 Cyber Vaar
- 2023 Swaraj as a ChandraShekar Azad (episode 63–67)
- 2024 – present Anupamaa as Paritosh “Toshu” Shah

== Awards ==
Year	Award	Category	Show	Result
2007	Zee Rishtey Awards	Favorite Bhabhi-Dever Rishta (with Divyanka Tripathi)	Banoo Main Teri Dulhann	Won
