= Nandini Singh =

Indian television and film actress (born 1980)

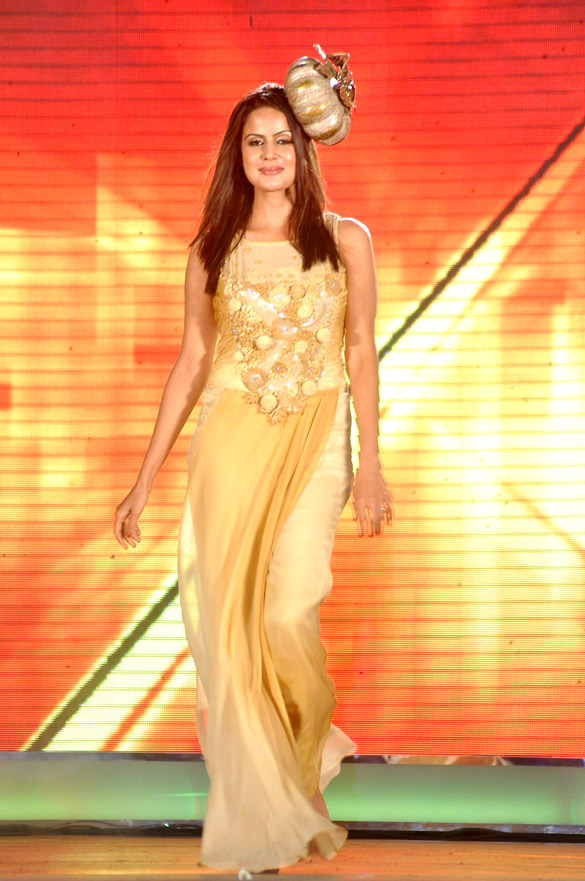
- Nandini at the Girl Child Cause Fashion Show, 2012
- Born: 7 August 1980 (age 45); Lucknow, Uttar Pradesh, India
- Occupations: Actress, Model
- Years active: 1986 - 2014

Nandini Singh (born 7 August 1980) is an Indian actress who has worked in Hindi films and television. Nandini began her career as a child artist in the film Jumbish in 1986 at the age of six, she worked in Ek Aur Ek Gyarah (2003). She shot to fame as Kesar in Ekta Kapoor's popular hit series Kesar, that aired from 2004 to 2007 on Star Plus and another of Ekta Kapoor's Indian soap operas, Kkavyanjali (2005). She also appeared in a music video, "Dekha Hai Teri Aankhon Ko" by Aryans. The most recent appearance of the actress was in the movie Titoo MBA, released in 2015 as the writer Simran. She has also worked in an episode of Savdhan India.

== Television ==
- Kesar as Kesar Mallya
- Kkavyanjali as Pammi Mittal
- Adaalat (TV Series) - (i) Kissa C.M. Ki Secret List Ka: Part 1 & 2 Episode no. 47/48 (2011) as Meghla Gupta. (ii) Qatil Billi Episode no. 85 (2011) as Kavya. (iii) Vishkanya Part 1 & 2 Episode no. 176/177 (2012) as Sukanya Amrish Goel. (iv) Khwab Mein Hatya: Part 1 & 2 Episode no. 207/208 (2013) as Madhura Shroff.
- Begusarai as Shravani
- Savdhaan India – Kiran (Episode No 751) / Kamini (Episode No 891) / Vaishali (Episode No 1290)
- Code Red Talaash (2015) ... Aaliya
- Crime Alert - Belagam Biwi as Sontara (Episode 136)

== Music videos ==
- "Woh Dheere Dheere Mere Dil Mein" (Album - Tere Bina) (2003)
- "Dekha Hai Teri Aankhon Ko" (Aryans) (2002)

== Films ==
- Ek Aur Ek Gyarah (2003) as Pinky
- Kuch Dil Ne Kaha
- Lo Main Aagayaa
- Titoo MBA (2014) as the novel writer Simran
