= Kiran Dubey =

Indian actress

Kiran Dubey (née Smita Dubey, in Gorakhpur) is an Indian television and film actress, best known for her supporting roles in the Hindi soap operas Kahaani Ghar Ghar Kii, Kyunki Saas Bhi Kabhi Bahu Thi, Jassi Jaissi Koi Nahin, and Babul Ka Aangann Chootey Na.

== Education and career ==
Raised in Dehradun, Dubey began participating in beauty pageants while in college in Pune, competing for Miss Pune in 1994, before making her television debut on the Zee TV series Sansar in 2001. A graduate of Fergusson College in Pune and a follower of Osho, she quit mainstream Indian television in 2009, and went on to study at the New York Film Academy, returning to television for her former role on the show Jet Set Go in 2013.

== Awards ==
Dubey later starred in and co-produced the docu-mystery film Where Is She Now? (2015), for which she won the Best Feature Documentary and Best New Genre Film awards at the World Music & Independent Film Festival as a co-producer of the film in 2016. She further won the Best Actress award at the Hollywood Film Competition in 2017, and was nominated as a supporting actress and as a producer for the film at the Idyllwild International Festival of Cinema in 2017.
