= Zaban Sambhal Ke =

Mini Web Series

- Genre: sitcom
- Created by: Rajiv Mehra
- Developed by: Ekta Kapoor
- Written by: Raj Vasant; Yogesh Mehra
- Directed by: Rajiv Mehra
- Creative directors: Riddhi Sharma; Nimisha Pandey
- Starring: see below
- Composer: Ashish Rego
- Country of origin: India
- Original language: Hindi
- No. of seasons: 1
- No. of episodes: 3

Production
- Executive producers: Aloke Gupta; Umesh Mishra; Rajesh Mehra; Rajiv Mehra
- Producer: Dheeraj Dhoopar
- Editors: Ashok. M. Rathod; Ajay. A. Kumar
- Camera setup: Multi-camera
- Running time: 18-23 minutes
- Production company: Eagle Films Pvt Ltd.

Original release
- Network: ALTBalaji
- Release: 19 October 2018

Related
- Zabaan Sambhalke

Zaban Sambhal Ke is a 2018 Hindi web series sitcom created by Rajiv Mehra for Ekta Kapoor's video on demand platform ALTBalaji. The series stars Sumeet Raghvan as the protagonist who is the head master of Hindi speaking institute. The idea for the plot has been taken from Mind Your Language, the British sitcom from the late '70s. The series revolves around the hilarious miscommunication between the students due to language barriers.

== Plot ==
The comedy series centres on a Hindi-learning class which has students from different nationalities and ethnicities.

== Cast ==
- Sumeet Raghavan as Mohan Bharti, Professor of Hindi at NIL i.e National Institute of Languages
- Shoma Anand as Ms. Diwan, Principal of NIL
- Tanu Khan as Tara Parker, a former porn star from Los Angeles, USA
- Bakhtiyaar Irani as Perzin, a Parsi middle-aged bachelor
- Ashwin Mushran as Sheikh Al Fukar, an Arabian oil businessman
- Rupali Bhosale as Paro, a fish seller from Maharashtra
- Pipa Hughes as Jennifer, a social worker from France
- Mishka Sharma as Lin Dolo, from Aizawl, Mizoram
- Hemant Kumar as Balwant, a wrestler from Harayana
- Bhawsheel Singh Sahni as Money Singh, a Punjabi rapper
- Jimmy Moses as PMS, an MLA from Chennai who wants to become Prime Minister
- Meenakshi Chand as Rimjhim, a Bhojpuri actress
- Nyra Banerjee as Bela Bose, Receptionist and Ms. Diwan's Secretary at NIL
- Rakesh Shrivastav as Pandey, Peon at NIL

== Reception ==
Biswadeep Ghosh of National Herald wrote, "It is impossible to understand why ALTBalaji chose to produce a pathetic remake of the 1990s classic Zabaan Sambhal Ke. Each actor seems uninspired, apart from Sumeet Raghavan who is occasionally tolerable as the Hindi instructor teaching a motley group of students. The liberal use of double entendre is one of the dubious hallmarks of the script, which has nothing in common with the original barring the basic idea."
