= Vishnu Sharma =

Ancient Indian writer

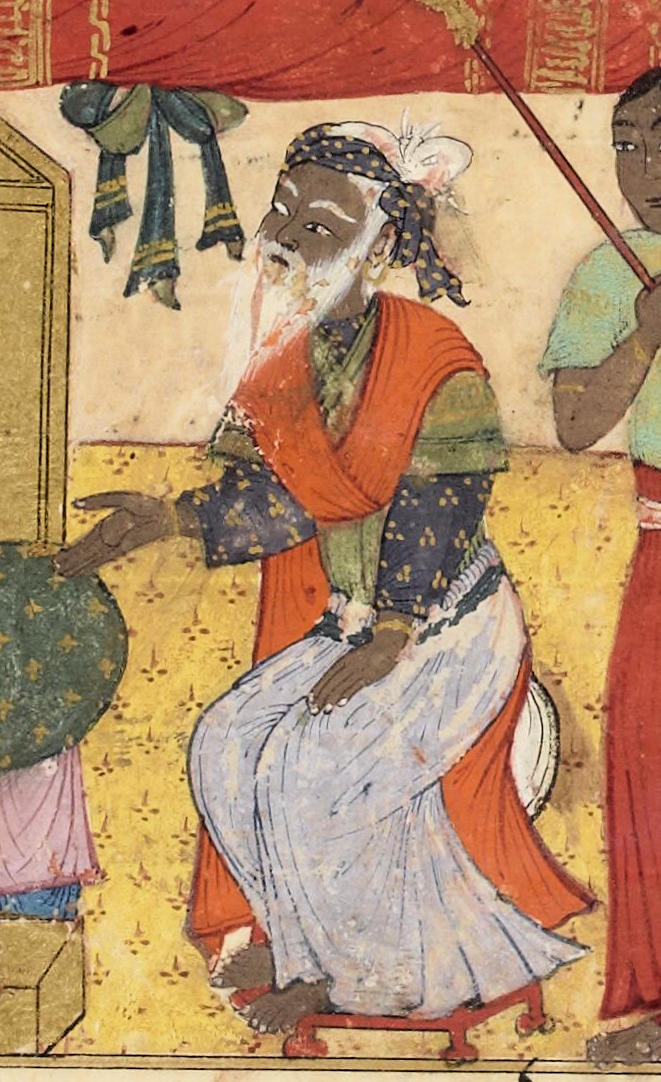
- The Brahman Bidpai (Vishnu Sharma, in a conversation with the Raja of India).
- Occupations: Writer; teacher; scholar
- Writing career
- Language: Sanskrit
- Genre: Fable
- Notable work: Panchatantra

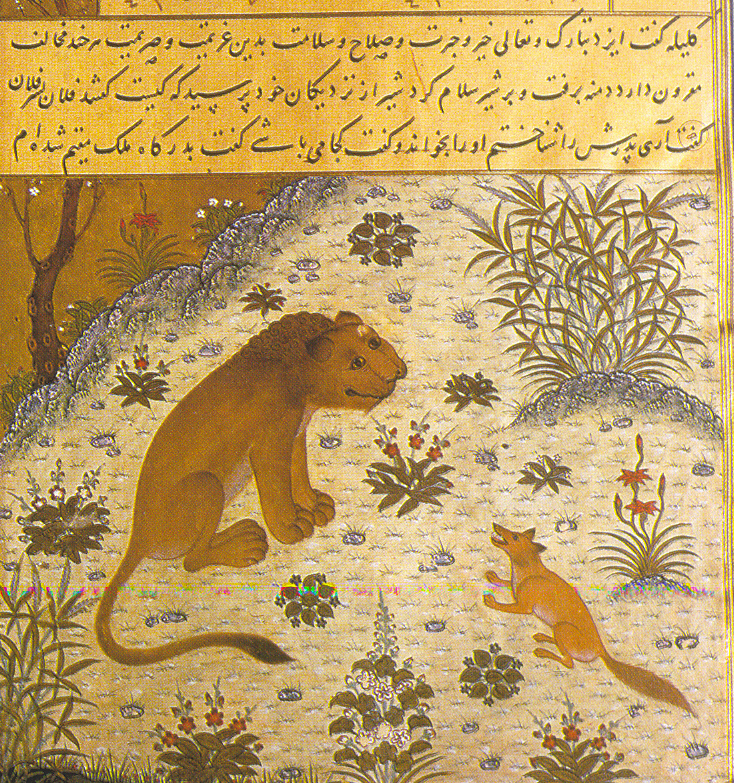
A page from Kelileh o Demneh dated 1429, from Herat, a Persian translation of the Panchatantra derived from the Arabic version – Kalila wa Dimna – depicts the manipulative jackal-vizier, Dimna, trying to lead his lion-king into war.

Vishnu Sharma (Sanskrit: विष्णुशर्मन् / विष्णुशर्मा; Viṣṇuśarman) was an Indian scholar and author who wrote the Panchatantra, a collection of fables. In the west, he has often been called "Pilpay" or "Bidpay", meaning "court scholar" in Sanskrit.

== Works ==
Panchatantra is one of the most widely translated non-religious books in history. The Panchatantra was translated into Middle Persian/Pahlavi in 570 CE by Borzūya and into Arabic in 750 CE by Persian scholar Abdullah Ibn al-Muqaffa as Kalīlah wa Dimnah (Arabic: كليلة و دمنة). In Baghdad, the translation commissioned by Al-Mansur, the second Abbasid Caliph, is claimed to have become "second only to the Qu'ran in popularity." "As early as the eleventh century this work reached Europe, and before 1600 it existed in Greek, Latin, Spanish, Italian, German, English, Old Slavonic, Czech, and perhaps other Slavonic languages. Its range has extended from Java to Iceland." In France, "at least eleven Panchatantra tales are included in the work of Jean de La Fontaine."

== Legend ==
The prelude to the Panchatantra identifies Vishnu Sharma as the author of the work. Since there is no other independent external evidence about him, "it is impossible to say whether he was the historical author . . .or is himself a literary invention". Based on analysis of various Indian recensions and the geographical features and animals described in the stories, Kashmir is suggested to be his birthplace by various scholars.

He has also been associated with the University of Taxila.

The prelude narrates the story of how Vishnu Sharma supposedly created the 'Panchatantra'. There was a king called Amarshakti who ruled a kingdom, whose capital was a city called Mahilaropya (महिलारोप्य), whose location on the current map of India is unknown. The king had three sons named Bahushakti, Ugrashakti and Anantshakti. Though the king himself was both a scholar and a powerful ruler, his sons were "all dullards." The king despaired of his three princes' inability to learn, and approached his ministers for counsel. They presented him with conflicting advice, but the words of one, called Sumati, rang true to the king. He said that the sciences, politics and diplomacy were limitless disciplines that took a lifetime to master formally. Instead of teaching the princes scriptures and texts, they should somehow be taught the wisdom inherent in them, and the aged scholar Vishnu Sharma was the man to do it.

Vishnu Sharma was invited to the court, where the king offered him a hundred land grants if he could teach the princes. Vishnu Sharma declined the promised award, saying he did not sell knowledge for money, but accepted the task of making the princes wise to the ways of politics and leadership within six months. Vishnu Sharma knew that he could never instruct these three students through conventional means. He had to employ a less orthodox way, and that was to tell a succession of animal fables – one weaving into another – that imparted to them the wisdom they required to succeed their father. Adapting stories that had been told for thousands of years in India, panchatantra was composed into an entertaining five part work to communicate the essence of diplomacy, relationships, politics and administration to the princes. These five discourses — titled "The Loss of Friends", "The Winning of Friends", "Of Crows and Owls", "Loss of Gains" and "Imprudence" — became the Panchatantra, meaning the five (pancha) treatises (tantra).
