= Chandrakanta =

Chandrakanta may refer to:

- Chandrakanta (novel), a 19th-century Hindi-language novel by Indian writer Devaki Nandan Khatri, and its titular heroine
  - Chandrakanta Santati, a series of sequel novels revolving around Chandrakanta and its other main characters by Devaki Nandan Khatri
  - Chandrakanta (film), a 1956 Indian Hindi-language fantasy film by G. P. Sippy, based on the novel
  - Chandrakanta (1994 TV series), a 1994 Indian television series based on the novel
  - Kahani Chandrakanta Ki, a 2011 Indian TV series based on the novel
  - Chandrakanta (2017 TV series), a 2017 Indian television serial based on the novel, produced by Ekta Kapoor
  - Prem Ya Paheli – Chandrakanta, a 2017 Indian TV series based on the novel
- Detective Chandrakanta, a fictional Indian detective played by Chiranjeet Chakraborty in the films Shororipu (2016) and Shororipu 2: Jotugriho (2021)
- Chandrakanta (author) (born 1938), Indian novelist and short-story writer
- Chandrakanta Goyal (1932–2020), Indian politician
- Chandrakanta Singha or Sudingphaa, 19th-century ruler of the Ahom Kingdom in India

== See also ==
- Chandrakant, an Indian male given name
- Chandrakanti, an Oriya dessert of green gram, rice flour, sugar, and ghee
- Chandrakanta Abhidhan, an Assamese-language dictionary
- Chandrakantha, a 1936 Indian Tamil-language film by P. K. Raja Sandow
- Chandrakantham, a 1974 Indian film
- Major Chandrakanth (disambiguation)
