= Umro Ayyar =

- First appearance: Hamzanama

In-universe information
- Nickname: Umro
- Gender: Male
- Weapon: Suleimani

Umro Ayyar or Amar Ayyar is a fictional character, an ayyār, (Note: A class warriors and outlaws in the medieval Islamic world.) in Tilism-e-Hoshruba, an Urdu recension of the Islamic epic Hamzanama (originally in Persian). He was first written about during the time of Mughal Emperor Akbar and many stories and novels have been written about him since.

Modern Urdu authors like Zaheer Ahmed, Mazhar Kaleem, Safdar Shaheen and Akhter Rizvi have written various different stories about the character.

== Summary ==
Umro Ayyar is a thief and the most famous character of the Hamzanama after Amir Hamza, the titular hero of the epic. He is known for his guile and thievery in the city 'Tilism-e-Hoshruba'. His life is full of adventure. It is his habit to travel around the world and take on evils and bad spirits. Umro has a magical zambeel (bag) from which he can extract whatever he wants. He mostly uses it to show off and to kill evil. He steals from the rich and gives to the poor.

== Legacy ==
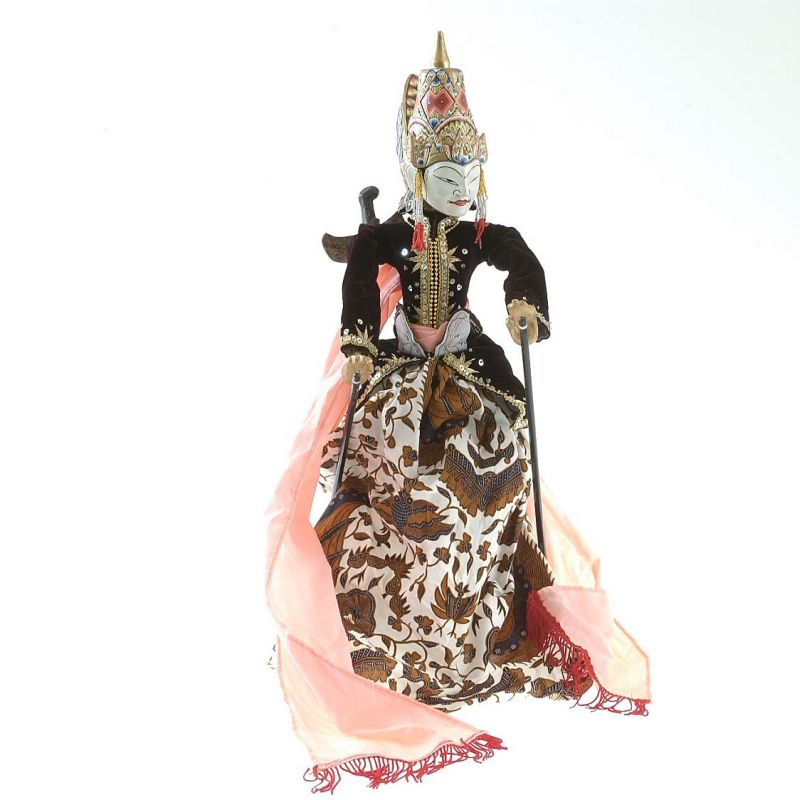
An Indonesian wayang puppet of Amir Hamzah, also known as Wong Agung Jayeng Rana

The immense popularity of the dastan had a long-lasting effect on other forms of fictional narratives. The earliest novels in Urdu as well as Hindi often seem nothing more than simplified or bowdlerized forms of Dastans. Babu Devaki Nandan Khatri's Chandrakanta and Chandrakanta Santati and Ratan Nath Dhar Sarshar's Fasana-e-Azad are only the two most stellar examples of this genre. Chandrakanta bears the direct influence of dastans as witnessed in the case of eponymous protagonist Chandrakanta who is trapped in a tilism and the presence of notable ayyars. The dastan also influenced Munshi Premchand (1880-1936) who was fascinated and later on inspired by the stories of Tilism-e Hoshruba that he heard at the tobacconist shop in his childhood days. The conventions of the dastan narrative also conditioned Urdu theatre: the trickster Ayyar, permanent friend of Hamza provided the convention of the hero's [comic] sidekick that achieved culmination in the Hindi cinema of the sixties.

The story is also performed in Indonesian puppet theatre, where it is called Wayang Menak. Here, Hamza is also known as Wong Agung Jayeng Rana or Amir Ambyah.

Frances Pritchett's former student at Columbia University, Pasha Mohamad Khan, who currently teaches at McGill University, researches qissa/dastan (romances) and the art of dastan-goi (storytelling), including the Hamzanama.

== In fiction ==
=== Films ===
Film	Director	Played by
Chandrakanta (1956)	G. P. Sippy	
Umro Ayyar - A New Beginning (2024)	Azfar Jafri	Usman Mukhtar
Taalismaan (unreleased)	Ram Madhvani	Amitabh Bachchan

=== Animated films ===
Film	Director	Played by
The Chronicles of Umro Ayyar (unreleased)	Syed Arsalan Ali; Haris Basharat	Afraz Rasool

=== Dramas ===
Drama	Writer	Played by
Ainak Wala Jin (1993)	Abdul Hameed	Nisar Butt
Chandrakanta (1994)	Devaki Nandan Khatri	Brahmachari
Kahani Chandrakanta Ki (2011)	Shrikant Vishvakarma	Sparsh Sharma
Chandrakanta (2017)	Devaki Nandan Khatri; Ekta Kapoor	Punit Talreja
Prem Ya Paheli – Chandrakanta (2017)	Devaki Nandan Khatri	Chandan K Anand

=== Other books ===
No.	Book	Writer(s)	Publisher
1	Hamzanama	Ghalib Lakhnavi	Modern Library
2	Chandrakanta	Devaki Nandan Khatri	Lehri Book Depot
3	Umru Ayar (comic series)	Hasan Ansari	Kachee Goliyan
4	Tilism-e-Hoshruba	Shahnaz Aijazuddin	Penguin Books Ltd
5	Hoshruba: The Land and the Tilism	Musharraf Ali Farooqi	Penguin Random House Pvt. Ltd
