= Mathanavelu Pillai =

Indian playwright, actor and producer

Thiruchirapalli Mathanavelu Pillai
- Born: 1906; Thiruchirapalli, Tamil Nadu
- Died: 1971
- Years active: 1930–1959
- Spouse: Jeyaletchumi Thiruchirapalli Ponnusamy Pillai
- Children: TP Subramaniam & Devi Maniam
- Parent: Maruthaiya Pillai

Mathanavelu Pillai (1906-1971) was an Indian playwright, actor and producer in Malaysia and Singapore.

Pillai is recognized as a pioneer of the Tamil theatre arts by the Indian Heritage Board due to his contributions to the Tamil theater in Singapore and Malaya in the 1930s-1950s. He acted, wrote plays, and staged over 60 productions for Tamil audiences. Pillai helped preserve Tamil culture and language during the colonial era, the Japanese Occupation and the post Japanese period.

== Early life ==
Thiruchirappalli Mathanavelu Pillai was born to Thiruchirappalli Maruthaiya Pillai in 1906 in Tiruchirappalli, British India into a landlord's family that owned agricultural lands. He lost his parents at a young age and was left in the care of his sister.

At age 9, when his sister was betrothed, Pillai was enrolled in a touring street theatre company. He received formal training in acting, dancing, singing Carnatic music, playing Indian instruments such as the harmonium, kanjira and the morsing. Later he joined the Kathar Batcha Drama Troupe where he learnt to engineer the mechanics of grandeur props and sets. He also trained in the Indian martial arts silambatam, a mandatory exercise that served dual purposes such as to portray some of the characters in the battle scenes, por kala koothu. and to protect the camp site of the touring drama troupe, during their travels.

Pillai arrived in Malaya-Singapore in 1925 with the Troupe. The decision to stay in Malaya marked the beginning of his extensive theatrical career.

=== Family ===
Pillai married Jeyaletchumi Thiruchirappalli Ponnusamy Pillai in Malaya-Singapore. She was known as Jeyamani by the British. She was the main liaison officer for their company with the British plantation owners due to her proficiency in the language. She also managed the costume and make up matters for the productions and acted in a few stage productions. Jeyamani also provided first aid to the company as she was from a family of Ayurvedic practitioners and healers. The couple had an elder son, T. P. Subramaniam and a younger daughter, T. P. Devaki. Pillai named the Devaki Dramatic Troupe. after his daughter. When Pillai retired, Devaki who was married by then was referred to as Devi Maniam and succeeded him as owner of what was now Devi Productions.

== Theatrical career ==
Pillai acted, scripted his dramas, managed and staged several street theatre or terukkuttu. Terukkuttu. and later contemporary drama productions, under his Devaki Dramatic Troupe in Singapore and Malaya between the pre-Japanese Occupation years, 1925 to 1959 as documented in the commendation letters that were issued by the British, handbills, drama posters and other memorabilia over a period of 28 years of service to the theatre arts with an inclination towards contemporary dramas during the post-colonial years. Pillai was also invited to play the harmonium or manage productions for aspiring companies due to his versatility in theatre arts.

=== Plays and performances ===
Pillai was an avid reader and an enthused playwright, who dramatized Hindu epics and characters of Vedic puranas, famous Indian folklores told as early as the 12th century for his drama productions. Some of these tales and biographical characters were adapted and expanded from other non-Tamil Indian literature and novels for stage presentations such as Chandrakanta a literature adaptation from an 1888 fantasy novel written in Hindi by Devaki Nandan Khatri.

Pillai's plays were staged on temporary proscenium stages in the rubber and coconut estates throughout 1930s-1950s, which were set up prior the performances and dismantled after the last show. Earlier all the roles were played by men who had good performing skills and rendered the story through dialogues, soliloquy, singing and dancing and assuming female roles as per tradition. The performances only started late in the evenings around 9.00pm and ended wee hours in the morning. And due to his vast musical knowledge, it was common for some of his musical compositions to be set according to the music tradition of composing music pieces based on ragas corresponding to the time, season and emotions (navarasas) whenever possible.

A distinct signature of Mathaavelu Pillai's productions was that at the beginning of the play all the actors enter the stage singing, which not only gave a preview of the cast but also created a visual spectacle of the costumes adorned and the scenes and sets under the gas lights and fire torches lit along the performing arena. He had staged and performed as the Rajapart (lead protagonist of the play) and Kattiyangaaran (The storyteller who introduces the play) and as a lead vocalist and instrumentalist (harmonium player) in various genres:

Religious tales - Alli-Arjuna., Valli Thirumanam, Bama Vijayam, Nanthnar, Dhurva Sarithram, Ramayanam, Skanda Leela, Kaalava Rishi, Lanka Thaganam, Krishna Leela, Mayil Ravanan, Dasavatharam, Vishnu Leela, Lava Kusa, Dropathai, Arjunan Thabasu, Sri Valli, Markandeyar, Indra Sabha, Vasthirabaranam,

Folklore / Literature / Historical – Rani Lalithangi, Pavalakodi, Kovalan, Mayana Kandam-Harichandran, Kalidas, Sakunthala, Sathyavan Savithri, Sataram, Baktha Ramdas, Mani Maligai, Haridas, Raja Raja Cholan., Ambigapathi, Ali Badusha, Kandi Raja, Desingu Raja, Madurai Veeran, Athiroopa Amaravathi, Sathi Sulochana, Jida Manthiri

Fantasy – Alavuddin, Kulei Bagavali, Chandra Kantha,

Nationalistic themed dramas (1942) – Baratham, Desiya Kodi

Modernism / Contemporary – Thooku thooki, Rajisha Nadasha, Raja Boss, Boologa Rambai, Bombay Mail, Vidhi, Yen Thangai, Parasakthi, Thuli Visham, Gnana Sundari, Pathi Bakthi, Nalla Thangaal, Leelavathi, Inba Kanavu

During the Japanese invasion in 1942, Pillai staged nationalistic dramas to convey Gandhi’s independence movement messages of Indian self-rule to the Tamils in Malaya –Singapore who were widely affected by the political changes in India. Thus he used drama as a tool to bridge nationalistic sentiments and also bring home closer to the Tamils.

In the 1950s, the gradual shift in the educational, social and economic status of the local Tamil speaking Indians led to the inclusion of appreciation for contemporary dramas widely together with traditional themed dramas in designated drama theatres such as Victoria theatre and New theatre and not in makeshift proscenium stages where audiences sat on the ground or less apt badminton hall. Although shows were ticketed at affordable prices, there are complimentary counterfoils that show that those who could not afford were issued complimentary tickets to enjoy the theatre arts.

Although the traditional street theatre consisted of male actors, contemporary dramas in the late 1930s, included female artists in lead roles like Pillai's daughter, Devaki Mathanavelu Pillai.

== Accolades and written commendations ==
=== British commendation memorandums ===
Pillai received 14 commendation letters from the British over a period of 15 years from 1939 to 1954 for excellence in staging productions that were appreciated by the plantation estate workers. Among them, one commendation memorandum is written to appreciate his service in training 15 untrained young men and staging a play successfully.

=== Open Public Challenges Potta Potti ===
There were companies who had challenged Pillai, in harmonium playing challenges, which required opponents to create musical song pieces, as a rebuttal to the opponents piece which would contain a question or a challenge in the song. Defeat is accepted by the one who runs out of ideas to rebut the challenge, in front of a live audience. Pillai won medals. and defeated many companies who had challenged him. Eventually he found the challenges meaningless to prove his literacy in theatre arts, thus refrained in personally attending them and sent his senior student to attend to them.

== Charitable efforts ==
In aid of the Iqbal Men's Library, Pillai staged the drama, ‘Inba Kanavu’ and donated all the proceeds as charity.

Food was always served from Pillai's personal kitchen for all the actors out of goodwill. Even when the actors were not acting and were running low in funds, Pillai gave them food.

== Memorabilia Archival ==
Currently 41 items pertaining to Pillai are on loan to the Indian Heritage Centre in Singapore. National Heritage Board, Singapore. As a pioneer contributor to the arts in Singapore his medals. all the British commendation letters addressed to him, production posters, handbills, glass plate and his photographs are available for public viewing at the Indian Heritage Centre.
