= Akbar Hamzanama =

16th-century illustrated manuscript of Hamzanama

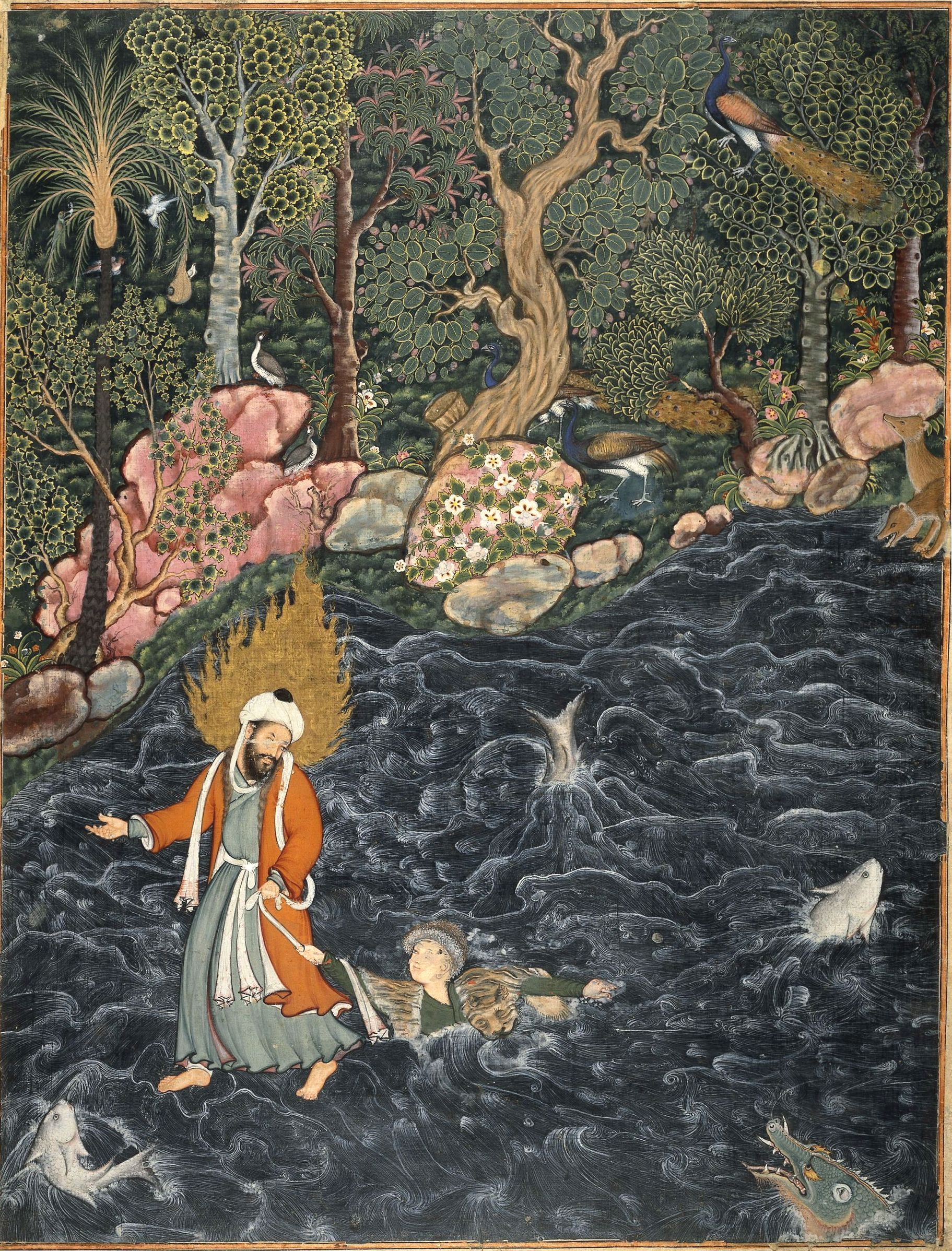
Mir Sayyid Ali, the prophet Elias (Elijah) rescuing Prince Nur ad-Dahr from drowning in a river, from the Akbar Hamzanama

The Akbar Hamzanama (also known as Akbar's Hamzanama) is an enormous illustrated manuscript, now fragmentary, of the Persian epic Hamzanama commissioned by the Mughal emperor Akbar around 1562.

== Origins ==
Though the first Mughal Emperor, Babur, described the Hamzanama as "one long far-fetched lie; opposed to sense and nature", his grandson Akbar, who came to the throne at the age of fourteen, greatly enjoyed it. He commissioned his court workshop to create an illustrated manuscript of the Hamzanama early in his reign (he was by then about twenty), which was conceived on such an unusually large scale that it took fourteen years, from about 1562 to 1577, to complete. As Akbar's court chronicler tells us, Hamza's adventures were "represented in twelve volumes, and clever painters made the most astonishing illustrations for no less than one thousand and four hundred passages of the story." The illustrated manuscript thus created became the supreme achievement of Mughal art: "of all the loot carried off from Delhi by Nadir Shah in 1739 (including the Peacock Throne), it was only the Hamza-nama, 'painted with images that defy the imagination,' that Emperor Muhammad Shah pleaded to have returned".

== Paintings ==
Apart from the text, the manuscript included 1400 full-page Mughal miniatures of an unusually large size, nearly all painted on tightly woven cotton cloth. The work was bound in 14 volumes. After the early pages, where various layouts were experimented with, one side of most folios has a painting, about 69 cm x 54 cm (approx. 27 x 20 inches) in size, done in a fusion of Persian and Mughal styles. On the other side is the text in Persian in Nasta'liq script, arranged so that the text is opposite the matching picture in most openings of the book.

The size of the commission was completely unprecedented, and stretched even the huge imperial workshop. According to contemporary accounts, about thirty main artists were used, and over a hundred men worked on the various aspects of the book in all. According to Badauni and Shahnawaz Khan the work of preparing the illustrations was supervised initially by Mir Sayyid Ali and subsequently by Abdus Samad, the former possibly being replaced as head of the workshop because the pace of production was too slow. After seven years only four volumes were completed, but the new head was able to galvanize production and complete the ten volumes in another seven years, without any loss of quality. Indeed, "the later pages are the most exciting and innovative in the work".

The colophon of this manuscript is still missing. None of the folios of this manuscript so far found is signed, though many have been attributed to different artists. Compared to Akbar's Tutinama, a smaller commission begun and completed while the Hamzanama commission was in progress, the manuscript shows a much greater fusion of the styles of Indian and Persian miniatures. Though the elegance and finish may seem closer to Persian works, the compositional style and narrative drama owe more to Indian tradition. Between them, these two manuscripts are the key works in the formation of the Mughal miniature style.

== Libraries and exhibitions ==
At some fairly early point, the manuscript became dispersed, and only a little over a hundred of the paintings survive. In 2009, the Museum of Applied Arts, Vienna organized the exhibition GLOBAL:LAB, Art as a Message. Asia and Europe 1500–1700, which showed its whole holding of the Hamzanama. Other recent exhibitions dedicated to the manuscript have been at the Victoria and Albert Museum in 2003 and in 2002/2003 at the Smithsonian in Washington D.C., which transferred to the Brooklyn Museum in New York.

Holdings of pages of the manuscript include:

- 61 in the Museum of Applied Arts, Vienna, acquired from the Persian government on the occasion of the 1873 Vienna World's Fair.
- 27 in the Victoria and Albert Museum, London, acquired from a shop in Kashmir in 1896 by Sir Caspar Purdon Clarke, a curator at the Museum.
- 5 in the Metropolitan Museum of Art in New York, acquired through three purchases around the beginning of the twentieth century.
- 4 in the Brooklyn Museum (24.46-49)
- 3 in the Ashmolean Museum in Oxford, on loan from Howard Hodgkin, one of which he acquired from Maria Sarre-Humann (LI118.1,2 & 100).
- Prince Qasim and the Champions of Iran and Turan, in the Los Angeles County Museum of Art (M.78.9.1), acquired in 1978 from the Nasli and Alice Heeramaneck Collection.
- The Battle of Mazandaran, in the Library of Congress in Washington D.C.
- The Prophet Elijah rescuing the nephew of Hamza, in the British Museum (ME OA 1925.9-29.01)
- Hamza burns the chest of Zarthust, in the David Collection in Copenhagen, acquired from the Chicago Art Institute in 1998.
- Four men in combat, in the Fralin Museum of Art (1999.19) since 1999.
- Qasam al-Abbas arrives from Mecca and crushes Tahmâsp with a mace, in the Philadelphia Museum of Art since 1937, acquired from the Brooklyn Museum (1937-4-1).
- Khwaja Umar escaping from the Murzuq camp, since 2004 at the Museum of Islamic Art, Doha (Ms.31.2004).
- 2 paintings in the Museum of Fine Arts, Boston (06.129 & 24.129).
- 1 painting in the National Gallery of Victoria in Melbourne (AS12-1978), since 1978.
- 1 painting in the Khalili Collection of Islamic Art.

== Example images ==
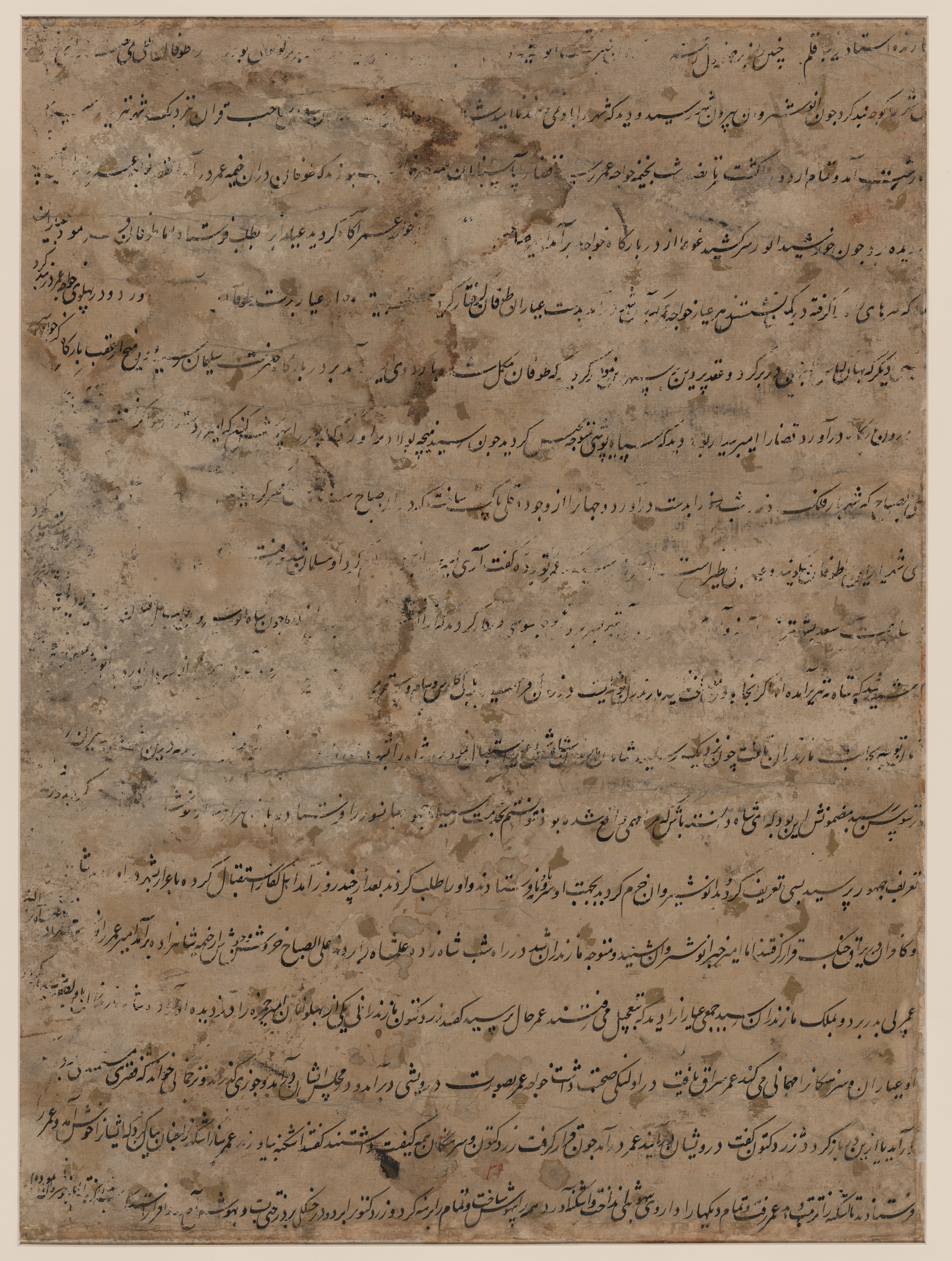
text on a verso (battle of Mazandaran)

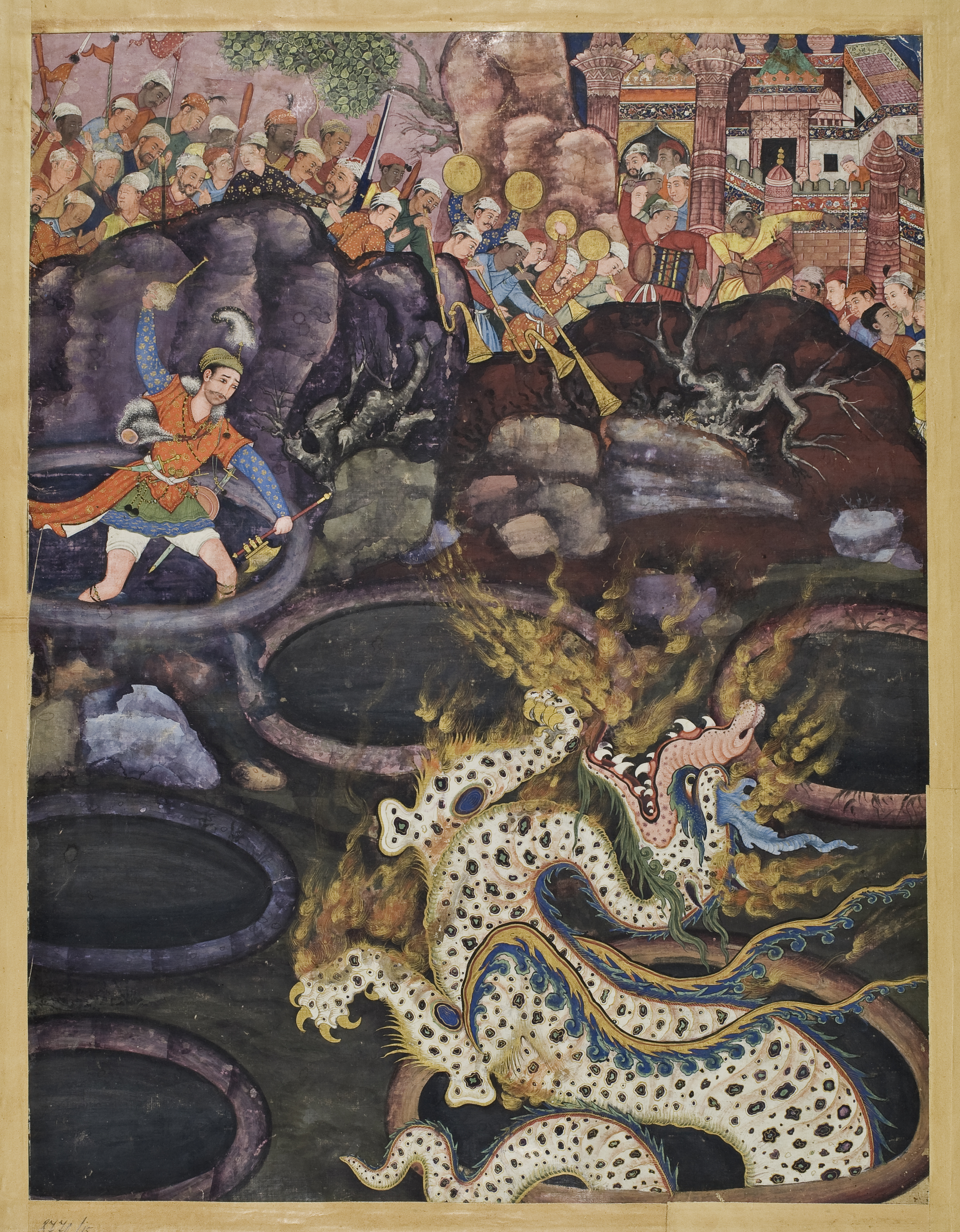
Umar Defeats a Dragon, Daswanth

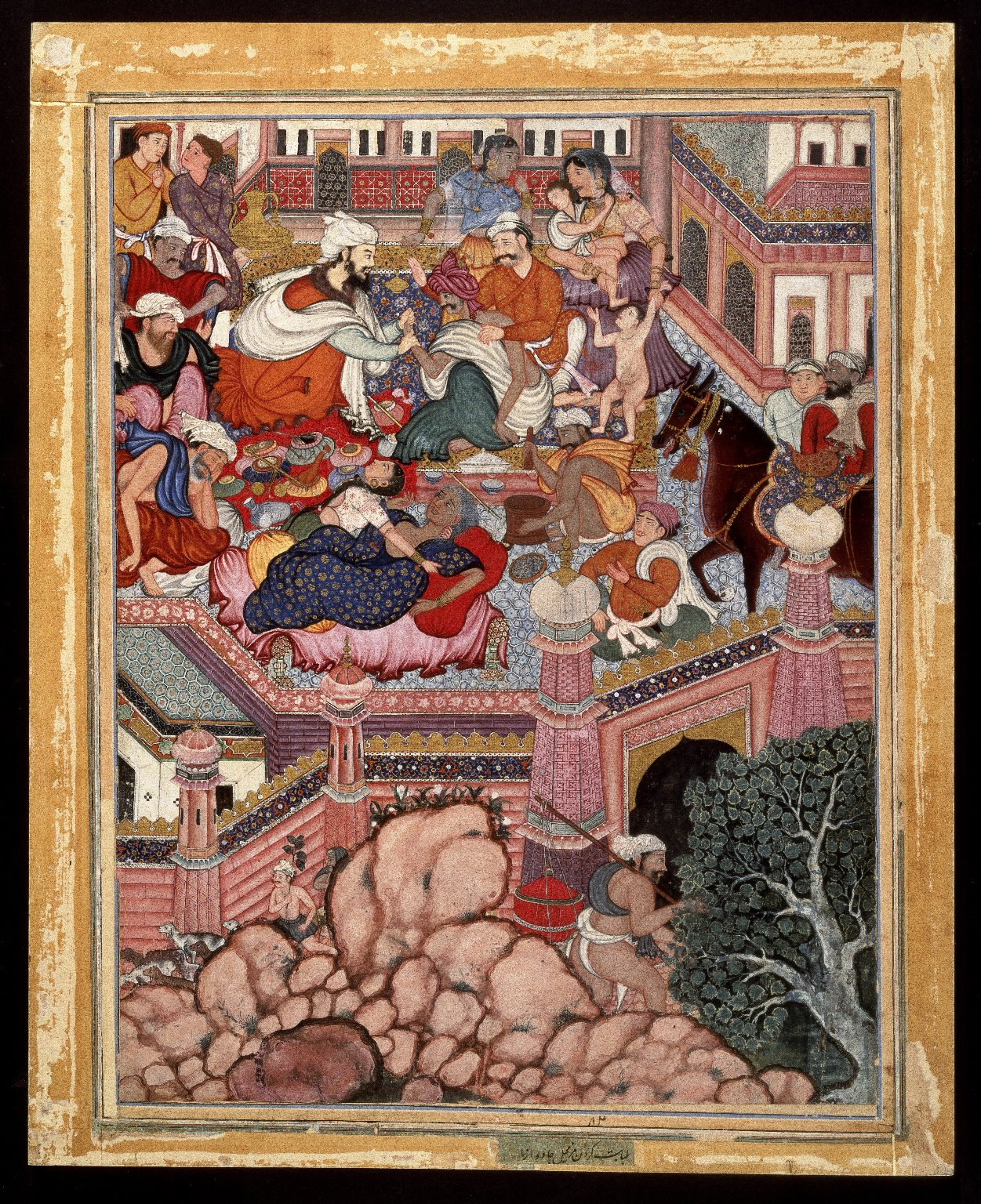
Umar, disguised as Mazmahil the Surgeon, practices quackery on the Sorcerers of Antali, c. 1570.

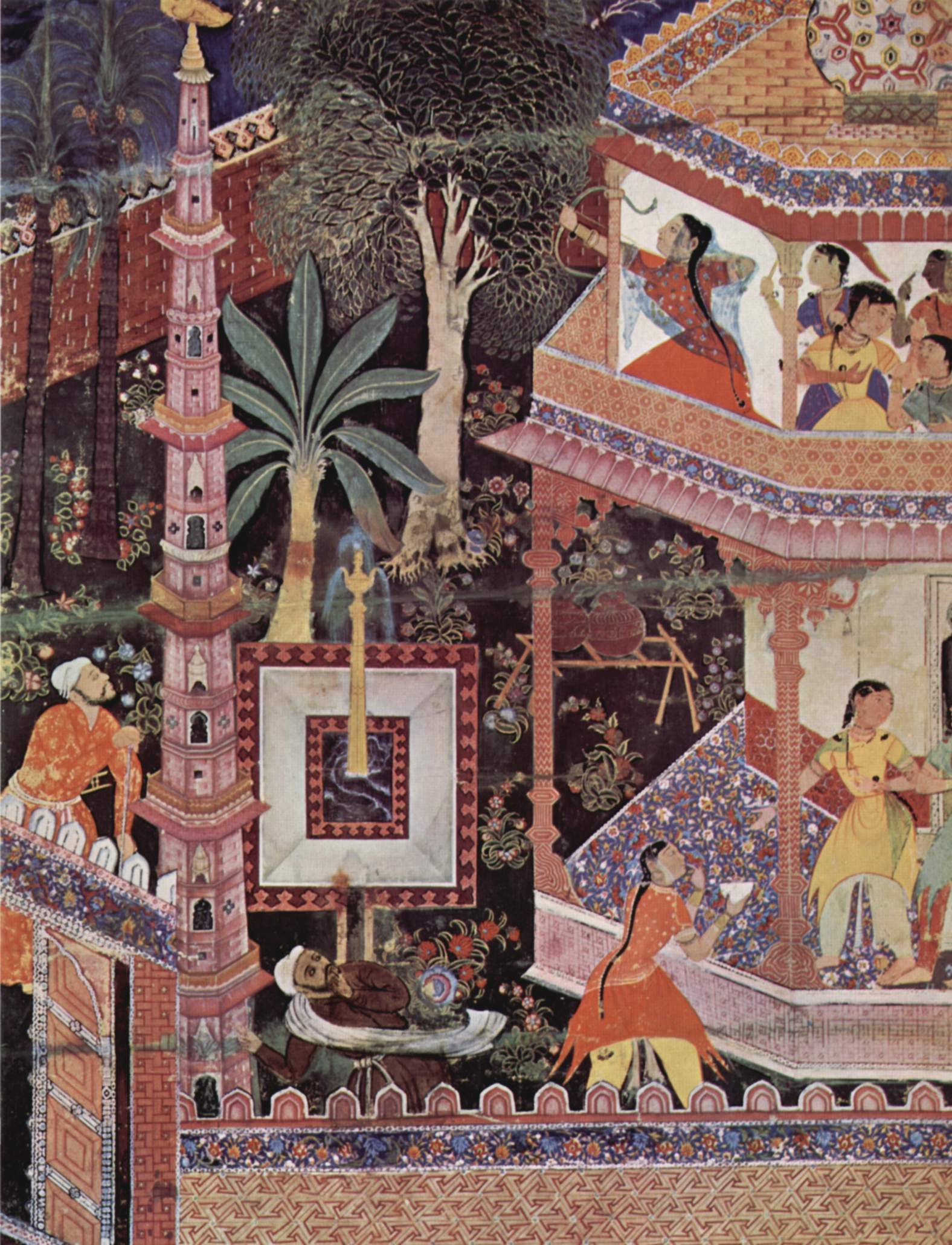
Mihrdukht shoots an arrow through the ring

== Sources ==
- Beach, Milo Cleveland, Early Mughal painting, Harvard University Press, 1987, ISBN 0-674-22185-0, ISBN 978-0-674-22185-7
- "Grove", Oxford Art Online, "Indian sub., §VI, 4(i): Mughal ptg styles, 16th–19th centuries", restricted access.
- Titley, Norah M., Persian Miniature Painting, and its Influence on the Art of Turkey and India, 1983, University of Texas Press, 0292764847
