= Chandrakant =

Chandrakant Nureti is a given name. Notable people with the name include:

- Chandrakant Bakshi, Gujarati author
- Murlidhar Chandrakant Bhandare (born 1928), Indian politician
- Chhagan Chandrakant Bhujbal (born 1947), politician from the state of Maharashtra, India
- Chandrakant Danve, Indian politician
- Nitin Chandrakant Desai, Indian art director, production designer of Indian cinema, film and television producer
- Chandrakant Gokhale (1921–2008), Marathi film and stage actor and singer
- Chandrakant Kamat (1933–2010), Hindustani classical tabla player of the Benares Tabla Gharana
- Chandrakant Kavlekar, Indian Politician from the state of Goa,
- Chandrakant Keni (1934–2009), Konkani language writer and journalist from Goa,
- Chandrakant Khaire (born 1952), Shiv Sena politician from Aurangabad district
- Chandrakant Kulkarni, Marathi theatre and film director, script writer and actor
- Chandrakant Lahariya, Indian medical doctor, writer and social innovator
- Chandrakant Limaye (born 1950), Hindustani Classical Singer from India
- Chandrakant Dadu Mali, Indian Weightlifter, who won bronze medal in the 2014 Commonwealth Games
- Chandrakant Mandare (1913–2001), Marathi film actor and artist
- Chandrakant Mokate, Indian politician and member of the Shiv Sena
- Chandrakant Pandit (born 1961), former Indian cricketer
- Chandrakant Patankar (born 1930), former Indian cricketer
- Chandrakant T. Patel, (1917–1990), cotton scientist, who developed Hybrid-4 (Sankar-4) in 1970
- Chandrakant Bacchu Patil, second term member of the Maharashtra Legislative Council
- Chandrakant Patil (1921–1985), 7th Lok Sabha member from Hingolias Janata Party Candidate
- Chandrakant Raghunath Patil, member of the 16th Lok Sabha of India
- Chandrakant Raut (born 1945), Indian cricketer
- Chandrakant Sakure (born 1990), Indian cricketer
- Chandrakant Sardeshmukh (1955–2011), Hindustani classical sitar player of the Maihar Gharana
- Chandrakant Shah, Canadian doctor, researcher and social activist
- Chandrakant Sheth, Gujarati language poet, essayist, critic, translator and compiler
- Chandrakant Singh (born 1974), Indian director and producer who has directed Hindi films such as Rama Rama Kya Hai Dramaaa
- Chandrakant Baliram Sonawane, member of the 13th Maharashtra Legislative Assembly
- Yashomati Chandrakant Thakur, member of the 13th Maharashtra Legislative Assembly
- Chandrakant Topiwala, Gujarati language poet and critic from Gujarat, India

== See also ==
- Chandrakant Chiplunkar Seedi Bambawala, Indian situational comedy television series that aired on SAB TV
- Chandrakanta (disambiguation)
- Chandrakantham
- Chandrakanti
- Chandran
