= Kavadh =

Kavadh (Middle Persian: kwʾt' Kawād; Persian: قباد Qobād; Latin: Cabades, Cavades) may refer to:

- Kay Kawād, mythological figure of Iranian folklore and oral tradition.
- Kavadh I, Sasanian king (r. 488–531)
- Kavadh II, Sasanian king (r. 628)
- Qubad Kamran, a character in the Hamzanama
