= Daswanth =

Mughal artist (1560–1584)

Daswanth or Dasavant (b. 1560 - d. 1584) was a Mughal-era painter in the service of the emperor Akbar.

== Life ==
While not much is known of his early life, it is known that he was Hindu, and the son of a palanquin-bearer. After Daswanth showed natural talent by painting and drawing on walls, the emperor learned of him, and he began to be taught by Khwāja 'Abd al-Samad, a Persian master painter. Abd al-Samad's work was fairly traditional and conservative.

Daswanth is referenced in the Ain-i-Akbari, a document recording the administration of the Mughal empire, as one of the top three most important artists in this period, and again in the Akbarnama, a book detailing the reign of Akbar, as having great artistic talent. In contrast to 'Abd al Samad, his works were imaginative and original.

His behavior was considered erratic in his life time and he wounded himself with a dagger in 1584 which ended his life.

== Works ==
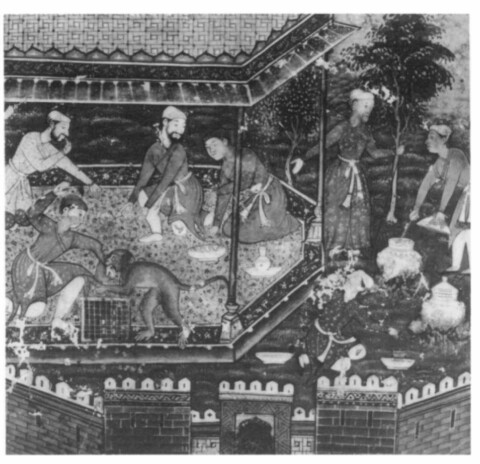
The wounded monkey bites prince from Tutinama.

Three illustrations of the Tūtīnāma ("Parrot Book") at the Cleveland Museum of Art have been attributed to him. Two works show partly damaged inscriptions naming him as the artist while a third work has been attributed to him. One of these works is titled the Wounded Monkey Bites the Hand of the Prince, and depicts the monkey's action and response of the prince and other subjects of the scene. His work had a technique of free application of wet pigment which was distinctive.

His next important artistic contribution was to the Hamzanama where he created multiple paintings, still under the guidance of 'Abd al Samad, and then a singular illustration in the Tarikh e Khandan e Timuriyah. It is suspected that he helped to prepare about 1,400 cloth paintings for the Dastan-i Amir Hamza and some embellishment on buildings in Agra and Fatehpur Sikri. It is difficult to find specific examples as only about 10% of the Hamza has survived to the present day.

=== The Razmnama ===
The largest collection of Daswanth's work is found in the Razmnama ("Book of wars"), which was a Persian translation of the Hindu epic the Mahabharata, between 1582-1586, and includes thirty illustrations. If not for his early death, he would have been the most prolific painter on this project which included Basawan, Makand, Kasu Das, Kanha, and Lal. Multiple scenes he drew were completed by Banwari and he was also assisted by Tulsi Kalan.

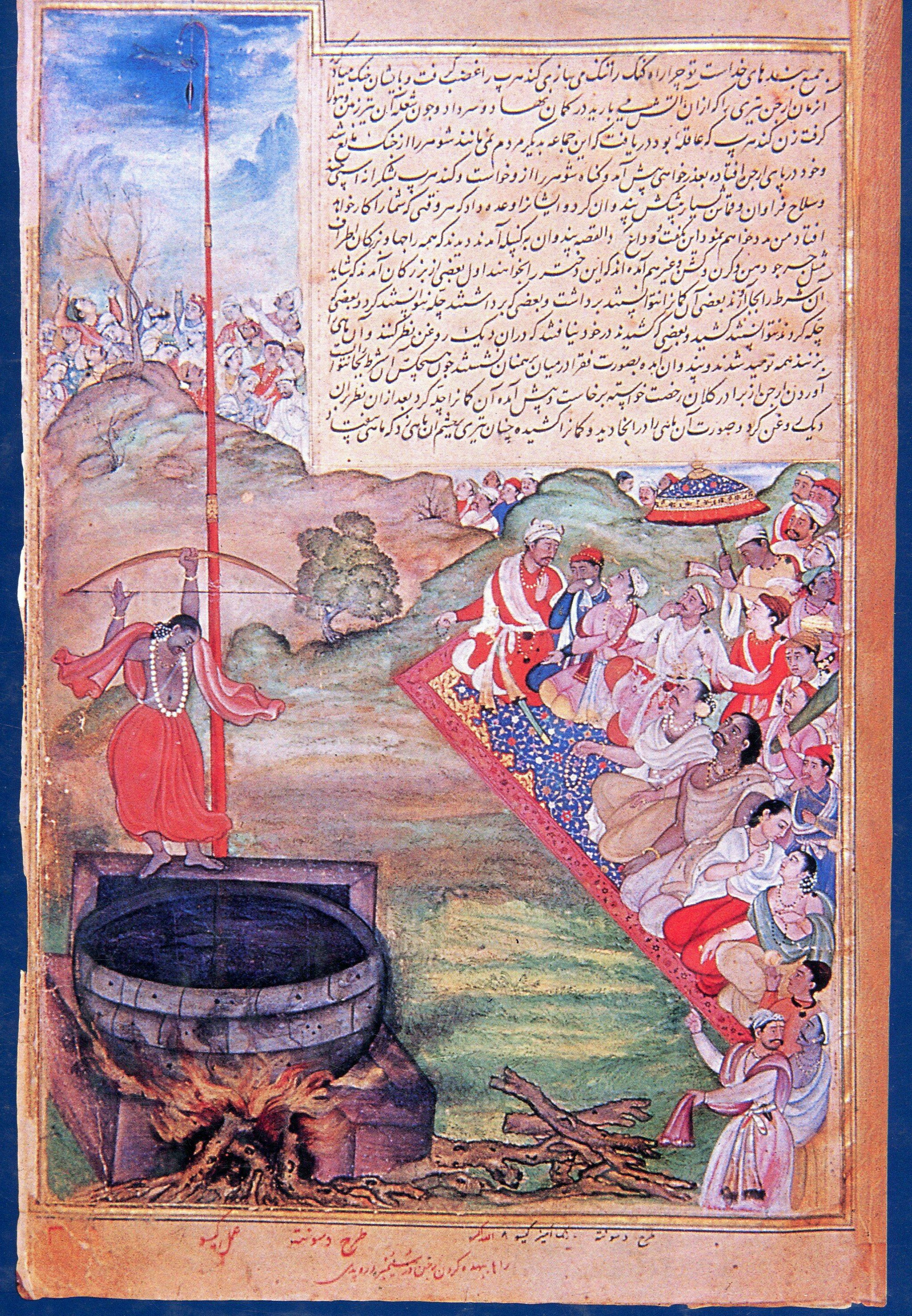
Arjun hits the target.

He drew and composed as many as 31 full-page miniatures in the Razmnama. Abul Fazl, the grand vizier of Akbar, mentions in his writings that Daswanth left many masterpieces, but some of the details of Akbar's workshops were not recorded. In the four-volume manuscript, Daswanth drew outlines for fifteen of seventy-four miniatures in the first volume, nine out of seventeen miniatures in the second volume, and six out of sixty miniatures in the third volume. At least thirteen of the paintings he contributed to were in a horizontal format, which is the most in a major Mughal manuscript. This is probably due to that the scenes are of battles.

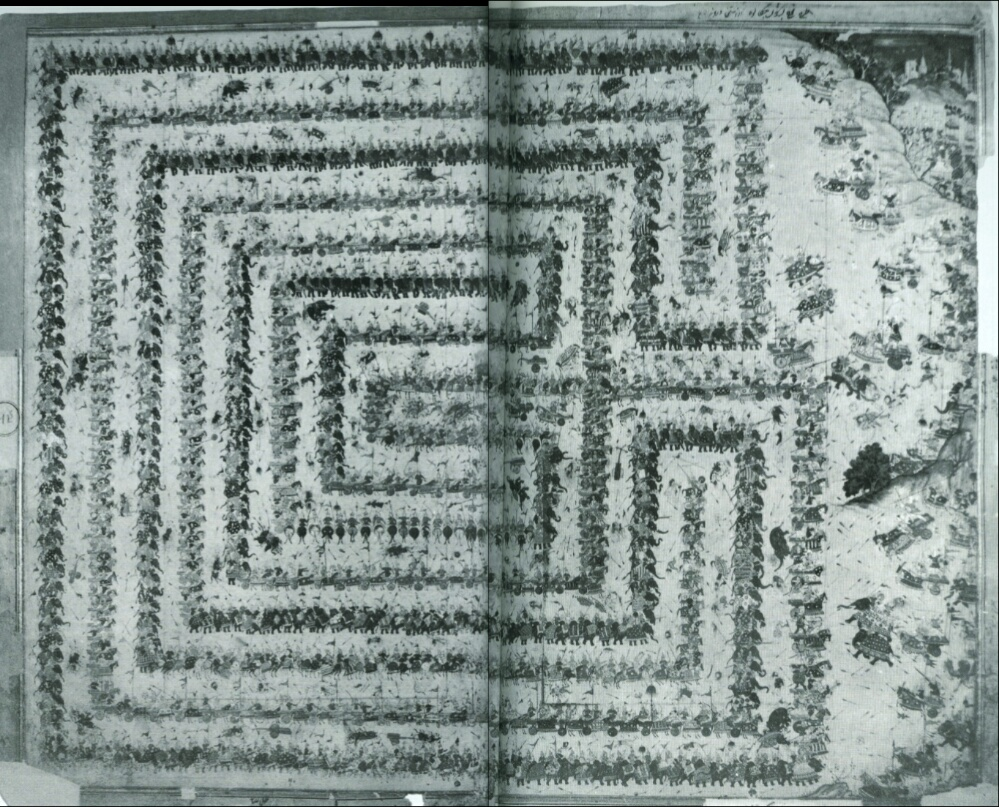
Chakravyuha: the tragic death of Abhimanyu

"Arjun hitting the target" (pictured right) is his first work in the Razmnana. It depicts a crowd of kings in King Drupada's capital for a ceremony called a svayamvara, where a woman, in this case, Draupadi, would pick a husband from a crowd of suitors. Arjuna, the protagonist of the epic, is pictured in red in the left of the scene near a caldron of hot oil over fire. The intricate facial expressions of the onlooking crowd and details of the fire and grass are indicative of Daswanth's unique style.

One impressive scene painted by Daswanth is Abhimanyu's Chakravyuha (pictured right). It is a double page composition with thousands of figures including soldiers, cavalry, and elephant and chariot riders. They are all arranged in a maze formation and cover the whole page. This was very unique and was not attempted in Mughal art. This is probably due to that the scenes are of battles.

== Artistic style ==
In Daswanth's illustrations, his chaotic, creative style distinguishes him from other artists of his time, like Basawan. Additionally, he is named as the designer for many paintings, which would then be completed by others, which is common for the time. His illustrations are often scary and otherworldly, proportionally inconsistent and weightless. Compared to Basawan, his art is full of energy and movement, while Basawan's art had more stabilizing elements.

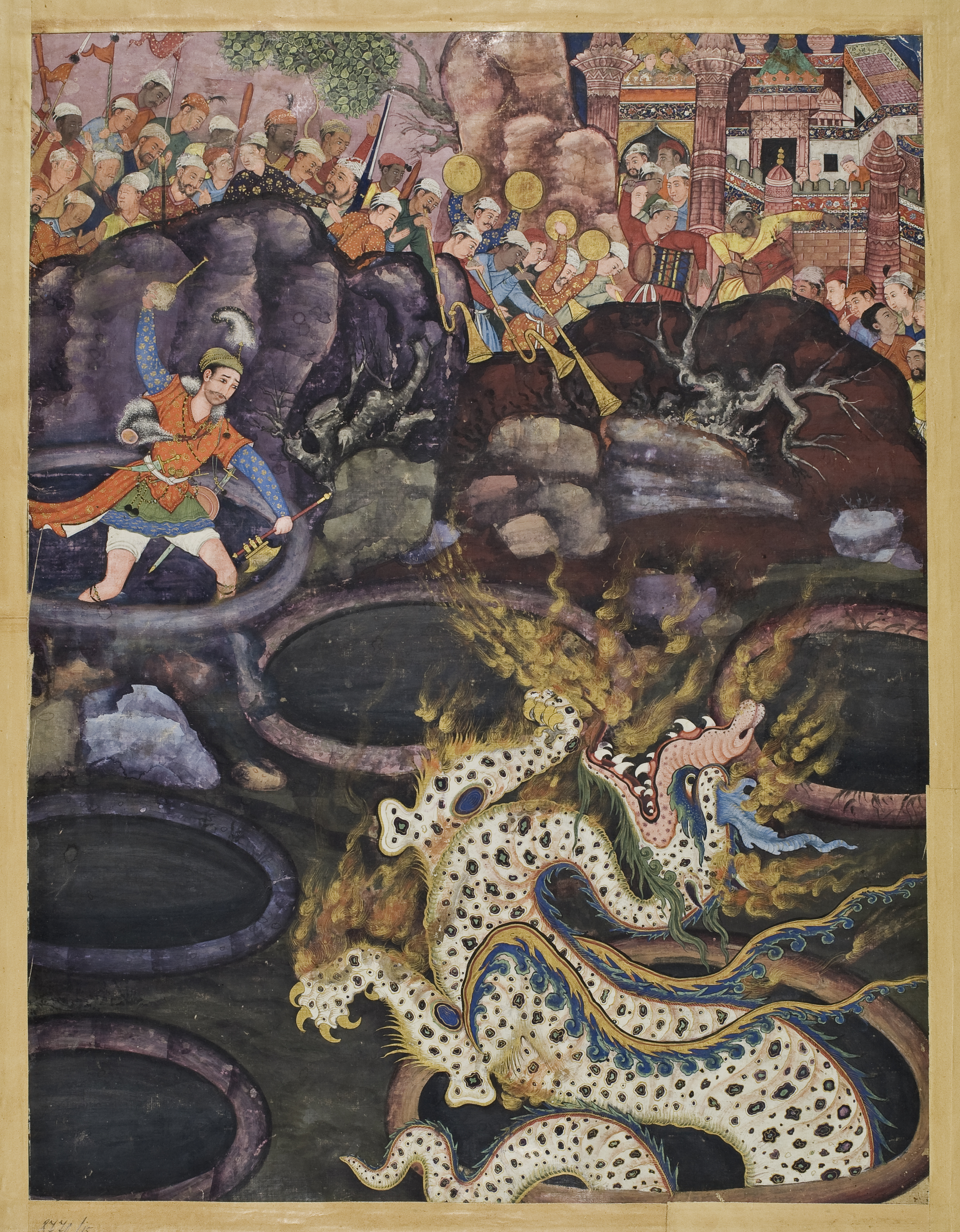
Umar Defeats a Dragon, from the Akbar Hamzanama manuscript

He tends to pay special detail to nature and the specific moods of figures. Similarly to other painters of his time, he tends to focus on the storytelling aspect of art. Many of his works depict gory violence and battles, but are still composed with attention paid to diagonals, circles, and other shapes, in balance with the natural surroundings. He often drew gods, demigods, important courtly figures, and warriors. There is also a beautiful understanding of perspective, based on the size of characters, architecture details, and background.

His art also shows a familiarity with some Chinese and western painting techniques. Works in the Razmnama called Arjuna shooting the arrow and the seventh adventure of the white horse show western technique and idiom, while "Arjuna fells Karna" has Chinese style clouds.
