= Bhootnath (TV series) =

Indian fantasy television series

Bhootnath is an Indian fantasy television series based on Devaki Nandan Khatri's novel of the same name. It was originally telecast on Doordarshan's DD National between 1996 and 1997.The show starred Benjamin Gilani in the title role, and was narrated by Indian actor Ashok Kumar. It was broadcast after the popularity of Chandrkanta series but only 13 episodes were broadcast.
