= List of Urdu novelists =

This is a list of notable Urdu language writers with their date of birth who wrote Novels in Urdu.

== 19th Century ==
Novelist	Date of birth-Death	Novels
Nazir Ahmad Dehlvi	(1830–1912)	Mirat-ul-Uroos, Bina-tul-Nash, Taubat-un-Nasuh, Fasaana-e-Mubtalaa, Ibn'ul Waqt
Muhammad Husain Azad	1830	Aab-e-Hayat
Ratan Nath Dhar Sarshar	1846	Fasana-e-Azad,
Premchand	(31 July 1880 – 8 October 1936)	Bazaar-e-Husn, Shatranj ke Khiladi
Mirza Hadi Ruswa	1857	Umrao Jaan Ada
Kishen Pershad	1864-1940	
Abdul Halim Sharar	1860	Firdos -e- Bareen
Rashid ul Khairi	1868	Sath Ruhoon K Aamalnamay, Nani Ashu
Abdul Haq	1872	

== 20th century ==
- Shaukat Thanvi 1904
- Mumtaz Mufti 1905
- Rashid Jahan 1905
- Sajjad Zaheer 1905
- Ahmed Ali 1910
- Saadat Hasan Manto 1912
- Krishan Chander 1914
- Mirza Adeeb 1914
- Khwaja Ahmad Abbas 1914
- Naseem Hijazi 1914
- Ismat Chughtai 1915
- Rajinder Singh Bedi 1915
- Ahmad Nadeem Qasmi 1916
- Jagan Nath Azad 1918
- Razia Butt 1924
- Shaukat Siddiqui 1923
- Intizar Hussain 1923
- Ashfaq Ahmed 1925
- Harcharan Chawla
- Ibn-e-Insha 1927
- Qurratulain Hyder 1927
- Altaf Fatima 1927
- Begum Akhtar Riazuddin 1928
- Ibn-e-Safi 1928
- Bano Qudsia 1928
- Shabnam Romani 1928
- Altaf Fatima 1929
- Fatima Surayya Bajia 1930
- Salma Siddiqui 1931
- Wajida Tabassum 1935
- Obaidullah Baig 1936
- Muhammad Mansha Yaad 1937
- Mustansar Hussain Tarar 1939
- Anis Nagi 1939
- Mazhar ul Islam 1949
- Mirza Athar Baig 1950
- Zulfiqar Gilani 1960
- Pervez Bilgrami 1962
- Muhammad Asim Butt 1966
- Azhar Abidi 1968
- Rahman Abbas 1972
- Akhtar Raza Saleemi 1974
- Ali Akbar Natiq 1974
- Idris Azad 1969

== 21st century ==
- Rahman Abbas
