= Major Chandrakanth =

Major Chandrakanth may refer to:

- Major Chandrakanth (play), in Tamil by Indian filmmaker and writer K. Balachander
  - Major Chandrakanth (1966 film), Tamil film adaptation by Balachander
- Major Chandrakanth (1993 film), Telugu film directed by K. Raghavendra Rao

== See also ==
- Chandrakanta (disambiguation)
