= Umar Defeats a Dragon =

Coordinates: 48.2075°N 16.3817°E

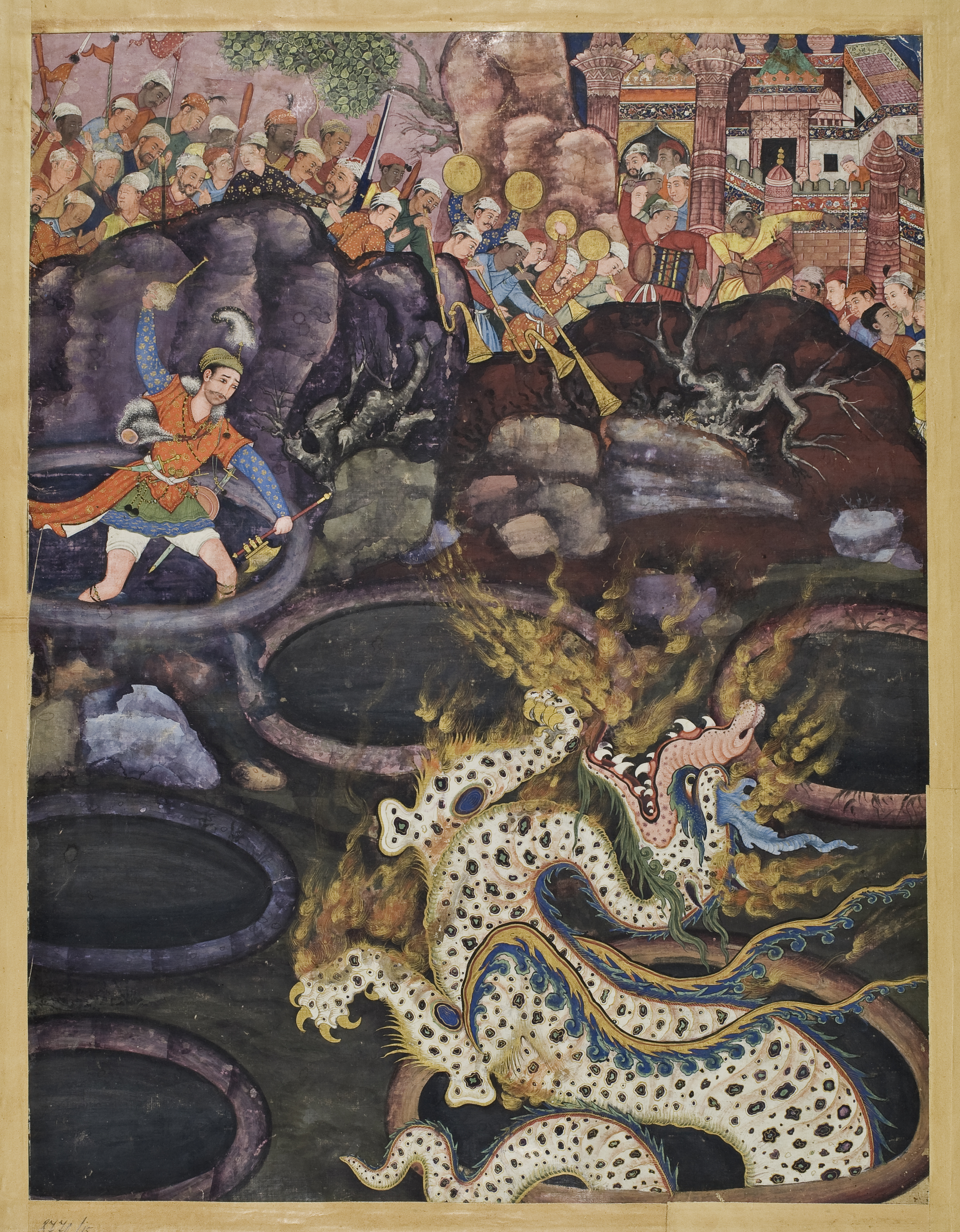
- Author: Daswanth
- Publication place: Mughal Empire

Umar Defeats a Dragon is a page from a Mughal Illuminated manuscript illustrating an episode from the Hamzanama. The page size is 55 x 70 cm. It is in the collection of the Museum of Applied Arts, Vienna, Vienna.

The manuscript is credited to Daswanth. The illuminated manuscript shows Umar fighting a dragon from the Hamzanama manuscript, from the Mughal dynasty.
