= Pervez Bilgrami =

Pakistani writer (born 1962)

- پرویز بلگرامی
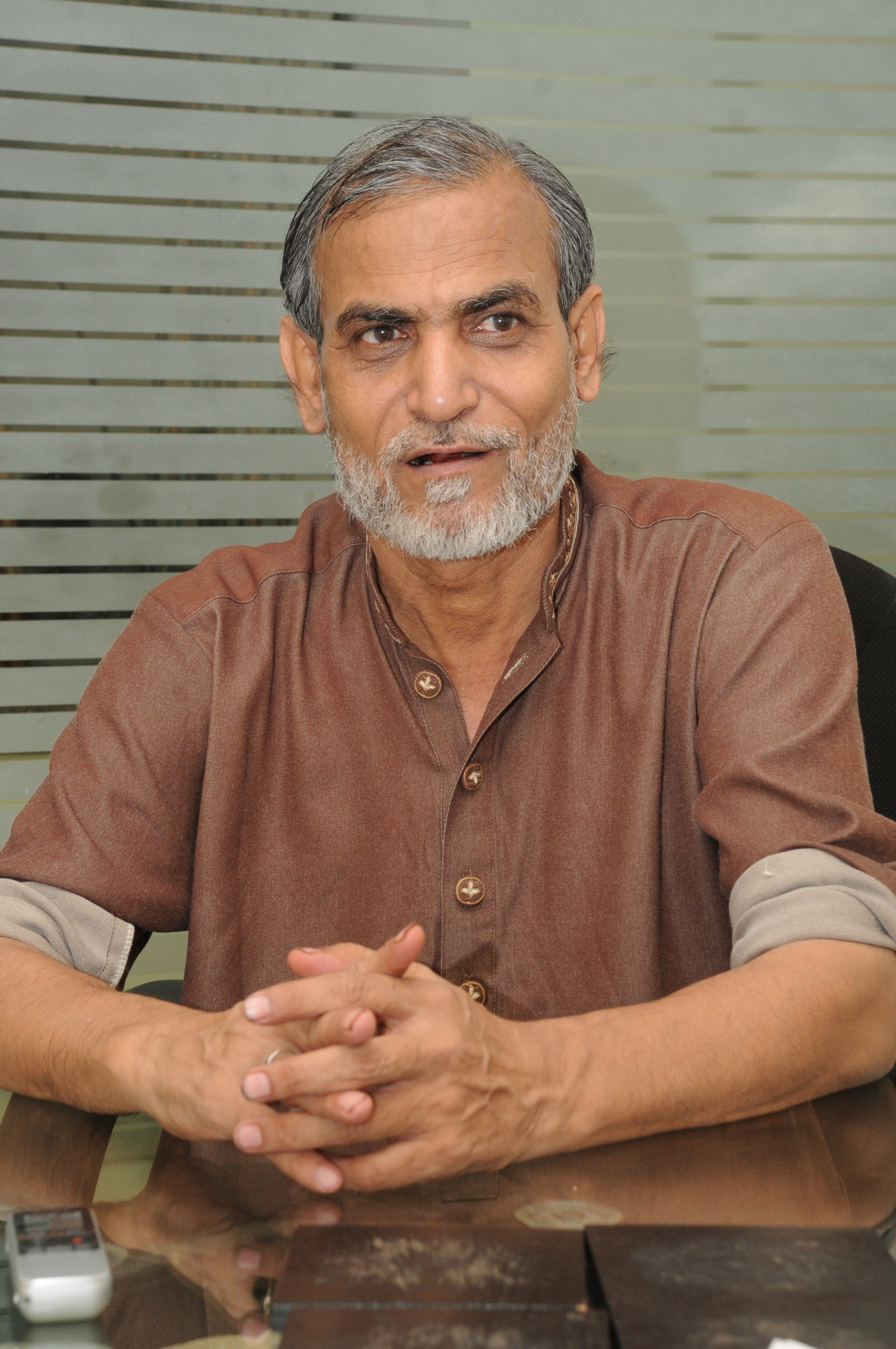
- Bilgrami in 2012
- Born: 1962 (age 63–64); Dhaka, East Pakistan
- Occupation: Writer
- Children: 3
- Writing career
- Language: Urdu
- Years active: 1969—present
- Notable works: Dosra Janam (دوسرا جنم); Tareekh-e-Khandhar (تاریک کھنڈر); Mataa-e-Dil-o-Jaan (متاع دل و جاں); Masiha (مسیحا); Shaheen Sifat (شاہین صفت)
- Notable awards: Dosheza Writer Award

Pervez Bilgrami (پرویز بلگرامی) (born 1962) is a Pakistani writer from Karachi. He has been an editor of Sachi Kahanian Digest (سچی کہانیاں) for the last 20 years. He currently works as an editor for Sargazusht (سرگزشت).

Throughout his career, Bilgrami has written over 6,000 stories under many pen names. He has 28 published novels, most of which have become bestsellers. Dosra Janam (دوسرا جنم), Tareekh-e-Khandhar (تاریک کھنڈر), Mataa-e-Dil-o-Jaan (متاع دل و جاں), Masiha (مسیحا), and Shaheen Sifat (شاہین صفت) are some of his best-known works. Bilgrami has been awarded the "Dosheza Writer Award" two times in last ten years. His latest interview was published in the Daily Express on 12 June 2012.

== Biography ==
=== Early life ===
Bilgrami was born in 1962 in Dhaka, East Pakistan. His father's name was Mazhar Ali Jauhar but was known as Johar Bilgrami. He was a poet, literary personality, and a well-known movie director. Bilgrami's grandfather, Allama Mehmood Hasan Mujtahid, was a religious scholar, and Johar Bilgrami was brought up in a strict religious atmosphere and joined the film industry later. Ali met Raja Mehdi Ali Khan at a party at the age of 18 and this meeting helped him enter the film industry. He went to Mumbai with Khan and later spent his life in Pakistan. Johar Bilgrami's films include Aadhi Raat, Gharoni Jhurr, and Drao.

Pervez was a footballer in his early years. He picked up the habit of reading novels from his father, who had a great collection of pulp fiction books. Bilgrami read اور تلوار ٹوٹ گئی - Aur Talwar Toot Gai (And the Sword Broke), the longest novel by Naseem Hijazi, when he was a student in 2nd grade.

=== First story ===
Bilgrami had his first short story published in a daily newspaper when he was only 7 years old. This achievement strengthened his writing skills and he received many accolades and much appreciation from his family and relatives. His father arranged a story-writing contest between him and his sister. Pervez wrote the story Ek Teer Do Shikar – Two Birds One Stone for the contest. At the age of 16, Bilgrami began writing short stories for the children's page of Daily Jang newspaper.

=== Father's death ===
In 1969, Bilgrami went to West Pakistan with his father, where the director was to present a new movie, Thandi Aag – Cold fire; however, Johar couldn't complete the film due to the country's situation at the time, and the family had to travel to Karachi. In 1972, Bilgrami's father died. He then started a small business and held a stall at Friday markets. At this time, he began writing stories again.

== Writing ==
Bilgrami's many stories were published in a well-known storybook called Sachi Kahanian – True Stories. In 1990, he joined Sachi Kahanian (Dosheeza Group of Publications) as a sub-editor and became the editor in 1994. Bilgrami worked at the firm for 18 years. He began writing his first novel, Ghazi, in serialized form in the early days of his job there. After captivating readers for many years, Ghazi was published as a book and became a bestselling novel. Ghazi tells the story of a man who witnesses the bloodshed during the partition of India in 1947. In July 2008, Bilgrami left the editorship of Sachi Kahanian and joined Sarguzasht (Jasoosi Group of Publications) as an editor.

Bilgrami has written many thrillers, mysteries, horrors, romantic, and historical novels. Many of these have become bestsellers, including Ghazi, Dosra Janam, Tareekh-e-Khandhar, Mataa-e-Dil-o-Jaan, Masiha, Shaheen Sifat, and Muqadas Taboot. He has also written horror re-enactment stories for the television channel Dawn News. 6 Episodes have been broadcast, and videos are available on YouTube. Horror re-enactment is accomplished through the use of scary supernatural elements and true stories. Bilgrami also writes what in Pakistan is known as "mini stories", or "Mini Kahani", which are stories consisting of one page only. He has written more than 150 of these, and they have been uploaded to many websites and Urdu forums.

Most of the literature, stories, and novels by Pervez Bilgrami are available online, on websites such as urdudost.com, urduyouthforum.org, novelpk.com, kitaabghar.net, kitaabghar.com, urdukorner.com, and friendskorner.com.

=== Awards ===
Bilgrami has won many awards and received praise for his writing. In 2003, he received a "Best Writer" award from the Interior Minister of Pakistan, General Moinuddin Haider. He has also won the "Dosheza Writer Award" twice.

== Personal life ==
Bilgrami married in 1993, at the age of 31. He has two sons and one daughter.

== Selected list of publications ==
- Ghazi
- Tareek Khandher
- Doosra Janam
- Farar
- Fakia
- Mata-e-Dil-o-Jaan
- Masiha
- Shanno
- Jurm e Musalmaan
- Shaheen Sift
- Muqadas Taboot
- Dast-e-Aalam Mei'n
- Aatish-e-Junoo
- Aami k
- Mi Aied
- Nadida Mahboob
- Manzile'n Gardish Mei'n
- Masiha
- Mashahir-e-Daura'n Part 1 (Biography of Urdu poets in narrative style)
- Mashahir-e-Daura'n Part 2
- Mashahir-e-Daura'n Part 3
- Dastaan-e-Aulia Part (Biography of Sufi Saint)
- Dastaan-e-Aulia Part 2
- Maujza kio'n kab kaise
