= Zulfiqar Gilani =

Zulfiqar Gilani (Zulfiqar Arshad Gilani) is a Pakistani media journalist, author, researcher and screenwriter.

He is the author of eight historical novels, seven history books and hundreds of long and short stories and research articles, and more than three dozen teleplays, documentaries and special transmissions. He compiled the first-ever Urdu timeline, from Creation to Christ. He produced the most significant work on Alexander the Great in Urdu with more than 1500 pages and 500 historical references.

== Career ==
=== Print journalism ===
Zulfiqar Gilani started his career as journalist from Daily Kaleem, Sukkur and then worked as Editor, Daily Hurriyat, Karachi, Editor, Daily Waqt, Karachi, Editor, Monthly Naya Rukh Digest, Karachi, Chief News Editor and Joint Editor, Daily Khabrai, Islamabad, Lahore, Karachi, Joint Editor, Daily Naya Akhbar, Peshawar, Islamabad, Manager Coordination, Daily Express, Islamabad and Managing Editor, Daily Hamdard, Islamabad, Lahore, Peshawar.

He worked as reporter, interviewing notable figures from different walks of life. He wrote a weekly political diary for Daily Nawa-e-Waqt in the 1980s, political columns for Daily Qoumi Akhbar & Daily Juraat, Karachi and essays for Daily Jang, Daily Express, Daily Khabrain & Daily Nawa-e-Waqt.

=== Fiction ===
Gilani wrote fiction stories, Serials & Essays for Akhbar-e-Jahan, Karachi. He contributed more than 500 long & short stories for Sarguzisht from 1999 to 2011 Naey Ufaq, Naya Rukh, Action, Aanchal, Ibn-e-Safi Magazine from 1984 to 1996 translated at least 150 English novels wrote seven fictional series from 1984 to 1996. His most famous fictional characters were:

- Captain Raheela Adnan—Field Agent and Group Leader of Islamic Secret Service who adopts the cover name of Desert Fox. More than 25 stories of her adventures published in Monthly Naya Rukh, Action and Naey Ufaq Digests.
- Babar—A Mafia hit man becomes a Pakistani Intelligence agent. He published more than 20 adventures of Babar.

=== Broadcasting ===
He worked as a news reader and anchor at Radio Pakistan, Khairpur and Karachi.

He then worked as script editor, producer and writer with ARY Digital Network, Karachi. He was news editor for the launch team of Waqt Television, Lahore. Gilani also worked as assignment editor and senior producer at City42, Lahore and as senior assignment editor and bureau chief, Karachi with SAMAA TV.

Zulfiqar Gilani was regular script writer for Radio Pakistan, Khairpur for one year. He scripted ARY Digital's Children's program Super Kids Funda from Jun 2006 to Feb 2007. He drafted promos, Ramadan broadcasts, concerts, magazine shows, and live transmissions such as 8 October (Earthquake day) and anniversary programs. He wrote documentaries such as River Indus, Aashura e Muharram, Sindh Assembly Building, Khaddi, Victoria, Rangsaaz, Bargad, Bahishti, Chilman and many others for SAMAA TV.

== Credits ==
=== Teleplays ===
He wrote more than three dozen teleplays, documentaries and other scripts. Partial list:

- Thar Express
- Dilkash
- Beyzuban
- Mashghalah
- Azaadi
- Aveza
- Gum
- Zakham
- Bhanwar
- Utran
- Jhooti
- Jaldbaz
- Saza

=== Novels ===
- Khuda Aur Mohabbat. Published by Ilm Dost Publications, Urdu Bazar, Lahore in 2011.
- Bey Zuban Khuda. Published by Ilm Dost Publications, Urdu Bazar, Lahore in 2011
- Naag Rani (Parts I & II). Published by Maktaba Al-Quraish, Urdu Bazar, Lahore in 1999
- Awaraa. Published by Ilm Dost Publications, Urdu Bazar, Lahore in 2007

==== Historical/semi-historical ====
- Babul Ka Musafir (Part I & II).... Biggest research on Alexander the Great in Urdu. More than 1500 pages with 500 detailed historical references. Published by Ilm Dost Publications, Urdu Bazar, Lahore in 2010.
- Taj Mahal .... Based on love legend of Mughal Emperor Shah Jahan and his beloved Queen Arjumand Bano (Mumtaz Mahal). Published by Ilm Dost Publications, Urdu Bazar, Lahore in 2008, 2009 & 2011.
- Rani Jhansi .... A complete portrait of Rani Lakshmibai of Jhansi, The Heroine of First Independence War of India. Published by Ilm Dost Publications, Urdu Bazar, Lahore in 2005.
- Raj .... Story of a princely state heiress who fell in love with a British Army Officer and her people were fighting against Britain. Published by Maktaba Al-Quraish, Urdu Bazar, Lahore in 2000.

=== History ===
- Tareekh-ul-Anbiya .... Some important events from the lives of the Islamic Prophets (Adam to Muhammad). Published by Ilm Dost Publications, Urdu Bazar, Lahore in 2005.
- Qasas-ul-Anbiya .... Brief but important happenings in the lives of Holy Prophets. Published by Ilm Dost Publications, Urdu Bazar, Lahore in 2005.
- Tareekhi Rooman (Part I & II) .... Research articles on romantic figures who dominated the history. Published by Ilm Dost Publications, Urdu Bazar, Lahore in 2002, 2005, 2007, 2009 & 2011.
- Tareekh ka Safar (Part I & II) .... Story of time .... A Mini Encyclopedia .... Detailed Articles .... Invaluable information. Published by Ilm Dost Publications, Urdu Bazar, Lahore in 2003, 2006, 2008 & 2011.
- Lazwaal Mohabbatain .... Research on sub continent's historical/ semi historical love tales. Published by Ilm Dost Publications, Urdu Bazar, Lahore in 2006.
- Karwan-e-Tehzeeb .... First ever Urdu timeline from the creation of Universe to the birth of Christ. Published by Ilm Dost Publications, Urdu Bazar, Lahore in 2005.

==== Research articles ====
Gilani is a contributor and writer for Sarguzisht, Karachi, including more than 100 Urdu articles about love legends and other topics.

He also publishes Urdu research articles on Pakistan heritage under the name of Zulfi Shah for Sarguzisht.

He produced the English website covering the history of Gilani Syeds.
