= Qubad Kamran =

Qubad Kamran, also known as Kavadh I, is a character in the Persian epic The Adventures of Amir Hamza (Hamzanama). He was a king of Persia and is the subject of the first several chapters of the epic. He is described as charitable and just, so that his realm was prosperous and affluent without any sort of inequality, and his court was "the epitome of learning, wisdom, and prudence".

Qubad Kamran was the king of Persia, present-day Iran. He was a brave and just ruler. He always tried to facilitate his citizens, and his subjects were pleased with him and praised him.

Qubad Kamran had 40 ministers in his court, and among them Alqash was his Grand Vizier. He also had 700 scholars and 700 astrologers in his court, who told him about wisdom and future circumstances.
