= Prem Ya Paheli – Chandrakanta =

Indian Hindi language fantasy television show

- Genre: Indian soap opera
- Created by: Triangle Film Company
- Based on: Chandrakanta by Devaki Nandan Khatri
- Directed by: Nikhil Sinha, Dharmesh Shah and Manish Singh
- Starring: (For cast see below)
- Country of origin: India
- Original language: Hindi
- No. of seasons: 1
- No. of episodes: 52

Production
- Producer: Nikhil Sinha
- Running time: 45 minutes

Original release
- Network: Life Ok
- Release: 4 March – 27 August 2017

Prem Ya Paheli – Chandrakanta is an Indian Hindi language fantasy television show, produced and directed by Nikhil Sinha. The show stars Kritika Kamra and Gaurav Khanna in lead roles. The show is produced by Triangle Film Company and is inspired by the popular 1888 Hindi novel Chandrakanta by Devaki Nandan Khatri. The dialogue writer for the show is Shailesh Pratap singh The show telecasted on Life OK from 4 March 2017 on Saturday-Sunday at 9 pm. First promo of the show was released on 8 February 2017. A special sequence of the show was also shot at the Golkonda Fort in Hyderabad. Show went off-air abruptly on 27 August 2017.

== Plot ==
The show is inspired by the novel Chandrakanta. The show starts when a king successfully possesses all the powers of the world and stores and locks those powers to keep anyone from trying to steal the powers. He and his wife die after another king attacks them. 100 years later, the king and his wife are reborn. The show then follows the story of the prince and princess falling in love and rediscovering the Tilism, in spite of facing a lot of trouble created by Prince Shivdutt who is considered as the rightful owner of the "Tilism".

== Cast ==
- Kritika Kamra as Princess Chandrakanta / Maharani Chandrika
- Gaurav Khanna as Prince Virendra Singh / Maharaj Harshvardhan
- Sudesh Berry as Marich
- Ankit Arora as Crown Prince Shivdutt
- Iris Maity as Bichhoo Kanya Shyamala / Rajkumari Taramati
- Chandan K Anand as Kroor Singh
- Harsh Vashisht as Maharaj Jai Singh
- Gungun Uprari as Maharani Ratnagarbha
- Sandeep Mohan as Maharaj Surendra Singh
- Jaswinder Gardner as Maharani Padvika
- Manasvi Vyas as Maharani Kamini
- Puneet Vashisht as Badrinath
- Jitendra Bohara as Aiyyar Nazim
- Abhishek Avasthi as Aiyyar Ahmed
- Sumit Arora as Aiyyar Zakir
- Bibriti Chatterjee as Aiyyara Chapla
- Sonal Shrotriya as Aiyyara Champa
- Shailesh Datar as Pandit Jagannath
- Rohit Choudhary as Prince Jai Aditya
- Sunny Sachdeva as Aiyyar Devgiri
- Nikunj Malik as Soundarya
- Patrali Chattopadhyay as Parijaat
- Rahul Trivedi as Jhumroo
- Abhilash Chaudhary as Yakshraj Param
- Michelle Shah as Yakshini Siyali / Mansi
- Zeeshan Ahmed Khan/Ankur Nayyar as Tej Singh
