= Chandrakanti =

Indian deep-fried dessert

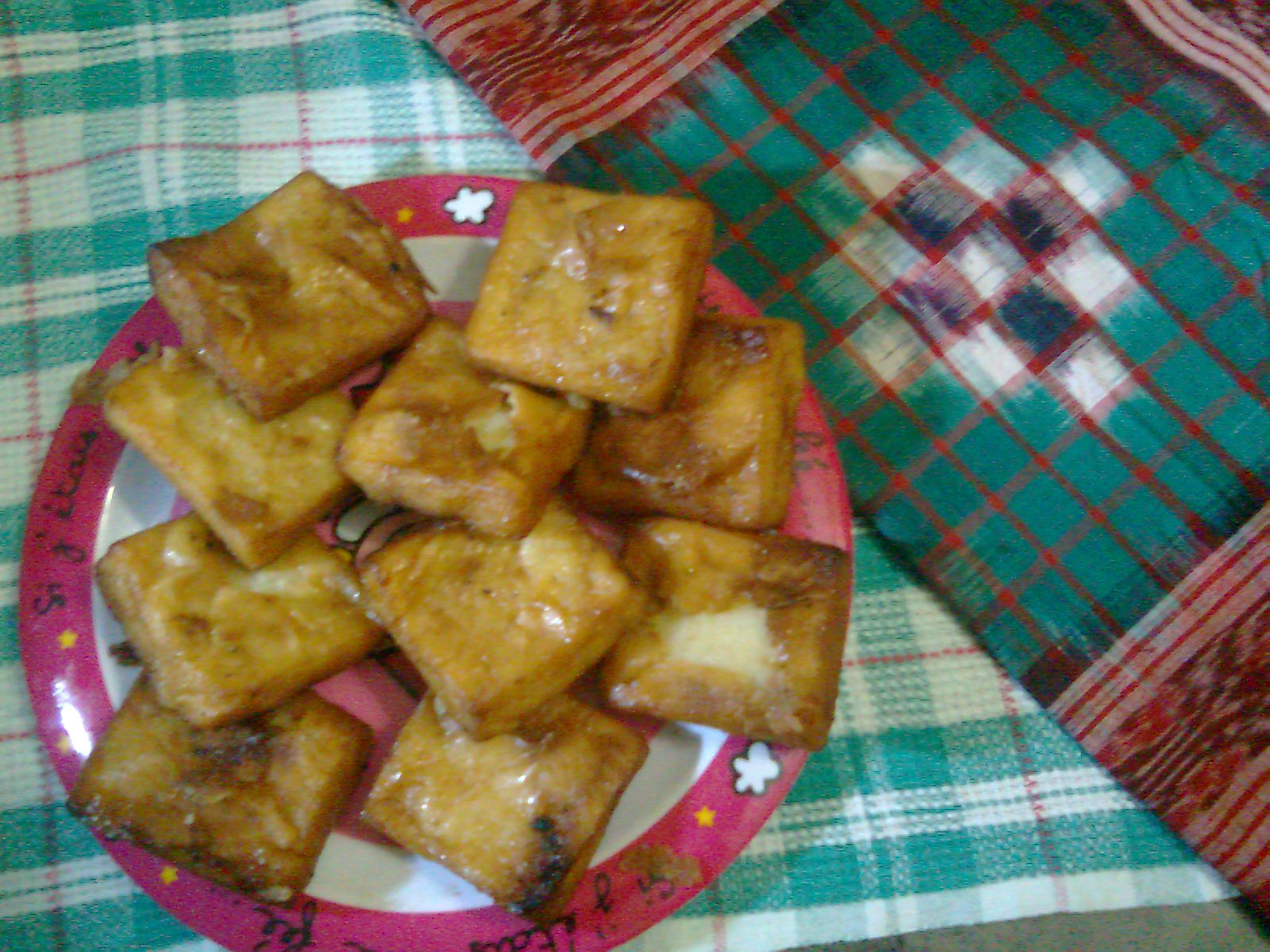
- Chandrakanti Pitha for Purnima vrat
- Course: Dessert
- Place of origin: India
- Region or state: Odisha
- Main ingredients: Green gram, rice flour, sugar, ghee

Chandrakanti is a deep-fried dessert originating from Odisha made from green gram,rice flour, sugar, and ghee.

== See also ==
- Oriya cuisine
