= Chandrakanta (novel) =

1888 epic fantasy book by Devaki Nandan Khatri

Sawita
- Author: Devaki Nandan Khatri
- Language: Hindi
- Genre: Fantasy novel
- Publisher: Lehri Book Depot, Varanasi, India
- Publication date: 1888
- Publication place: India
- Dewey Decimal: 891.433

Chandrakanta is an epic fantasy Hindi novel by Devaki Nandan Khatri. Published in 1888, it was the first modern Hindi novel. Often cited as first bestselling Hindi novel, it gained a cult following, and contributed to the popularity of the Hindi language. The copyright on the novel expired in 1964 and it is now in the public domain, along with other titles by the author.

It inspired Nirja Guleri's mega-budget TV serial of the same name (though the screenplay had many differences from the novel) which became one of the biggest-ever blockbusters in the history of Indian television.

== Story ==
The story is a romantic fantasy about two lovers who belong to rival kingdoms: the princess Chandrakanta of Vijaygarh, and the prince Virendra Singh of Naugarh. Krur Singh, a member of the Vijaygarh king's court dreams of marrying Chandrakanta and taking over the throne. When Krur Singh fails in his endeavor, he flees the kingdom and befriends Shivdutt, the powerful neighboring king of Chunargarh (referring to the fort in Chunar that inspired Khatri to write the novel). Krur Singh coaxes Shivdutt to ensnare Chandrakanta at any cost. Shivdutt captures Chandrakanta and while running away from Shivdutt, Chandrakanta finds herself a prisoner in a tilism. Eventually, Kunvar Virendra Singh breaks the tilism and fights with Shivdutt with the help of aiyyars.

The Story slowly unfolds into Chandrakanta being kidnapped and getting rescued by Chapla. However, they get trapped into a Tilism by a quirk of fate. Prince Virender Singh starts breaking the Tilism to free Chandrakanta. The Story unfolds around the efforts of Virender Singh for breaking Tilism and King Shivdutt trying to stop him to do the deed himself.

Chandrakanta, the novel, has many sequels, prominent being a 7-book series (Chandrakanta Santati) dealing with the adventures of Chandrakanta and Virendra Singh's children in another major tilism.

== Adaptations ==
Chandrakanta was made into a television serial in the mid-1990s by its creator, writer, producer and director Nirja Guleri and this mega-budget serial went on to become one of the blockbusters on Indian television. The serial also introduced many new characters.

A new serial named Kahani Chandrakanta Ki was started in 2011 on Sahara One TV Channel, based on Khatri's next novel in the Chandrakanta series named Chandrakanta Santati (story about Chandrakanta's sons) by the director Sunil Agnihotri, with same degree of deviations from the original Devki Nandan Khatri novel. The story of Chandrakanta Santati was much different from the story shown in that show.

Indian filmmaker Vidhu Vinod Chopra tried producing a film adaptation of the book, which was to be directed by Ram Madhvani. The film was to have been titled Taalismaan and included Amitabh Bachchan among the cast, playing an Aiyyar. Abhishek Bachchan was to be seen in this screen adaption of the tale of Chandrakanta. The film was never made.

In 2017, two more TV adaptations were planned. The one on the channel Life Ok and titled Prem Ya Paheli – Chandrakanta again tries to retell the story. Unfortunately, the ending was not shown because the channel changed from Life Ok to Star Bharat.

Colors TV also started a TV show with the name Chandrakanta. Its story is totally different from the original novel. It was produced by Ekta Kapoor.

== Sequel ==
Chandrakanta was followed by Chandrakanta Santati (in 6 Volumes). The sequel chronicles the adventures of sons of Chandrakanta.

== See also ==
- Chunar Fort
- Umro Ayyar, a famous fictional ayyar, the basis of the ayyars in the novel
- Vijaygarh Fort
