= Chandrakanta Santati =

Hindi novel by Devaki Nandan Khatri

Chandrakanta Santati is an epic fantasy adventure Hindi novel by Devaki Nandan Khatri. Published in 6 Volumes, 24-part sequel, it serves as the sequel to Chandrakanta, the first modern Hindi novel which was released in 1888.

The phenomenal success of Chandrakanta prompted Devaki Nandan Khatri to write a 24-part sequel (which was further divided into 295-chapters or bayaans) titled Chandrakanta Santati (Chandrakanta's Progeny).

The novel primarily revolves around a mechanized labyrinth called "Tilism Of Jamania" prophesied to be broken by Chandrakanta's son Indrajeet Singh & Anand Singh with the help of a book called Rakt-Granth. The novel has various characters from Chandrakanta along with introducing a plethora of new characters.

== Contents ==
Volume I

Part 1	15 Bayaans
Part 2	18 Bayaans
Part 3	14 Bayaans
Part 4	12 Bayaans

Volume II

Part 5	13 Bayaans
Part 6	7 Bayaans
Part 7	6 Bayaans
Part 8	12 Bayaans

Volume III

Part 9	13 Bayaans
Part 10	10 Bayaans
Part 11	10 Bayaans
Part 12	10 Bayaans

Volume IV

Part 13	13 Bayaans
Part 14	11 Bayaans
Part 15	12 Bayaans
Part 16	14 Bayaans

Volume V

Part 17	17 Bayaans
Part 18	12 Bayaans
Part 19	15 Bayaans
Part 20	15 Bayaans

Volume VI

Part 21	12 Bayaans
Part 22	14 Bayaans
Part 23	12 Bayaans
Part 24	8 Bayaans

== Adaptations ==
- Kahani Chandrakanta Ki is a TV adaptation of the novel which was broadcast in 2011 on Sahara One, by director Sunil Agnihotri. The story was very different from the novel. Many actors from the 1994 TV Series reprised their role in the sequel series.
- Pawan Comics published a 12-part comic-book series based on the novel back in the 1990s.
- The novel was adapted as audiobook by the Swedish book publishing company Storytel in 2017. It is voiced by Vijay Vikram Singh, the voice of Bigg Boss, the popular Indian reality TV show.
- The entire novel consisting of 294-bayaans are narrated by Sameer Goswami which is available on YouTube.

== Sequel ==
This was followed by Bhootnath, a novel that detailed the exploits of an aiyar of the same name who had figured prominently in his earlier novels. He had modelled it on Chandrakanta Santati but could finish only 6-parts before his untimely death on August 1, 1913. His son Durga Prasad Khatri, who himself earned fame as a writer on account of his novels Raktamandir and Mrityukiran, finished the novel and wrote the next 15-parts.
