= Devaki Nandan Khatri =

Indian writer and novelist (1861-1913)

Devakinandan Khatri
- देवकीनन्दन खत्री
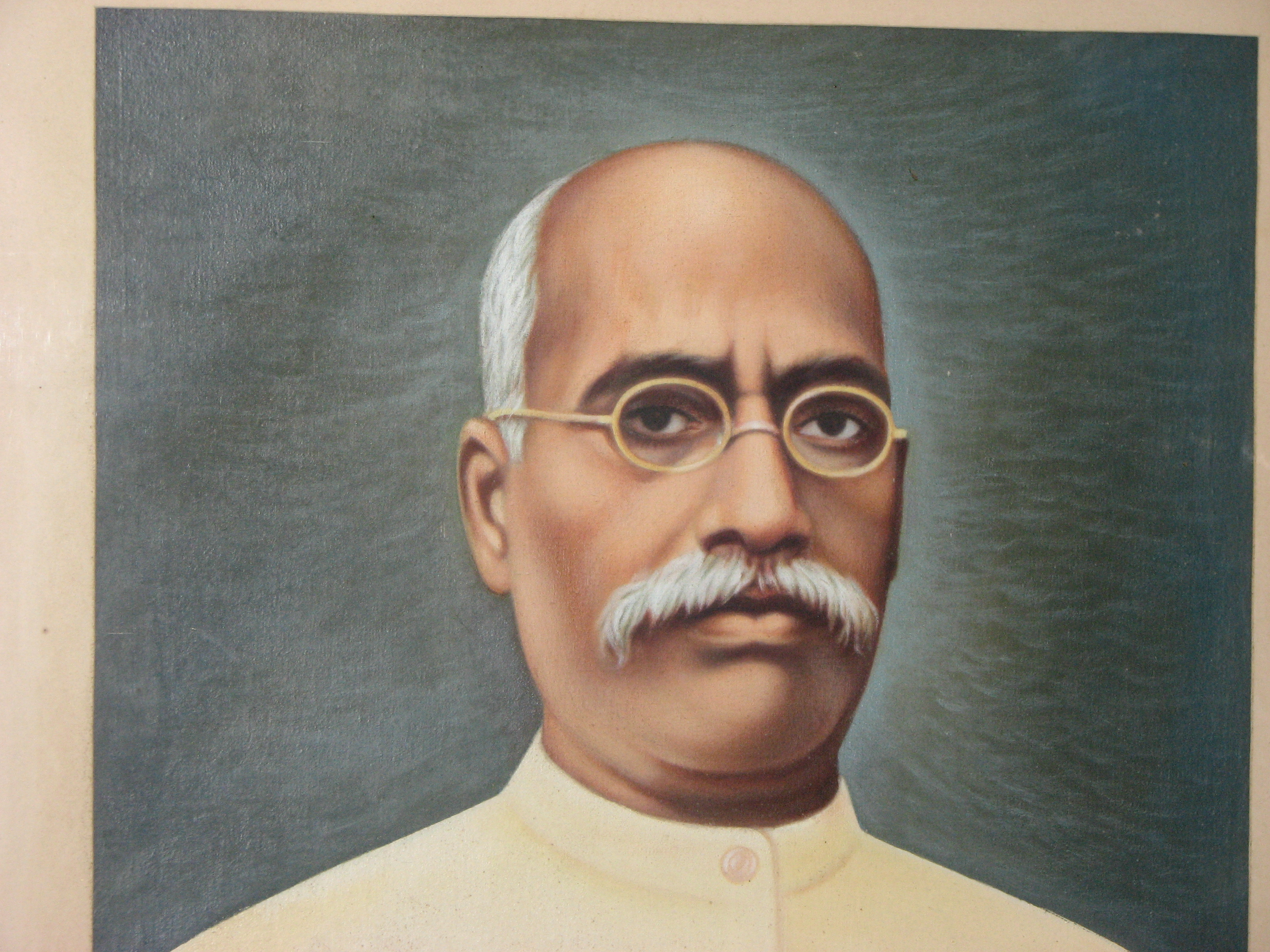
- Born: 18 June 1861; Tirhut district, Bengal Presidency, British India (present day Bihar, India)
- Died: 1 August 1913 (aged 52)
- Occupations: Writer, novelist, publisher
- Notable work: Chandrakanta

Devakinandan Khatri (18 June 1861– 1 August 1913) was an Indian writer who was born in Samastipur and wrote the historic fiction fantasy novel Chandrakanta.

== Biography ==
He was born on 18 June 1861 in a Punjabi family in Pusa village of Samastipur district of Bengal Presidency, British India (present day Bihar, India). His father's name was Lala Ishwardas. His forefathers were residents of Punjab (Lahore) and held high positions during the reign of the Mughals. Lala Ishwardas settled in Banaras during the reign of Sher Singh, son of Maharaj Ranjit Singh.

Khatri's early education was in Urdu-Persian. Later he also studied Hindi, Sanskrit and English. After finishing his early education, he reached Tekari Raj in Gaya and got a job with the king there. Later, he established a printing press called 'Lahari Press' in Varanasi and started the publication of Hindi monthly Sudarshan in 1900.

He died on 1 August 1913.

== Popular Works ==
Devakinandan Khatri contributed some of the most popular novels that not only helped to introduce a new genre in Hindi literature, but also led to the enrichment of the Hindi language as a whole. Some of the most important works of Devakinandan Khatri are:

- Chandrakanta
- Chandrakanta Santati
- Bhootnath
- Kajar Ki Kothari
- Narendra-Mohini
- Kusum Kumari
- Virendra Veer
- Katora Bhar Khoon
- Gupt Godna

== Death ==
Devakinandan Khatri died in 1913, leaving behind a collection of Hindi mystery novels that continue to captivate young readers. One of his notable works, 'Chandrakanta,' was transformed into a television series in the mid-90s, albeit with significant alterations to suit the television audience in terms of plot and characters. 'Chandrakanta' stands out as Khatri's most beloved novel, and there are rumors of its imminent adaptation into a Bollywood film. If all goes as planned, we may witness Amitabh Bachchan, Abhishek Bachchan, and Aishwarya Rai Bachchan taking on key roles in the cinematic rendition of Devakinandan Khatri's 'Chandrakanta,' helmed by filmmaker Vidhu Vinod Chopra.
