= Bakhtiyaar Irani =

Indian film and television actor

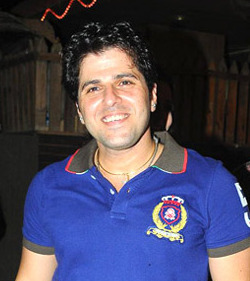
- Born: 19 November 1979 (age 46); Bombay, Maharashtra, India
- Education: Rutgers University,
- Occupations: Actor, dancer
- Years active: 2000–present
- Spouse: Tannaz Irani (m. 2007)
- Children: 2
- Relatives: Delnaaz Irani (sister)

Bakhtiyaar Irani (born 19 November 1979) is an Indian film and television actor who has participated in Indian television reality shows. He has appeared in the reality dance series Nach Baliye, paired with his wife Tannaz Irani. In 2009, the couple became participants in Bigg Boss.

== Early life ==
Bhakhtiyar Irani was born in Bombay (now Mumbai), Maharashtra. He was educated at Rutgers University.

His sister, Delnaaz Irani, is an Indian actress.

== Career ==
Bhakhtiyar Irani surprised everyone as he turned out to be the surprise package on the popular dance show Nach Baliye in which he participated with his wife Tannaz Irani. Subsequently, he participated in another reality dance series, Zara Nachke Dikha (2008). He was a contestant on the show Zor Ka Jhatka: Total Wipeout. In the same year, he appeared in the Himesh Reshammiya and Urmila Matondkar-starrer, Karzzzz (2008), playing Dr. Dayal, played by Jalal Agha in the original. He also appeared as an extra dancer in the song "Koi Mil Gaya" in Kuch Kuch Hota Hai (wearing a yellow shirt behind Shahrukh Khan). He, along with his wife Tanaaz Irani both have their Dance Academy TEE & BEE in Dubai. He also appeared in a number of reality dance shows broadcast on Doordarshan National Channel.

He has also been seen in Bigg Boss 6 in a short guest appearance.

He worked with his sister Delnaaz in Yes Boss, where he played on-screen brother to his off-screen sister. He was a student of St. Mary High School S.S.C, Mumbai.

== Television ==
- Batliwala House No. 43 as Shah Rukh Batliwala
- Lo Ho Gayi Pooja Iss Ghar Ki as Shiv Raj Khosla
- Yes Boss (TV series) as
- Badi Door Se Aaye Hain as Ronnie D'Souza
- Maa Exchange as himself
- Nach Baliye as Contestant (3rd position with wife Tanaaz Irani)
- Love Kaa Tadka as Vicky
- Welcome - Baazi Mehmaan-Nawaazi Ki as himself
- Miley Jab Hum Tum
- Bigg Boss 3 as Contestant (Evicted on Day 79)
- Nach Baliye - Shriman Vs Shrimati as Contestant
- Zaban Sambhal Ke as Parzim
- Krazzy Kia Re as Judge
- Wagle Ki Duniya – Nayi Peedhi Naye Kissey as Jamie Paul (2023)
- Tere Ishq Mein Ghayal as Vyom Sharma (2023)
- Zyada Mat Udd as Neenad Zhople (2025)

== Personal Life ==
In 2006, he met actor Tannaz Irani, on the set of Fame Gurukul. The duo fell in love and got married in 2007. On 20 March 2008, the couple's first child, a boy, was born. They named him Zeus after the Greek God. On 19 September 2011, Tannaz gave birth to a second girl, Zara Irani.

== See also ==
- List of Indian film actors
