= Bigg Boss (Hindi TV series) season 3 =

Bigg Boss
- Season 3
- Title card of season 3
- Presented by: Amitabh Bachchan
- No. of days: 83
- No. of housemates: 15
- Winner: Vindu Dara Singh
- Runner-up: Pravesh Rana
- No. of episodes: 84

Release
- Original network: Colors TV
- Original release: 4 October – 26 December 2009

Season chronology
- ← Previous; Season 2 Next → Season 4

Bigg Boss 3, also sometimes called Bigg Boss Tritiya!, is the third season of the Indian reality TV programme Bigg Boss. It began airing on 4 October 2009 on Colors TV with Amitabh Bachchan as the host. The 84-episode series ended on 26 December 2009 with actor Vindu Dara Singh emerging as the winner. Pravesh Rana was the first runner-up.

== Housemates status ==
Sr	Housemate	Day entered	Day exited	Status
1	Vindu	Day 1	Day 68	Evicted by Housemates
1	Vindu	Day 69	Day 83	Winner
2	Pravesh	Day 32	Day 83	1st runner-up
3	Poonam	Day 1	Day 83	2nd runner-up
4	Bakhtiyar	Day 1	Day 79	Walked
5	Aditi	Day 1	Day 75	Evicted
6	Claudia	Day 1	Day 68	Evicted
7	Raju	Day 1	Day 61	Evicted
8	Rohit	Day 1	Day 54	Evicted
9	Vinod	Day 33	Day 47	Evicted
10	Shamita	Day 1	Day 41	Walked
11	Tannaz	Day 1	Day 40	Evicted
12	Ismail	Day 1	Day 33	Evicted
13	Sherlyn	Day 1	Day 26	Evicted
14	Kamaal	Day 1	Day 18	Ejected
14	Kamaal	Day 46	Day 67	Guest
15	Jaya	Day 1	Day 5	Evicted

== Housemates ==
The participants in the order of appearance and entered in house are:

=== Original entrants ===
- Ismail Darbar – Singer and music composer. He is known for directing the songs of the hit film Hum Dil De Chuke Sanam starring Aishwarya Rai, Salman Khan and Ajay Devgan. He also produced the music of films like Devdas and Shakti: The Power.
- Sherlyn Chopra – Model and actress. She has appeared in Bollywood films like Dosti: Friends Forever and Raqeeb. She was crowned as Miss Andhra in 1999.
- Kamaal Rashid Khan – Director and Bhojpuri film actor. He is known for appearing in films like Sitam, Munna Pandey Berozgaar and Desh Drohi. He has been a part of many controversies regarding his films and his outspoken personality.
- Poonam Dhillon – Film actress. She is a veteran Bollywood actress who appeared in many yesteryear films like Kabhi Ajnabi The, Qayamat and Main Aur Mera Haathi. She appeared in the hit Zee TV show Kittie Party.
- Bhakhtyar Irani – Television actor. He is known for his role of Shiv in Lo Ho Gayi Pooja Iss Ghar Ki along with Sana Saeed. In 2006, he participated in the reality show Nach Baliye 2.
- Tannaz Irani – Actress and model. She has appeared in many shows like Baa Bahoo Aur Baby and Nach Baliye. She was also seen in films like Mere Yaar Ki Shaadi Hai and Main Prem Ki Diwani Hoon and 36 China Town.
- Vindu Dara Singh – Actor. He is the son of wrestler and actor Dara Singh. He starred in films like Partner and Kambakkht Ishq.
- Aditi Govitrikar – Actress, model and doctor. She earned the title of Miss World in 2001 and is also a former Gladrag Champion who completed her MBBS by education. She has appeared in films like Paheli and participated in Fear Factor: Khatron Ke Khiladi.
- Jaya Sawant – Housewife. She was the mother of actress, dancer and Bigg Boss 1 contestant Rakhi Sawant.
- Shamita Shetty – Film actress and model. She is the sister of Bollywood actress Shilpa Shetty. She is known for her role in Mohabbatein as Ishika. She later appeared in films like Saathiya, Mere Yaar Ki Shaadi Hai and Cash.
- Claudia Ciesla – Model and actress. She is from Germany and has appeared in films like Karma.
- Rohit Verma – Fashion designer. He was seen in the film Fashion.
- Raju Srivastav – Comedian. He was a popular comedian who had appeared in shows like The Great Indian Laughter Challenge and Comedy Circus. He also appeared in films like Baazigar, Tezaab and Maine Pyaar Kiya.

=== Wild card entrants ===
- Pravesh Rana – Model, presenter and actor. He won the title of Mr. India in 2008. He also has walked the ramp for various top designers.
- Vinod Kambli – Cricketer. He played for India as a left-handed middle order batsman, as well as for Mumbai and Boland, South Africa.

=== Guest entrants ===
- Panchi Bora – Actress. She is known for playing Prachi in Kayamath.

== Guest appearances ==
Week	Day	Guest(s)	Purpose of Visit	Ref(s)
Premiere	Day 1	Rakhi Sawant	To support her mother Jaya
1	Day 6	Salman Khan & Kareena Kapoor	To promote their film Main Aurr Mrs Khanna
2	Day 13	Akshay Kumar	To promote his film Blue
2	Day 14	Sharad Kelkar & Supriya Kumari	Special appearances from Colors shows for Diwali special
2	Day 14	Rashami Desai & Tina Datta	Special appearances from Colors shows for Diwali special
2	Day 14	Pracheen Chauhan & Archana Taide	Special appearances from Colors shows for Diwali special
3	Day 20	Riteish Deshmukh & Jacqueline Fernandez	To promote their film Aladin
4	Day 27	Ajay Devgn & Asin	To promote their film London Dreams
5	Day 34	Ranbir Kapoor & Katrina Kaif	To promote their film Ajab Prem Ki Ghazab Kahani
6	Day 39	Shilpa Shetty	To announced news of her wedding to Shamita Shetty
6	Day 41	Saif Ali Khan & Kareena Kapoor	To promote their film Kurbaan
7	Day 43	Zeus Irani	To meet his father Bhakhtyar Irani
8	Day 53	Akshay Kumar, Suniel Shetty, Chunky Panday. Sameera Reddy & Neha Dhupia	To promote their film De Dana Dan
9	Day 62	Ranbir Kapoor	To promote his film Rocket Singh: Salesman of the Year
10	Day 69	Hema Malini	To promote new dance series Dancing Queen
11	Day 74	Delnaaz Irani	To support brother Bhakhtyar Irani
11	Day 74	Dina Umarova	To support husband Vindu Dara Singh
11	Day 75	Arzoo Govitrikar	To support sister Aditi Govitrikar
11	Day 75	Anmol Thakeria & Paloma Thakeria	To support their mother Poonam Dhillon
11	Day 75	Priya Rana	To support her brother Pravesh Rana
11	Day 76	Kareena Kapoor	To promote her film 3 Idiots
12	Day 83	Priyanka Chopra	To promote her film Pyaar Impossible!

== Weekly summary ==
Week 1	Tasks	"Ghar Ek Mandir" where every member have to play different roles like mother, sister, son, daughter, son-in-law etc.: Guarding a gold coin in a locker from a secret agent. If the agent wins he gets immunity from nominations next week. Vindu won the task and won the immunity from week 2 nominations.
Week 1	Nominations	Jaya Sawant, Kamal Khan, Sherlyn Chopra
Week 1	Exits	Jaya Sawant was evicted after facing public vote.
Week 1	Hand Grenade	Option 1: Pick one house member who pays too much time and attention to his/her clothes, makeup, looks etc. This person will have to spend one week with simplicity i.e. simple clothes, no make-up etc.; Option 2: Pick one house member who according to you is very lazy. This person will have to wash clothes of all the housemates for one week.; Jaya Sawant chose Option 1 for Rohit.
Week 2	Tasks	The male housemates were asked to do all the chores (cooking, cleaning etc.). Housemates would fail the task if BiggBoss finds any female housemate doing the chores.; "Dil Aanek Dhadkan Ek". The housemates should sing a unity anthem(Ek Dusre Se from Hum) together when an alarm is set off by Bigg Boss.; The male house mates were asked to choreograph and rehearse dancing for the song "Chiggy Wiggy" from Blue, the female house mates would watch and learn the steps to perform the song in the activity area without practicing themselves. Akshay Kumar chose Poonam as the best dancer in the group.; Day 14:The female house mates were asked to choose 'Man of the week'. It was a tie between Rohit and Bhakhtyar. Female housemates were then asked to treat them as kings for the rest of the day.
Week 2	Nominations	Kamal Khan, Sherlyn Chopra
Week 2	Exits	Nobody was evicted as a 'gift' by Bigg Boss as it was the Diwali weekend.
Week 3	Tasks	Day 16: "Talent Bonanza - Kala Ka Pradarshan". Each house mate should perform an act(singing, dancing etc.) during the week. The other house mates got 200 points each, and they had to use those points to award points for the other inmates' performance.
Week 3	Nominations	Kamal Khan, Sherlyn Chopra
Week 3	Exits	Day 18: Kamal Khan has been ejected from the Bigg Boss house because of his rude and violent behaviour.
Week 4	Tasks	"Happy to Help" - House mates to make gift hampers for children. Items for the gift hampers would be fed through a conveyor belt after an alarm is set off by Big Boss. No more than five people can work at a time and all the hampers should contain the same list of items.
Week 4	Nominations	Sherlyn Chopra, Vindu Dara Singh
Week 4	Exits	Sherlyn Chopra was evicted after facing public vote.
Week 4	Hand Grenade	Option 1: Pick one house member who will be responsible for cleaning the entire house for one week.; Option 2: Pick one house member who will not step on the ground for one week. Other housemates will have to carry that person from one place to another if need be, except for toilet and bathroom.; Sherlyn Chopra chose Option 1 for Vindu.
Week 5	Tasks	House mates to prepare a short film. Shamita has been given an individual task wherein as a 'Mahanideshak' she has to keep a check whether the housemates are following the rule of speaking in Hindi or not. Failing which Shamita has the power to send the defaulter to jail.
Week 5	Twists	Big Boss declared Open Nominations: Since few housemates broke the rule of discussing about nominations, Big Boss declared open nominations, wherein each house member has to declare his vote in front of other housemates.
Week 5	Nominations	Tanaaz B Irani, Bhakhtiyaar M Irani, Vindu Dara Singh and Ismail Darbar
Week 5	Exits	Ismail Darbar was evicted after facing public vote.
Week 5	Hand Grenade	Option 1: Pick one male and one female who will have to talk to one another in sign language only. They can talk to rest of the housemates normally.; Option 2: Pick one male and one female who will have to stay together for one week, as if they are each other's shadow.; Ismail Drabar chose Option 2 for Tanaaz & Bhakhtiyaar.
Week 6	Tasks	Aditi has been honored with a title of 'Malika-e-Big Boss 3' for this weekly task. Everybody should be doing the things with Aditi's consent. She should be given a royal treatment and she will be the only one sleeping in Girls' room. The duties among other housemates have been divided as follows: Cleaning jobs – 2 people (Poonam & Rohit), Kitchen – 2 people (Bhakhtiyaar & Pravesh), Serving – 2 people (Vindu & Tanaaz), Entertainment – 2 people (Claudia & Vinod), Security – 1 person (Shamita). Raju will only be responsible for the job of 'Mahanideshak'.
Week 6	Nominations	Tanaaz B Irani, Bhakhtiyaar M Irani
Week 6	Exits	Tanaaz Irani was evicted after facing public vote. Shamita Shetty walked out of the show for her sister Shilpa's wedding.
Week 6	Hand Grenade	Option: Pick one house member who will be given the chance to talk to his/her loved one using the phone from Vodafone stand.; Tanaaz Irani chose Poonam, so that Poonam could talk to her daughter.
Week 7	Tasks	On the occasion of Children's Day, housemates were told to dress up like kids and had to enact a school day.; " Jal Hi Jiwan Hai" - Housemates have been provided with a 1000 Litre capacity water tank. Housemates have to use this water for all daily chores (except for cooking and drinking purposes) till the end of this weekly task. Except for this tank water all the sources for water in the house have been shut down. Amount of water left in the tank at the end of task will be a deciding factor for weekly budget.
Week 7	Nominations	Bhakhtiyaar, Aditi, Pravesh, Claudia, Vinod & Rohit
Week 7	Exits	Vinod was evicted after facing public vote
Week 7	Hand Grenade	Option 1: Pick one house member who will spend most of his/her time with Kamal Khan as his buddy.; Option 2: Pick one house member who will tell bed time story to Kamal Khan every night.; Vinod Kambli chose Option 2 for Vindu.
Week 8	Tasks	" Mansik Arogya Kendra" - Big Boss's house has been turned into a mental asylum wherein, Poonam is the doctor, Kamal the warden, Claudia the nurse and rest of the housemates are patients. Weekly budget will depend on the fact that how well does the warden performs his role and duties.
Week 8	Twists	This time a change in nomination procedure, Big Boss asked each house member to name one person whom they want to nominate and one person whom they want to be safe from next week's eviction.
Week 8	Nominations	Rohit and Vindu
Week 8	Exits	Rohit Verma was evicted after facing public vote.
Week 8	Hand Grenade	Option: Pick one male house member who will wear female clothes for the entire week..; Rohit Verma chose Raju for this task.
Week 9	Tasks	Housemates have to nominate one person as a leader who shall make sure Rules are followed by housemates as per the rule book. If any one breaks the rule, leader should immediately report to Bigg Boss. Failure in doing so, leader shall go to jail and budget would be reduced to half. If leader continues for 2 full successive day, then he/she shall be exempted from nomination for the next week. If leader continues for 4 full days then he/she shall go straight to final week.
Week 9	Nominations	Vindu, Raju and Pravesh
Week 9	Exits	Raju Srivastav was evicted after facing public vote.
Week 9	Hand Grenade	Option 1: Pick one housemember who will be staying in the garden for one week.; Option 2: Pick one housemember who will have to wash clothes for all the contestants for one week.; Raju Srivastav chose Option 1 for Pravesh.
Week 10	Tasks	Kamal Khan was appointed as the Big Boss of the house for this week and it will be up to him to run the house as per his wish including rules, tasks, punishments.
Week 10	Twists	This time a change in nomination procedure, Big Boss himself nominated all the housemembers. During the week 9 task, all of the contestants, violated the rules of Big Boss house. As a punishment to this violation, all the members were nominated for eviction.; Bigg Boss does a mock drill of Bhaktiyaar winning the Bigg Boss Season 3, which makes all the housemates initiate discussions against him.; Bigg Boss calls everyone for the results of the nominations and Kamal Khan leaves the Bigg Boss house
Week 10	Nominations	Aditi, Bhaktiyaar, Claudia, Poonam, Pravesh and Vindu
Week 10	Exits	Claudia was evicted after facing public vote.; Vindu was evicted by the votes from the housemates in the eyes of the housemates, but has been put in a secret room
Week 10	Hand Grenade	Option to Claudia: Immunity to be given to a housemate; Pravesh gets the immunity from any nomination; Option to Vindu: One housemate to be nominated for next week; Bhaktiyaar is given the nomination for the next week
Week 11	Tasks	the weekly task titled – song and dance. For this task, they have been provided with props and a red round carpet which is placed in the garden area. As part of the task, each one needs to dance to their allotted song on the red carpet along with the props as well as perform when the group song is being played by wearing masks.
Week 11	Twists	With respect to Hand Grenade given by Vindu, Bhaktiyaar is already nominated for this week. Pravesh is safe and reaches finals thanks to hand-grenade from Claudia
Week 11	Nominations	Bhaktiyaar, Vindu, Poonam, and Aditi
Week 11	Exits	Aditi Gowitrikar was evicted after facing public vote.
Week 11	Hand Grenade	One housemate has to do the serving of food and washing clothes for the next whole week; Bhaktiyaar was given the hand grenade
Week 12 (Finale Week)	Tasks	N/A
Week 12 (Finale Week)	Twists	Bakhtiyar has opted out of the game on Day 79, accepting the offer given by Bigg Boss. The hand grenade given by Aditi to Bakhtiyar is transferred to Pravesh, to serve the food to the remaining members.
Week 12 (Finale Week)	Finalists	Vindu, Poonam and Pravesh
Week 12 (Finale Week)	Exits	Bhakhtiyar had accepted the offer given by Bigg Boss of taking Rs. 1 million and opted out of the show on Day 79.; Poonam was evicted on the final day after facing public vote (Day 84).
Week 12 (Finale Week)	Hand Grenade	The hand grenade is transferred to Pravesh after Bakhtiyar's untimely exit.
Week 12 (Finale Week)	2nd Runner up (Day 84)	Poonam Dhillon
Week 12 (Finale Week)	Runner up (Day 84)	Pravesh Rana
Week 12 (Finale Week)	Winner (Day 84)	Vindu Dara Singh

Highlights

Week 1

- Day 5: Vindu and Bhakhtyar's fight almost came to blows over spilled milk in the Gym area. Vindu took offense when Bhakhtyar asked him to clean the spillage, assuming that Vindu created the mess.
- Kamal shouted at Poonam, Kamal felt she was referring to him when she said 'some' people are shameless and turn up at the table to eat without helping in the kitchen.

Week 2

- Kamal went on a hunger strike claiming that he would not eat or drink until Claudia says "I Love You" to him. After a day Big Boss set off the alarm in the middle of night when Kamal was trying to have food secretly.
- Kamal and Bhakhtyar were sent to jail, as they were found without their mikes for several hours.

Week 3

- Day 18: Kamal hit Rohit Verma with a bottle which hits Shamita instead and went on to fight with Raju Srivastav for supporting Rohit. Kamal used highly offensive language, swearing at Raju and Rohit. Kamal was ejected from the house after all the fellow contestants started revolting against him for physical fights.

Rohit was chatting with Shamita when he said he wasted some points last day for some unworthy performances (ref - Day 16:Tasks), and that he assumed he donated those points for charity and will get over it. Kamal took offense and threw a bottle at Rohit. Raju opined that Kamal should have talked to him if felt bad about the remark, hitting Rohit was not called for. Big boss called Kamal to the confession room and advised him to calm down. The housemates were not happy about no action being taken on Kamal. They planned to leave the house if no action was taken against him. Kamal was subsequently thrown out of the house for such violent behaviour.

Week 4

- Day 22: Rohit was not allowed to speak. Shamita was asked to interpret Rohit's actions and convey the message in Hindi language only, failing which both would be jailed. They will have to continue until Big boss orders them to stop.

Week 5

- Day 31: After watching the first part of the short film 'Agar, Magar, Lekin', Big Boss declared it to be a flop. Housemates were given a second chance to prepare a better film with good story, music and typical Hindi film masala.
- Day 32: Aditi was sent to jail by Shamita on account of speaking in English. Second short film 'Milke Judaa Na Hon' prepared by the housemates was appreciated by Big Boss and was thus declared a Superhit.

Week 6

- Day 35: Pravesh and Claudia were sent to jail (for one day) by Bigg Boss as they were found talking in English for a long time.
- Day 36: Bigg Boss declared that Shamita did not justify the role of 'Mahanideshak' and with the consent of housemates Raju was chosen as the new 'Mahanideshak'.

Week 7

- Day 43: Bigg Boss banned Vindu, Rohit and Raju from nomination on basis of planning and plotting. For the first time Six housemates are nominated for eviction.
- Day 44: Vindu, Raju and Rohit were punished for discussing nominations and plotting against other housemates.

Vindu Dara Singh was sent to the jail. Raju Srivastav was asked to spend his day on a floating bed in the Swimming Pool. Rohit suffered the most, as he was put inside a cage like a bird. The cage was lifted in the air by a crane. They were prohibited from talking to each other.

- Day 46: Claudia and Pravesh were ordered by Bigg Boss not to speak each other as they were caught talking in English multiple times. Kamal re-enters the Bigg Boss house on wild card entry this week. Bakhtiyar is badmouthing Claudia. Bakhtiyar cries.

Week 8

- Day 52: On the basis of Dr. Poonam's analysis (in the weekly task of mental asylum), Aditi's and Claudia's roles of patient and nurse respectively, were interchanged. Big Boss showed Rohit's video this time capturing his nicer side. Bakhtiyar keeps repeating that he is wanting Vindu and Raju out of the show.

Week 9

- Day 57 Bhaktiyaar is safe from being nominated. Raju nominated Bhaktiyar to be safe but Bhaktiyar nominated against Raju. Kamal being a guest does not have the right to nominate or get nominated.
- Poonam, Raju, Aditi, Bakhtiyaar and Pravesh are sent to jail for rules that were broken by housemates while they were the prime ministers of the house. Housemates break rules to ensure that all go to jail one by one and so that its fair to everyone.

Week 10

- Day 62: Kamal has a sudden bout of depression and suffers high blood pressure
- Day 67: Kamal Khan left the house.
- Day 68: Claudia is evicted from the house and Vindu Dara Singh has been sent to a secret room in the house where he can watch the other contestants.

Week 11

- Day 71: Bakhtyaar is already nominated as he got a hand-grenade from Vindu; Vindu, Aditi, and Poonam are also nominated for this week
- Day 77: Aditi is evicted from the house.

Week 12

- Day 78: Baktiyaar left the house in the final week when Big Boss offered any one contestant to take 1 million rupees and leave the show if he is insecure about his victory. Baktiyaar accepted the offer and took the money and left the house. Now the three finalists are Poonam Dhillon, Pravesh Rana and Vindu Dara Singh. The hand grenade, given by Aditi to Bakhtiyar, is transferred to Pravesh.
- Day 79: Pravesh tries to excite Vindu by asking him that why is he acting fake, and throws all the food in the swimming pool.
- Day 81: Pravesh has taken an oath for not drinking water and eating food as a penance for throwing food in the pool.
- Day 84: Vindu wins the car and wins the final of Bigg Boss-Season 3.

== Nominations table ==
	Week 1	Week 2	Week 3	Week 4	Week 5	Week 6	Week 7	Week 8	Week 9	Week 10		Week 11	Week 12		
	Week 1	Week 2	Week 3	Week 4	Week 5	Week 6	Week 7	Week 8	Week 9	Day 64	Day 68	Week 11	Day 78	Day 83	
Vote to:	Evict							Save	Evict						
Vindu	Jaya; Rohit	Poonam; Tannaz	Kamaal; Sherlyn	Sherlyn; Ismail	Bakhtiyar; Tannaz	Bakhtiyar; Tannaz	Banned	Rohit	Pravesh; Claudia	No; Nominations	Aditi	Secret Room (Days 69–70)	Didn't Take; The Money	No; Nominations	Winner (Day 83)
Vindu	Jaya; Rohit	Poonam; Tannaz	Kamaal; Sherlyn	Sherlyn; Ismail	Bakhtiyar; Tannaz	Bakhtiyar; Tannaz	Banned	Rohit	Pravesh; Claudia	No; Nominations	Evicted By; Housemates (Day 68)	Aditi; Poonam	Didn't Take; The Money	No; Nominations	Winner (Day 83)
Pravesh	Not In House					Exempt	Bakhtiyar; Aditi	Rohit	Vindu; Raju	No; Nominations	Vindu	Vindu; Poonam	Didn't Take; The Money	No; Nominations	1st runner-up (Day 83)
Poonam	Kamaal; Rohit	Kamaal; Ismail	Kamaal; Vindu	Ismail; Aditi	Tannaz; Bakhtiyar	Tannaz; Bakhtiyar	Aditi; Pravesh	Vindu	Pravesh; Claudia	No; Nominations	Bakhtiyar	Vindu; Aditi	Didn't Take; The Money	No; Nominations	2nd runner-up (Day 83)
Bakhtiyar	Jaya; Kamaal	Kamaal; Sherlyn	Vindu; Kamaal	Sherlyn; Vindu	Vindu; Ismail	Rohit; Claudia	Rohit; Claudia	Vindu	Vindu; Raju	No; Nominations	Vindu	Vindu; Poonam	Took; The Money	Walked (Day 79)	
Aditi	Sheryn; Jaya	Kamaal; Sherlyn	Kamaal; Sherlyn	Sherlyn; Ismail	Vindu; Ismail	Shamita; Poonam	Pravesh; Vinod	Rohit	Raju; Vindu	No; Nominations	Vindu	Vindu; Poonam	Evicted (Day 75)		
Claudia	Jaya; Ismail	Kamaal; Sherlyn	Kamaal; Sherlyn	Sherlyn; Aditi	Tannaz; Bakhtiyar	Bakhtiyar; Tannaz	Bakhtiyar; Aditi	Rohit	Vindu; Raju	No; Nominations	Pravesh (to save)		Evicted (Day 68)		
Raju	Jaya; Aditi	Poonam; Bakhtiyar	Kamaal; Sherlyn	Sherlyn; Ismail	Tannaz; Bakhtiyar	Shamita; Tannaz	Banned	Aditi	Pravesh; Aditi	Evicted (Day 61)					
Rohit	Jaya; Claudia	Kamaal; Sherlyn	Kamaal; Vindu	Vindu; Sherlyn	Tannaz; Bakhtiyar	Tannaz; Bakhtiyar	Banned	Vindu	Evicted (Day 54)						
Vinod	Not In House					Exempt	Pravesh; Bakhtiyar	Evicted (Day 47)							
Shamita	Jaya; Sherlyn	Kamaal; Sherlyn	Kamaal; Sherlyn	Sherlyn; Vindu	Vindu; Ismail	Rohit; Vindu	Walked (Day 41)								
Tannaz	Jaya; Sherlyn	Kamaal; Sherlyn	Vindu; Sherlyn	Sherlyn; Vindu	Vindu; Ismail	Shamita; Poonam	Evicted (Day 40)								
Ismail	Aditi; Claudia	Tannaz; Bakhtiyar	Tannaz; Bakhtiyar	Tannaz; Bakhtiyar	Tannaz; Bakhtiyar	Evicted (Day 33)									
Sherlyn	Kamaal; Tannaz	Tannaz; Bakhtiyar	Vindu; Kamaal	Vindu; Claudia	Evicted (Day 26)										
Kamaal	Jaya; Poonam	Poonam; Bakhtiyar	Tannaz; Rohit	Ejected (Day 18)			Guest (Days 46-67)								
Jaya	Kamaal; Sherlyn	Evicted (Day 5)													
Notes	None		1	None		2	3	4	5	6	7	8,9	10	None	
Against public vote	Jaya; Kamaal; Sherlyn	Kamaal; Sherlyn	~~Kamaal~~; Sherlyn	Sherlyn; Vindu	Bakhtiyar; Ismail; Tannaz; Vindu	Bakhtiyar; Tannaz	Aditi; Bakhtiyar; Claudia; Pravesh; Rohit; Vinod	Rohit; Vindu	Pravesh; Raju; Vindu	Aditi; Bakhtiyar; Claudia; Poonam; Pravesh; Vindu		Aditi; Bakhtiyar; Poonam; Vindu	Bhakhtyar; Poonam; Pravesh; Vindu	Bakhtiyar; Poonam; Pravesh; Vindu	
Re-entered	None						Kamaal	None				Vindu	None		
Guest	None						Kamaal					None			
Secret Room	None											Vindu	None		
Walked	None					Shamita	None						Bakhtiyar	None	
Ejected	None		Kamaal	None											
Evicted	Jaya	No eviction		Sherlyn	Ismail	Tannaz	Vinod	Rohit	Raju	Claudia		Aditi	No eviction	Poonam	
Evicted	Jaya	No eviction		Sherlyn	Ismail	Tannaz	Vinod	Rohit	Raju	Vindu		Aditi	No eviction	Pravesh	Vindu

Color Key'

indicates the House Captain.
indicates that the Housemate was directly nominated for eviction prior to the regular nominations process.
indicates that the housemate has Re-Entered.
indicates that the person was saved by another housemate.
indicates that the housemate has been granted immunity from nominations.
indicates that the housemate was in the caravan or secret room.
indicates that the housemate entered as a wild card entrant.
indicates that the housemate has been declared as the winner.
indicates that the housemate has been declared as the first runner-up.
indicates that the housemate has been declared as the second runner-up.
indicates the contestant has been evicted.
indicates the contestant has been walked out of the show.
indicates the housemate was ejected.

=== Nomination notes ===
- ^4: On Day 19, there was no eviction post Kamaal's ejection.
- ^5: On Day 41, Shamita left the house post hearing her sister Shilpa Shetty's wedding announcement.
- ^6: Rohit, Raju and Vindu were banned from nominations process for breaking the rules.
- ^7: The housemates had to nomination one housemate for eviction. Later, the housemates had to save one housemate for the ninth week.
- ^8: Bhakhtiyar was saved from nominations after majority saved him.
- ^9: Due to breaking the rules, Bigg Boss nominated all the housemates for eviction.
- ^10: Housemates had to evict one out. As Vindu had the majority votes, he was evicted. But there was a twist, Vindu re-entered the following day and was kept in a secret room.
- ^11: Bhakhtiyar was directly nominated after Vindu voted his name.
- ^12: Post her eviction, Claudia saved Pravesh saving him from nominations.
- ^13: Bhakhtiyar walked out of the house with the bag of money.
