= Rudra Kaushish =

Indian film, television actor and producer

- Born: 25 May 1973 (age 53); Jodhpur, Rajasthan, India
- Occupation: Producer
- Years active: 2009–present

Rudra Kaushish (born Gajendra Oza in Jodhpur, 25 May 1973) is an Indian film and television actor and producer.

== Early life ==
Before joining the film and television industry, Kaushish served as Sub Inspector in Central Reserve Police Force for 12 years from 1995 to 2007.

== Career ==
Rudra worked in feature films and television. He is best known for playing the role of Mahinder Singh Gill in Kulfi Kumar Bajewala.< As a producer he is the head of Rekha G Films.

== Television ==
Year	Serial	Role	Channel
2009	Bhagyavidhaata	Ghanshyam	Colors TV
2008–12	CID	Multiple	Sony Entertainment Television
2012	Yeh Rishta Kya Kehlata Hai	Ranjan	Star Plus
2024	Yeh Rishta Kya Kehlata Hai	Sajjan Rajawat	Star Plus
2012	Adaalat	Nilesh Solanki	Sony Entertainment Television
2012–13	Amrit Manthan	Tej Malik's father	Life OK
2014–2015	Nisha Aur Uske Cousins	Ritesh's father	Star Plus
2016	Rishton Ka Saudagar – Baazigar	Aarav's Fufa	Life OK
2018	Aap Ke Aa Jane Se	Suneel Mathur	Zee TV
2018–2020	Kullfi Kumarr Bajewala	Mahendra Singh Gill	Star Plus
2020	Dadi Amma... Dadi Amma Maan Jaao!	Vikas Pradhan	Star Plus
2021	Teri Laadli Main	Pratap Singh	Star Bharat
2021–2022	Thapki Pyar Ki 2	Mukul Agarwal	Colors TV
2022	Tere Bina Jiya Jaye Na	Maharaj Veerendra Singh Rathore	Zee TV
2024	Kismat Ki Lakiro Se	Anuj Tripathi	Shemaroo Umang
2024	Gehna Zewar Ya Zanjeer	Vikram	Dangal
2025	Bade Ghar ki Choti Bahu	Vibhuti Narayan "Chacha"	Dangal

=== Films ===
Year	Title	Role
2010	Lahore	Judge
2012	Talaash	Samar's Father
2013	Bhadaas	Inspector Dharam
2015	Ranbanka	MLA Prakash Singh
2012	Overtime	Rudra
2015	Shamitabh	Rudra

=== Production ===
Year	Title	Role	Platform	Notes
2020	Ágent Mona 1.0	Producer		Web Series
2020	Anokhi	Producer	MX Player	Short Film
2019	Do Minute	Producer		Web Series
2019	Needs	Producer		Web Series
2020	Family	Producer		Web Series
2020	Ambition	Producer		Web Series
2020	The Last Truth	Producer		Web Series
2021	Chuuppee Rustom	Producer	Ullu	Web Series
2021	Atrangi Ishq	Producer	–	Web Series

== See also ==
- List of Indian television actors
