= Saugandh (1991 film) =

1991 film by Raj Sippy

- Poster
- Directed by: Raj Sippy
- Written by: Iqbal Durrani; P. D. Mehra
- Produced by: Lal Purswani; Ashok Adnani
- Starring: Rakhee; Akshay Kumar; Shantipriya; Mukesh Khanna
- Cinematography: Arvind Laad
- Edited by: V. N. Mayekar
- Music by: Anand–Milind
- Production company: Tridev Films
- Release date: 25 January 1991
- Running time: 128 minutes
- Country: India
- Language: Hindi
- Box office: ₹2 crore

Saugandh (transl. Pledge) is a 1991 Indian Hindi-language action film directed by Raj N. Sippy. It stars Akshay Kumar in his film debut (as a leading actor), alongside Shanthipriya (in her Hindi debut).

== Plot ==
Sarang Singh is a proud, arrogant, and powerful landlord who refuses to let people garland him, believing a man should never bow his head. He adores his little sister Chand, and she falls in love with Shiva. Shiva is from an agricultural background family and has a loving family—father, mother, sister, brother, and most importantly, his sister-in-law, Ganga, who adores him. Sarang learns of the romance and kills Shiva, Chand, and everyone in Shiva's family. However, Ganga, who was pregnant at the time, had just fainted. She makes an oath /saugandh that she will make Sarang bow his head. She challenges Sarang that she will have a son and Sarang will have a daughter and that her son will become Sarang's son-in-law and will make him bow his head. Sarang accepts the challenge and declares that he will kill her son when that day comes. Her son is named Shiva Kirplani, and Sarang names his daughter Chand. Chand is brought up as a ruthless guy rather than a girl. Shiva and Chand meet. Chand hates Shiva initially, and they fall in love soon enough. Ranveer Singh also wants to marry Chand to punish her for insulting him but fails as Chand and Shiva marry in the end; however, Sarang, being the proud man that he is, refuses to accept defeat and commits suicide.

== Cast ==
- Raakhee as Ganga Kirplani
- Akshay Kumar as Shiva Kirplani
  - Aryeman Ramsay as young Shiva
- Shantipriya as Chand
- Pankaj Dheer as Ranveer Singh
- Mukesh Khanna as Chaudhary Sarang
- Mayur Verma as Shiva
- Amita Nangia as Chand
- Roopa Ganguly as Rajhaa
- Beena Banerjee as Shanti
- Paintal as Bajrangi
- Arun Bali as Hari Singh
- Aloka Mukherjee as Pinky

== Soundtrack ==
Saugandh

Soundtrack album by Anand–Milind
- Released: 1990
- Genre: Feature film soundtrack
- Label: T-Series

Sameer wrote all songs except "Mitwa Mere Saath Main Tere" which was penned by Anand Bakshi.

No.	Title	Singer(s)	Length
1.	"Teri Baahon Mein Jeena Hai"	Mohammad Aziz, Anuradha Paudwal	06:14
2.	"Laila Ko Bhool Jayenge (version 1)"	Mohammad Aziz, Anuradha Paudwal	06:57
3.	"Meri Neend Churakar Le Gayi"	Udit Narayan, Anuradha Paudwal	06:18
4.	"Haar Gaya Dil Fariyaad Karke"	Anuradha Paudwal, Anup Jalota, Pramila	05:26
5.	"Mera Kehna Maan Sitamgar"	Anuradha Paudwal	06:40
6.	"Shivam Shivam"	Anuradha Paudwal	06:03
7.	"Mitwa Mere Saath Main Tere"	Mohammad Aziz, Anuradha Paudwal
8.	"Aa Bhi Jaa Mahiya"	Debashish Dasgupta, Anuradha Paudwal
9.	"Laila Ko Bhool Jayenge (version 2)"	Mohammad Aziz, Anuradha Paudwal
10.	"Ek Doosre Mein Aao"	Anand, Anuradha Paudwal
Total length:			39:54
