= Good Luck! =

- Theatrical release poster
- Directed by: Aditya Datt
- Screenplay by: Sanjay Chhel; Vibha Singh; Sai Kabir
- Story by: Rajan Agarwal
- Produced by: Karan Sharma; Jagdish Sharma
- Starring: Aryeman Ramsay; Sayali Bhagat; Ranvir Shorey; Lucky Ali
- Edited by: Irfan Shaikh
- Music by: Anu Malik
- Distributed by: Tips Music Films; Om Films Pvt. Ltd.
- Release date: 8 August 2008
- Country: India
- Language: Hindi

Good Luck! is an Indian film directed by Aditya Datt, starring Sayali Bhagat and Aryeman Ramsay. Produced jointly by Karan Sharma and Jagdish Sharma, the film also features Lucky Ali and Ranvir Shorey in supporting roles. It is inspired by the Hollywood film, Just My Luck. The film was released on 8 August 2008.

== Synopsis ==
The film is about a singer/dancer, Vicky Verma (Aryeman Ramsay). While he was a top student in his school and college days, he is not having much luck finding work, clients, or projects. All he does seems to go wrong. Afterwards, Saba (Sayali Bhagat), one of the luckiest girls in the city, meets Vicky at a masked party, and the two kiss, which swaps their luck around. Vicky gets as lucky as hell, and Saba gets jinxed. After she finds out that her luck changed due to that kiss, Saba goes out looking for Vicky, even though she has never seen his face because he was wearing a mask at the party when they kissed. Vicky gets signed a contract deal by Tarun Chopra (Lucky Ali), but it's later cancelled when Saba finds him and kisses him to get the luck back. She goes to work, only to get fired, knowing that Vicky was going to use the luck not on him but on his little cousin, who has a heart problem. She once again kisses him to give him the luck back, and Vicky kisses his little cousin, and she gets all the luck. After he does that, he ends up winning Saba's love and admiration. After Saba and Vicky get together, Vicky and Saba's lives change, and they become prosperous.

== Songs ==
1. "Good Luck" - Sunidhi Chauhan, Adnan Sami
2. "Good Luck" (club mix) - Sunidhi Chauhan, Adnan Sami
3. "Main Sajda" - Shilpa Rao, Sukhwinder Singh
4. "Main Sajda" V2 - Shilpa Rao, Sukhwinder Singh
5. "Nazar Mein Hai Chehra" - Lucky Ali, Vasundhara Das
6. "Nazar Mein Hai Chehra" (hip hop mix) - Lucky Ali, Vasundhara Das
7. "Soniya Aaja Ni" - Krishna Beura
8. "Soniya Aaja Ni" (club mix) - Krishna Beura

== Cast ==
- Aryeman Ramsay as Vicky Varma; a jinxed 25-year-old singer looking for a contract deal
- Sayali Bhagat as Saba; a charmed hard-worker
- Lucky Ali as Tarun Chopra; a rich musical contract dealer
- Ranvir Shorey as Javed; a Jig lo
- Nazneen Patel as Kanchan Soni
- Archana Puran Singh in special appearance
- Sharat Saxena in special appearance
- Viju Khote in special appearance
