= Family (2006 film) =

2006 Indian Hindi-language action thriller film

- Theatrical release poster
- Directed by: Rajkumar Santoshi
- Screenplay by: Rajat Arora; Shridhar Raghavan; Rajkumar Santoshi
- Dialogues by: Rajkumar Santoshi; Tigmanshu Dhulia
- Story by: Shaktimaan Talwar; Ashok Raut
- Produced by: Keshu Ramsay
- Starring: Amitabh Bachchan; Akshay Kumar; Bhumika Chawla; Aryeman Ramsay
- Cinematography: Ashok Mehta
- Edited by: Shyam Salgoankar
- Music by: Ram Sampath
- Production company: DMS Films Private Limited
- Release date: 13 January 2006
- Running time: 154 minutes
- Country: India
- Language: Hindi
- Budget: ₹25 crore
- Box office: ₹14.59 crore

Family (also known as Family – Ties of Blood) is a 2006 Indian Hindi-language action thriller film directed by Rajkumar Santoshi. The film stars Amitabh Bachchan, Akshay Kumar, Bhumika Chawla and Aryeman Ramsay. It was released on 13 January 2006.

== Plot ==
Viren Sahi (Amitabh Bachchan) is an underworld don based out of Bangkok. Viren's spoilt brat Abhir (Sushant Singh) is attacked by his rival Khan (Kader Khan) and Viren seeks revenge. He receives foolproof information that Khan and his nephew will be present at a local cinema theatre on a particular date, and he sets off to India to kill both of them.

The story then moves in the present onto the life of a kind-hearted simple canteen owner, Shekhar Bhatia (Akshay Kumar) who married his wife Dr. Kavita (Bhumika Chawla). Shekhar lives with his parents, his wife, and his younger brother Aryan. One day Aryan runs away from home and Shekhar searches the whole city to find him. During his search he witnesses Viren attacking Khan's nephew in the cinema theatre causing a stampede and decides to help the innocent people in the cinema. Whilst helping the innocent people. Shekhar finds Khan's nephew fatally wounded and tries to take him to the hospital. Viren shoots Shekhar, thinking him to be Khan's man. as Shekhar tries to return home he ends up getting hit by Viren's car leading him dying as Aryan returns home and learns that Shekhar was killed when he set out to search for him.

An enraged and shocked Aryan and his group of friends form a gang and kidnap Viren's entire family, including Abhir, with the idea of bringing Viren to Mumbai and seeking justice. Viren leaves no stone unturned to find out who dared do this. Each time he zeroes in on the gang, they manage to escape with the hostages. Abhir escapes and reaches his father. Aryan tries not to harm any of Viren's family members as he knows how precious a family is. However, Viren's wife suddenly dies when Abhir comes back to recover his family by himself with his gang, and accidentally shoots her while targeting Aryan. Aryan calls Viren to meet him at the same place where Viren killed Shekhar, along with the police. But the police help Viren; thus, Aryan's plan fails. Aryan and his friends are taken into custody.

After constant pleading by his daughter and daughter in law, a changed Viren decides to end it all and surrenders to the police on the condition that his son will be de-implicated in his crimes. After cremating his wife, he also tells them to release Aryan and his friends, but the latter are so enraged that they set out to kill Viren. Viren, in the meantime, is in for the shock of his life when corrupt cops come out with the intention of killing him in an encounter at the behest of his own son Abhir, who apparently has now teamed up with Khan. An intense gun battle ensues between Viren, Aryan, and the gangsters, where Viren kills the corrupt cops, Viren saved Abhir from being killed by Aryan, but Abhir treacherously tries to shoot his father, and Viren ends up killing Abhir. Viren demands that Aryan kill him, but Aryan tells him that Viren's punishment is not death, rather it is life itself, as Viren has nothing left to live for. He simply throws his gun and walks away with his friends, with a now apparently devastated and insane Viren looking on and muttering.

The film ends on a note on karma and Aryan managing Shekhar's canteen with his friends, as the end credits roll.

== Cast ==
- Amitabh Bachchan as Virendra "Viren" Sahi, a dreaded gangster living in Bangkok, Abhir and Smita's father and Sharda's husband
- Akshay Kumar as Shekhar Bhatia, Kishore and Vimla's elder son, Aryan's elder brother, Kavita's husband
- Bhumika Chawla as Dr. Kavita Bhatia, Shekhar's wife
- Aryeman Ramsay as Aryan Bhatia, Kishore and Vimla's younger son, Shekhar's younger brother
- Sushant Singh as Abhir Sahi, Viren and Sharda's son, Smita's brother
- Bhavna as Smita Sahi, Viren and Sharda's daughter, Abhir's sister
- Aanjjan Srivastav as Kishore Bhatia, Shekhar and Aryan's father
- Bharati Achrekar as Vimla Bhatia, Shekhar and Aryan's mother
- Shernaz Patel as Sharda Sahi, Viren's wife, Abhir and Smita's mother
- Rujuta Deshmukh as Ashwini, Abhir's wife
- Ali Haji as Mohit, Abhir's son
- Sunil Grover as Aryan's friend
- Nawazuddin Siddiqui as Nawaz, Aryan's friend
- Kamlesh Sawant as Shekhar's friend
- Kader Khan as Karim Khan, Viren's arch-rival
- Jahangir Khan as Feroz Khan, Karim's nephew
- Gulshan Grover as Babubhai Bichhoo, a gangster hired by Abhir
- Raza Murad as Saeed Ali, Viren and Karim's mentor
- Viju Khote as Haider Chacha, Kishore's close friend

== Soundtrack ==
Family

Soundtrack album by Ram Sampath
- Released: 28 November 2005
- Recorded: Studio Satya (Mumbai)
- Genre: Feature film soundtrack
- Label: T-Series

The film's score and songs were composed by Ram Sampath, with the lyrics written by Sameer. The official soundtrack contains seven songs and two reprise versions. The song "Janam Janam", performed by Various Artists, was not used in the film.

=== Track listing ===
No.	Title	Performer(s)	Length
1.	"Qatra Qatra"	Arnab Chakrabarty, Sowmya Raoh	3:06
2.	"Pyaar Bina"	Suhail Kaul, Ernie	3:32
3.	"Jeene Do"	Suhail Kaul	2:59
4.	"Lori"	Sona Mohapatra	3:32
5.	"Pyaar Bina – 2"	Suhail Kaul, Ernie	3:32
6.	"Janam Janam"	Shailendra, Suhail Kaul, Arnab Chakraborty, Somya Rao, Madhushri	4:31
7.	"Qatra Qatra – 2"	Arnab Chakrabarty, Sowmya Raoh	3:09
8.	"Family Theme"	Prakash	2:37
9.	"Quick Byte" (Acoustic)	Arnab Chakrabarty	1:50
