= Ranbanka =

- Theatrical release poster
- Directed by: Aryeman Ramsay
- Written by: Shakir Ali
- Screenplay by: Shakir Ali
- Story by: Shakir Ali
- Produced by: Ajay Yadav, Dasrath Singh Rathore & Suman Shukla
- Starring: Manish Paul; Ravi Kishan; Pooja Thakur; Rudra Kaushish; Avinash Dwivedi
- Edited by: Komal Verma
- Music by: Songs; Sahil Rayyan; Mohammad Irfan; Sahil Rayyan; MamtaSharma; Madhuri; Srivastva; Background Score: Sahil Rayyan
- Production companies: Serene Films & Vintage Movies
- Distributed by: White Lion Films
- Release date: 6 November 2015
- Running time: 98 minutes
- Country: India
- Language: Hindi

Ranbanka (transl. Warrior) is a 2015 Indian Hindi-language action film produced by Serene Movies & Vintage Films and directed by Aryeman Ramsay. The film features Manish Paul, Pooja Thakur, Ravi Kishan, Rudra Kaushish and Avinash Dwivedi in the lead roles. Manish Paul plays the lead role of the protagonist, while Ravi Kishan and Avinash Dwivedi played the role of the antagonists. The film has its backdrop set in Mathura. This is also Manish Paul's first action film. Ranbanka is a Rajasthani word, which means "a warrior". The film narrates the story of Rahul's pain and the way he fights against Raghav, the most feared goon of Mathura.

The film was released on 6 November 2015, in about 700 screens all over India.

== Plot ==
Rahul Sharma (Manish Paul), who is an engineer working in Mumbai, comes to Mathura, a city in Uttar Pradesh with his wife Priya (Pooja Thakur) and child Aayush. While entering the town, the driver tells him about the most feared man in Mathura, Raghav (Ravi Kishan) and that he should stay away from him in case they cross paths. Raghav sees Priya one day and falls in love with her. One night when Raghav comes to Priya's house, he demands that she must marry him or else he will kill her husband and child. Rahul tries to seek help from Raghav's brother, and he tries his best to help him. But Raghav doesn't rest and kills Rahul's son.

A frustrated Priya tells a heartbroken Rahul to kill Raghav; his silence won't do anything. Rahul then turns into an angry man, and starts eliminating Raghav's men. One day, Raghav's friend Kantu kidnaps Priya and brings her to Raghav. But Priya cautions him to stop, otherwise, he'll face his death. Seeing the chance, Rahul fires at Raghav, who in turn shoots a man named Madhav Ram, thinking his MLA brother had sent him to kill him. Enraged, he gets his brother killed in a blast. Later, Rahul reveals that it was he who had fired at him, and not Madhav Ram. Raghav then goes out to search for him. In the meanwhile, Rahul arrives on the spot to rescue Priya, and a fight follows between him and Kantu, in which Rahul kills Kantu, and heads to kill Raghav. A rough fight takes place between Rahul and Raghav, in which Raghav overpowers Rahul and nearly tries to kill him. But soon, Rahul's mind is filled with the pain of his son's loss, and his waves of anger suddenly breaks out. He starts to fight again and, this time overpowers Raghav. The film ends as Rahul cries along with Priya, after he kills Raghav.

== Cast ==
- Manish Paul as Rahul Sharma
- Pooja Thakur as Priya
- Ravi Kishan as Raghav
- Avinash Dwivedi as Kantu
- Rudra Kaushish as Prakash Singh as MLA of Mathura
- Navi Bhangu for ' Kanha Re' song

== Production ==
Manish Paul shot for the film in a jail of Mathura. Pooja Thakur made her Bollywood debut with this film.

== Soundtrack ==
Ranbanka

Soundtrack album by Sahil Rayyan
- Released: 2015
- Recorded: 2015
- Genre: Feature film soundtrack, Soundtrack
- Length: 14:13
- Language: Hindi
- Label: Zee Music Company
- Producer: Sahil Rayyan

Tracklist
No.	Title	Lyrics	Singer(s)	Length
1.	"Kanha Re"	Tanveer Ghazi	Sahil Rayyan, Desh Gaurav, Mohammed Irfan	03:41
2.	"Marjaana Menu Marjaana"	Salim Ashfee	Sam, Madhavi Srivastav	04:42
3.	"Holi Diwani Aayi Re"	Tanveer Ghazi	Swati Rajput	04:57
4.	"Ishaq Ka Garam Masala"	Arafat Mehmood	Mamta Sharma, Desh Gaurav	3:56
Total length:				14:13

== Release ==
Ranbanka got a U/A certificate from the Indian Censor Board with a runtime of 98 minutes. The film was released on 6 November 2015.

== Reception ==
Ranbanka received mixed to positive reviews from critics. Behindwoods rated the film 4/5, writing, "On the whole, RANBANKA is a solid action film that is likely to work among action loving audiences, along with fans of Manish Paul, who would surely love him. You can of course watch this film. I am willing to watch it again. As I said previously, RANBANKA and BADLAPUR can't be compared, so don't keep in mind as if you are watching a BADLAPUR. Watch it not as a second BADLAPUR, but as the first RANBANKA. Strongly Recommended!" FilmyTown rated the film 3/5, writing " Keshu Ramsay’s (of Ramsay Brother’s horror film makers of yesteryears fame) son Aryeman makes his directorial debut with this action thriller, which is an above average action thriller."

== Box office ==
Ranbanka collected ₹6,00,000 on its opening day. On its second day, the film collected ₹8,00,000 and on its third day, it minted ₹10,00,000. Overall, Ranbanka collected ₹25,00,000 in its first week at the Indian Box Office.
