= Bhadaas =

- Directed by: Ajay Yadav
- Story by: Ajay Yadav
- Produced by: Ajay Yadav
- Starring: Meera; Aryeman Ramsay; Shree Rajput; Anant Mahadevan; Rudra Kaushik; Ashutosh Kaushik; Mushtaq Khan; Shiva Rindan; Gargi Patel
- Edited by: Karan Varia, Vaibhav Waman
- Music by: Shabab Azmi
- Distributed by: Serene Films
- Release date: 27 December 2013
- Country: India
- Language: Hindi

Bhadaas is a 2013 Hindi thriller film directed and produced by Ajay Yadav. The film was released on 27 December 2013. The film features Meera, Aryeman Ramsay, Shree Rajput and Anant Mahadevan as main characters.

== Story ==
The story of the movie revolves around three principal characters: a young girl called Daisy, Police inspector Vijay and Assistant Commissioner's daughter Neha. The plot of the story theme develops with the sudden disappearance of men every full-moon night, leaving in its wake panic and terror. The mystery in the whodunit deepens as the cops set a trap to nab the perpetrator. Although slated for release on 24 May 2013, Director Ajay Yadav announces its theatre premiere for 28 June 2013.

== Cast ==
- Meera Naveed
- Ashutosh Kaushik
- Aryeman Ramsay
- Shree Rajput
- Anant Mahadevan
- Rudra Kaushik
- Mushtaq Khan
- Shiva Rindan
- Gargi Patel
