= Carol Gracias =

Indian super model

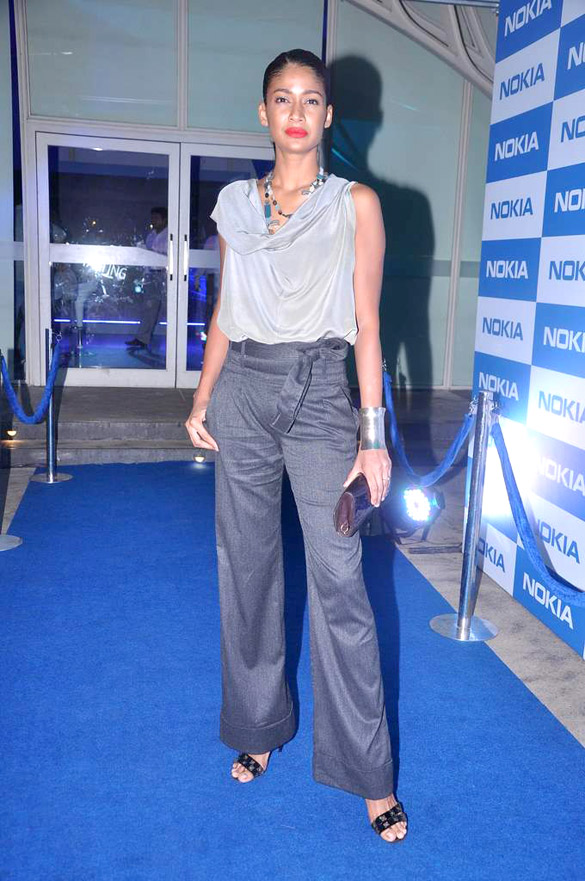
- Gracias in July 2012
- Born: 28 December 1978 (age 47); Mumbai
- Occupation: Model
- Years active: 2005–2010
- Known for: Bigg Boss 1

Carol Gracias is an Indian super model. She is a past winner of the coveted India's L'Oréal/Elite Look of the Year title. In 2006, she participated and became the runner-up in the reality show Bigg Boss 1.

== Early life ==
Carol Gracias was brought up in Goan Catholic family in Mumbai.

== Career ==
=== Film career ===
Carol played a cameo role in the movie Being Cyrus. She also appeared in the music video for the song "Right Here Right Now" in the movie Bluffmaster!, starring Abhishek Bachchan. She was a contestant on Bigg Boss 1, the Indian version of Celebrity Big Brother where she became the 1st runner-up. She also participated in Fear Factor: Khatron Ke Khiladi 2, the Indian version of Fear Factor and emerged as the 2nd runner-up.. She starred as a bar maid in a hotel, in a much liked music video, sung by Punjabi singer Surjit Bindrakhia, called, Mukhda Dekh Ke, released on August 5, 1999 by Atul Sharma.

=== Wardrobe Malfunction ===
During the 2006 Lakme Fashion Week in Mumbai, Carol Gracias experienced a "wardrobe malfunction", when her halter top slipped off, completely exposing her breasts. She recovered quickly enough and completed the walk, holding her top in place. This minor incident caused a huge furor, with some members of the public accusing the organisers of the show of promoting obscenity. The matter was raised in the Maharashtra Legislative Assembly, where the members condemned the organisers of the show.

Later, a local court ordered the police to investigate the incident, after a social activist, Prakash Rajdev, registered an FIR against the organisers of Lakme India Fashion Week and the models involved, alleging that the incidents were intentional and the models indulged in "nudity and obscenity" which constituted offences under the Indian Penal Code.

== Filmography ==
Year	Film	Role	Notes
2005	Being Cyrus	Girl in Dream/Beggar Girl	Cameo
2005	Bluffmaster	Dancer	Appeared in the music video for the song "Right Here Right Now".
2015	Aisa Yeh Jahaan	Dancer	Appeared in the music video for the song "We Go Party"

=== Television ===
Year	Name	Role	Notes	Ref
2006–2007	Bigg Boss 1	Contestant	1st runner-up	
2009	Fear Factor: Khatron Ke Khiladi 2	Contestant	2nd runner-up	
