= Ashutosh Kaushik =

Indian actor and reality TV participant

- Born: 1981 or 1982; Saharanpur, Uttar Pradesh, India
- Years active: 2007–Present
- Spouse: Arpita Kaushik (m. 2020)
- Children: 1 son

Ashutosh Kaushik (born 1981 or 1982) is an Indian actor and reality TV participant. Kaushik was the winner of MTV Hero Honda Roadies 5.0 in 2007 and the 2nd season of Bigg Boss in 2008. Later he was also seen in MTV Roadies 8. He has had a role in the movies Zila Ghaziabad and Kismat Love Paisa Dilli.

== Filmography ==
| Films | Year |
|---|---|
| Chal Jaa Bapu | 2016 |
| Laal Rang | 2016 |
| Love Ke Funday | 2016 |
| Pitamah | 2016 |
| Zila Ghaziabad | 2013 |
| Bhadaas | 2013 |
| Shortcut Romeo | 2013 |
| Kismat Love Paisa Dilli | 2012 |

=== Television ===
| Year | Name | Role | Channel | Notes | Ref |
|---|---|---|---|---|---|
| 2007 | MTV Roadies 5 | Contestant | MTV India | Winner | |
| 2008 | Bigg Boss 2 | Contestant | Colors TV | Winner | |

== Personal life ==
In 2009, Kaushik was arrested for riding a motorbike under the influence of alcohol. He was found guilty, fined, sentenced to one day in jail, and his license was suspended. In the 2021, he had gone to court asking for the incident to be expunged from the internet under the right to be forgotten.

In 2020, Kaushik married Arpita, a banker.
