= Bigg Boss (Hindi TV series) season 2 =

Coordinates: 18°44′38″N 73°24′38″E

Bigg Boss
- Season 2
- Title card of season 2
- Presented by: Shilpa Shetty
- No. of days: 97
- No. of housemates: 15
- Winner: Ashutosh Kaushik
- Runner-up: Raja Chaudhary
- No. of episodes: 99

Release
- Original network: Colors TV
- Original release: 17 August – 22 November 2008

Season chronology
- ← Previous; Season 1 Next → Season 3

Bigg Boss 2, also known as Bigg Boss 2: Iss Nazar Se Kaun Bachega, is the second season of the Indian reality TV programme Bigg Boss. Hosted by Bollywood actress and producer Shilpa Shetty, the second season began airing on 21 August 2008 on Colors TV. The housemates, considered strangers to each other, spent 98 days locked up together under one roof under the 24×7 supervision of 32 cameras fitted around the Bigg Boss house.

On the second day of the show, the British guest on exchange in the house, Jade Goody, walked out of the Bigg Boss house due to the revelation that she had developed cancer. On Day 30 of the show, an additional entry to the house was made in the form of Diana Hayden, who was the fifteenth contestant of the reality game show. The show topped the rating charts in its last week due to a voluntary exit by a popular housemate, Rahul Mahajan.

The season lasted for 98 continuous days in total, ending with the finale on 22 November 2008. Ashutosh Kaushik emerged as the winner with an award of Rs. 1 crore. Raja Chaudhary was the runner-up of the show. Rahul Mahajan won the Aveo UVA car as he was selected as the Bada Dilwala (One with big heart) of the show.

== Production ==
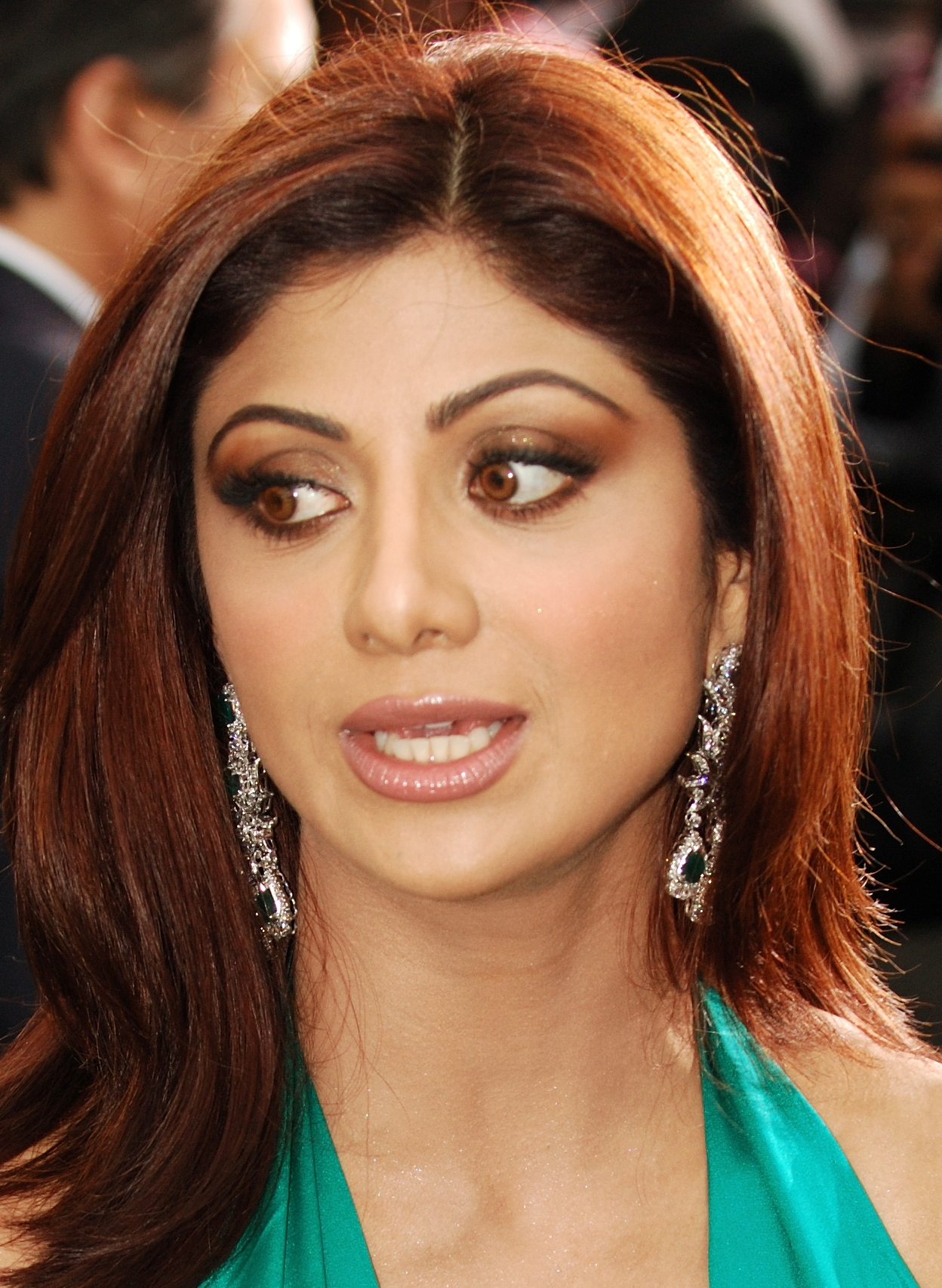
Shilpa Shetty became the new host for the series.

The show is based on the Big Brother format developed by John de Mol. A number of contestants (known as "housemates") lived in a purpose-built house and were isolated from the rest of the world. Each week, housemates nominated two of their peers for eviction, and the housemates who received the most nominations would face a public vote. Of these, one would eventually leave, having been "evicted" from the House. However, there were exceptions to this process as dictated by Bigg Boss. In the final week, there were three housemates remaining, and the public voted for who they wanted to win.

Tasks were set by Bigg Boss each week. The housemates were allowed to gamble on task outcomes and were rewarded with extra money to order more supplies if they won.

== Housemates status ==
Sr	Housemate	Day entered	Day exited	Status
1	Ashutosh	Day 1	Day 90	Walked
1	Ashutosh	Day 90	Day 97	Winner
2	Raja	Day 1	Day 90	Walked
2	Raja	Day 91	Day 97	1st runner-up
3	Zulfi	Day 1	Day 90	Walked
3	Zulfi	Day 91	Day 97	2nd runner-up
4	Rahul	Day 1	Day 90	Walked
4	Rahul	Day 91	Day 93	Ejected
5	Monica	Day 1	Day 19	Evicted
5	Monica	Day 49	Day 89	Evicted
6	Diana	Day 30	Day 78	Evicted
7	Debojit	Day 1	Day 70	Evicted
8	Ehsaan	Day 1	Day 63	Evicted
9	Payal	Day 1	Day 54	Evicted
9	Payal	Day 78	Day 84	Guest
10	Sambhavna	Day 1	Day 47	Evicted
10	Sambhavna	Day 78	Day 84	Guest
11	Alina	Day 1	Day 33	Evicted
12	Ketki	Day 1	Day 26	Evicted
13	Rakhi	Day 1	Day 12	Evicted
14	Sanjay	Day 1	Day 7	Evicted
15	Jade	Day 1	Day 2	Walked

== Housemates ==
=== Original entrants ===
The participants in the order of appearance and entrance in the house are:

- Ketki Dave – Television actress. She is popular for her role of Daksha Virani in Ekta Kapoor's show Kyunki Saas Bhi Kabhi Bahu Thi.
- Zulfi Syed – Model and actor. He starred in Akbar Khan's Taj Mahal and the controversial movie "Deshdrohi". Zulfi also played small roles in other Bollywood movies.
- Raja Chaudhary – Actor. He has appeared in many Bhojpuri films. He was in a controversial relationship with Shweta Tiwari whom he later divorced.
- Monica Bedi – Actress. She is a former starlet and the former partner of underworld don Abu Salem. She appeared in movies like Jodi No. 1, Jaanam Samjha Karo and Pyaar Ishq Aur Mohabbat.
- Rahul Mahajan – Political leader. He is a former pilot and the only son of politician Pramod Mahajan. He was reportedly admitted to a hospital for drugs overdose right after his father's death in May 2006. In a more recent controversy, his newly wedded wife Shweta claimed that she was being abused by Rahul. In August 2008, two weeks before him joining Bigg Boss they got divorced.
- Rakhi Vijan – Actress She is known for her roles in the show Hum Paanch and film Golmaal Returns.
- Sambhavna Seth – Actress and Item girl.
- Ehsaan Qureshi – Stand-up comedian. He participated in the reality show The Great Indian Laughter Challenge and became a finalist.
- Alina Wadiwala – Model.
- Payal Rohatgi – Model and actress. She has appeared in films like Yeh Kya Ho Raha Hai?, 36 China Town and Heyy Babyy. She participated in Fear Factor: Khatron Ke Khiladi 1.
- Debojit Saha – Singer. He participated and became the winner of Zee TV's singing reality show Sa Re Ga Ma Pa Challenge 2005.
- Ashutosh Kaushik – Model and reality TV actor. He participated and became the winner of MTV Roadies in 2007.
- Sanjay Nirupam – Politician. He is a politician and a member of the Congress (I) Party.
- Jade Goody – British television personality. She participated in the reality show Big Brother UK 3 (2002). She later participated in Celebrity Big Brother in its fifth season where she was in an international racist controversy after she bullied fellow housemate Shilpa Shetty, along with two other contestants Danielle Lloyd and Jo O'Meara. She died in March 2009 due to cervical cancer.

=== Wild card entrants ===
- Diana Hayden – Model. She became the winner of Miss World and runner up of Miss India in 1997.

== Guest appearances ==
Week	Day	Guest(s)	Purpose of Visit	Ref(s)
1	Day 5	Tusshar Kapoor & Ekta Kapoor	To promote their film C Kkompany	
2	Day 12	Anupam Kher	To promote his film Tahaan	
3	Day 19	Rajniesh Duggal & Adah Sharma	To promote their film 1920	
4	Day 26	Amrita Rao	To promote her film Welcome to Sajjanpur	
5	Day 33	Sania Wadiwala	To surprise and support sister Alina	
6	Day 40	Abhishek Bachchan	To promote his film Drona	
7	Day 47	Sohail Khan	To promote his film Hello	
8	Day 54	Urmila Matondkar	To promote her film Karzzzz	
9	Day 61	Salman Khan & Preity Zinta	To promote their film Heroes	
10	Day 69	Ajay Devgan & Kareena Kapoor	To promote their film Golmaal Returns	
11	Day 76	Arjun Rampal & Malaika Arora	To promote their film EMI - Liya Hai Toh Chukana Parega	
12	Days 78–84	Payal Rohatgi & Sambhavna Seth	Special appearances	
12	Day 82	Karan Johar, John Abraham & Priyanka Chopra	To promote their film Dostana	
13	Days 87–88	Shakuntala Bedi (Monica's mother)	To see their loved ones on Family Week	
13	Days 87–88	Poonam Mahajan (Rahul's sister)	To see their loved ones on Family Week	
13	Days 87–88	Biquar Syed (Zufli's brother)	To see their loved ones on Family Week	
13	Day 89	Salman Khan & Katrina Kaif	To promote their film Yuvvraaj	
14	Day 96	Ravi Kishan	Special appearance	
14	Day 97	Akshay Kumar	To promote his film Jumbo	

== Weekly summary ==
The main events in the house are summarised in the table below. A typical week began with nominations, followed by the shopping task, and then the eviction of a housemate during the Saturday episode. Evictions, tasks, and other events for a particular week are noted in order of sequence.

Week 1	Entrances	Day 1: Ketki, Zulfi, Raja, Monica, Rahul, Rakhi, Sambhavna, Ehsaan, Alina, Payal, Debojit, Ashutosh, Sanjay and Jade entered the main house.
Week 1	Nominations	Day 2: Bigg Boss announced the first nominations where the housemates have to go in the confession room and tell which two housemates they would like to nominate to evict. Jade and Payal both safe as they both won immunity task so no housemate nominated them. As a result; Raja and Sanjay were nominated for this the first week's eviction.
Week 1	Tasks	Truth or Dare: The housemates were asked by Bigg Boss to sit and form a circle and spin an arrow for the task of paying the game Truth or Dare. The person towards whom the arrow points, has to either answer a question posed by the opposite person or do a daring task set by him/her.
Week 1	Reward	After winning the first task, Jade and Payal were saved from eviction.
Week 1	Twists	—N/a
Week 1	Exits	Day 2: Jade Goody walked out of the house after hearing about her cancer.; Day 5: Sanjay Nirupam was evicted from the house after facing the public vote.
Week 2	Nominations	Day 8: Nominations were announced and again had to pick two housemates to evict. As a result; Rahul and Rakhi were nominated for the second week's eviction.
Week 2	Tasks	Janmastami: Aligning with the actual celebrations of Krishna Janmastami, Bigg Boss directed all housemates to celebrate the festival inside the house also. Rahul and Payal were appointed as Krishna and Radha respectively, and the rest were to rever them and provide seva.
Week 2	Punishments	—N/a
Week 2	Reward	—N/a
Week 2	Twists	—N/a
Week 2	Exits	Day 12: Rakhi Vijan was evicted from the house after facing the public vote.
Week 3	Nominations	Day 15: Nominations were announced and again had to pick two housemates to evict. As a result; Monica and Rahul were nominated for the third week's eviction.
Week 3	Tasks	Sarkar: Housemates were asked by Bigg Boss to vote for and form a Sarkar (government) within the house by contesting an election between any two housemates with the help of one supporter each. Sambhavna and Raja were selected by the members as the two candidates. Ahsaan was chosen as a supported by Raja, and Rahul became the supporter of Sambhavna. The task was successful and Raja got elected as the leader and was called Sarkar Raja.; Bigg Boss Song: Bigg Boss gave all house mates a task of composing a song for Bigg Boss Season 2 where Ahsaan, a poet and stand-up comic, was asked to write the lyrics and Debojit, a singer by profession, was to compose and sing the song along with the rest of the housemates.
Week 3	Punishments	Ashutosh, Alina and Sambhavana were not allowed to nominate this week as punishment from Bigg Boss for breaking house rules.
Week 3	Reward	—N/a
Week 3	Twists	Open nominations: In a surprising move for all housemates, Bigg Boss decided to have the nomination process in the group where each member had to nominate two people for eviction and also state reasons for doing so.
Week 3	Exits	Day 19: Monica Bedi was evicted from the house after facing the public vote.
Week 4	Entrances	Day 29: Diana Hayden entered as the first wild card entrant.
Week 4	Nominations	Day 22: Nominations were announced and again had to pick two housemates to evict. As a result; Alina, Ketki, Payal and Zulfi were nominated for the fourth week's eviction.
Week 4	Tasks	Pathshala: Bigg Boss directed all housemates towards a three-day task of creating a Pathshala (school) in the house. Alina, Rahul, Raja, Sambhavna and Zulfi were to role-play of school children. The remaining housemates were to play the role of teachers. Ketaki was appointed vice-principal and was a PT teacher, Ehsaan was the teacher for Hindi literature, Debojit played the role of music teacher and Payal was appointed as dancing teacher. Ashutosh was appointed by Bigg Boss as the principal of the school. For three days all students were to participate in at least one class every day by each teacher. The third day was set as the day of the exam, where the best student was to be awarded. Sambhavna was unanimously selected as the best student by all teachers.
Week 4	Punishments	
Week 4	Reward	—N/a
Week 4	Twists	Through the successful weekly task of being the leader Bigg Boss gave Raja a special privilege to name one person who would be nominated for eviction for week four irrespective of nomination vote-count.
Week 4	Exits	Day 26: Ketki Dave was evicted from the house after facing the public vote.
Week 5	Nominations	Day 30: Nominations were announced and again had to pick two housemates to evict. As a result; Alina, Raja and Sania were nominated for the fifth week's eviction.
Week 5	Tasks	Kabaddi: Bigg Boss assigns Kabaddi day task to the housemates. He informs them that for this, they have to form two teams with four members each and select one person as a referee. Furthermore the captain of the winning team in every round will get Rs 500. And all this will take place in the garden area but since it is raining, they can do this in the gym area. Sambhavana is the captain of the team composed of Raja, Zulfi and Debojit whereas Rahul is the captain of the team composed of Payal, Ashutosh and Alina.; Paani Bachao: Bigg Boss calls Ashutosh in the confession room and gives the task. The task assigned is 'Paani Bachao', a weekly and 24 hours task. A tank full of water has been provided to the housemates in the garden area. The tank has 4 holes and four stoppers. Once the stopper is removed, the same stopper cannot be put back again. The housemates will have to stop the water from leaking by putting their fingers inside the holes. So at any given time, 4 housemates will have guard the tank and cover the holes with fingers. The tank has various levels starting from 20 till 100. As the water leaks, the weekly budget will reduce. In the end, the weekly budget will be decided on the basis on the water left in the tanker till what level.; Kam Se Kam Isko Toh Bachao: Bigg Boss calls Diana in the confession room and assigns the task Kam Se Kam Isko Toh Bachao.
Week 5	Punishments	Bigg Boss declare open nominations: Bigg Boss also informs the housemates that since few members broke rules last time, the repercussion of this will be seen today. To everyone's surprise, Bigg Boss declare open nominations, wherein each housemate will have to declare their votes in front of the entire housemates.; During a heated verbal exchange between Sambhavna and Raja a day prior to nomination day, Bigg Boss found Raja guilty of breaking important house rules on the account of use of foul language. As a warning to all housemates and as a penalty for Raja, Bigg Boss himself nominated Raja for eviction and banned him from using his nomination right for week five.
Week 5	Reward	—N/a
Week 5	Twists	Sana, Elina Wadiwala's twin sister, was sent into the house as a guest by briefly swapping her with Alina. Both sisters are identical twins.
Week 5	Exits	Day 33: Alina Wadiwala was evicted from the house after facing the public vote.
Week 6	Nominations	Day 36: Nominations were announced and again had to pick two housemates to evict. As a result; Rahul and Raja were nominated for the sixth week's eviction. Rahul was already nominated after breaking the rules.
Week 6	Tasks	Sing 'n' Dance: Bigg Boss sent in the Sing n Dance task where each housemate has to dance on a song assigned to him/her along with a partner and a prop. The song assigned to the members is as follows: Housemate / Song Danced On / Prop; Ashutosh / Bhole Bhali Ladki / Broom; Debojit / Pehli Nazar Mein / Guitar; Diana / Yeh Ladka Hai Allah / Pom Pom; Ehsaan / Hai Huku Hai Huku / Umbrella; Payal / Jab Pyaar Kiya Toh Darna Kya / Magic Wand; Rahul / Piya Tu Ab Toh Aaja / Brush; Raja / Aa Dehken Zara / Matki; Sambhavna / Chamma Chamma / Hoola Hoop; Zulfi / Pappu Can't Dance Saala / Skate Board; Bonfire: On the evening of day 40 housemates were asked to arrange for a bonfire party in the garden area around a camp-fire and dance to the tunes played by Bigg Boss.
Week 6	Other Tasks	To play pool volleyball in a game of three sets.; To arrange for a dancing competition by creating three teams, one each under the three female housemates.
Week 6	Punishments	The night before the nomination day, Rahul disconnected the loudspeakers from men's bedroom. Raja raised the protest to Bigg Boss citing Rahul's act as a violation of an important house-rule and demanded similar penalty as he was given the week before for a house-rule violation. Bigg Boss found Rahul guilty. Bigg Boss himself nominated Rahul and he was also banned from voting for week six.; Sambhavna and Diana did not participate in the given task of pool Volleyball. Zulfi and Ehsaan decided to overrule Bigg Boss for their assigned roles in the task. Bigg Boss penalised them by sending in a dummy, called Mr. Rathod, and asking these four of entertain the dummy by dancing before him for one whole day. The four took turns for dancing.; Rahul was penalised for complaining of pain in the legs and so not participating in the weekly tasks. Bigg Boss sent in a wheelchair for Rahul and asked him to use it.
Week 6	Reward	—N/a
Week 6	Twists	Fake eviction: Although Rahul and Raja were nominated to face the public vote for eviction, in reality the voting lines remained close for the sixth week. Bigg Boss decided to change the formate of the show by introducing "fake eviction" where Bigg Boss would select one of the two nominated people to be evicted and reintroduced into the house. The person would undergo the normal eviction process, but after meeting with show anchor Shilpa outside, the member would be re-entered into the house immediately. For the first two days, however, the person would be kept in isolation in a secret room from where the person would be able to watch other house-mates without them knowing. The member would then be reintroduced into the main house with the rest of house-mates once the nomination process for week seven is over. On the day of eviction, Bigg Boss selected Raja to undergo fake eviction. All housemates, including Raja, remained unaware of this change of format. Raja was told of his re-entry only after he was first evicted from the house by Bigg Boss.; On day 40 Abhishek Bachchan was sent into the Bigg Boss house as a guest. The (fake) eviction process for the week was carried out through him.
Week 6	Exits	Day 40: Raja Chaudhary was announced evicted after facing the public votes. But later he entered the secret room for few days and was announced as a fake eviction hence there was no eviction in the sixth week.
Week 7	Nominations	Day 43: Nominations were announced and again had to pick two housemates to evict. As a result; Ashutosh, Debojit and Sambhavna were nominated for the seventh week's eviction.
Week 7	Tasks	Releasing Balloons with Messages: Bigg Boss asked all housemates to blow in total 3000 balloons using Helium gas and release them in batches of 500 balloons at a time along with messages. The helium gas tank and other material was provided.; Statue of Bigg Boss: Bigg Boss urged the housemates to use their imagination and create a statue of Bigg Boss as they see him from inside the house.; Eid celebrations: Bigg Boss arranged for cooking for a special feast for the housemates on the occasion of Eid ul-Fitr on Oct 2. Housemates prepared special meals in the garden area. All housemates, especially Zulfi and Ahsaan, sent Eid greetings to their respective families through Bigg Boss.
Week 7	Punishments	—N/a
Week 7	Reward	—N/a
Week 7	Twists	Raja makes a re-entry: After spending three nights and two days in the secret room, Raja was reintroduced into the Bigg Boss house on Monday morning after the nominations for week seven were over. All housemates, including Raja, remain unaware that Raja's eviction the previous Friday was a "fake eviction", and considers his re-entry as a wild-card entry which normally is given to an evicted member.; On day 47 the eviction process was managed by Bigg Boss himself. The show hostess Shilpa Shetty normally anchors the eviction process from the studio along with invited guests of the show. On day 47, however, Shilpa remained absent, and the show was not anchored from the studio.
Week 7	Exits	Day 47: Sambhavna Seth was evicted from the house after facing the public vote.
Week 8	Entrances	Day 49: Monica Bedi re-entered the house as a wild card entrant.
Week 8	Nominations	Day 50: Nominations were announced and again had to pick two housemates to evict. As a result; Payal, Rahul and Raja were nominated for the eighth week's eviction.
Week 8	Tasks	Modern Family Drama - Shaq Ki Sui: Bigg Boss gives the housemates this week's weekly task as they will have to perform a "Modern Family Drama" for an audience in the age group of 12–50 years. The housemates named their drama Shaq Ki Sui meaning "A needle of doubt". The task demands that every housemate should have a prominent role and that the drama should demonstrate different kind of emotions. Also, there should be 2 songs in the drama.; Ehsaan's secret tasks: Earlier in the week Bigg Boss called Ahsaan in the confession room and set him two tasks that he must perform in secrecy without the knowledge of other housemates. Bigg Boss gave Ahsaan a digital still camera and expected him to capture a front-profile of each and every housemate present in the house during that week. Ahsaan was to return the camera back to Bigg Boss by Wednesday night or earlier after the task was done. As a second secret task, Bigg Boss asked Ahsaan to keep a watch on adherence of the rule book within the house and draw Bigg Boss's attention towards any event that might have indicated breaking of important house-rules by other housemates (such as discussion of nomination strategy). Ahsaan was to alert Bigg Boss by tugging at his own collars. When asked, Bigg Boss informed him that both the tasks were mandatory, and if successful Ahsaan would be rewarded for it, else punished. Bigg Boss also expected Ahsaan to give articulated report of the daily happenings to him in the confession room. Later Ahsaan submitted the camera back to Bigg Boss claiming the task was done successfully.; Dandiya: On the occasion of Dasara, Bigg Boss gives the housemates opportunity to play dandiya.
Week 8	Punishments	—N/a
Week 8	Reward	—N/a
Week 8	Twists	—N/a
Week 8	Exits	Day 54: Payal Rohatgi was evicted from the house after facing the public vote.
Week 9	Nominations	Day 57: Nominations were announced and again had to pick two housemates to evict. As a result; Ashutosh, Debojit and Ehsaan were nominated for the ninth week's eviction.
Week 9	Tasks	Making of Diwali Diya's: Bigg Boss assigned the housemates the task of making 2000 Diyas (clay lamp).
Week 9	Punishments	Diana was punished by Bigg Boss for not being careful of wearing the microphone all the time despite reminders and warnings. Bigg Boss called her in the confession room and gave her the punishment of not speaking with any of the housemates until Bigg Boss advices otherwise. She was allowed to use sign language instead.; Ashutosh was punished by Bigg Boss for oversleeping in the morning, and also for falling asleep during the day. The punishment for Ashutosh was to sleep for the whole day while other housemates go about assigned tasks, and to do so until Bigg Boss is convinced that Ashutosh is contented with sleeping.
Week 9	Reward	—N/a
Week 9	Twists	—N/a
Week 9	Exits	On Day 61, Ehsaan Qureshi was evicted from the house after facing the public vote.
Week 10	Nominations	On Day 64, Nominations were announced and again had to pick two housemates to evict. As a result; Ashutosh, Monica, Diana, Raja, Rahul and Zulfi were nominated for the tenth week's eviction.
Week 10	Tasks	Dolay: Acting on screenplay of Movie Sholay: Bigg Boss assigned the housemates the task of choosing one of the seven characters of the Bollywood movie Sholay and to act on its screenplay.
Week 10	Punishments	As a disciplinary punishment for all the housemates, Bigg Boss withdraws the normal nomination voting process by the housemates; instead Bigg Boss nominates the entire house - all remaining seven members - up for eviction for week 10.
Week 10	Reward	—N/a
Week 10	Twists	—N/a
Week 10	Exits	Day 68: Debojit Saha was evicted from the house after facing the public vote.
Week 11	Nominations	Day 71: Nominations were announced and again had to pick two housemates to evict. But, later Bigg Boss announced that as it was Diwali week, no one is getting nominated and evicted.
Week 11	Tasks	Light the Diya's: Bigg Boss assigned the housemates the task of lighting 1500 diyas on the occasion of Diwali - the festival of light. The housemates were given oil and cotton to complete the task. The diyas should be kept alight for the whole night of Day 71. For keeping this vigil Bigg Boss asked the housemates to build a magic float with the help of the given items and procedure. By wearing the assigned (sailor) uniform one housemate was to sit on this magic float in the swimming pool and keep watch on the diyas. The housemate on the watch was also given a brass bell such that the person could notify others when needed.
Week 11	Punishments	—N/a
Week 11	Reward	—N/a
Week 11	Twists	No Eviction on Diwali: As a gift on the occasion of Diwali festival Bigg Boss announced to the public for week 11 that no housemate would be evicted from the Bigg Boss house at the end of week 11. This was in spite of nomination voting process conducted as usual by housemates at the start of the week. The housemates remained unaware of this decision and twist by Bigg Boss. The voting lines remained closed for week 11.; Ashutosh spends the night in the secret room: On day 72 Monday morning Bigg Boss called Ashutosh in the confession room and inquired about the general mood in the house. Bigg Boss also gave Ashutosh his luggage bag and asked him to take it with him while he leaves the confession room. Later in the evening, Bigg Boss announced that he is going to award one of the housemates the title of the most true person. Bigg Boss asked all housemates to get ready and assemble in the living area. The award goes to Ashutosh and was asked to give a speech from the performance area. As a special gift Ashutosh was given 15 minutes to pack his bags and get inside the confession room. After reaching confession room, Ashutosh was moved into the secret room of the house by Bigg Boss where he spent one night watching movies. The other housemates remained unaware of this twist and kept speculating about Ashutosh's eviction.
Week 11	Exits	Day 75: Shilpa announced there was no eviction.
Week 12	Nominations	Day 78: Nominations were announced and again had to pick two housemates to evict. As a result; Ashutosh and Diana were nominated for the ninth week's eviction.
Week 12	Tasks	Each housemate has to take care of a baby doll.; Bigg Boss gives a task to the housemates -The Airtel Delhi Half Marathon. In this task all the housemates have to run 21 km on the treadmill wearing the Airtel T- Shirt and the task has to continue without stopping.
Week 12	Punishments	—N/a
Week 12	Reward	—N/a
Week 12	Twists	Payal and Sambhavna return to Bigg Boss: A new twist in the house of Bigg Boss season 2, Payal and Sambhavna are back in the house as guest but nobody in the house knows about their guest presence. They are thinking that they are back in the game.
Week 12	Exits	Day 82: Diana Hayden was evicted from the house after facing the public vote.
Week 13	Nominations	Day 85: Nominations were announced and again had to pick two housemates to evict. As a result; Monica and Zulfi were nominated for the ninth week's eviction.
Week 13	Tasks	
Week 13	Punishments	—N/a
Week 13	Reward	—N/a
Week 13	Twists	Bigg Boss informs Raja that a special guest is going to enter the house and the housemates will have to take care of the visitor. They will have to do special arrangements to welcome the guest. Bigg Boss also gives them a ‘thali of flowers’ and red carpet is laid down to welcome the guest. All of them get ready to greet the guest and are very excited to see the new guest. All the housemates get surprised after seeing a Dog named Kut unexpected visitor and welcome him by showering flowers on him.
Week 13	Exits	Day 89: Monica Bedi was evicted from the house after facing the public vote.; Day 90: Ashutosh Kaushik, Raja Chaudhary, Rahul Mahajan and Zulfi Syed walked out of the house.
Week 14	Nominations	Day 92: Nominations were announced and again had to pick one housemate to evict. As a result; Raja and Zulfi were nominated for the final week's eviction. Later Bigg Boss announced the nominations were cancelled after Rahul's ejection but later all were nominated for the finale results.
Week 14	Tasks	Pathshala: Bigg Boss directed to create a Pathshala (school). Raja and Zulfi were to role-play of school children and Ashutosh was to play the role of teacher.
Week 14	Happenings	Day 92: The last nominations took place where only Raja and Zulfi were nominated but later got cancelled due to Rahul's ejection.; Day 93: Rahul was ejected from the show.; Day 94: Task Pathshala started.; Day 95: All housemates were nominated for the finale.; Day 96: Ravi Kishan came for a special task.
Week 14	Twists	All four housemates who left the show came back to the house and while Raja, Ashutosh and Zulfi apologised. Rahul on the other hand refused to say sorry and was thrown out.; Rahul Mahajan has won the Sabse Bada Dilwala title and Chevrolet Aveo U-Va car as prize.
Week 14	Exits	Day 93: Rahul Mahajan was asked to leave the house after he refused to apologise for breach of discipline.
Week 14	Finalists	
Week 14	2nd runner-up	Zulfi Syed
Week 14	1st runner-up	Raja Chaudhary
Week 14	Winner	Ashutosh Kaushik

== Nominations table ==
	Week 1	Week 2	Week 3	Week 4	Week 5	Week 6	Week 7	Week 8	Week 9	Week 10	Week 11	Week 12	Week 13	Week 14		
	Week 1	Week 2	Week 3	Week 4	Week 5	Week 6	Week 7	Week 8	Week 9	Week 10	Week 11	Week 12	Week 13	Day 92	Day 97	
Vote to:	Evict									None	Evict				WIN	
Ashutosh	Ehsaan; Raja	Rahul; Rakhi	Banned	Alina; Debojit	^{1} Debojit; Rahul	Sambhavna; Debojit	Debojit; Sambhavna	Payal; Rahul	Zulfi; Debojit	No; Nominations	Monica; Rahul	Rahul; Monica	Zulfi; Monica	Zulfi	No; Nominations	Winner (Day 97)
Ashutosh	Ehsaan; Raja	Rahul; Rakhi	Banned	Alina; Debojit	^{1} Debojit; Rahul	Sambhavna; Debojit	Debojit; Sambhavna	Payal; Rahul	Zulfi; Debojit	No; Nominations	Secret Room (Days 72–73)	Rahul; Monica	Walked (Day 90)	Zulfi	No; Nominations	Winner (Day 97)
Raja	Debojit; Sanjay	Rahul; Rakhi	Monica; Rahul	Ketki	Banned & Nominated	Ehsaan; Sambhavna	Exempt	Rahul; Payal	Debojit; Zulfi	No; Nominations	Monica; Rahul	Diana; Zulfi	Monica; Zulfi	Zulfi	No; Nominations	1st runner-up (Day 97)
Raja	Debojit; Sanjay	Rahul; Rakhi	Monica; Rahul	Ketki	Banned & Nominated	Secret Room (Days 40–43)		Rahul; Payal	Debojit; Zulfi	No; Nominations	Monica; Rahul	Diana; Zulfi	Walked (Day 90)	Zulfi	No; Nominations	1st runner-up (Day 97)
Zulfi	Ashutosh; Rakhi	Rakhi; Rahul	Monica; Rahul	Ashutosh; Ketki	^{2} Sambhavna; Alina	Sambhavna; Raja	Rahul; Sambhavna	Ashutosh; Raja	Raja; Ashutosh	No; Nominations	Raja; Ashutosh	Diana; Ashutosh	Rahul; Monica	Raja	No; Nominations	2nd runner-up (Day 97)
Zulfi	Ashutosh; Rakhi	Rakhi; Rahul	Monica; Rahul	Ashutosh; Ketki	^{2} Sambhavna; Alina	Sambhavna; Raja	Rahul; Sambhavna	Ashutosh; Raja	Raja; Ashutosh	No; Nominations	Raja; Ashutosh	Diana; Ashutosh	Walked (Day 90)	Raja	No; Nominations	2nd runner-up (Day 97)
Rahul	Raja; Ashutosh	Ehsaan; Sambhavna	Zulfi; Raja	Ehsaan; Ketki	^{7} Sambhavna; Ashutosh	Banned & Nominated	Diana; Ashutosh	Raja; Diana	Debojit; Ehsaan	No; Nominations	Zulfi; Raja	Diana; Ashutosh	Raja; Zulfi	Raja	Ejected (Day 93)	
Rahul	Raja; Ashutosh	Ehsaan; Sambhavna	Zulfi; Raja	Ehsaan; Ketki	^{7} Sambhavna; Ashutosh	Banned & Nominated	Diana; Ashutosh	Raja; Diana	Debojit; Ehsaan	No; Nominations	Zulfi; Raja	Diana; Ashutosh	Walked (Day 90)	Raja	Ejected (Day 93)	
Monica	Raja; Zulfi	Sambhavna; Ehsaan	Zulfi; Sambhavna	Evicted (Day 19)				Exempt	Ashutosh; Ehsaan	No; Nominations	Ashutosh; Raja	Diana; Ashutosh	Zulfi; Raja	Evicted (Day 89)		
Diana	Not In House				Exempt	Ehsaan; Raja	Rahul; Ehsaan	Rahul; Payal	Monica; Rahul	No; Nominations	Monica; Rahul	Rahul; Monica	Evicted (Day 82)			
Debojit	Raja; Ashutosh	Payal; Ashutosh	Ketki; Sambhavna	Sambhavna; Alina	^{5} Alina; Ashutosh	Ashutosh; Raja	Ashutosh; Zulfi	Ashutosh; Ehsaan	Ehsaan; Ashutosh	No; Nominations	Evicted (Day 68)					
Ehsaan	Raja; Zulfi	Rakhi; Rahul	Monica; Rahul	Alina; Payal	^{4} Payal; Alina	Raja; Ashutosh	Ashutosh; Debojit	Rahul; Payal	Diana; Ashutosh	Evicted (Day 61)						
Payal	Raja; Sambhavna	Rakhi; Sambhavna	Sambhavna; Monica	Sambhavna; Ketki	^{6} Alina; Sambhavna	Sambhavna; Raja	Ashutosh; Sambhavna	Raja; Ehsaan	Evicted (Day 54)			Guest (Days 78–84)				
Sambhavna	Sanjay; Rakhi	Rakhi; Rahul	Banned	Zulfi; Payal	^{3} Ashutosh; Alina	Ashutosh; Raja	Debojit; Ashutosh	Evicted (Day 47)				Guest (Days 78–84)				
Alina	Sanjay; Raja	Ehsaan; Payal	Banned	Zulfi; Payal	^{8} Zulfi; Payal	Evicted (Day 33)										
Ketki	Raja; Sanjay	Raja; Rakhi	Monica; Rahul	Zulfi; Ashutosh	Evicted (Day 26)											
Rakhi	Raja; Ketki	Sambhavna; Ehsaan	Evicted (Day 12)													
Sanjay	Debojit; Raja	Evicted (Day 6)														
Jade	Raja; Sanjay	Walked (Day 2)														
Notes	1, 2	3	4	5	6, 7, 8	9	10	11	None	12	13	14	15	16	17	
Against Public Vote	Raja; Sanjay	Rahul; Rakhi	Monica; Rahul	Alina; Ketki; Payal; Zulfi	Alina; Raja	Rahul; Raja	Ashutosh; Debojit; Sambhavna	Payal; Rahul; Raja	Ashutosh; Debojit; Ehsaan	Ashutosh; Debojit; Diana; Monica; Rahul; Raja; Zulfi	None	Ashutosh; Diana	Monica; Zulfi	~~Raja~~; ~~Zulfi~~	Ashutosh; Raja; Zulfi	
Guest	None											Payal	None			
Guest	None											Sambhavna	None			
Secret Room	None					Raja		None			Ashutosh	None				
Re-Entered	None							Monica	None			Payal	Ashutosh	None		
Re-Entered	None							Monica	None			Payal	Rahul	None		
Re-Entered	None							Monica	None			Sambhavna	Raja	None		
Re-Entered	None							Monica	None			Sambhavna	Zulfi	None		
Walked	Jade	None											Ashutosh	None		
Walked	Jade	None											Rahul	None		
Walked	Jade	None											Raja	None		
Walked	Jade	None											Zulfi	None		
Ejected	None													Rahul	None	
Evicted	Sanjay	Rakhi	Monica	Ketki	Alina	No; Eviction	Sambhavna	Payal	Ehsaan	Debojit	No; Eviction	Diana	Monica	No; Eviction	Zulfi	
Evicted	Sanjay	Rakhi	Monica	Ketki	Alina	No; Eviction	Sambhavna	Payal	Ehsaan	Debojit	No; Eviction	Diana	Monica	No; Eviction	Raja	Ashutosh

Color Key

indicates the House Captain.
indicates that the Housemate was directly nominated for eviction prior to the regular nominations process.
indicates that the housemate has Re-Entered.
indicates that the person was saved by another housemate.
indicates that the housemate has been granted immunity from nominations.
indicates that the housemate was in the caravan or secret room.
indicates that the housemate entered as a wild card entrant.
indicates that the housemate has been declared as the winner.
indicates that the housemate has been declared as the first runner-up.
indicates that the housemate has been declared as the second runner-up.
indicates the contestant has been evicted.
indicates the contestant has been walked out of the show.
indicates the housemate was ejected.

=== Nomination notes ===
- ^1Jade left the House due to medical reasons.
- ^2Ashutosh, Alina and Sambhavna were not allowed to nominate this week as punishment from Bigg Boss for breaking house rules.
- ^3Through a successful weekly task Bigg Boss gave Raja a special privilege to name one person who would be nominated for eviction for week four irrespective of nomination vote-count. Raja named Ketki (indicated above by 'N'). Ketki also received three nominations from other housemates by the normal voting process. Raja remained immune from nomination for week four.
- ^4During a heated verbal exchange between Sambhavna and Raja a day prior to nomination day, Bigg Boss found Raja guilty of breaking important house rules on the account of use of foul language. As a warning to all housemates and as a penalty for Raja, Bigg Boss himself nominated Raja for eviction and banned him from using his nomination right for week five.
  On other accounts of breaking house-rules such as falling asleep during afternoons, Bigg Boss conducted the nomination voting process for week five in open group as against to the usual process that takes place individually within the secrecy of the confession room. The numbers in the individual's box above show the order in which Bigg Boss asked the members to declare their two nominations along with their reasons in front of all other housemates.
  Diana Hayden entered the house Monday after the nomination process for week 5 was over and so she remained exempt for week 5.
- ^5The night before the nomination day, Rahul disconnected the loudspeakers from men's bedroom. Raja raised the protest to Bigg Boss citing Rahul's act as a violation of an important house-rule and demanded a similar penalty as he was given the week before for a house-rule violation. Bigg Boss found Rahul guilty. Bigg Boss himself nominated Rahul and he was also banned from voting for week six.
- ^6Following his 'fake' eviction Raja Choudhary spent the weekend in the secret room of the Bigg Boss house and thus remained away and exempt from the nominations for week 7.
- ^7Monica Bedi got a wild-card entry to re-enter the Bigg Boss house after being voted in by the people. Monica entered the house after the nomination process for week 8 was over. She thus remained exempt from the nominations.
- ^8Bigg Boss gathers the entire house in the living area and observes that despite numerous earlier warnings to individuals for breaking important house-rules such as planning for nominations, the housemates continued disobeying the rules through the ninth week running. Bigg Boss finds each and every member of the house guilty of this disobedience, namely, discussing, revealing or planning for nominations. For week 10, Bigg Boss withdraws the normal nomination voting process by the housemates; instead Bigg Boss nominates the entire house - all seven members - up for eviction for week 10.
- ^9For week 11 Bigg Boss announced to the public that on the occasion of Diwali that falls during the said week no housemate would be evicted from the Bigg Boss house at the end of week 11. This was in spite of the nomination voting process conducted as usual by housemates at the start of the week. The housemates remained unaware of this decision and twist by Bigg Boss. The voting lines remained closed for the public for week 11.
- ^10Starting the nominations voting process, Bigg Boss announced that as per his knowledge the housemates like discussing, deciding and divulging nominations a lot, which is also breaking of an important house rule. Thus, Bigg Boss called for open nominations for week 12. The numbers in the individual's box above show the order in which Bigg Boss asked the housemates to declare in front of all other housemates their two nominations along with their reasons.
- ^11On Saturday, day 91, all housemates protested stating that they did not have adequate food items available to them in the house for cooking, and all the four left the Bigg Boss house by jumping over the compound wall. Later, all were reintroduced into the house by Bigg Boss after a discussion with the show producers. Citing this event as a breach of an important house-rule Bigg Boss announced to conduct the nomination process for the final week. Each housemate was called into the confession room to name one person for eviction along with reasons. Rahul and Zulfi nominated Raja during their individual turns. Raja and Ashutosh individually named Zulfi the same way. Raja and Zulfi were declared as nominated for eviction by Bigg Boss for the final week. After Rahul walked out of the Bigg Boss house on day 93, the nominations were cancelled on day 94. All remaining housemates remained up for eviction and face the public vote for the final on day 98.
- ^11On Saturday, day 98, Ashutosh Kaushik was announced as the winner of Big Boss 2.
