= Tannaz Irani =

Indian actress

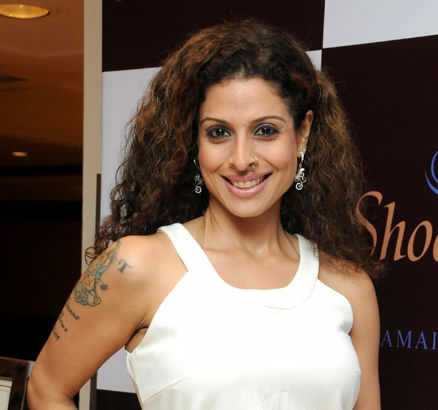
- Irani in April 2013
- Born: 8 April 1972 (age 54); Mumbai, Maharashtra, India
- Occupation: Actress
- Years active: 1993–present
- Spouses: Farid Currim (divorced); Bakhtiyar Irani (m. 2007)
- Children: 3
- Relatives: Delnaaz Irani (sister-in-law)
- Website: tannazirani.com

Tannaz Irani (née Lal born 8 April 1972) is an Indian actress. She has acted in Bollywood films and Hindi television serials. She has also been credited as Tannaz Lal, her maiden name, and Tanaaz Currim (during her first marriage).

== Career ==
Tannaz began her TV career in Zabaan Sambhalke. Her film career started in 2000, with her debut as Neeta in Kaho Naa... Pyaar Hai, directed by Rakesh Roshan. That film was also the debut film of the lead actors Hrithik Roshan and Ameesha Patel. She played Patel's cousin and Roshan's friend. Her significant credits include Abbas Mustan's thriller 36 China Town, Sooraj Barjatya's Main Prem Ki Diwani Hoon, and Jugal Hansraj's Roadside Romeo. She has also acted in several television serials including Ye Meri Life Hai, Kis Desh Mein Hai Meraa Dil, and played the role of Lisa D'Souza on the sitcom Badi Door Se Aaye Hain. In 2019, played Nishi Sippy in Kahaan Hum Kahaan Tum.

Besides acting, Tannaz was also the Runner-up of Mrs. India 2002. She and her husband, Bakhtiyar Irani, came in third in the celebrity dance show Nach Baliye in 2006. They have also done a music album that was choreographed by Bosco-Caesar. In 2009, she featured as a housemate on the reality show Bigg Boss 3; and participated in Maa Exchange in 2011, with Vindu Dara Singh's wife Dina.

== Personal life ==
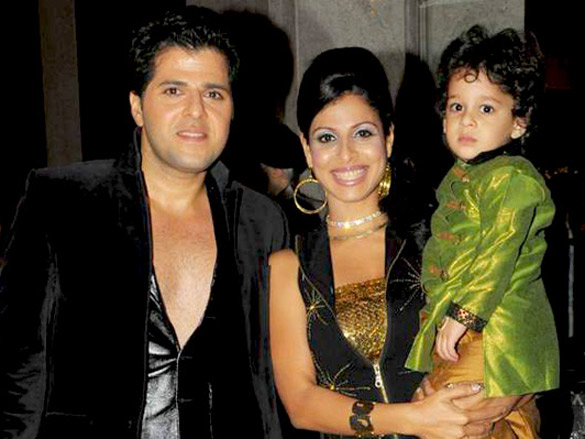
Tanaaz (middle) with son Zeus (right) and husband Bakhtiyaar Irani

An Irani Zoroastrian by birth, Tannaz was very young when she married Farid Currim. She was 20 when she gave birth to her first daughter Zianne, who stays with her ex-husband Farid. After her divorce, she started acting in serials. In 2006, she met actor Bakhtiyar Irani, on the set of Fame Gurukul. The duo fell in love and wanted to get married, but their relationship was not approved by Bakhtiyar's family because Tannaz is seven years older than Bakhtiyar. However, Delnaaz and his elder brother, Paurus Irani, helped to convince their parents, and the couple got married in 2007. On 20 March 2008, the couple's first child, a boy, was born. They named him Zeus after the Greek God. On 19 September 2011, Tannaz gave birth to a second girl, Zara Irani.

== Filmography ==
=== Films ===
Year	Title	Role	Other notes
1999	Double Gadbad	Maria Pereira	
2000	Kaho Naa... Pyaar Hai	Neeta	
2000	Hamara Dil Aapke Paas Hai	Preeti's friend	
2000	Hadh Kar Di Aapne	Pares	
2001	Rehnaa Hai Terre Dil Mein	Shruti	
2002	Mere Yaar Ki Shaadi Hai	Anu	
2002	Deewangee	Yana	
2003	Main Prem Ki Diwani Hoon	Roopa	
2003	Kuch Naa Kaho	Ms. Lobo	
2004	Daag – Shades of Love		
2004	Manini	Maya	Marathi film
2006	36 China Town	Ruby	
2008	Roadside Romeo	Mini	voice role
2008	Maan Gaye Mughal-e-Azam	Champa	
2010	Golmaal 3		Cameo in "Aale" Song

=== Television ===
Show Name	Role
V3	Villie
V3 Plus	Tanha
Zaban Sambhal Ke	Jennifer "Jenny" Jones
Kahani Ghar Ghar Ki	Mita
Gopaljee	Julie
Hum Aapke Hain Woh	Yojna
Do Aur Do Paanch	Rashmi
Gudgudee	Various characters
Swabhimaan	Babli
Ye Meri Life Hai	Jayashree
Shree	Mungna Behn
Nach Baliye	Contestant (2nd runner up)
Hans Baliye	Contestant (Semi finalist)
Bigg Boss 3	Contestant (Evicted on Day 42)
Meri Biwi Wonderful	Angela
Shubh Mangal Savadhan	Khushi
Miley Jab Hum Tum	Tanya
Ssshhhh...Koi Hai	Shape Shifting Spirit
Aahat – Maut Ka Khel	
Maa Exchange	Herself
Ikka Begum Baadshah	
Welcome – Baazi Mehmaan-Nawazi Ki	Herself
Badi Door Se Aaye Hai	Lisa
Jamai Raja	Resham
Kahaan Hum Kahaan Tum	Nishi Sippy
Apna Time Bhi Aayega	Rajeshwari Singh Rajawat aka Ranisa
Jijaji Chhat Parr Koii Hai	Mayuri
Barsatein – Mausam Pyaar Ka	Beena
Ghum Hai Kisikey Pyaar Meiin	Roopa

== Web series ==
Year	Title	Role	Language	Note
2021	Benaqaab	Shenaaz Shroff	Gujarati	Debut

== See also ==
- List of Indian film actresses
