= Aryeman =

Indian actor

- Born: Aryeman Ramsay; Delhi, India
- Occupations: Film director, actor, social activist

Aryeman Ramsay, known simply as Aryeman, is an Indian actor who appears in Bollywood films. He is the son of producer Keshu.

Starting off his career by socializing in game advertisements, Ramsay made his Bollywood debut in Family: Ties of Blood (2006) and was nominated a Filmfare Best Male Debut Award for his performance. His other films include Good Luck! (2008) and Ek Aadat (2010).

== Early life ==
His big break came when his father offered him a role in his action drama film, Family - Ties of Blood (2006), in which he co-starred with Akshay Kumar and Amitabh Bachchan, although the film failed, he still got nominated for a Filmfare Best Male Debut Award.

== Film career ==
Aryeman basically started his acting career as a child-artist in 1991 in the romance film Saugandh, which starred Akshay Kumar. He then debuted as an adult in his home-production, Family - Ties of Blood, co-starring Amitabh Bachchan, Akshay Kumar again and Bhumika Chawla.

He then starred in the 2008 comedy film Good Luck!, along with Sayali Bhagat, Lucky Ali and Ranvir Shorey. Good Luck! was an official remake of the 2006 Hollywood film Just My Luck. In 2009, he also appeared in Tom, Dick, and Harry Rock Again! which is a sequel to the 2006 comedy flick Tom, Dick, and Harry!

In 2010, he starred in the romantic comedy film Ek Aadat. He released Ranbanka in November 2015.

== Filmography ==
Year	Title	Role	Other notes
1991	Saugandh		Uncredited
2006	Family: Ties of Blood	Aryan Bhatia	Nominated, Filmfare Best Male Debut Award
2008	Good Luck	Vicky Varma	
2009	Tom, Dick, and Harry, Rock Again!		
2010	Ek Aadat	Shiva	
2011	Main Osama	Karan Choudhary	
2012	It's Rocking Dard-E-Disco	Rambo	
2014	Riyasat	Vijay	
