= Bigg Boss (Hindi TV series) season 1 =

Bigg Boss
- Season 1
- Title card of season 1
- Presented by: Arshad Warsi
- No. of days: 86
- No. of housemates: 15
- Winner: Rahul Roy
- Runner-up: Carol Gracias
- No. of episodes: 86

Release
- Original network: SET
- Original release: 3 November 2006 – 26 January 2007

Season chronology
- Next → Season 2

Bigg Boss, also known as Bigg Boss: Kahin Uski Nazar Aap Pe To Nahi or Bigg Boss: Kadi Nazar, Solid Assarr, is the first season of the Indian reality TV programme Bigg Boss. It aired on Sony Entertainment Television from 3 November 2006 to 26 January 2007, a total of 86 days. Unlike other versions of Big Brother, the Indian version uses celebrities, not members of the general public, as housemates. The first season was hosted by Bollywood actor Arshad Warsi. The 86-episode series ended on 26 January 2007 with Rahul Roy becoming the winner while Carol Gracias became the runner-up.

== Production ==
The show is based on the Big Brother format developed by John de Mol. A number of contestants (known as "housemates") lived in a purpose-built house and were isolated from the rest of the world. Each week, housemates nominated two of their peers for eviction, and the housemates who received the most nominations would face a public vote. Of these, one would eventually leave, having been "evicted" from the House. However, there were exceptions to this process as dictated by Bigg Boss. In the final week, there were three housemates remaining, and the public voted for who they wanted to win.

Tasks were set by Bigg Boss each week. The housemates were allowed to gamble on task outcomes and were rewarded with extra money to order more supplies if they won.

== Housemates status ==
Sr	Housemate	Day entered	Day exited	Status
1	Rahul	Day 1	Day 86	Winner
2	Carol	Day 1	Day 86	1st runner-up
3	Ravi	Day 1	Day 86	2nd runner-up
4	Rakhi	Day 1	Day 29	Evicted
4	Rakhi	Day 42	Day 84	Evicted
5	Amit	Day 1	Day 77	Evicted
6	Rupali	Day 1	Day 70	Evicted
7	Baba	Day 45	Day 63	Evicted
8	Ragini	Day 1	Day 56	Evicted
9	Deepak T	Day 13	Day 49	Evicted
10	Anupama	Day 1	Day 42	Evicted
11	Aryan	Day 1	Day 35	Evicted
12	Kashmera	Day 1	Day 21	Evicted
12	Kashmera	Day 71	Day 81	Guest
13	Deepak P	Day 1	Day 14	Evicted
14	Bobby	Day 1	Day 7	Evicted
15	Salil	Day 1	Day 6	Ejected

== Housemates ==
The participants in the order of appearance and entered in house are:

=== Original entrants ===
- Salil Ankola – Cricketer and also an actor. A right-arm fast bowler, he played first-class cricket for Maharashtra, regularly opening the bowling. Ankola's consistent performances for Maharashtra earned him a call for representing India during their tour of Pakistan in 1989–90. After the first Test match at Karachi, he was dropped for the subsequent matches in the series owing to injuries (TEST). After a brief phase of playing first-class cricket, Ankola was called for the Indian ODI team during 1993, eventually led to being a part of the 1996 Cricket World Cup. He has acted in films like Pitaah and Chura Liyaa Hai Tumne.
- Kashmera Shah – Film actress. She is known for acting in films like Dulhan Hum Le Jayenge, Kahin Pyaar Na Ho Jaaye and Murder.
- Rakhi Sawant – Film actress. She has appeared in many Hindi and a few Kannada, Marathi, Odia, Telugu and Tamil films. She acted in films like Chura Liyaa Hai Tumne, Main Hoon Na and Masti. She also appeared in the music video "Pardesiya", from the album D.J. Hot Remix - Vol 3.
- Rupali Ganguly – Actress. She is well known for her roles in Sarabhai vs Sarabhai, Bhabhi, Sanjivani, Kkavyanjali, Baa Bahoo Aur Baby and Kahaani Ghar Ghar Kii.
- Ravi Kishan – Bhojpuri actor and Indian politician (later). He is known for appearing in various Bollywood and Bhojpuri films. He acted in films like Tere Naam and Phir Hera Pheri.
- Amit Sadh – Actor. He participated in the dance reality show Nach Baliye with Neeru Bajwa. He has acted in shows like Kyun Hota Hai Pyarrr, Saaksshi and Kahiin To Hoga.
- Aryan Vaid – Actor and model. He participated and emerged as the winner of Mister India World. He later acted in Bollywood films like Fun – Can Be Dangerous Sometimes and Naam Gum Jayega.
- Bobby Darling – Actress. She acted in television shows like Kaahin Kissii Roz and Kasautii Zindagii Kay. She acted in films. She gained much popularity after her gender reassignment surgery.
- Deepak Parashar – Television and film actor. He acted in films like Pyar Kiya Hai Pyar Karenge and Aap To Aise Na The.
- Rahul Roy – Former actor. He is known for his role in the film Aashiqui.
- Anupama Verma – Model and actress.
- Carol Gracias – Model. She is a past winner of the India's L'Oréal/Elite Look of the Year title. She gained much publicity after a wardrobe malfunction. She has also been a part of films like Bluffmaster!.
- Ragini Shetty – Model. She has appeared in many South films.

=== Wild card entrants ===
- Deepak Tijori – Film actor. He has acted in films like Aashiqui, Jo Jeeta Wohi Sikandar, Dil Tera Aashiq, Dulhan Hum Le Jayenge.
- Baba Sehgal – Singer and rapper. He has been involved in various other area of the entertainment industry, and works in several different languages' media.

== Guest appearances ==
Week	Day	Guest(s)	Purpose of Visit	Ref(s)
1	Day 7	Shahid Kapoor	To promote his film Vivah	
1	Day 7	Johnny Lever	Special appearance	
2	Day 13	Ritesh Deshmukh	To promote his film Apna Sapna Money Money	
3	Day 22	Hrithik Roshan	To promote his film Dhoom 2	
4	Day 26	Parvin Dabas & Preeti Jhangiani	To promote their film With Luv... Tumhaara	
5	Day 30	Salman Khan & Rani Mukerji	To promote their film Baabul	
6	Day 43	John Abraham	To promote his film Kabul Express	
7	Day 50	Akshay Kumar & Lara Dutta	To promote their film Bhagam Bhag	
8	Day 58	Apurva Agnihotri, Surveen Chawla, Saumya Tandon & Kavita Kaushik	Special appearances from Sony shows	
9	Days 62-63	Anu Gaur	To support her brother Amit Sadh	
9	Days 62-63	Jaya Sawant	To support her daughter Rakhi Sawant	
9	Days 62-63	Rajni Ganguly	To support her daughter Rupali Ganguly	
9	Days 62-63	Ronnie Gracias	To support his daughter Carol Gracias	
9	Days 62-63	Rajlaxmi R. Roy	To support her husband Rahul Roy	
9	Days 62-63	Preeti Kishan	To support her husband Ravi Kishan	
10	Day 72	Abhishek Bachchan & Aishwarya Rai	To promote their film Guru	
11	Day 79	Salman Khan & Priyanka Chopra	To promote their film Salaam-E-Ishq	
12	Day 85	Saif Ali Khan & Vidya Balan	To promote their film Eklavya: The Royal Guard	

== Nominations table ==
	Week 1	Week 2	Week 3	Week 4	Week 5	Week 6	Week 7	Week 8	Week 9	Week 10	Week 11	Week 12		
	Week 1	Week 2	Week 3	Week 4	Week 5	Week 6	Week 7	Week 8	Week 9	Week 10	Week 11	Day 80	Day 85	
House Captain	Rahul	Aryan	Deepak T	Rahul	Carol	Ravi	Carol	Rahul	Rupali	Amit	Ravi	No; Captain		
Captain's Nominations	Bobby; Amit	Rupali; Carol	Kashmera; Ragini	Rupali; Rakhi	Anupama; Aryan	Rahul; Amit	Deepak T Ravi	Rupali; Amit	Rahul; Rakhi	Rupali; Ravi	^{2} Amit; Carol	No; Captain		
Vote to:	Evict											None	WIN	
Rahul	House; Captain	Deepak P Ragini	Rakhi; Kashmera	House; Captain	Aryan	Deepak T Ragini	Deepak T Rupali	House; Captain	Baba; Amit	Rupali; Rakhi	^{4} Amit; Carol	No; Nominations	No; Nominations	Winner (Day 85)
Carol	Deepak P Bobby	Deepak P Kashmera	Rakhi; Kashmera	Rakhi; Anupama	House; Captain	Anupama; Deepak T	House; Captain	Baba; Rakhi	Rakhi; Baba	Rakhi; Amit	^{3} Amit; Ravi	No; Nominations	No; Nominations	1st runner-up (Day 85)
Ravi	Deepak P Bobby	Deepak P Kashmera	Kashmera; Rakhi	Ragini; Aryan	Deepak T Aryan	House; Captain	Ragini; Deepak T	Carol; Amit	Baba; Amit	Rupali; Carol	House; Captain	No; Nominations	No; Nominations	2nd runner-up (Day 85)
Rakhi	Rahul; Deepak P	Kashmera; Rupali	Carol; Rupali	Ravi; Carol	Evicted (Day 29)		Rupali; Ragini	Rupali; Carol	Carol; Rupali	Carol; Rupali	^{5} Rahul; Ravi	No; Nominations	Evicted (Day 85)	
Amit	Deepak P Rupali	Deepak P Rupali	Aryan; Kashmera	Aryan; Rakhi	Rupali; Aryan	Ragini; Rupali	Ravi; Deepak T	Rakhi; Ragini	Rakhi; Rahul	House; Captain	^{1} Rahul; Ravi	Evicted (Day 77)		
Rupali	Aryan; Anupama	Kashmera; Deepak P	Kashmera; Ragini	Anupama; Ragini	Anupama; Deepak T	Deepak T Anupama	Deepak T Rahul	Ragini; Rahul	House; Captain	Rahul; Rakhi	Evicted (Day 70)			
Baba	Not In House							Rakhi; Ragini	Carol; Ravi	Evicted (Day 63)				
Ragini	Deepak P Bobby	Ravi; Rupali	Deepak T Ravi	Rakhi; Ravi	Carol; Anupama	Anupama; Ravi	Ravi; Rupali	Carol; Rupali	Evicted (Day 56)					
Deepak T	Not In House		House; Captain	Rakhi; Ragini	Ragini; Rupali	Rahul; Rupali	Rahul; Carol	Evicted (Day 50)						
Anupama	Rupali; Carol	Rupali; Carol	Carol; Amit	Carol; Ravi	Carol; Rupali	Rupali; Carol	Evicted (Day 42)							
Aryan	Deepak P Rahul	House; Captain	Carol; Rupali	Deepak T Carol	Carol; Rupali	Evicted (Day 35)								
Kashmera	Deepak P Rahul	Carol; Rupali	Carol; Amit	Evicted (Day 22)							Guest / Secret Room (Days 72–81)		Left (Day 81)	
Deepak P	Ravi; Ragini	Rupali; Carol	Evicted (Day 14)											
Bobby	Deepak P Ravi	Evicted (Day 7)												
Salil	Deepak P Bobby	Ejected (Day 6)												
Notes	None	1	None		2	3	None				5	None	4	
Against Public Vote	Ayaan; Bobby; Deepak P	Deepak P Ravi; Rupali	Carol; Kashmera	Carol; Ragini; Rakhi; Ravi	Aryan; Rupali	Anupama; Deepak T Ragini; Rahul; Rupali	Deepak T Ravi; Rupali	Amit; Carol; Ragini; Rakhi; Rupali	Amit; Baba; Carol; Rahul; Rakhi	Rakhi; Rupali	Amit; Carol; Rahul; Ravi	Carol; Rahul; Rakhi; Ravi	Carol; Rahul; Ravi	
Re-entered	None						Rakhi	None			Kashmera	None		
Secret Room	None										Kashmera		None	
Guest	None										Kashmera		None	
Ejected	Salil	None												
Evicted	Bobby	Deepak P	Kashmera	Rakhi	Aryan	Anupama	Deepak T	Ragini	Baba	Rupali	Amit	Rakhi	Ravi	
Evicted	Bobby	Deepak P	Kashmera	Rakhi	Aryan	Anupama	Deepak T	Ragini	Baba	Rupali	Amit	Rakhi	Carol	Rahul

indicates the House Captain.
indicates that the Housemate was directly nominated for eviction prior to the regular nominations process.
indicates that the housemate has re-entered.
indicates that the person was saved by another housemate.
indicates that the housemate has been granted immunity from nominations.
indicates that the housemate was in the caravan or secret room.
indicates that the housemate entered as a wild card entrant.
indicates that the housemate has been declared as the winner.
indicates that the housemate has been declared as the first runner-up.
indicates that the housemate has been declared as the second runner-up.
indicates the contestant has been evicted.
indicates the contestant has been walked out of the show.
indicates the housemate was ejected.

=== Nomination notes ===
- ^1: Ravi was automatically put up for eviction by Bigg Boss for swearing and for refusing to wear a microphone.
- ^2: On Day 44, Rakhi re-entered through as a wild card entrant.
- ^3: Rahul was the Sarpanch and only allowed to have 1 nomination this week.
- ^4: Bigg Boss called for an open nominations and Rakhi was exempted from the nominations for winning a task.
- ^5: On Day 85, Rahul Roy was announced as the winner.
