= Bigg Boss (Hindi TV series) =

Indian reality television show

- Based on: Big Brother
- Presented by: Arshad Warsi (S1); Shilpa Shetty (S2); Amitabh Bachchan (S3); Sanjay Dutt (S5); Farah Khan (HB); Salman Khan (S4–present)
- Voices of: Atul Kapoor
- Narrated by: Vijay Vikram Singh
- Country of origin: India
- Original language: Hindi
- No. of seasons: 19
- No. of episodes: 2076

Production
- Camera setup: Multi-camera
- Running time: 60–90 minutes
- Production company: Banijay Entertainment

Original release
- Network: Sony Entertainment Television (season 1)
- Release: 3 November 2006 – 26 January 2007
- Network: Colors TV (season 2–present)
- Release: 17 August 2008 – present

Related
- Bigg Boss OTT

Bigg Boss is an Indian Hindi-language reality television show of the Bigg Boss franchise in India that airs on Colors TV. It is based on the Dutch format of Big Brother, developed by Endemol. Since its premiere on November 3, 2006, the show has completed nineteen seasons and three OTT (Over-the-Top) seasons. Throughout its run, Bigg Boss has seen a variety of hosts. The first season was hosted by Arshad Warsi, followed by Shilpa Shetty in the second season and Amitabh Bachchan in the third. Farah Khan led the Halla Bol season, while Sanjay Dutt co-hosted the fifth season with Salman Khan. Since season 4, Salman Khan has taken the helm as the show's primary host. As of season 19, a total of 353 contestants has participated in Bigg Boss. Thirteen contestants have returned for other seasons, while two played as proxy contestants and 4 were not selected by the audience, preventing them from entering the house. As of season 19, Bigg Boss has aired a total of 2,076 episodes.

== Overview ==
=== Concept ===
Bigg Boss is a reality TV show inspired by the original Dutch Big Brother format created by John de Mol Jr. In this competition, a group of contestants, referred to as "housemates", live together in a specially designed house, cut off from the outside world. Each week, these housemates nominate each other for eviction, and those with the highest nominations face a public vote. Ultimately, one housemate is "evicted" each week.

There are some unique elements to the eviction process. Besides public voting, housemates with special privileges, like the captain, may have the power to evict someone directly. Additionally, Bigg Boss has the authority to modify the eviction process as needed, sometimes introducing exceptions or twists.

The final week of the show, with three to six housemates left. During this time, the public votes for their favorite contestant, leading to the crowning of a winner.

While most participants are celebrities in Indian version, seasons 10, 11 and 12 saw an influx of commoners as housemates, bringing a new dynamic to the show. Notably, Manveer Gurjar, a commoner, emerged as the winner of Season 10.

The housemates' actions and interactions are monitored by the voice of Bigg Boss, a mysterious figure who represents the show's authority and enforces rules.

=== House ===
The Bigg Boss house is a unique and carefully designed space that serves as the central setting for the popular reality show which is built for each season. Over the seasons, its location has varied, with the initial seasons situated in tourist-magnate hill station of Lonavala, Pune district of Maharashtra and later moving to ND Studios in Karjat, in Maharashtra's Raigad district for Season 5. From Season 13 onwards, the house has been established in Film City, Goregaon, Mumbai.

The architecture of the house is contemporary and well-furnished, featuring a range of modern amenities to facilitate the daily lives of the housemates. Key areas include: Kitchen, Living Area, Bedroom (two in first three seasons while four in sixteenth season and three in seventeenth season), Bathrooms (two toilets, two bathrooms, two washrooms in bedroom, one washroom in jail, one washroom in garden area), Storeroom, Garden and Pool Area, Lounge Room, Activity Area, Medical Room, Smoking Room, Luggage Area, Dining Area, Jail, Gym and Balcony.

One notable aspect of the Bigg Boss house is the Confession Room, an essential feature where housemates can express their thoughts, feelings, strategy or any kind of conversation as Bigg Boss listens and talks with them. This is also where the nomination process occurs sometimes.

To ensure the housemates remain disconnected from the outside world, the house is devoid of televisions, telephones, internet access, clocks, books, pens, or paper.

=== Rules ===
While not all the rules have been explicitly communicated to the audience, several key ones are clearly established. Inmates are required to speak only in Hindi. Tampering with any electronic equipment or other items in the house is strictly prohibited. They may not leave the premises at any time without permission. Physical violence is completely forbidden. Discussing the nomination process with anyone is also not allowed. Housemates must remain awake until the lights go off, and they can only converse outside of the designated smoking area. Additionally, singing is not permitted within the house, nor can they write anything while inside.

Occasionally, housemates may be nominated for various reasons, including being chosen by individuals with special privileges obtained through tasks, for breaking rules, or for other unspecified reasons. In serious cases, a contestant may face expulsion from the house.

=== Airing ===
The main television coverage of the show consists of a daily highlights program and a weekly eviction show, typically aired on Saturday/Sunday and known as Weekend Ka Vaar or for Monday known as Somvaar Ka Vaar. In Seasons 16 and 17, the weekend episodes moved to Friday/Saturday (Shukravar Ka Vaar and Shanivar Ka Vaar), all broadcast on Colors TV, while the first season aired on Sony TV.

Each daily episode features key events from the previous day, while Saturday’s episodes focus primarily on the host's analysis of the housemates' performances and special tasks. Sunday’s episodes include a fun segment with guest appearances and the eviction of the housemates nominated that week. Notably, in Seasons 16 and 17, evictions took place on Saturdays instead of Sundays.

From Season 14 onward, Bigg Boss introduced a 24/7 Live Channel for Voot Select subscribers, and later for JioCinema Premium subscribers. This allowed viewers to enjoy direct engagement with the show’s happenings. Episodes were also aired 30 minutes earlier on Voot Select and JioCinema Premium until Season 17.

In Season 16, a new segment titled Bigg Bulletin with Shekhar Suman was introduced, airing on Sundays and hosted by Shekhar Suman. Season 17 saw the introduction of another segment, Just Chill with Arbaaz & Sohail, hosted by Arbaaz Khan and Sohail Khan, also on Sundays. In Season 18, episodes included Tandav Ka Overtime, extending the usual one-hour episode with additional content to cover the day's events. Season 18 also saw the launch of segment named Haye Daiyaa with Ravi Bhaiyya Garda Udaa Denge, hosted by Season 1 finalist Ravi Kishan, again on Sundays.

On Season 19 and Season 20, episodes will be aired 90 minutes before the television broadcast on JioHotstar.

== Series details ==
Series	Host	House Location	Episodes	Originally released			Days	Housemates	Prize Money	Winner	Runner-up
Series	Host	House Location	Episodes	First released	Last released	Network	Days	Housemates	Prize Money	Winner	Runner-up
1	Arshad Warsi	Lonavala	87	3 November 2006	26 January 2007	Sony TV	86	15	₹1 crore (US$110,000)	Rahul Roy	Carol Gracias
2	Shilpa Shetty	Lonavala	99	17 August 2008	22 November 2008	Colors TV	98	15	₹1 crore (US$110,000)	Ashutosh Kaushik	Raja Chaudhary
3	Amitabh Bachchan	Lonavala	85	4 October 2009	26 December 2009	Colors TV	84	15	₹1 crore (US$110,000)	Vindu Dara Singh	Pravesh Rana
4	Salman Khan	Lonavala	98	3 October 2010	8 January 2011	Colors TV	97	16	₹1 crore (US$110,000)	Shweta Tiwari	Dalip Singh Rana
5	Salman Khan; Sanjay Dutt	Karjat	97	2 October 2011	7 January 2012	Colors TV	98	18	₹1 crore (US$110,000)	Juhi Parmar	Mahek Chahal
6	Salman Khan	Lonavala	96	7 October 2012	12 January 2013	Colors TV	97	19	₹50 lakh (US$53,000)	Urvashi Dholakia	Imam Siddique
7	Salman Khan	Lonavala	105	15 September 2013	28 December 2013	Colors TV	105	20	₹50 lakh (US$53,000)	Gauahar Khan	Tanishaa Mukerji
8	Salman Khan	Lonavala	105	21 September 2014	3 January 2015	Colors TV	105	19	N/A	Declared in Bigg Boss Halla Bol	Declared in Bigg Boss Halla Bol
HB	Farah Khan	Lonavala	27	4 January 2015	31 January 2015	Colors TV	28	10	₹25 lakh (US$27,000)	Gautam Gulati	Karishma Tanna
9	Salman Khan	Lonavala	104	11 October 2015	23 January 2016	Colors TV	105	20	₹50 lakh (US$53,000)	Prince Narula	Rishabh Sinha
10	Salman Khan	Lonavala	105	16 October 2016	29 January 2017	Colors TV	106	18	₹50 lakh (US$53,000)	Manveer Gurjar	Bani J
11	Salman Khan	Lonavala	106	1 October 2017	14 January 2018	Colors TV	106	19	₹44 lakh (US$47,000)	Shilpa Shinde	Hina Khan
12	Salman Khan	Lonavala	107	16 September 2018	30 December 2018	Colors TV	105	20	₹30 lakh (US$32,000)	Dipika Kakar	S. Sreesanth
13	Salman Khan	Film City, Mumbai	139	29 September 2019	15 February 2020	Colors TV	141	21	₹40 lakh (US$43,000)	Sidharth Shukla	Asim Riaz
14	Salman Khan	Film City, Mumbai	142	3 October 2020	21 February 2021	Colors TV	142	22	₹36 lakh (US$38,000)	Rubina Dilaik	Rahul Vaidya
15	Salman Khan	Film City, Mumbai	121	2 October 2021	30 January 2022	Colors TV	120	24	₹40 lakh (US$43,000)	Tejasswi Prakash	Pratik Sehajpal
16	Salman Khan	Film City, Mumbai	135	1 October 2022	12 February 2023	Colors TV	134	17	₹31.8 lakh (US$34,000)	MC Stan	Shiv Thakare
17	Salman Khan	Film City, Mumbai	106	15 October 2023	28 January 2024	Colors TV	106	21	₹50 lakh (US$53,000)	Munawar Faruqui	Abhishek Kumar
18	Salman Khan	Film City, Mumbai	106	6 October 2024	19 January 2025	Colors TV	107	23	₹50 lakh (US$53,000)	Karan Veer Mehra	Vivian Dsena
19	Salman Khan	Film City, Mumbai	106	24 August 2025	7 December 2025	Colors TV	105	18	₹50 lakh (US$53,000)	Gaurav Khanna	Farrhana Bhatt
20	Salman Khan	Film City, Mumbai	TBA	6 September 2026	TBA	Colors TV	TBA	TBA	TBA	TBA	TBA

== Spin-off ==
The series also has a digital version of the show called Bigg Boss OTT. Started in 2021, the first season was hosted by Karan Johar and broadcast by Voot for 24×7 coverage.

The second season aired on 2023 and was hosted by Salman Khan and broadcast by JioCinema for the 24x7 live feed.

The OTT series rolled out its third season in 2024, hosted by Anil Kapoor and broadcast by JioCinema for the 24x7 live feed.

== Reception ==
=== Season 1 ===
The inaugural season received a modest response in terms of television viewership during its original run on Sony Entertainment Television, averaging a 1.96 TVR according to aMap ratings. Despite its moderate performance, the season attracted considerable media attention for its celebrity contestants and the reality show's format.

=== Season 2 ===
The second season opened to strong viewership on Colors TV, with its premiere drawing over four million viewers and topping its time slot among general entertainment channels according to aMap ratings. During its run, the season received mixed responses, with some critics commenting that the show's increasing focus on conflicts, abusive language, and controversial behaviour had reduced its appeal as family entertainment.

=== Season 3 ===
The third season opened to a strong response, with Amitabh Bachchan's debut as host contributing to a record premiere viewership of nearly 11 million viewers and a launch TVR of 6.0 according to aMap ratings. The season received positive attention from the media, with Bachchan's hosting being widely praised for bringing a fresh approach to the show and helping revive audience interest following the previous season.

=== Season 4 ===
The fourth season received widespread media attention for its contestants, high-profile controversies, and Salman Khan's debut as host. The season generated significant discussion following the inclusion of Pamela Anderson as a guest and the on-screen wedding of contestants Sara Khan and Ali Merchant, both of which attracted considerable public interest.

=== Season 5 ===
The fifth season received a mixed response from audiences and critics. The season gained attention for its controversial incidents, celebrity contestants, and the participation of Pamela Anderson as a guest. While the show continued to attract media coverage, several aspects of the season, including frequent conflicts between housemates, received criticism.

=== Season 6 ===
The sixth season received a mixed response from critics and audiences. The season attracted attention for its comparatively restrained approach and the performances of its contestants, particularly Urvashi Dholakia and Imam Siddique, whose interactions and personalities became among the most discussed aspects of the season. Salman Khan's hosting was also positively received during the season's run.

=== Season 7 ===
The seventh season received a positive response from audiences and generated significant media attention during its broadcast. The season was noted for its memorable contestants, frequent discussions surrounding housemate relationships and conflicts, and Salman Khan's hosting. Gauahar Khan and Tanisha Mukerji emerged as two of the most discussed contestants of the season, with Gauahar Khan eventually winning the title.

=== Season 8 ===
The eighth season received a mixed response from critics and audiences. The season gained attention for its high-profile contestants, frequent controversies, and dramatic moments inside the house. The introduction of the "Bigg Boss Halla Bol" extension after the finale also generated discussion among viewers and media. The season was noted for its increased focus on entertainment and conflicts compared to previous editions.

=== Season 9 ===
The ninth season received a mixed response from critics and audiences. The season attracted attention for its "Double Trouble" theme, controversial moments, and the dynamics created by pairing contestants inside the house. While the season continued to generate discussion and media coverage, it also faced criticism for its lack of engaging content and reliance on conflicts during its run.

=== Season 10 ===
The tenth season received a positive response for introducing common people alongside celebrities for the first time in the show's history. The change in format attracted significant media attention, with the season being promoted around the participation of "Indiawale" (commoners) competing with celebrity contestants. The season also generated discussion throughout its run due to its controversies and dramatic moments inside the house.

=== Season 11 ===
The eleventh season received a positive response from audiences and generated significant media attention during its run. The season was noted for its mix of celebrities and commoners, dramatic tasks, and frequent controversies inside the house. While some critics questioned the focus on conflicts and arguments, the season was widely discussed for its entertainment value and became one of the most talked-about editions of the show.

=== Season 12 ===
The twelfth season received a mixed response from critics and audiences. The season introduced a "vichitra jodis" (unusual pairs) theme, but the format and overall content received criticism for lacking freshness compared to previous editions. Critics also felt that the season relied heavily on conflicts and controversies rather than engaging tasks and strong storytelling.

=== Season 13 ===
The thirteenth season received a mixed to positive response from audiences and generated significant media attention during its run. The season was noted for its high level of drama, strong rivalries, and controversial moments inside the house. While some critics criticised the emphasis on conflicts and arguments, others praised the season's entertainment value and its ability to maintain viewer interest throughout its extended run. The season was also described by media outlets as one of the most successful editions of the show.

=== Season 14 ===
The fourteenth season received a mixed response from critics and audiences. The season attracted attention for its "Ab Scene Paltega" theme, the introduction of former contestants as "Toofani Seniors" at the beginning of the show, and the changes made to the format. While some critics appreciated the attempt to bring new twists to the series, others felt that the season took time to build momentum and relied heavily on conflicts and controversies for entertainment.

=== Season 15 ===
The fifteenth season received a mixed response from critics and audiences. The season attracted attention for its jungle-themed format, extended outdoor setup during the initial weeks, and frequent controversies among housemates. While the show generated discussion throughout its run, some critics felt that the season struggled to maintain the impact of previous editions and received criticism for its uneven pacing and content.

=== Season 16 ===
The sixteenth season received a positive response from critics and audiences. The season was praised for its engaging format, strong entertainment value, and increased audience interest throughout its run. The introduction of the "Bigg Boss 16" theme and the show's emphasis on house dynamics, tasks, and rivalries generated significant discussion during its broadcast. Critics also noted the season's improved content and entertaining moments compared to previous editions.

=== Season 17 ===
The seventeenth season received a mixed to positive response from critics and audiences. The season attracted attention for its "Dil, Dimaag aur Dum" theme, emphasis on relationships and personal dynamics, and frequent controversies inside the house. While some critics praised the entertainment value and engaging format, others felt that the season relied heavily on arguments and conflicts. The season generated considerable discussion throughout its broadcast.

=== Season 18 ===
The eighteenth season received a mixed response from critics and audiences. The season attracted attention for its "Time Ka Taandav" theme, changing house dynamics, and the introduction of new format elements. While the season generated discussion for its dramatic moments and controversies, some critics felt that the show struggled to maintain the freshness and impact of earlier editions. The season continued to receive media coverage throughout its broadcast for its entertainment value and housemate interactions.

=== Season 19 ===
The nineteenth season received a positive response from audiences and became one of the most successful editions of the show. The season attracted significant attention for its "Gharwalon Ki Sarkaar" theme, format changes, and dramatic moments throughout its run. It achieved record-breaking viewership across television and digital platforms, with increased digital reach and watch-time compared to previous seasons. The season was also widely discussed for its entertainment value and strong audience engagement.

== Other media ==
Bigg Boss 4, a mobile video game based on the fourth season was released by Indiagames.
