= Amritsar Lok Sabha constituency =

Lok Sabha Constituency in Punjab, India

Coordinates: 31.66°N 74.87°E

Amritsar PB-2
- Lok Sabha constituency
- Interactive Map Outlining Amritsar Lok Sabha constituency

Constituency details
- Country: India
- State: Punjab
- Assembly constituencies: Ajnala; Raja Sansi; Majitha; Amritsar North; Amritsar West; Amritsar Central; Amritsar East; Amritsar South; Attari
- Established: 1952

Member of Parliament
- 18th Lok Sabha
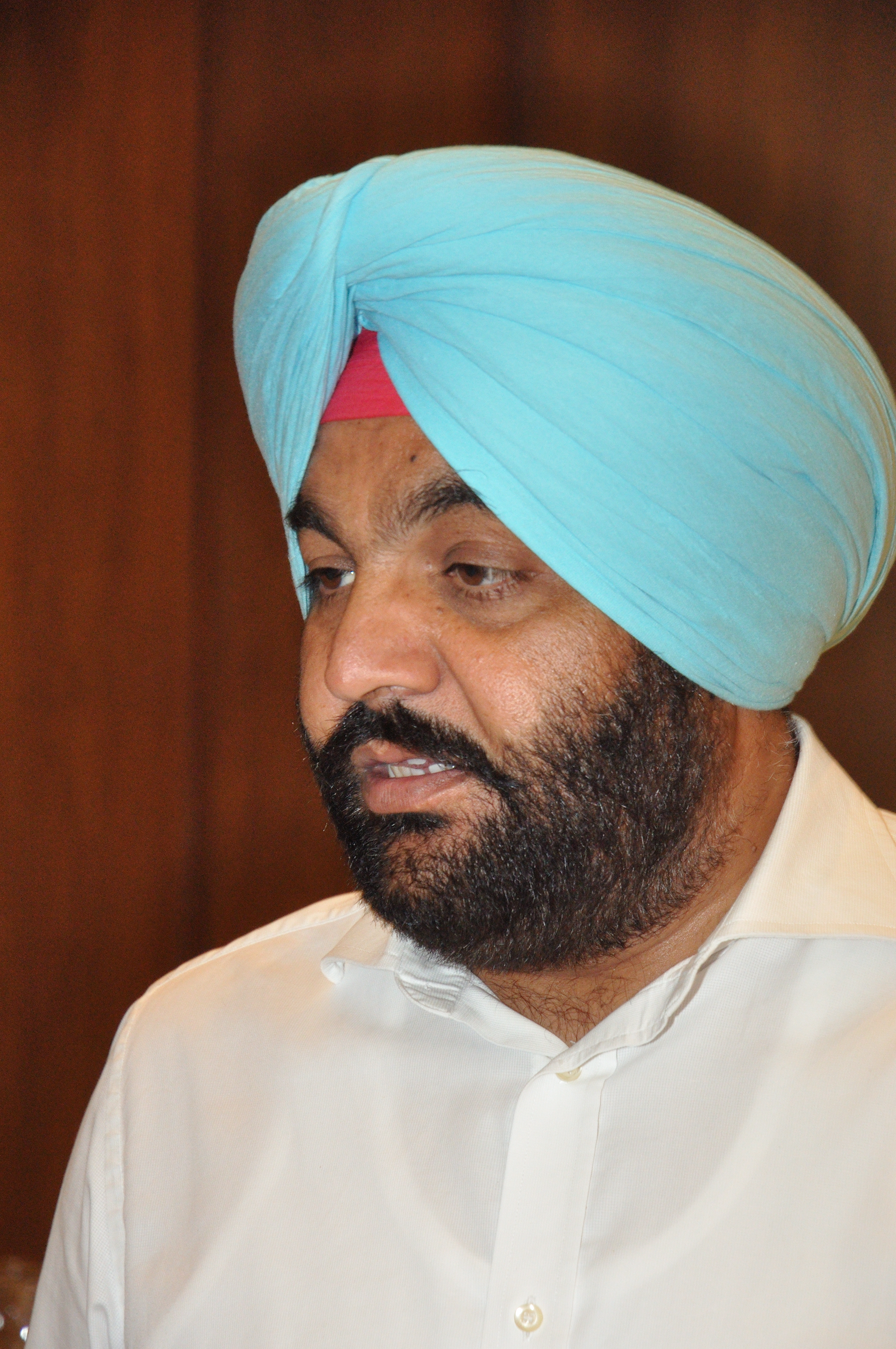
- Incumbent Gurjeet Singh Aujla
- Party: INC
- Alliance: INDIA
- Elected year: 2024

Amritsar Lok Sabha constituency is one of the 13 Lok Sabha (parliamentary) constituencies in the Indian state of Punjab, represented since 2017 by Gurjeet Singh Aujla of the Congress party.The Minister of Finance of India (2014–2019), Arun Jaitley, unsuccessfully contested this constituency for the BJP in 2014.

== Assembly segments ==
Amritsar Lok Sabha constituency comprises nine Vidhan Sabha (legislative assembly) segments, which are:

#	Name	District	Member	Party	Leading (in 2024)
11	Ajnala	Amritsar	Kuldeep Singh Dhaliwal	AAP	AAP
12	Raja Sansi	Amritsar	Sukhbinder Singh Sarkaria	INC	INC
13	Majitha	Amritsar	Ganieve Kaur Majithia	SAD	SAD
15	Amritsar North	Amritsar	Kunwar Vijay Pratap Singh	AAP	BJP
16	Amritsar West (SC)	Amritsar	Jasbir Singh Sandhu	AAP	INC
17	Amritsar Central	Amritsar	Ajay Gupta	AAP	BJP
18	Amritsar East	Amritsar	Jeevan Jyot Kaur	AAP	BJP
19	Amritsar South	Amritsar	Inderbir Singh Nijjar	AAP	AAP
20	Attari (SC)	Amritsar	Jaswinder Singh Ramdas	AAP	INC

== Members of Parliament ==
Year	Member	Party
1952	Gurmukh Singh Musafir	Indian National Congress
1957	Gurmukh Singh Musafir	Indian National Congress
1962	Gurmukh Singh Musafir	Indian National Congress
1967	Yagya Dutt Sharma	Bharatiya Jana Sangh
1971	Durgadas Bhatia	Indian National Congress
1972^	Raghunandan Lal Bhatia	Indian National Congress
1977	Baldev Prakash	Bharatiya Lok Dal
1980	Raghunandan Lal Bhatia	Indian National Congress
1984	Raghunandan Lal Bhatia	Indian National Congress
1989	Kirpal Singh	Independent
1991	Raghunandan Lal Bhatia	Indian National Congress
1996	Raghunandan Lal Bhatia	Indian National Congress
1998	Daya Singh Sodhi	Bharatiya Janata Party
1999	Raghunandan Lal Bhatia	Indian National Congress
2004	Navjot Singh Sidhu	Bharatiya Janata Party
2007^	Navjot Singh Sidhu	Bharatiya Janata Party
2009	Navjot Singh Sidhu	Bharatiya Janata Party
2014	Amarinder Singh	Indian National Congress
2017^	Gurjeet Singh Aujla	Indian National Congress
2019	Gurjeet Singh Aujla	Indian National Congress
2024	Gurjeet Singh Aujla	Indian National Congress

^ by-poll

== Election results ==
Vote share of winning candidates
2024	28.18%
2019	51.78%
2017	50.09%
2014	47.94%
2009	48.13%
2007	50.60%
2004	55.38%
1999	50.29%
1998	56.07%
1996	41.03%

=== 2024 ===
2024 Indian general election: Amritsar
Party	Candidate	Votes	%	±%
INC	Gurjeet Singh Aujla	255,181	28.18	▼23.60
AAP	Kuldeep Singh Dhaliwal	214,880	23.73	▲21.39
BJP	Taranjit Singh Sandhu	207,205	22.88	▼17.31
SAD	Anil Joshi	162,896	17.99	New
SAD(A)	Emaan Singh Mann	26,796	2.96	New
NOTA	None of the Above	3,714	0.41	▼0.61
Majority		40,301	4.45	▼7.14
Turnout		905,656		
Registered electors		1,611,263		
INC hold		Swing	▼23.60	

=== General election 2019 ===
2019 Indian general elections: Amritsar
Party	Candidate	Votes	%	±%
INC	Gurjeet Singh Aujla	445,032	51.78	▲1.69
BJP	Hardeep Singh Puri	345,406	40.19	▲9.74
AAP	Kuldeep Singh Dhaliwal	20,087	2.34	▼12.44
CPI	Daswinder Kaur	16,335	1.90	▲0.14
NOTA	None of the Above	8,763	1.02	▲0.06
Majority		99,626	11.59	▼8.05
Turnout		860,582	57.07	▼13.32
INC hold		Swing		

==== By-election - 2017 ====
Bye-Election, 2017: Amritsar
Party	Candidate	Votes	%	±%
INC	Gurjeet Singh Aujla	508,153	50.09	▲2.15
BJP	Rajinder Mohan Singh Chhina	308,964	30.45	▼7.29
AAP	Upkar Singh Sandhu	149,984	14.78	▲6.58
CPI	Daswinder Kaur	17,886	1.76	▲0.48
None of the Above	None of the Above	9,747	0.96	▲0.71
Majority		199,189	19.64	▲9.44
Turnout		1,016,125	70.50	▲2.31
INC hold		Swing		

=== General election 2014 ===
2014 Indian general elections: Amritsar
Party	Candidate	Votes	%	±%
INC	Amarinder Singh	482,876	47.94	▲0.65
BJP	Arun Jaitley	380,106	37.74	▼10.39
AAP	Dr. Daljit Singh	82,633	8.20	new
CPI	Amarjit Singh Asal	12,902	1.28	N/A
BSP	Pardeep Singh Walia	5,870	0.58	▼0.78
NOTA	None of the Above	2,533	0.25	N/A
Majority		102,770	10.20	▲9.36
Turnout		1,007,286	68.19	▲2.56
INC gain from BJP		Swing		

=== General election - 2009 ===
2009 Indian general election: Amritsar
Party	Candidate	Votes	%	±%
BJP	Navjot Singh Sidhu	392,046	48.13	▼2.47
INC	Om Parkash Soni	385,188	47.29	▲5.52
BSP	B. K. N. Chhibber	11,108	1.36	▼1.08
Independent	Lavinder Kumar	8,121	1.00	N/A
Independent	Naresh Singh Bhadauriya	3,357	0.41	N/A
Majority		6,858	0.84	▼7.99
Turnout		814,594	65.63	▼1.47
BJP hold		Swing		

==== By-election - 2007 ====
By Election, 2007: Amritsar
Party	Candidate	Votes	%	±%
BJP	Navjot Singh Sidhu	444,748	50.60	▼4.78
INC	Surinder Singla	367,122	41.77	▲1.78
BSP	Surinder Arjun Pandit	21,416	2.44	▲0.23
Independent	Gurvinder Singh Shampura	11,656	1.33	N/A
BSP (A)	Mukhjit Singh Bhullar	8,938	1.01	N/A
Majority		77,626	8.83	▼6.56
Turnout		878,992	67.10	▲12.05
BJP hold		Swing		

=== General election - 2004 ===
2004 Indian general election: Amritsar
Party	Candidate	Votes	%	±%
BJP	Navjot Singh Sidhu	394,223	55.38	▲10.30
INC	Raghunandan Lal Bhatia	2,84,691	39.99	▼10.51
BSP	Ram Sharan Paul	15,796	2.21	N/A
Independent	Ramesh Talwar	5,695	0.80	N/A
Independent	Rehmat Masih	3,252	0.45	N/A
Majority		1,09,532	15.39	▲9.97
Turnout		7,11,820	55.05	▲7.67
BJP gain from INC		Swing		

=== General election - 1999 ===
1999 Indian general election: Amritsar
Party	Candidate	Votes	%	±%
INC	Raghunandan Lal Bhatia	296,533	50.29	▲8.37
BJP	Daya Singh Sodhi	2,64,534	44.87	▼11.2
SHSAD	Bhupinder Singh Mann	17,581	2.98	N/A
Independent	Chaturbhuj Joshi	2,444	0.41	N/A
Independent	Ramesh Talwar	2,219	0.38	N/A
Majority		31,999	5.42	▼8.73
Turnout		5,89,600	47.38	▼6.37
INC gain from BJP		Swing		

=== General election - 1998 ===
1998 Indian general election: Amritsar
Party	Candidate	Votes	%	±%
BJP	Daya Singh Sodhi	361,133	56.07	▲43.24
INC	Raghunandan Lal Bhatia	2,69,993	41.92	▲0.89
Independent	Durga Dass	5,746	0.89	N/A
BSP (A)	Amarjit Kaur Gopalpura	3,277	0.51	N/A
RJD	Kirpal Singh	1,484	0.23	N/A
Majority		91,140	14.15	▲9.00
Turnout		6,44,112	53.75	▼3.91
BJP gain from INC		Swing		

=== General election - 1996 ===
1996 Indian general election: Amritsar
Party	Candidate	Votes	%	±%
INC	Raghunandan Lal Bhatia	268,490	41.03	
JD	Kirpal Singh	2,34,818	35.88	
BJP	Baldev Raj Chawla	83,981	12.83	
SAD(A)	Daljit Singh Sandhu	19,980	3.05	
AIIC(T)	Kewal Krishan	12,430	1.90	
Independent	Rehmat Masih	11,669	1.78	
Majority		33,672	5.15	
Turnout		6,54,439	57.66	
INC hold		Swing		

== See also ==
- Amritsar district
- List of constituencies of the Lok Sabha
