= Daya Singh Sodhi =

Indian politician

MP of Lok Sabha for Amritsar
- In office 1998–1999
- Preceded by: Raghunandan Lal Bhatia
- Succeeded by: Raghunandan Lal Bhatia

Personal details
- Born: 1 February 1925 Butala District Amritsar
- Died: 15 July 2011 (aged 86) Amritsar, Punjab, India
- Party: Bhartiya Janata Party
- Spouse: Shmt KAILASH SODHI
- Children: 1
- Parent(s): S, Kartar Singh Sodhi
- Education: Graduate
- Profession: Business

Daya Singh Sodhi (1 February 1925 – 15 July 2011) was an Indian politician from Amritsar, a city of Punjab and a member of Bharatiya Janata Party. He was born on 1 February 1925 at Butala village of Amritsar district. In 1991 he was elected for Amritsar Municipal Corporation and In 1998 he was elected for the Amritsar Lok Sabha seat as BJP candidate. Singh Sodhi died from cardiac arrest on 15 July 2011, at the age of 86.
