= Navjot Singh Sidhu =

Indian politician and cricketer (born 1963)

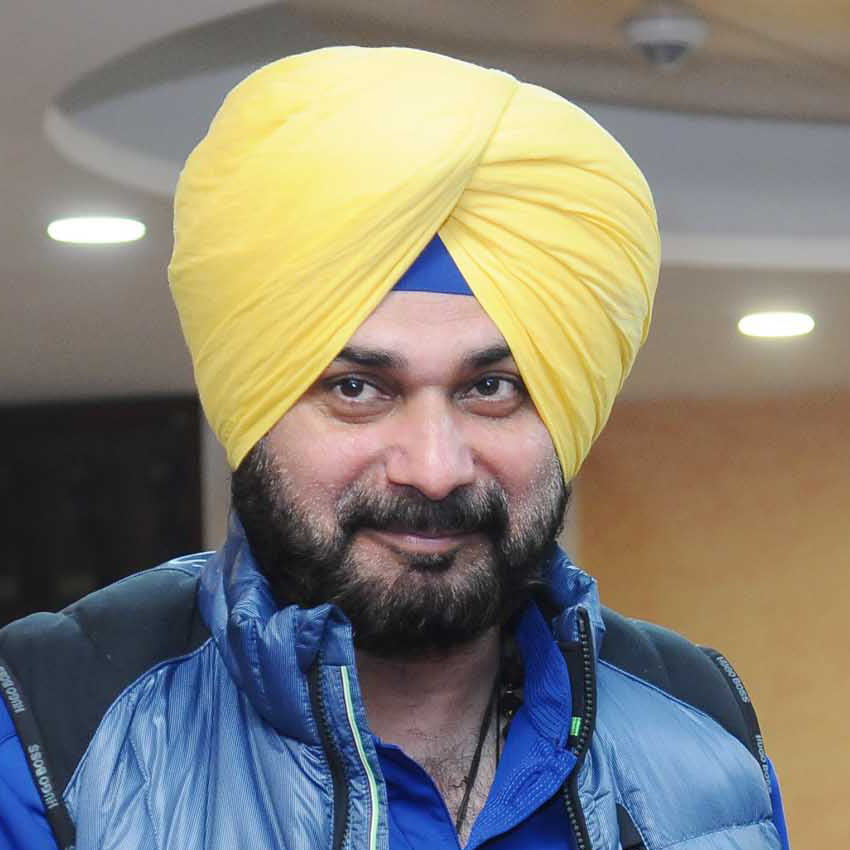
- Sidhu in 2018

Member of the Punjab Legislative Assembly
- In office 11 March 2017 – 10 March 2022
- Preceded by: Navjot Kaur Sidhu
- Succeeded by: Jeevan Jyot Kaur
- Constituency: Amritsar East

President of Punjab Pradesh Congress Committee
- In office 18 July 2021 – 9 April 2022
- Preceded by: Sunil Jakhar
- Succeeded by: Amrinder Singh Raja Warring

Punjab Minister of Tourism and Cultural Affairs
- In office 16 March 2017 – 20 July 2019
- Chief Minister: Amarinder Singh
- Succeeded by: Charanjit Singh Channi

Member of Parliament, Rajya Sabha
- In office 25 April 2016 – 18 July 2016
- Nominated by: Pranab Mukherjee
- Preceded by: Ashok Sekhar Ganguly
- Succeeded by: Roopa Ganguly
- Constituency: Nominated (Sports)

Member of Parliament, Lok Sabha
- In office 22 May 2004 – 13 May 2014
- Preceded by: Raghunandan Lal Bhatia
- Succeeded by: Amarinder Singh
- Constituency: Amritsar, Punjab

Personal details
- Pronunciation: [nəʋd͡ʒoːt̪ sɪ˩˥ŋɡ sɪ˦d̪ːuː]
- Born: 20 October 1963 (age 63) Patiala, Punjab, India
- Party: Indian National Congress (2017–Present)
- Other political affiliations: Bharatiya Janata Party (2004–2016); Aawaaz-e-Punjab (2016-2017)
- Spouse: Navjot Kaur Sidhu
- Education: H.R. College of Commerce and Economics; Government Mohindra College
- Occupation: Politician; cricketer; media personality
- Nickname(s): Sherry, Sixer Sidhu, Jonty Singh
- Cricket career

Cricket information
- Batting: Right-handed
- Bowling: Right-arm medium
- Role: Batsman

International information
- National side: India (1983–1999)
- Test debut (cap 166): 12 November 1983 v West Indies
- Last Test: 6 January 1999 v New Zealand
- ODI debut (cap 61): 9 October 1987 v Australia
- Last ODI: 20 September 1998 v Pakistan

Domestic team information
- Years: Team
- 1981–2000: Punjab

Career statistics
Competition	Test	ODI	FC	LA
Matches	51	136	157	205
Runs scored	3,202	4,413	9,571	7,186
Batting average	42.13	37.08	44.31	41.77
100s/50s	9/15	6/33	27/50	10/55
Top score	201	134*	286	139
Catches/stumpings	9/–	20/–	50/–	31/–
Medal record
Men's Cricket
Representing India
ACC Asia Cup
Winner	1988 Bangladesh
Winner	1990–91 India
Winner	1995 United Arab Emirates
Runner-up	1997 Sri Lanka
- Source: ESPNcricinfo, 1 January 2009
- Criminal information
- Status: Released
- Convictions: 2022
- Criminal charge: Voluntarily Causing Hurt (Section 323 of the Indian Penal Code)
- Penalty: 1 Year (Rigorous Imprisonment)
- Capture status: Released

Details
- Victims: 1
- Date: 27 December 1988
- Killed: 1
- Weapon: No
- Imprisoned at: Patiala Prison

Navjot Singh Sidhu (Punjabi pronunciation: [nəʋd͡ʒoːt̪(ə̆) sɪ˩˥ŋɡ sɪ˦d̪ːuː]; born 20 October 1963) is an Indian former cricketer, television personality and politician from the Indian National Congress. He is the former President of Punjab Pradesh Congress Committee. Formerly, he was the Minister of Tourism and Cultural Affairs in the state government of State of Punjab. Sidhu joined the Bharatiya Janata Party in 2004 and contested the general election from Amritsar that year. He won the election and held the seat till 2014 winning also the next election. He was nominated to the Rajya Sabha in 2016 from Punjab before he resigned from the position the same year and quit the party. In 2017, he joined the Indian National Congress and was elected to the Punjab Legislative Assembly from Amritsar East. He lost in 2022 Punjab Legislative Assembly election from Amritsar East Assembly constituency.

As a professional cricketer, Sidhu had a career spanning over 19 years after his first-class debut in 1981–82. After losing his place in the national team following his international debut in 1983–84, he returned to score four half-centuries in the 1987 World Cup. Playing mostly as a top-order batter, Sidhu went on to play in 51 Tests and 136 One-Day-Internationals for his country. He came to be known for his six-hitting ability and earned the sobriquet "Sixer Sidhu". He was part of the Indian squads that won the 1988 Asia Cup, the 1990–91 Asia Cup and the 1995 Asia Cup and semi finalists in the 1987 Cricket World Cup and 1996 Cricket World Cup.

After retirement, he turned to commentary and television, most notably as a judge of comedy shows, and as a permanent guest in Comedy Nights with Kapil (2013–2015) and later The Kapil Sharma Show (2016–2019). He was a contestant in the reality television show Bigg Boss (2012) and was seen in the show Kyaa Hoga Nimmo Kaa.

In 1988, Sidhu was involved in road rage incident of assault and causing the death of a man. In May 2022, the Supreme Court of India convicted him of voluntarily causing hurt (Section 323 of the Indian Penal Code) and sentenced him to 1 year rigorous imprisonment. He was released after serving nearly 10 months of his sentence at Patiala Jail.

== Early life and biography ==
Sidhu was born in Patiala, Punjab, India on 20 October 1963. His father, Sardar Bhagwant Singh was a lawyer and wanted to his son to become a top-class cricketer. Sidhu is an alumnus of Yadavindra Public School, Patiala. He studied in Mumbai at HR College of Commerce and Economics. Sidhu was elected to the Lok Sabha as a member from Amritsar in 2004 on a Bharatiya Janata Party ticket; he later resigned, following his conviction in 2006. After the Supreme Court stayed his conviction, he successfully contested the Amritsar Lok Sabha seat, defeating his Congress rival, State Finance Minister Surinder Singla, by 77,626 votes. He is also the present president of World Jat Aryan Foundation. He is a vegetarian.

He is married to Navjot Kaur Sidhu, a doctor and a former member of Punjab Legislative Assembly.

== Personal life ==
Former Pakistani cricketer and prime minister Imran Khan is one of his good friends. Many times opposition politicians have criticised Sidhu for nepotism. Fellow players from his cricketing career call him by his nickname Sherry.

== Cricket career ==
=== Failure on debut and success at World Cup (1987) ===
Sidhu made his first-class debut in November 1981 playing for Punjab against Services in Amritsar. Opening the innings, he made 51 before he was run out, as his team won the match by an innings. He was called up to the Indian Test team in November 1983 after he scored a century (122) for the North Zone playing against the touring West Indies team the previous month. He was drafted to the Test team as a replacement to an injured Dilip Vengsarkar for the Third Test in Ahmedabad. He scored 20 runs in 90 minutes before he was booed out of the ground upon dismissal. After another modest score in the final Test in Madras (now Chennai), he was dropped from the team.

Sidhu was recalled to the national team only four years later, for the World Cup. Making his One Day International (ODI) debut against Australia in the first of the group stage games, he made a 79-ball 73, an innings that included five sixes and four fours. India went on to lose the match by a single run. After the game, Australia's captain Allan Border had remarked: "When the bloke hits the ball, it stays hit." In India's next game, against New Zealand, Sidhu scored a match-winning knock of 75, hitting four sixes and fours each, helping his team record its first win against them in World Cups. Sidhu scored two more successive fifties, against Australia and Zimbabwe (51 and 55 respectively), and in the process, became the first player to record four successive half-centuries on debut in ODIs. He carried his fine form into the Asia Cup the following year helping his team regain the trophy. He scored a half-century in the opening match against hosts Bangladesh before making another in the final (76 off 87 balls), receiving man of the match awards for both performances. He finished the tournament scoring three fifties in four innings aggregating to 179 runs and was named man of the tournament.

=== Return to Test team ===
Sidhu made his return to the Test side after five years, replacing Mohinder Amarnath, with a century in first innings of the Bangalore Test against New Zealand in November 1988. Batting for 295 minutes, he made 116 in 195 balls, an innings that included four sixes and 12 fours, punishing mostly the spinners, before he followed it up with an unbeaten 43 in the second innings, helping his team win by 172 runs. His second Test century came in the Fourth Test of India's Caribbean Tour later that season. He made 116 while opening the innings retiring hurt 30 minutes before end of play on day one after suffering from cramp in the legs. Wisden wrote, "Batting securely despite obvious flaws in technique, he reached his century in 324 minutes, off 216 balls, and hit eight fours." The innings was considered one of his best considering that the Sabina Park wicket was among the fastest in the world. He totalled 179 runs at an average of 29.83 for the series.

Touring Pakistan in 1989–90, Sidhu averaged 38.42 in four Tests, with his best performance coming in the Fourth test in Sialkot. He rescued India in their second innings when down 38/4 putting together a century stand with Sachin Tendulkar while making 97. He was named man of the match. Sidhu injured his wrist in the First Test of India's tour of New Zealand later that season, while facing an aggressive spell of fast bowling by Danny Morrison, ruling him out of the series. He had a poor tour of England and Australia averaging 11.20 and 20.40, totaling 56 and 102 runs respectively, both three-Test series. After poor performances at the domestic level, he was omitted from the 16-member side that was selected to tour South Africa starting October 1992. Ajay Jadeja replaced him in the squad.

Sidhu was recalled when England toured India later that season. He made his third Test hundred in the Second Test in Madras, scoring 106 off 273 balls while opening the innings. He struck a partnership with Tendulkar who made 165 taking their team to 560 before declaration. India went on to win the match and the series. Sidhu particularly attacked spinner John Emburey in his innings that included nine fours. He aggregated 235 in the series at 58.75. Sidhu was India's best performer in the ODI series that followed, scoring 287 runs at 57.40. He played two match-winning knocks: a 76 in Chandigarh followed by an unbeaten 134 in Gwalior. He received man of the match awards for both performances. The latter innings followed after India were down having lost two wickets with 4 runs on the board. Sidhu put together a 175-run stand with Mohammad Azharuddin for the third wicket. En route to his century, Sidhu passed 2,000 runs in ODIs. After India's series-leveling victory in the final game, Sidhu was given the man of the series award.

His first ODI century came against Pakistan in Sharjah in 1989 while his 134 against England at Gwalior in 1993 was his highest ODI score and the innings which he called his best when he retired in 1999. Sidhu told in an interview that an article criticising his dismal performance changed his cricketing life. After a string of poor performances in 1983, Rajan Bala, a noted cricket columnist, wrote an article on him titled "Sidhu: The Strokeless Wonder" in the Indian Express. It was an epiphany that changed his life and he started taking his cricketing career seriously.

After his improved performance in 1987 World Cup, the same columnist wrote an article titled "Sidhu: From Strokeless Wonder To A Palm-Grove Hitter", applauding his performance.

Sidhu scored over 500 Test runs in a year thrice (1993, 1994 and 1997). His only Test double century came during India's 1997 tour of the West Indies. In 1994, he scored 884 ODI runs. Sidhu was the first Indian batsman to score more than 5 centuries in one day internationals.

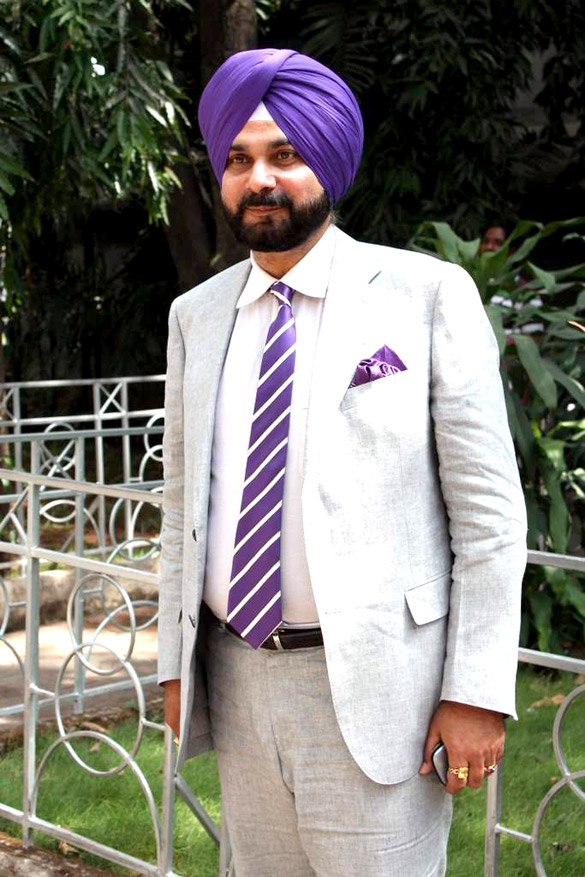
Navjot Singh Sidhu on the sets of Sony Max.

=== 201 against the West Indies and retirement ===
Sidhu walked out of India's 1996 tour of England citing differences with captain Mohammad Azharuddin. Following this, he was banished from the team for ten Tests by the BCCI eventually making a return in the 1996–97 tour of West Indies. He scored a double century in the Second Test at Port of Spain, his first in Tests. Coming off 488 balls in 671 minutes, it was one of the slowest in Test history. He reached his century on day two, and after having scored only 94 runs on the third day, reached the double on the morning of day four. En route, he put on a 171-run stand with Rahul Dravid and a 171-run stand with Tendulkar. The match ended in a draw. Barring the 201, Sidhu had an average series and aggregated 276 at 46.00 in six innings.

Sidhu was dropped from the Test side for the series against Pakistan after a poor tour of New Zealand in 1998–99.

He announced his retirement from all forms of cricket in December 1999. He played 51 Test matches and over 100 ODIs scoring over 7,000 international runs. He scored 27 First class centuries in an 18-year career.

Known for his tendency to attack spinners, he cracked eight sixes in 124 against Sri Lanka in 1993–94, and four fifties in five innings against the Australians in 1997–98, deliberately singling out Shane Warne.

Some of the nicknames he earned were "Sixer Sidhu" for his prolific batting performances and "Jonty Singh" with respect to his improved fielding in his late career, Jonty Rhodes being the best fielder at that time.

=== Career best performances ===
	Batting			
	Score	Fixture	Venue	Season
Test	201	West Indies v India	Queen's Park Oval, Port of Spain	1997
ODI	134*	India v England	Captain Roop Singh Stadium, Gwalior	1993
FC	286	Jamaica v Indians	Sabina Park, Kingston	1989
LA	139	Punjab v Jammu and Kashmir	Gandhi Sports Complex Ground, Amritsar	1996

== Commentator and television career ==
Sidhu started his career as a commentator when India toured Sri Lanka in 2001. As a commentator, he was noted for his one-liners, which came to be known as "Sidhuisms". Sony Max that broadcast the games from the series launched a website, sidhuisms.com, where one-liners from his commentary were posted as "Sidhuism of the day" and contests held for users to pick his best one-liner.

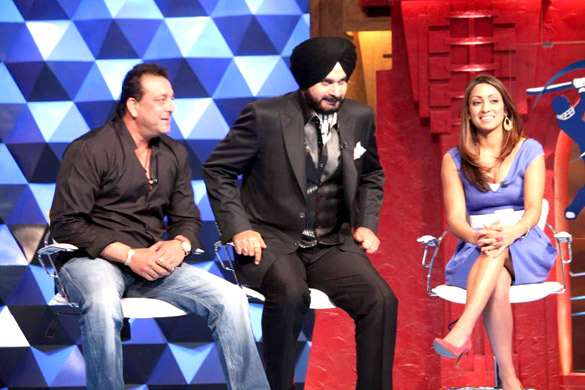
Sidhu (center) on Extraaa Innings T20 during IPL 2012 with Isa Guha (right) and guest Sanjay Dutt (left)

After he was sacked from ESPN-Star for swearing on air, Sidhu was signed up for commentary on Ten Sports. He also regularly appeared as an expert on various Indian news channels. Sidhu started to work again for ESPN Star Sports in 2012. He was a part of the team that commentated for Sony during the 2014 season of the Indian Premier League (IPL). This led to a dispute with Star India who alleged that Sidhu had breached his ₹22.5 crore contract with them by working for their competitor, and sought a refund.

Sidhu also figured as a judge on the television programme The Great Indian Laughter Challenge. He also appeared in other similar programmes, such as Funjabi Chak De. He acted in a TV series called Kareena Kareena as himself. He was a contestant on the reality show Bigg Boss 6, and had to make an exit from the show on account of political grounds in 2012.

In 2013, Sidhu was seen in the comedy show Comedy Nights with Kapil as a permanent guest until the show ended in 2016. He was seen as a permanent guest on The Kapil Sharma Show season 1 and 2 and Family Time With Kapil Sharma.

In early 2019, Sidhu caused controversy when he was interpreted as supporting Pakistan, in his response to the Pulwama Terrorist Attack that killed 40 personnel of India's border security forces. He was asked to leave season 2 of The Kapil Sharma Show that he had been a permanent guest on for a long time, and was replaced by Archana Puran Singh.

Cyrus Sahukar used to host a program on MTV, Piddhu the Great, where he is disguised as Piddhu, a lookalike of Sidhu. The one-liners in the program, similar to Sidhuisms, are called "Pidhuisms". A similar caricaturisation was performed on season 1 of The Kapil Sharma Show by Sunil Grover.

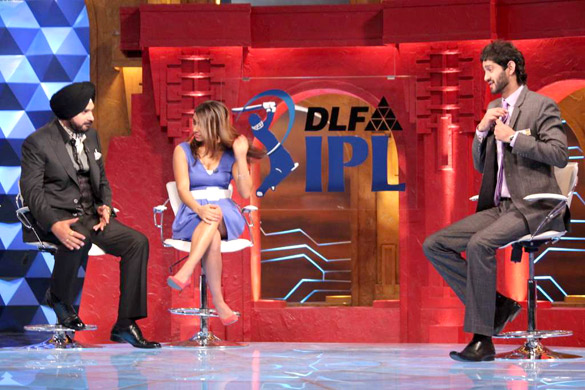
Sidhu (left) on Extraaa Innings T20, 2012

Sidhu made a cameo appearance in the 2004 Hindi film Mujhse Shaadi Karogi as a commentator during a cricket match. In the 2008 Punjabi language film Mera Pind, he appeared in a pivotal role alongside singer Harbhajan Mann, playing the role of a non-resident Indian who returns to his motherland despite living a successful life abroad. His most recent film appearance came in 2015 in ABCD 2; another cameo that saw him play the permanent guest in Comedy Nights with Kapil. Sidhu returned to commentary after a decade, for the 2024 season of the IPL, working for Star Sports.

Year	Show	Role(s)	Notes	Ref.
2005–2008	The Great Indian Laughter Challenge	Judge		
2006	Kyaa Hoga Nimmo Kaa	God		
2007–2008	Funjabbi Chak De	Judge		
2008–2015	Extraaa Innings T20	Himself	Member of expert panel	
2010	Entertainment Ke Liye Kuch Bhi Karega	Guest judge		
2012	Bigg Boss 6	Contestant	Walked, Day 34	
2013–2016	Comedy Nights with Kapil	Permanent guest		
2016–2017, 2018–2019	The Kapil Sharma Show	Permanent guest		
2017	Har Mard Ka Dard	Monty's father	Cameo Role	
2025–Present	The Great Indian Kapil Show	Permanent guest		
2024–Present	Indian Premier League	Commentator		
2001–Present	Indian Cricket/Star Sports	Commentator		

== Political career ==
=== Bharatiya Janata Party ===
Sidhu won on a Bharatiya Janata Party ticket from the Amritsar seat in the 2004 Indian general elections. After resigning due to a court case against him, he stood again after the ruling stayed. He won a by-election with a good majority. In the 2009 general elections defeating Om Prakash Soni of INC by 6858 votes. This was what Sidhu had to say after not being nominated as party's from Amritsar in the 2014 Indian general election.

Amritsar is the place where my work and action speaks for itself. Since, I started contesting elections from this holy place, I have promised myself never to abandon this place. Either, I will contest from Amritsar, or else I won't contest elections.

Reiterating that he has no opposition to the decision as he considered himself as Arun Jaitley's protege. However, he was firm on his stand of not contesting from any constituency while accepting the decision, wholeheartedly, announced by the party.

=== Rajya Sabha MP ===
Navjot Singh Sidhu took the oath as a member of the Rajya Sabha on 28 April 2016. As per reports, Sidhu was given the Rajya Sabha nomination in a bid to prevent him from joining the Aam Aadmi Party. However he resigned from the Rajya Sabha on 18 July 2016.

=== Aawaaz-e-Punjab ===
On 2 September 2016, Sidhu along with Pargat Singh and Bains brothers formed a new political front - Aawaaz-e-Punjab claiming to fight against those working against Punjab.

=== Indian National Congress ===
In January 2017, Sidhu joined the Indian National Congress. Contesting from Amritsar East in the 2017 Punjab Assembly elections, he won the election by a margin of 42,809 votes. He was sworn in as a minister in the cabinet.

As Minister of Tourism and Local Bodies, Sidhu contributed to the Project Virasat to revive India's only handicraft on UNESCO's list of Intangible Cultural Heritage. This craft of making brass utensils is professed by the Thatheras of Jandiala Guru area, which falls under his former Lok Sabha constituency of Amritsar.

In 2018, Sidhu went to Pakistan for swearing in event of Pakistan prime minister Imran Khan. At the event he had hugged Pakistani army head Qamar Javed Bajwa. Then Punjab Chief minister Amrinder Singh criticised him for doing this.

In June 2019, Sidhu was sacked from the Local Bodies Ministry and Tourism ministry by CM Amarinder Singh.

On 23 April 2019, the Indian Election Commission banned Sidhu from election campaigning for 72 hours for violating the model code of conduct. Earlier the Commission issued a notice to Sidhu for seeking votes on religion lines at a rally in Katihar district of Bihar.

On 14 July 2019, Sidhu tweeted a copy of his resignation from the Punjab Cabinet, dated 10 June 2019 and addressed to Rahul Gandhi. On 20 July 2019, Punjab Chief Minister Captain Amarinder Singh and Punjab Governor V.P. Singh Badnore accepted Sidhu's resignation. Later, Sidhu openly criticised the Punjab Government about their handling of the Sacrilege Case, however the party termed it as a diversity of views.

On 18 July 2021, Sidhu was appointed President of Punjab Pradesh Congress Committee replacing Shri Sunil Jakhar.

On 28 September 2021, Navjot Singh Sidhu resigned as Punjab Congress President. He sent his resignation letter to the party chief Sonia Gandhi. But high command rejected his resignation.

In the 2022 Punjab Legislative Assembly election, Sidhu, contesting from the Amritsar East seat, lost to Aam Aadmi Party candidate Jeevan Jyot Kaur and later resigned as PCC President.

=== Gurdwara Darbar Sahib Kartarpur Corridor ===
In August 2018, former Indian cricketer turned politician and current Tourism Minister of the Government of Punjab, Navjot Singh Sidhu was invited to the oath taking ceremony of the newly elected prime minister of Pakistan, Imran Khan. After being attacked over his decision to hug Qamar Javed Bajwa, the Chief of Army Staff of the Pakistan Army, Sidhu claimed that Bajwa had assured him of opening the corridor before the 550th birth anniversary of Guru Nanak.

Subsequently, Government of Pakistan in September 2018, decided to open the Kartarpur corridor before the 550th birth anniversary of Guru Nanak for visa-free entry of followers of Sikhism from India to Pakistan. After the corridor opening was confirmed by Pakistan's Information and Broadcasting Minister Fawad Chaudhry, Navjot Singh Sidhu appreciated his cricket friend Imran Khan for taking such a great step.

In late November 2018, Sidhu came under controversy with a photo of Khalistani separatist leader Gopal Singh Chawla, a controversial Khalistani separatist leader accused of having close ties with Hafiz Saeed. Sidhu dismissed those claims and claimed "Thousands of people met me every day in Pakistan and clicked photographs with me. How would I know who Chawla or Cheema is?".

== Controversies and conversations ==
=== Pulwama attack ===
On 15 February 2019, during an appearance on The Kapil Sharma Show, Sidhu condemned the recent attack on Indian soldiers in Pulwama, Jammu and Kashmir as "cowardly and dastardly". However, he found himself in a controversy when he went on to ask: "For a handful of people, can you blame the entire nation of Pakistan and can you blame an individual?"

The comments drew heavy criticism. BJP leader Giriraj Singh demanded that Sidhu be expelled from the Congress Party.

On 16 February, it was reported that The Kapil Sharma Show had responded by removing Sidhu as presenter and permanent guest, with Archana Puran Singh replacing him.

=== Balakot air strike ===
Sidhu criticised Indian Air force's anti-terrorism operation at Balakot in Pakistan. He questioned by tweet, 'Were you uprooting terrorist or trees?' Sidhu questioned the purpose of Balakot air strike.

== Conviction for road rage homicide ==
Sidhu (aged 25 in 1988) along with his friend Rupinder Singh Sandhu (aka Bunny Sandhu) were accused of assaulting and causing the death of a 65-year-old man named Gurnam Singh. On 27 December 1988, Sidhu and Sandhu were in their car parked near Sheranwala Gate Crossing in Patiala. Gurnam Singh in his car was on his way to a bank, and asked Sidhu to give them way. In the ensuing altercation, Gurnam was beaten by Sidhu who fled the scene. Gurnam was taken to a hospital where he was declared dead. According to a witness, Gurnam was killed by a blow to the head by Sidhu.

Sidhu was arrested by Punjab Police after the incident and was lodged in Patiala jail for several days. He was charged with murder along with Sandhu as co-accused. Sidhu pleaded not guilty and denied all charges against him. He claimed in court that he was "falsely involved in this case by the complainant party". Jaswinder Singh, nephew of Gurnam Singh, claimed that he was a witness to the quarrel and was ready to testify in the Supreme Court of India. In September 1999, the trial court acquitted Sidhu.

In 2006, the Punjab and Haryana High Court reversed the verdict of the trial court and held both of them guilty of culpable homicide not amounting to murder for the death of Gurnam Singh in Patiala. The court sent him to jail for three years in the road rage case.

Both the convicts then appealed in the Supreme Court of India. In 2007, the Supreme Court suspended Sidhu's sentence and granted him bail. The suspended sentence allowed him to contest the Lok Sabha bypolls from Amritsar. In 2018, a bench headed by Justices Chalemeswar and Sanjay Kishan Kaul let the two off with a fine of ₹ 1,000 without any jail term, saying "there was no evidence to prove that the death was caused by the single blow" dealt by Sidhu. The court noted that Sidhu did not use a weapon.

The complainants filed a review plea in the Supreme court. The court noted that the hand can also be used as a "weapon by itself where a boxer, wrestler, cricketer, or an extremely physically fit person inflicts a blow." The court said, "The blow was not inflicted on a person identically physically placed but a 65-year-old person, more than double his age. Respondent no.1 (Sidhu) cannot say that he did not know the effect of the blow or plead ignorance on this aspect." "It is not as if someone has to remind him of the extent of the injury which could be caused by a blow inflicted by him. In the given circumstances, tempers may have been lost but then the consequences of the loss of temper must be borne." Sidhu was judged guilty of the offence of simple hurt under section 323 of the Indian Penal Code (IPC). On 19 May 2022, the Supreme Court convicted him for voluntarily causing hurt (Section 323 of the Indian Penal Code) and sentenced him to 1 year rigorous imprisonment. Section 323 (punishment for voluntarily causing hurt) of IPC has a maximum jail term of up to one year or a fine up to Rs 1,000 or both.

He was imprisoned in Patiala Jail along with his rival Shiromani Akali Dal leader Bikram Singh Majithia against whom Sidhu contested in the 2022 Punjab Assembly elections. On 1 April 2023, he was released after spending nearly 10 months in jail.

== In popular culture ==
A Bollywood film Azhar released in 2016, directed by Tony D'Souza, was based on his teammate Mohammad Azharuddin's life and revolves around Match fixing scandals in late 90s and 2000. Sidhu's character was portrayed by Manjot Singh in the film.

== Electoral performance ==
=== Lok Sabha ===
Year	Constituency	Party	Votes	%	Opponent	Opponent Party	Opponent Votes	%	Result	Margin	%
2009	Amritsar	BJP	392,046	48.13	Om Parkash Soni	INC	385,188	47.29	Won	6,858	0.84
2007	Amritsar (by-election)	BJP	444,748	50.6	Surinder Singla	INC	367,122	41.77	Won	77,626	8.83
2004	Amritsar	BJP	394,223	55.38	Raghunandan Lal Bhatia	INC	284,691	39.99	Won	109,532	15.39

=== Punjab Legislative Assembly ===
Year	Constituency	Party	Votes	%	Opponent	Opponent Party	Opponent Votes	%	Result	Margin	%
2022	Amritsar East	INC	32,929	30.49	Jeevan Jyot Kaur	AAP	39,679	36.74	Lost	-6,750	-6.25
2017	Amritsar East	INC	60,477	60.68	Rakesh Kumar Honey	BJP	17,668	17.73	Won	42,809	42.95

Party political offices
Preceded by Sunil Kumar Jakhar	President; Punjab Pradesh Congress Committee; 2021 – 2022	Succeeded by Amrinder Singh Raja Warring
