= IFA =

IFA or Ifa may refer to:

== Organisations ==
=== Economics ===
- Independent financial adviser, a type of financial services professional in the UK
- Index Fund Advisors
- Institute and Faculty of Actuaries, representing actuaries in the UK
- Institute of Actuaries, in England, Wales and Northern Ireland
- Faculty of Actuaries, in Scotland
- Institute of Financial Accountants, representing accountants in the UK
- International Fiscal Association
- International Forfaiting Association

=== Sports ===
- Intercollegiate Fencing Association
- International Fistball Association

Football

- Indian Football Association, West Bengal, India
- Indoor Football Alliance
- Intercollegiate Football Association, college football organization, 1873–1893
- Iraq Football Association
- Irish Football Association, in Northern Ireland
- Islamabad Football Association
- Israel Football Association

=== Other organizations ===
- Illinois Family Action, the lobbying arm of the Illinois Family Institute in the US
- India Foundation for the Arts, a philanthropic organization
- Indo-GDR Friendship Association, in India
- Industrieverband Fahrzeugbau, East German vehicle manufacturer
- Institute for Archaeologists, in the UK
- Institute for Astronomy (Hawaii), maintains the Mauna Kea Observatory
- Institute for Astronomy (Edinburgh)
- Institute for Occupational Safety and Health of the German Social Accident Insurance, a German research institute near Bonn
- International Federation on Ageing
- International Fertilizer Industry Association, represents the global fertilizer industry
- International of Anarchist Federations, L'international des Federations Anarchistes
- Internationale Funkausstellung Berlin, a consumer electronics trade fair
- Irish Farmers' Association
- New York University Institute of Fine Arts, a graduate school of New York University

== Other uses ==
- Ifá, a system of divination that originated in West Africa
- Ifa, a character in 2020 video game Genshin Impact
- Inter-Island Ferry Authority, a ferry service in Alaska
- Interconnexion France-Angleterre, the HVDC Cross-Channel interconnector for the transfer of electricity between France and England
- Interest Flooding Attack, a denial-of-service attack
- Interferometer, a device to measure the interference pattern caused by differing waves
- Indirect Fluorescent Antibody, test
- Incomplete Freund's adjuvant, an antigen solution to boost the immune system
- In-Flight Abort, test in spaceflight industry
- Integrated framing assembly, a type of construction product used with Insulating concrete forms.
- International Fonetic Alfabet

== See also ==
- Aífe, a character in Irish mythology
- Aoife, an Irish given name
- Ivar F. Andresen (1896–1940), Norwegian opera singer
