= Hardeep Singh Puri =

Indian politician and diplomat (born 1952)

Hardeep Singh Puri IFS (Retd.)
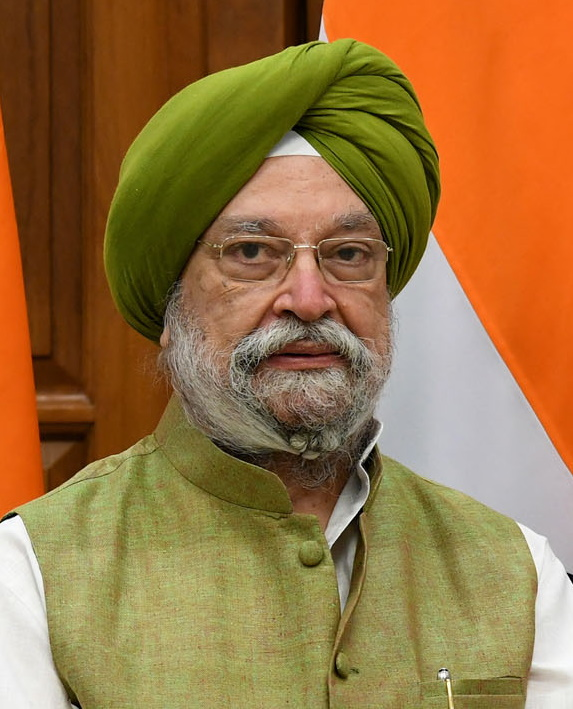
- Official portrait, 2021

Union Minister of Petroleum and Natural Gas
- Incumbent
- Assumed office 7 July 2021
- President: Ramnath Kovind; Droupadi Murmu
- Prime Minister: Narendra Modi
- Preceded by: Dharmendra Pradhan

Union Minister of Housing and Urban Affairs
- In office 3 September 2017 – 9 June 2024
- Prime Minister: Narendra Modi
- Preceded by: Narendra Singh Tomar
- Succeeded by: Manohar Lal Khattar

Union Minister of State for Civil Aviation (Independent Charge) and Commerce & Industry
- In office 30 May 2019 – 7 July 2021
- Prime Minister: Narendra Modi
- Preceded by: Suresh Prabhu
- Succeeded by: Jyotiraditya Scindia

Member of Parliament, Rajya Sabha
- Incumbent
- Assumed office 26 November 2026
- Preceded by: L. Murugan
- Constituency: Madhya Pradesh
- In office 9 January 2018 – 25 November 2026
- Preceded by: Manohar Parrikar
- Succeeded by: Prakash Pal
- Constituency: Uttar Pradesh

Permanent Representative of India to the United Nations
- In office 4 May 2009 – 27 February 2013
- President: Pratibha Patil; Pranab Mukherjee
- Prime Minister: Manmohan Singh
- Preceded by: Nirupam Sen
- Succeeded by: Asoke Kumar Mukerji

President of the United Nations Security Council
- In office August 2011 — September 2011; November 2012 — December 2012

Personal details
- Born: 15 February 1952 (age 74) Delhi, India
- Party: Bharatiya Janata Party
- Spouse: Lakshmi Murdeshwar Puri (m. 1975)
- Children: 2
- Education: Delhi University (BA, MA)
- Occupation: Politician
- Profession: Civil servant
- Website: hardeepsinghpuri.com

Hardeep Singh Puri (born 15 February 1952) is an Indian politician and retired diplomat of Indian Foreign Service who is serving as the Minister of Petroleum and Natural Gas since 2021.

He is a 1974 batch Indian Foreign Service officer who served as the Permanent Representative of India to the United Nations from 2009 to 2013. Puri served as the chairman of the United Nations Security Council's Counter Terrorism Committee from January 2011 to February 2013; and joined International Peace Institute as a senior advisor in June 2013.

Puri joined the Bharatiya Janata Party in January 2014, and became a Member of Parliament in the Rajya Sabha from Uttar Pradesh in November 2020. Earlier in May 2019, he had taken charge as the Minister of State (Independent Charge) for Housing and Urban Affairs and Civil Aviation and Minister of State for Commerce and Industry.

== Early life and education ==
Hardeep Singh Puri was born on 15 February 1952 in Daryaganj, Delhi. He was educated with a BA in history and an MA in political science at the Hindu College, a constituent college of the Delhi University. Drawn to student politics, Puri was elected as the prime minister of the college's student parliament.

== Diplomatic career ==
=== Civil service ===
Hardeep Puri joined the Indian Foreign Service in 1974, and has served as Joint secretary to the Government of India in the Ministry of External Affairs from 1994 to 1997, and from 1999 to 2002. He has also served as Joint secretary to the Government of India in Ministry of Defence from 1997 to 1999. He was India's ambassador to Brazil. He later served as Secretary to the Government of India (Economic Relations) in the Ministry of External Affairs from 2009 to 2013.

Puri has been stationed at important diplomatic posts in Brazil, where he was ambassador, Japan, Sri Lanka, and the United Kingdom where he was Deputy High Commissioner. Between 1988 and 1991, he was the Coordinator of the UNDP/UNCTAD Multilateral Trade Negotiations Project to help Developing Countries in the Uruguay Round of Multilateral Trade Negotiations.

=== United Nations ===
He also served as the chairman of the United Nations Security Council Counter-Terrorism Committee from January 2011 to February 2013, and as President of the United Nations Security Council in August 2011, and again in November 2012.

== Political career ==
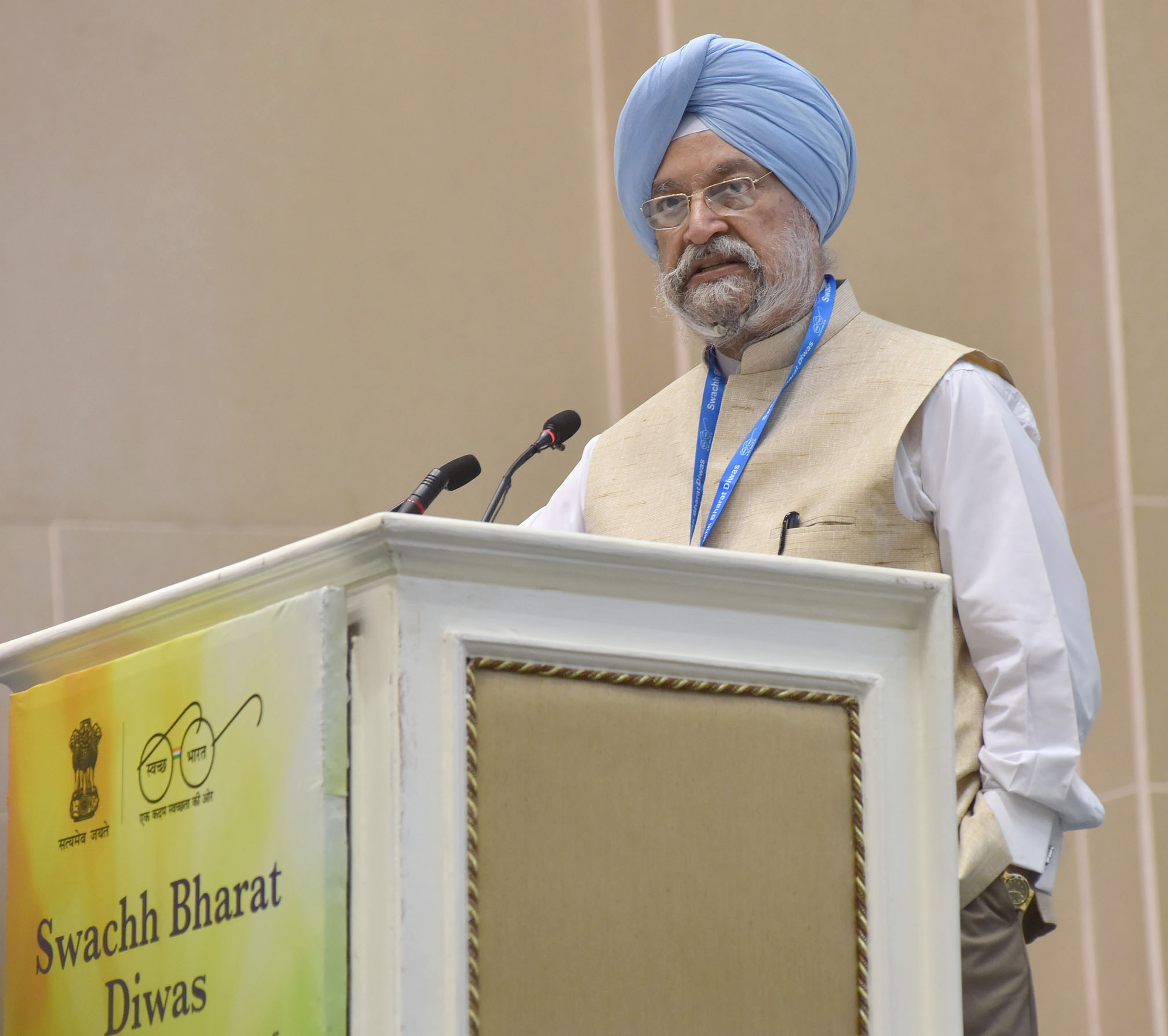
Hardeep Singh Puri addressing at an event, 2017

Hardeep Singh Puri joined the International Peace Institute as a senior advisor in June 2013. He joined the Bharatiya Janata Party in January 2014, expressing admiration for the party's approach to national security.

He is serving as the Member of Rajya Sabha from Uttar Pradesh from 2018. Puri was inducted into the cabinet as the Minister of Housing and Urban Affairs, after Venkaiah Naidu was elevated to the post of Vice President of India in 2017. In May 2019, he contested from Amritsar as a BJP Candidate, but lost to Gurjeet Singh Aujla of the Congress.

In May 2019, Puri became the Minister of State (with Independent Charge) for Civil Aviation and Minister of State for Commerce and Industry.

In July 2021, he was promoted to the post of Union Minister of Petroleum and Natural Gas, along with Union Minister for Housing and Urban Affairs in the Second Modi ministry when there was a cabinet overhaul.

In March 2022, during the Russian invasion of Ukraine, Puri served as part of a special four-minister envoy and brought 6,711 students back to India under Operation Ganga.

Speculations begin when puri rajyasabha membership ended this november. On 28 october 2026 BJP announced that puri will contest to rajyasabha bypoll in 12 november from madhya pradesh vacant seat of former union minister L. Murugan who resigned from third modi ministry.

== Electoral performance ==
2019 Indian general elections: Amritsar
Party	Candidate	Votes	%	±%
INC	Gurjeet Singh Aujla	445,032	51.78	▲1.69
BJP	Hardeep Singh Puri	345,406	40.19	▲9.74
AAP	Kuldeep Singh Dhaliwal	20,087	2.34	▼12.44
CPI	Daswinder Kaur	16,335	1.90	▲0.14
NOTA	None of the Above	8,763	1.02	▲0.06
Majority		99,626	11.59	▼8.05
Turnout		860,582	57.07	▼13.32
INC hold		Swing		

=== Rajya Sabha ===
Position	Party	Constituency	From	To	Tenure
Member of Parliament, Rajya Sabha (1st Term)	BJP	Uttar Pradesh	8 January 2018	25 November 2020	2 years, 322 days
Member of Parliament, Rajya Sabha (2nd Term)	BJP	Uttar Pradesh	26 November 2020	25 November 2026	5 years, 364 days

== Personal life ==
Hardeep Singh Puri is married to Ambassador Lakshmi Puri, of the Indian Foreign Service, and, later, the United Nations cadre, who is a former Assistant Secretary-General of the United Nations and a former Deputy Executive Director of UN Women. They have two daughters. His brother, Pradeep Puri, is an IAS officer of the 1979 batch, who played an instrumental role in the construction of the DND Flyway.

On 1 December 2022, Hardeep Singh Puri was awarded the Grand Cross of the Order of Rio Branco.

== Relationship with Jeffrey Epstein ==
In January 2026, email exchanges related to business networking and investment discussions between Puri and Jeffrey Epstein, an American financier and child sex offender, were found in the Epstein files. In a notable email, dated 24 September 2014, Epstein introduced Puri to Reid Hoffman, a co-founder of LinkedIn, and described Puri as "your man in India". In another notable email, dated 24 December 2014, Puri wrote to Epstein and referred to Little Saint James as his "exotic island". Puri did not deny emailing Epstein and said that he had met Epstein three or four times in a professional capacity as part of delegations while serving at the International Peace Institute. On 3 February 2026, Mahua Moitra of the Trinamool Congress alleged that Puri had called her and threatened her, demanding that she delete a tweet in which she had shared an image of a December 2014 email exchange between Puri and Epstein. In March 2026, Puri's daughter Himayani Puri filed a defamation suit in the Delhi High Court alleging that she was being targeted on social media and being falsely linked to Epstein. In October 2026, pictures from a meeting between Puri and Epstein with nobody else in frame, originally released in January, began circulating on social media; the pictures showed Puri dressed in a suit and sat across a table from Epstein, with papers and other items visible on the table. Several politicians from opposition parties made posts on social media raising questions about the meeting. Puri's office released a statement saying the pictures supported Puri’s account that his interactions with Epstein were related to work and showed a professional setting.

== Honours and awards ==
- Grand Cross of the Order of Rio Branco (1 December 2022) – awarded by the Government of Brazil.

== Bibliography ==
Hardeep is a published author of several books, research papers, and journals. Included below is a selection of his works:

=== Books ===
- Perilous Interventions: The Security Council and the Politics of Chaos (Publisher: HarperCollins, 2016; ISBN 978-9351777595)
- Delusional Politics: Back To The Future (Publisher: Penguin Viking, 2018; ISBN 978-0670090259)

=== Articles ===
- "Libya: Hillary Clinton, Susan Rice and the Ghost of Rwanda" (The Globalist, 2016)

== See also ==
- Manjeev Singh Puri
- Navtej Sarna
- Taranjit Singh Sandhu
- List of people named in the Epstein files

Political offices
Preceded by Narendra Singh Tomar	Minister of Housing and Urban Affairs; Minister of State with Independent charge until 7 July 2021; 3 September 2017 - Present	Incumbent
Preceded by Suresh Prabhu	Minister of Civil Aviation; Minister of State with Independent charge 30 May 2019 - 7 July 2021	Succeeded by Jyotiraditya Scindia
Preceded by Dharmendra Pradhan	Minister of Petroleum and Natural Gas; 7 July 2021 – Present	Incumbent
