= Bhag Singh =

Indian revolutionary

Dr. Bhag Singh

Member of the Punjab Legislative Assembly
- In office 1957–1962
- Preceded by: Harbhajan Singh; Kartar Singh
- Succeeded by: Rattan Singh
- Constituency: Garhshankar

Personal details
- Born: Missing required parameter 1=month! 1898 British India
- Died: 10 August 1966 (aged 67–68) India
- Party: Communist Party of India (Marxist) (1964–1966); Communist Party of India (until 1964)
- Education: National College of Arts; University of California
- Occupation: Teacher; Politician

Dr. Bhag Singh (1898–10 August 1966) was an Indian anti-imperialist revolutionary, freedom fighter, Kisan leader and Communist politician who was an active member of the Ghadar Party during the Indian independence movement and later became one of the founding members of the Communist Party of India (Marxist).

== Early life ==
Bhag Singh earned his master's degree from National College of Arts in Lahore, which was established by the Indian National Movement. He continued to work as a teacher in the Jhelum District in Punjab, now in Pakistan, and was active in both the Congress movement and the Gurdwara Reform Movement, which was launched by the Akali party against the British government's feudal stooges.

== Independence Movement in United States ==
After a few years, he left for the United States of America, where he came into contact with the Ghadar Movement and joined the Ghadar Party. For some time he edited "Hindustan Ghadar", the revolutionary organ of the party. During the same period, he obtained a doctorate in political science from the University of California. While working in the Ghadar Party, he began studying Marxism and Communism under the influence of the International Communist movement. In the early 1930s, the Ghadar Party asked him to return to India and organise peasants and workers, which he readily agreed.

== Independence Movement in India ==
On Dr. Bhag Singh's return to India, he became one of the founders of the All India Kisan Sabha and was active with the Workers and Peasants Party, famously known as the Kirti Kisan Party, for many years. In 1936 he started working as editor of "Kirti-Lehar" (Workers Movement). He was in the forefront of the Lahore Kisan Morcha organised by Punjab Kisan Sabha in 1939. The Lahore Kisan Morcha was meant to fight against the British Government for amplifying land revenue through fresh settlement in the district of Lahore before the outbreak of the World War II. It was an important phase in the struggle of peasants. The enhancement was made at a time when the whole peasantry had been hit badly due to a steep fall in the prices of crops and a prolonged drought in the 1930s, which had adversely affected the crop output. Approximately four thousand Kisans were also arrested and jailed in the course of the movement. Among important leaders who were imprisoned were Sohan Singh Bhakna and Dalip Singh Tapiala. The coercive attitude of the government could not melt the confidence and spirit of the fighters. The morcha carried on their operations very well for five months till September 4, 1939. The outbreak of the World War II changed the political scenario and has changed the perspectives of the revolutionary movement. After that, he started working on the editorial board of "Jang-e-Azadi" (War of Independence), published from Lahore, but soon after the war outbreak, he was arrested by the British government and detained along with communist leaders from all over the country in the Deoli Detention Camp.

== Communist Movement ==
Dr. Bhag Singh got elected as Joint Secretary of the All India Kisan Sabha along with M.A. Rasul, E. M. S. Namboodiripad, and P. Sundarayya at the 9th AIKS Conference held in Netrokona, Bangladesh, from 5 to 9 April 1945. The Congress government eventually cracked down on him and issued an arrest order for him after the country gained independence in 1947. While evading the warrant and remaining underground for some time, he was caught and detained until 1952.

Soon after being released from prison, he contested in the 1957 Punjab Legislative Assembly election as a Communist Party of India candidate from the Garhshankar Assembly constituency and eventually won the seat, becoming a Member of the Punjab Legislative Assembly. Dr. Bhag Singh again contested in the 1962 Punjab Legislative Assembly election from the same constituency but lost to INC candidate Rattan Singh. Along with Dalip Singh Tapiala and Harkishan Singh Surjeet, he was also a prominent figure in the Punjab Kisan movement and a leader of the Kisan Sabha. During the Indo-China War in 1962, he was again detained by the Congress government for over ten months, and during the inner struggle of the Communist Party, Bhag Singh sided with the Left Fraction, and during the 1964 split in the Communist Party of India, he became one of the 32 founding members of the Communist Party of India (Marxist) and became a member of the Central Control Commission, the party's highest decision-making body, along with Abdul Halim and C. Venkatraman.

== Death ==
After years of Prisons life and revolutionary struggle Dr. Bhag Singh's health was shattered which developed into serious Kidney trouble which eventually took his life on August 10, 1966.
