= Durgadas Bhatia =

20th-century Indian politician

Member of Parliament, Lok Sabha
- In office 1971–1972
- Preceded by: Yagya Dutt Sharma
- Succeeded by: Raghunandan Lal Bhatia
- Constituency: Amritsar, Punjab

Personal details
- Born: 29 August 1907 Lahore, Punjab, British India
- Died: 1972 (aged 64–65)
- Party: Indian National Congress
- Spouse: Padmavati Bhatia

Durgadas Bhatia (29 August 1907 – 1972) was an Indian politician belonging to the Indian National Congress. He was elected to the Lok Sabha, lower house of the Parliament of India from Amritsar in Punjab.
