= Amritsar East Assembly constituency =

Legislative Assembly constituency in Punjab State, India

Coordinates: 31.63°N 74.92°E

Amritsar East
- Constituency No. 18 for the Punjab Legislative Assembly

Constituency details
- Country: India
- State: Punjab
- District: Amritsar
- Lok Sabha constituency: Amritsar
- Established: First:1951; Seceond:2008
- Total electors: 168,300 (in 2022)
- Reservation: None

Member of Legislative Assembly
- 16th Punjab Legislative Assembly
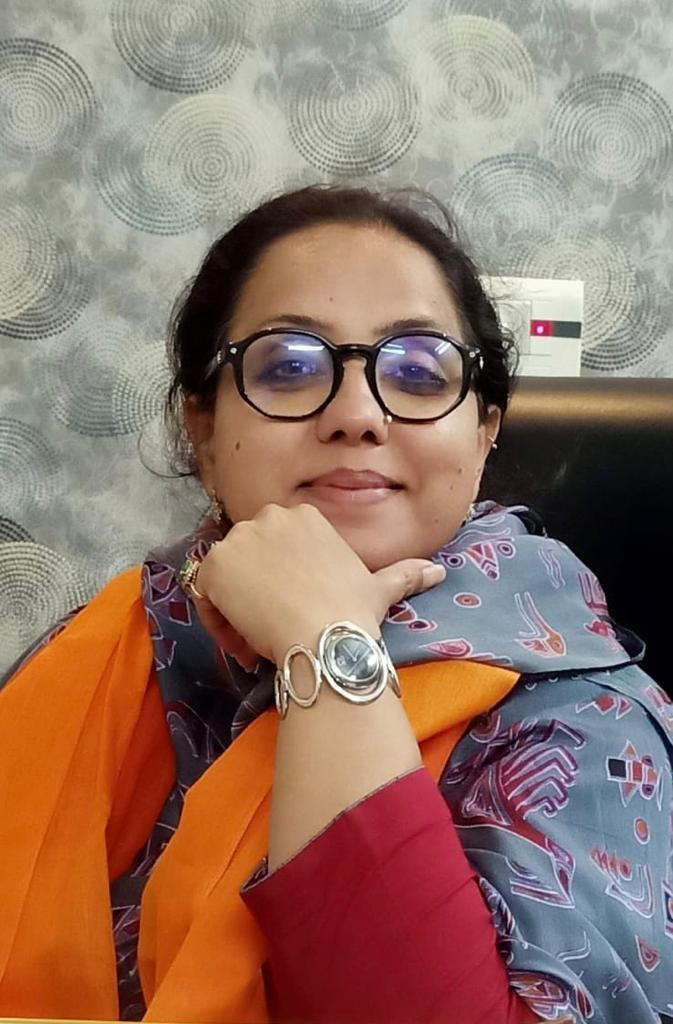
- Incumbent Jeevan Jyot Kaur
- Party: Aam Aadmi Party
- Elected year: 2022

Amritsar East Assembly constituency (Sl. No.: 18) is a Punjab Legislative Assembly constituency in Amritsar district, Punjab state, India.

== Members of Legislative Assembly ==
Most successful parties from Amritsar East Vidhan Sabha
1. BJS (3 Times) (33.3%)
2. INC (3 Times) (33.3%)
3. AAP (1 Time) (11.1%)
4. BJP (1 Time) (11.1%)
5. SAD (1 Time) (11.1%)

Year	Member	Party
Constituency name: Amritsar City East
1952	Sarup Singh	Shiromani Akali Dal
1957	Baldev Prakash	Bharatiya Jana Sangh
1962	Baldev Prakash	Bharatiya Jana Sangh
1967	Baldev Prakash	Bharatiya Jana Sangh
1969	Gian Chand Kharbanda	Indian National Congress
1972	Gian Chand Kharbanda	Indian National Congress
1977-2012 : Constituency defunct
2012	Navjot Kaur Sidhu	Bharatiya Janata Party
2017	Navjot Singh Sidhu	Indian National Congress
2022	Jeevan Jyot Kaur	Aam Aadmi Party

== Election results ==
=== 2027 ===
Punjab Assembly election, 2027: Amritsar East
Party	Candidate	Votes	%	±%
AAP				
AD (WPD)				New entry
INC				
BSP				
SAD				
BJP				
NOTA	None of the above			
Majority				
Turnout				

=== 2022 ===
2022 Punjab Legislative Assembly election: Amritsar East
Party	Candidate	Votes	%	±%
AAP	Jeevan Jyot Kaur	39,679	36.74	▲21.98
INC	Navjot Singh Sidhu	32,929	30.49	▼30.19
SAD	Bikram Singh Majithia	25,188	23.32	New
BJP	Jagmohan Singh Raju	7,286	6.75	▼10.98
NOTA	None of the above	690	0.64	
Majority		6,750	6.25	
Turnout		108,003	64.17	▼0.77
Registered electors		168,300		
AAP gain from INC		Swing	▲19.3	

=== 2017 result ===
2017 Punjab Legislative Assembly election: Amritsar East
Party	Candidate	Votes	%	±%
INC	Navjot Singh Sidhu	60,477	60.68	▲32.47
BJP	Rakesh Kumar Honey	17,668	17.73	▼18.57
AAP	Sarabjot Singh Dhanjal	14,715	14.76	New
IND.	Mandeep Singh Manna	1,863	1.87	New
CPI	Baldev Singh	1,586	1.59	
BSP	Tarsem Singh	1,237	1.24	
Majority		42,809	42.95	
Turnout		99,771	64.94	−1.22
Registered electors		153,629		
INC gain from BJP		Swing	+25.52	

=== 2012 result ===
2012 Punjab Legislative Assembly election: Amritsar East
Party	Candidate	Votes	%	±%
BJP	Navjot Kaur Sidhu	33,406	36.30	
IND.	Simarpreet Kaur	26,307	28.59	
INC	Sunil Dutti	25,964	28.21	
CPI	Baldev Singh	3,416	3.71	
BSP	Tarsem Singh	1,667	1.81	
Majority		7,099	7.71	
Turnout		92,054	66.18	New
Registered electors				
BJP win (new seat)				
