= Navjot Kaur Sidhu =

Indian politician (born 1963)

Member of the Punjab Legislative Assembly
- In office 6 March 2012 – 8 October 2016
- Preceded by: Gian Chand Kharbanda
- Succeeded by: Navjot Singh Sidhu
- Constituency: Amritsar East

Personal details
- Born: 15 June 1963 (age 63) Ludhiana, Punjab, India
- Party: Bharatiya Rashtrawadi Party
- Other political affiliations: Indian National Congress (2016–2025); Bharatiya Janata Party (till 2016)
- Spouse: Navjot Singh Sidhu
- Children: 2
- Occupation: Politician

Navjot Kaur Sidhu (born 15 June 1963) is an Indian politician and former member of Punjab Legislative Assembly. She was elected to assembly in 2012 from Amritsar East as a candidate of Bharatiya Janata Party.

She was appointed Chief Parliamentary Secretary. She is doctor by profession and served in Govt. Rajindra Hospital, Patiala before resigning in January 2012 to enter politics. She is married to former cricketer and INC leader Navjot Singh Sidhu. They have a son named Karan and daughter Rabia.

== Career ==
Kaur announced her resignation from the BJP on her Facebook page, before launching an attack on Chief Minister Parkash Singh Badal in another post. Navjot Kaur, who along with her husband, Navjot Singh Sidhu, had not been enjoying the best of relations with her party's Punjab unit as well as the SAD leadership, posted a message on 1 April 2016. It said, "Finally I have resigned from the BJP. The burden is over."

Navjot Kaur exposed a senior state government medical officer running a private hospital in Mohali through a sting operation. The then central Health Minister Ghulam Nabi Azad invited Sidhu, to become a member of the National PNDT Committee for reforms in the Health Department.

== Electoral performance ==
2012 Punjab Legislative Assembly election: Amritsar East
Party	Candidate	Votes	%	±%
BJP	Navjot Kaur Sidhu	33,406	36.30	
IND.	Simarpreet Kaur	26,307	28.59	
INC	Sunil Dutti	25,964	28.21	
CPI	Baldev Singh	3,416	3.71	
BSP	Tarsem Singh	1,667	1.81	
Majority		7,099	7.71	
Turnout		92,054	66.18	New
Registered electors				
BJP win (new seat)				
