= Gurjeet Singh Aujla =

Indian politician (born 1972)

- ਗੁਰਜੀਤ ਸਿੰਘ ਔਜਲਾ
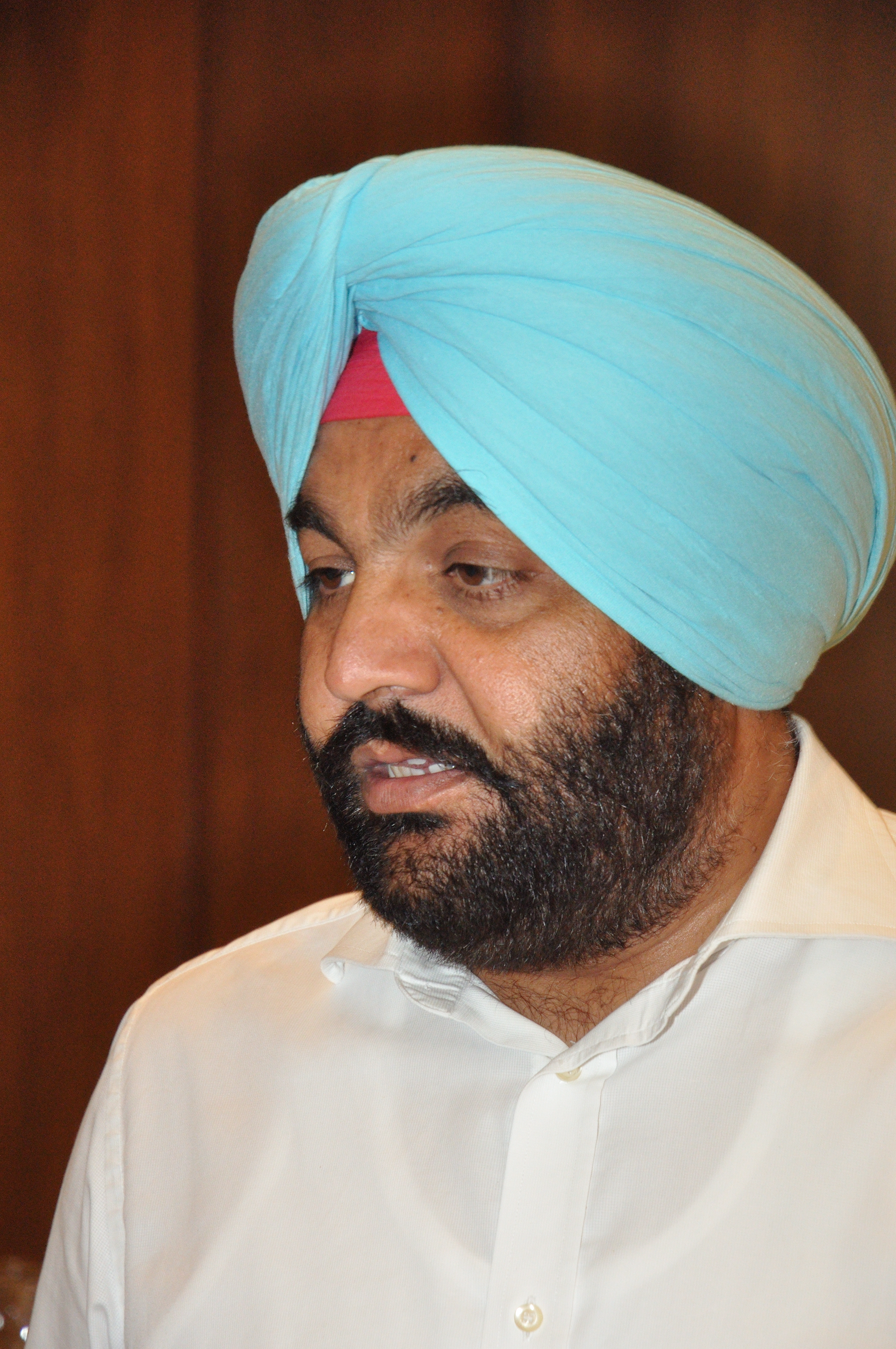

Member of Parliament, Lok Sabha
- Incumbent
- Assumed office 11 March 2017
- Preceded by: Captain Amarinder Singh
- Constituency: Amritsar

Personal details
- Born: 30 October 1972 (age 53) Amritsar, Punjab, India
- Party: Indian National Congress
- Education: Higher Secondary Educated at C.L.H. Sr. Secondary School, Amritsar, Punjab
- Profession: Agriculturist, Builder
- As of August, 2021 Source: []

Gurjeet Singh Aujla (born 30 October 1972) is an Indian politician and a member of Indian National Congress and current member of Parliament for Amritsar in Punjab, India.

== Political career ==
On 11 March 2017 he won the by-poll to the Lok Sabha seat which was necessitated due to the vacancy caused by the resignation of Captain Amarinder Singh in 2016. Gurjeet Singh Aujla defeated BJP nominee Rajinder Mohan Singh Chhina by a margin of 197,491 votes. AAP candidate Upkar Singh Sandhu secured 149,160 votes to finish third.

Gurjeet Singh Aujla once again won the Amritsar Lok Sabha seat in 2019 Indian general election defeating Union minister Hardeep Singh Puri. Aujla got 444,052 (51.78%) votes while Puri finished second with 344,049 (40.19%) votes.

In 2023, some criminals stormed the Parliament when he was inside. Him and security officers grabbed an object from one of the criminals. During an interview, he also told The Indian Express that: "A Punjabi never runs away from danger.

== Electoral performance ==
Bye-Election, 2017: Amritsar
Party	Candidate	Votes	%	±%
INC	Gurjeet Singh Aujla	508,153	50.09	▲2.15
BJP	Rajinder Mohan Singh Chhina	308,964	30.45	▼7.29
AAP	Upkar Singh Sandhu	149,984	14.78	▲6.58
CPI	Daswinder Kaur	17,886	1.76	▲0.48
None of the Above	None of the Above	9,747	0.96	▲0.71
Majority		199,189	19.64	▲9.44
Turnout		1,016,125	70.50	▲2.31
INC hold		Swing		

2019 Indian general elections: Amritsar
Party	Candidate	Votes	%	±%
INC	Gurjeet Singh Aujla	445,032	51.78	▲1.69
BJP	Hardeep Singh Puri	345,406	40.19	▲9.74
AAP	Kuldeep Singh Dhaliwal	20,087	2.34	▼12.44
CPI	Daswinder Kaur	16,335	1.90	▲0.14
NOTA	None of the Above	8,763	1.02	▲0.06
Majority		99,626	11.59	▼8.05
Turnout		860,582	57.07	▼13.32
INC hold		Swing		

2024 Indian general election: Amritsar
Party	Candidate	Votes	%	±%
INC	Gurjeet Singh Aujla	255,181	28.18	▼23.60
AAP	Kuldeep Singh Dhaliwal	214,880	23.73	▲21.39
BJP	Taranjit Singh Sandhu	207,205	22.88	▼17.31
SAD	Anil Joshi	162,896	17.99	New
SAD(A)	Emaan Singh Mann	26,796	2.96	New
NOTA	None of the Above	3,714	0.41	▼0.61
Majority		40,301	4.45	▼7.14
Turnout		905,656		
Registered electors		1,611,263		
INC hold		Swing	▼23.60	
