= Kunwar Vijay Pratap Singh =

Indian politician

Member of Punjab Legislative Assembly
- Incumbent
- Assumed office 10 March 2022
- Preceded by: Sunil Dutti
- Constituency: Amritsar North

Personal details
- Born: 6 September 1969 (age 57)
- Party: Bharatiya Janata Party (2026-present); Aam Aadmi Party (2022–2026)
- Education: Panjab University (LL.B.) IGNOU (MA); GNDU (PhD)

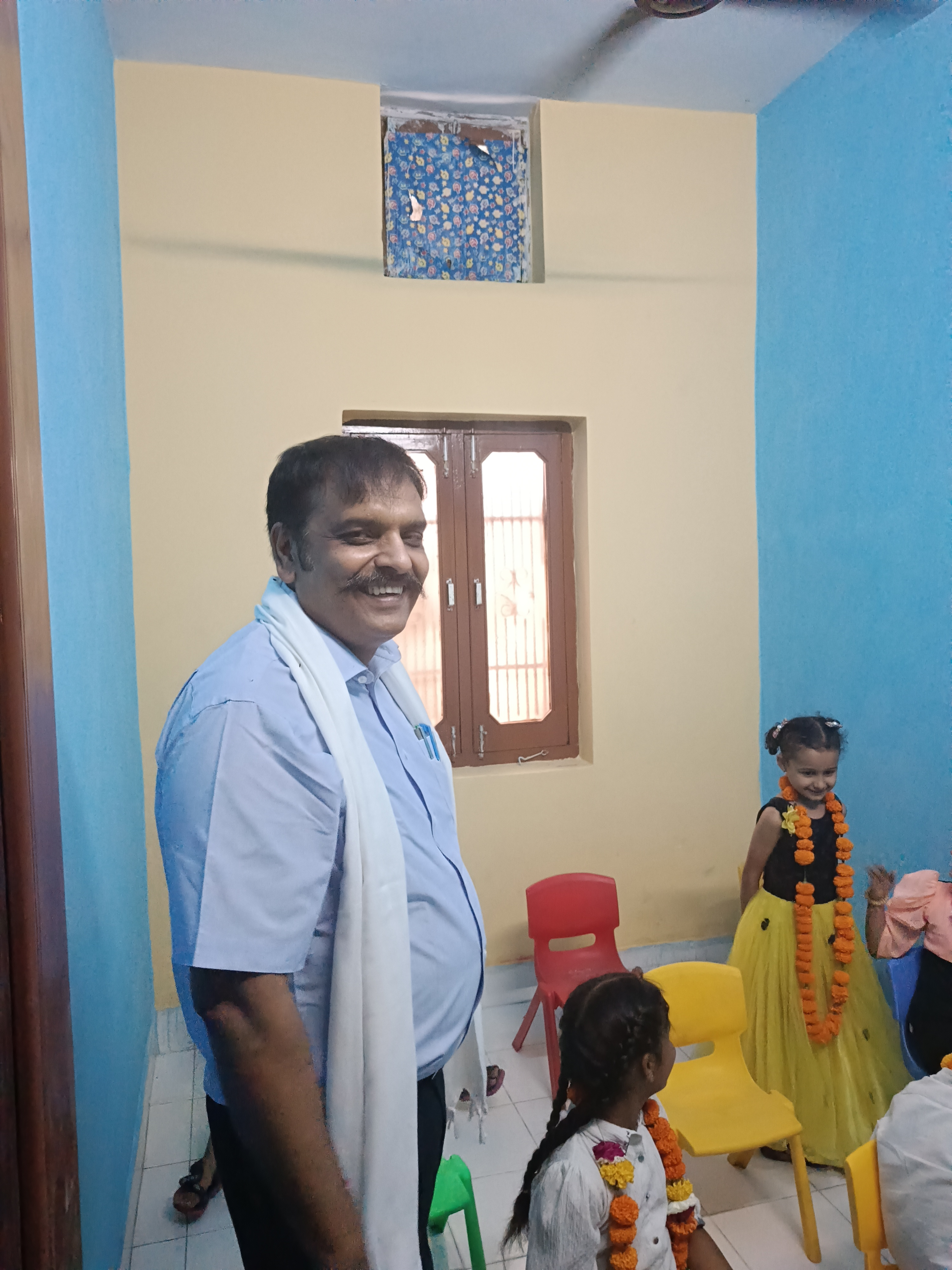
Kunwar Vijay Pratap Singh

Kunwar Vijay Pratap Singh is an Indian politician and the Member of the Legislative Assembly representing the Amritsar North Assembly constituency. He was a member of the Aam Aadmi Party until 2026.

== Member of Legislative Assembly ==
He represents the Amritsar North Assembly constituency as MLA in Punjab Assembly. The Aam Aadmi Party gained a strong 79% majority in the sixteenth Punjab Legislative Assembly by winning 92 out of 117 seats in the 2022 Punjab Legislative Assembly election. MP Bhagwant Mann was sworn in as Chief Minister on 16 March 2022.

Committee assignments of Punjab Legislative Assembly

- Chairman (2022–23) Committee on Government Assurances

== Assets and liabilities declared during elections ==
During the 2022 Punjab Legislative Assembly election, Pratap Singh declared Rs. 2,11,56,656 as an overall financial asset and Rs. 12,76,538 as financial liability.

== Electoral performance ==
Punjab Assembly election, 2022: Amritsar North
Party	Candidate	Votes	%	±%
AAP	Kunwar Vijay Pratap Singh	58,133	46.98	▲
SAD	Anil Joshi	29,815	24.09	▲
INC	Sunil Dutti	18,983	15.34	▼
BJP	Sukhwinder Singh Pintu	13,865	11.2	26.9 ▼
NOTA	None of the above	804	0.65	
Majority		28,318	22.89	
Turnout		123,752	61.15	
Registered electors		202,365		
AAP gain from INC		Swing		

== Personal life ==
Pratap Singh belongs to the Rajput family of Karasghat, Gopalganj, Bihar. His wife Madhumita died on 21 September 2024.

== Political career ==
Pratap Singh won Amritsar North Assembly constituency on the AAP ticket in 16th Punjab Legislative Assembly election in 2022. In June 2025, the AAP suspended him from party for five years due to anti-party activities. On 2 November 2026, Pratap Singh joined the Bharatiya Janata Party.

State Legislative Assembly
Preceded by Raj Kumar Verka (INC)	Member of the Punjab Legislative Assembly from Amritsar North Assembly constituency 2022 –	Incumbent
