= Sukhbinder Singh Sarkaria =

Indian politician

Member of Punjab Legislative Assembly
- Incumbent
- Assumed office 2007
- Preceded by: Vir Singh Lopoke
- Constituency: Raja Sansi

Revenue Minister, Punjab.

Rehabilitation & Disaster Management Minister, Punjab

Water Resources Minister, Punjab.

Personal details
- Party: Indian National Congress
- Other party: Shiromani Akali Dal

Sukhbinder Singh Sarkaria is an Indian politician from the Indian National Congress. He is a member of Punjab Legislative Assembly and represents Raja Sansi. He is a Punjab state cabinet minister holding the portfolios of the ministries of Revenue, Rehabilitation & Disaster Management and Water Resources.

== Early life ==
Sarkaria was born on 31 March 1956 in Amritsar to Narinder Singh Sarkaria and Amarjit Kaur.

== Assets and liabilities declared during elections ==
During the 2022 Punjab Legislative Assembly election, He declared Rs. 11,21,53,000 as an overall financial asset and Rs. 4,49,12,000 as financial liability.

== Political career ==
Sarkaria first contested the Punjab Legislative Assembly on Congress ticket from Raja Sansi in 1997 but was unsuccessful. He again contested from Raja Sansi in 2002 as an independent candidate, but narrowly lost the election. He also contested the 2004 Lok Sabha election from Tarn Taran constituency. However, he was successful during 2007 Vidhan Sabha elections, when he won from Raja Sansi with a big margin. He was re-elected MLA for Raja Sansi in 2012. He is elected MLA consecutively for the 3rd time in 2017 from Rajasansi constituency in the Punjab Legislative Assembly where he defeated Vir Singh Lopoke of the Shiromani Akali Dal. He was the Chairman of Punjab Mandi Board during Capt. Amrinder Singh's government.

He is also the Vice President of Punjab Pradesh Congress Committee.

Sarkaria was one of the 42 INC MLAs who submitted their resignations in protest of a decision of the Supreme Court of India ruling Punjab's termination of the Sutlej-Yamuna Link (SYL) water canal unconstitutional.

== MLA ==
The Aam Aadmi Party gained a strong 79% majority in the sixteenth Punjab Legislative Assembly by winning 92 out of 117 seats in the 2022 Punjab Legislative Assembly election. MP Bhagwant Mann was sworn in as Chief Minister on 16 March 2022.

Political offices
| Preceded by - | Punjab Cabinet minister for Minister of Water Resources; 2017–2022 | Succeeded by Brahm Shankar Jimpa |
State Legislative Assembly
| Preceded by Vir Singh Lopoke | Member of the Punjab Legislative Assembly from Raja Sansi Assembly constituency 2022 – | Incumbent |
