= Raja Sansi Assembly constituency =

Legislative Assembly constituency in Punjab State, India

Coordinates: 31.72°N 74.8°E

Raja Sansi
- Constituency No. 12 for the Punjab Legislative Assembly

Constituency details
- Country: India
- State: Punjab
- District: Amritsar
- Lok Sabha constituency: Amritsar
- Established: 1951
- Total electors: 177,713
- Reservation: None

Member of Legislative Assembly
- 16th Punjab Legislative Assembly
- Incumbent Sukhbinder Singh Sarkaria
- Party: Indian National Congress
- Elected year: 2022

Raja Sansi Assembly constituency (Sl. No.: 12) is a Punjab Legislative Assembly constituency that includes Rajasansi in Amritsar district, Punjab state, India.

== Members of the Legislative Assembly ==
Most successful parties from Raja Sansi Vidhan Sabha
1. INC (5 Times) (50.0%)
2. SAD (3 Times) (30.0%)
3. CPI (M) (1 Time) (10.0%)
4. INC (I) (1 Time) (10.0%)

Year	Member	Party
1977	Dalip Singh Tapiala	Communist Party of India (Marxist)
1980	Iqbal Singh	Indian National Congress (Indira)
1985	Shashpal Singh	Shiromani Akali Dal
1992	Parminder Singh	Indian National Congress
1997	Vir Singh Lopoke	Shiromani Akali Dal
2002	Vir Singh Lopoke	Shiromani Akali Dal
2007	Sukhbinder Singh Sarkaria	Indian National Congress
2012	Sukhbinder Singh Sarkaria	Indian National Congress
2017	Sukhbinder Singh Sarkaria	Indian National Congress
2022	Sukhbinder Singh Sarkaria	Indian National Congress

== Election results ==
=== 2027 ===
Punjab Assembly election, 2027: Raja Sansi
Party	Candidate	Votes	%	±%
AAP	Sonia Mann			
AD (WPD)				New entry
INC				
BSP				
SAD				
BJP				
NOTA	None of the above			
Majority				
Turnout				

=== 2022 ===
Punjab Assembly election, 2022: Raja Sansi
Party	Candidate	Votes	%	±%
INC	Sukhbinder Singh Sarkaria	46,872	35.08	
SAD	Veer Singh Lopoke	41,398	30.98	
AAP	Baldev Singh Meadian	37,426	28.01	
BJP	Mukhwinder Singh	2,409	1.8	
SSM	Satnam Singh Ajnala	1,527	1.14	
NOTA	None of the above	1,306	0.98	
Majority		5,474	4.1	
Turnout		133,615	74.7	
Registered electors		178,818		
INC hold				

=== 2017 ===
Punjab Assembly election, 2017: Raja Sansi
Party	Candidate	Votes	%	±%
INC	Sukhbinder Singh Sarkaria	59,628	45.20	
SAD	Vir Singh Lopoke	53,901	40.8	
AAP	Jagjot Singh Dhillon	13,213	10.08	
CPI(M)	Virsa Singh	1,040	0.79	
APP	Sardool Singh	824	0.63	
BSP	Lakhbir Singh	819	0.62	
NOTA	None of the above	917	0.5	
Majority		5,727	4.4	
Turnout		131,091	79.0	
Registered electors		167,203		

=== 2012 ===
2012 Punjab Legislative Assembly election: Raja Sansi
Party	Candidate	Votes	%	±%
INC	Sukhbinder Singh Sarkaria	62,085	48.63	
SAD	Vir Singh Lopoke	61,001	47.78	
Majority		1,084		
Turnout		127,671		
Registered electors		155,672		

== See also ==
- List of constituencies of the Punjab Legislative Assembly
- Amritsar district
