= Amritsar North Assembly constituency =

Legislative Assembly constituency in Punjab State, India

Coordinates: 31.66°N 74.87°E

Amritsar North
- Constituency No. 15 for the Punjab Legislative Assembly

Constituency details
- Country: India
- State: Punjab
- District: Amritsar
- Lok Sabha constituency: Amritsar
- Total electors: 202,095 (in 2022)
- Reservation: None

Member of Legislative Assembly
- 16th Punjab Legislative Assembly
- Incumbent Kunwar Vijay Pratap Singh
- Party: Aam Aadmi Party
- Elected year: 2022

Amritsar North Assembly constituency (Sl. No.: 15) is a Punjab Legislative Assembly constituency in Amritsar district, Punjab state, India. Its Member of Legislative Assembly is Kunwar Vijay Pratap Singh, Aam Aadmi Party.

== Members of the Legislative Assembly ==
Most successful parties from Amritsar North Vidhan Sabha
1. INC (6 Times) (50.0%)
2. BJP (3 Times) (25.0%)
3. AAP (1 Time) (8.33%)
4. JP (1 Time) (8.33%)
5. INC (I) (1 Time) (8.33%)

Year	Member	Party
1951	Satya Pal	Indian National Congress
1952^	Chandan Lal	Indian National Congress
1957-77 : Constituency defunct
1977	Harbans Lal Khanna	Janata Party
1980	Brij Bhushan Mehra	Indian National Congress (I)
1985	Brij Bhushan Mehra	Indian National Congress
1992	Faqir Chand Sharma	Indian National Congress
1997	Baldev Raj Chawla	Bharatiya Janata Party
2002	Jugal Kishore Sharma	Indian National Congress
2007	Anil Joshi	Bharatiya Janata Party
2012	Anil Joshi	Bharatiya Janata Party
2017	Sunil Dutti	Indian National Congress
2022	Kunwar Vijay Pratap Singh	Aam Aadmi Party

== Election results ==
=== 2027 ===
Punjab Assembly election, 2027: Amritsar North
Party	Candidate	Votes	%	±%
AAP	Karamjit Singh Rintu			
BJP	Kunwar Vijay Pratap Singh			
INC	Anil Joshi			
AD (WPD)				New entry
BSP				
SAD				
NOTA	None of the above			
Majority				
Turnout				

=== 2022 ===
Punjab Assembly election, 2022: Amritsar North
Party	Candidate	Votes	%	±%
AAP	Kunwar Vijay Pratap Singh	58,133	46.98	▲
SAD	Anil Joshi	29,815	24.09	▲
INC	Sunil Dutti	18,983	15.34	▼
BJP	Sukhwinder Singh Pintu	13,865	11.2	26.9 ▼
NOTA	None of the above	804	0.65	
Majority		28,318	22.89	
Turnout		123,752	61.15	
Registered electors		202,365		
AAP gain from INC		Swing		

=== 2017 ===
Punjab Assembly election, 2017: Amritsar North
Party	Candidate	Votes	%	±%
INC	Sunil Dutti	59,212	50.10	
BJP	Anil Joshi	44,976	38.10	
AAP	Manish Aggarwal	10,966	9.36	
NOTA	None of the above	972	0.6	
Majority		14,236	12.2	
Turnout		117,112	67.1	
Registered electors		175,908		
