= Yagya Dutt Sharma (Punjab politician) =

Indian politician

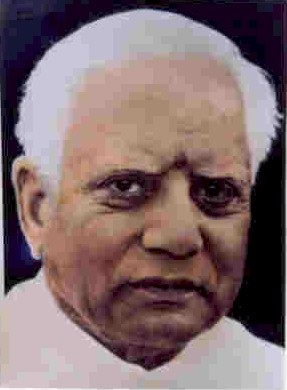

Governor of Odisha
- In office 7 February 1990 – 1 February 1993
- Preceded by: Saiyid Nurul Hasan
- Succeeded by: Saiyid Nurul Hasan

Member of Lok Sabha
- In office 1967–1971
- Preceded by: Gurmukh Singh Musafir
- Succeeded by: Durgadas Bhatia
- Constituency: Amritsar
- In office 1977–1980
- Preceded by: Prabodh Chandra
- Succeeded by: Sukhbans Kaur Bhinder
- Constituency: Gurdaspur

Personal details
- Born: 21 September 1922 Takhatgarh Village, Punjab, British India
- Died: 4 July 1996 (aged 73) New Delhi
- Spouse: Prakashwati Sharma
- Children: Prem Dutt Sharma; Aradhna Sharma
- Profession: Politician

Veer Yagya Dutt Sharma (21 October 1922 – 4 July 1996) (formerly known as Banarsi Dass Chandan) was an Indian politician. He was associated with RSS and was one of the founding members of Bhartiya Jan Sangh. He was a member of the fourth and sixth Lok Sabha representing the Amritsar and Gurdaspur parliamentary constituencies in Punjab during 1967–70 and 1977–79. He was also a leader of Bharatiya Janata Party. His memorable contribution in establishing Bhartiya Jan Sangh in the rural areas of hills of Punjab (Kangra Una Hamirpur & Shimla) which are presently the part of Himachal Pradesh deserves a special mention. He was the Governor of Odisha from 1990 to 1993.

An ayurvedic physician by profession, he worked to improve indigenous system of medicine and to promote the ayurvedic system of medicine. During the famines of 1943 in Bengal and Kangra-Kula valley in 1945–46, he along with a team of doctors from Punjab provided relief to the famine-stricken people.

He also worked for the relief and rehabilitation of refugees in 1947 and rendered medical assistance to the sick.

| Preceded by Saiyid Nurul Hasan | Governor of Odisha; Feb 1990– Feb 1993 | Succeeded by Saiyid Nurul Hasan |
