= Saiyid Nurul Hasan =

Indian politician (1921–1993)

Saiyid Nurul Hasan FRHistS, FRAS
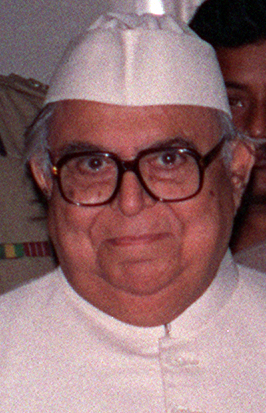

Union Minister of Education, Social Welfare, and Culture
- In office 24 March 1972 – 24 March 1977
- Prime Minister: Indira Gandhi
- Preceded by: Siddhartha Shankar Ray
- Succeeded by: Pratap Chandra Chunder

Indian Ambassador to the Soviet Union
- In office 1983–1986
- Prime Minister: Indira Gandhi; Rajiv Gandhi
- Preceded by: V.K. Ahuja
- Succeeded by: Triloki Nath Kaul

Governor of West Bengal
- In office 7 February 1990 – 12 July 1993
- Preceded by: T. V. Rajeswar
- Succeeded by: B. Satyanarayan Reddy
- In office 12 August 1986 – 20 March 1989
- Preceded by: Uma Shankar Dikshit
- Succeeded by: T. V. Rajeswar

Governor of Odisha
- In office 1 February 1993 – 31 May 1993
- Preceded by: Yagya Dutt Sharma
- Succeeded by: B. Satyanarayan Reddy
- In office 20 November 1988 – 6 February 1990
- Preceded by: Bishambhar Nath Pande
- Succeeded by: Yagya Dutt Sharma

Personal details
- Born: 26 December 1921 Lucknow, United Provinces, British India
- Died: 12 July 1993 (aged 71) Calcutta, West Bengal, India
- Spouse: Nawabzadi Khurshid Laqa Begum Sahiba
- Occupation: Historian, politician, diplomat

Saiyid Nurul Hasan FRHistS, FRAS (26 December 1921 – 12 July 1993) was an Indian historian and an elder statesman in the Government of India. A member of the Rajya Sabha, he was the Union Minister of State (with Independent Charges) of Education, Social Welfare and Culture Government of India (1971–1977) and the Governor of West Bengal and Odisha (1986–1993).

== Background and education ==
Nurul Hasan was born in Lucknow, India. He belonged to a taluqdari (madad-i ma'ash) family of the United Provinces. He was the son of Saiyid Abdul Hasan and Nur Fatima Begum, and his name was devised by combining the names of his parents. His father was a district settlement officer and later president of the Court of Wards in the United Provinces. His maternal grandfather was Sir Syed Wazir Hasan, chief justice of the Court of Oudh and a well known president of the Muslim League, who had called for Hindu-Muslim unity in 1936. His maternal uncles were Syed Sajjad Zaheer, a barrister and an eminent Marxist thinker and Syed Ali Zaheer, a barrister who became the law minister of Uttar Pradesh and India's ambassador to Iran.

Nurul Hasan attended the Sultan ul Madaris, Lucknow. Then he went to the La Martiniere Boys' College in Kolkata,. He completed his graduation from Muir Central College, Allahabad, where he was a student of Professor R.P. Tripathi. Later he went to New College, Oxford, where he completed an M.A. and D.Phil. in Indian history. In Oxford, he was president of the Oxford Majlis.

At a young age, Nurul Hasan was married to Nawabzadi Khurshid Laqa Begum Sahiba, eldest daughter of Nawab Raza Ali Khan of Rampur, in a match arranged by their families in the usual Indian way. At that time, Khurshid Laqa's father was the ruler of Rampur, a major, 15 Gun Salute Princely state located not far from Delhi, and surrounded by the United Provinces. The present Nawab, Kazim Ali Khan, is a nephew of Khurshid Laqa. Nurul Hasan and Khurshid Laqa had a harmonious marriage which lasted all their lives, and had two children, a son named Sayyid Sirajul Hasan, an eminent physicist who retired as director of the Indian Institute of Astrophysics, Bangalore, and a daughter, Sayyida Talat Fatima Hasan, who is a successful entrepreneur based in the USA.

== Career ==
=== Academic ===
He began his academic career as a lecturer in history at the School of Oriental and African Studies, London. He was appointed professor in the Department of History at Aligarh Muslim University, of which he was a chairperson as well. He contributed greatly to the growth of the history department in Aligarh in its initial years. Later he became the general secretary and then the president of the Indian History Congress. He was a Fellow of the Royal Historical Society and the Royal Asiatic Society in London.

=== Political ===
A secularist with an abiding faith in leftism, Nurul Hasan was a member of the Rajya Sabha from 1969 to 1978. From 1971 to 1977, he was the Union Minister of State (with independent charge) for Education, Social Welfare & Culture in the Government of India. As India's education minister, he founded the Indian Council of Historical Research, New Delhi. He was also the architect behind the setting up of 27 social science research institutes in India under the aegis of the Indian Council of Social Science Research (ICSSR), New Delhi, such as the Centre for Studies in Social Sciences, Calcutta (1973). When he was a minister, under an act of the parliament, the funding and management of the Rampur Raza Library was given to the Government of India. From 1977 to 1980 he was Vice President of the Council of Scientific and Industrial Research (CSIR), New Delhi.

He was instrumental in improving the career advancement scheme of many leftist college and university teachers in India, impacting the political neutrality of education. He was also instrumental in starting the 10+2+3 system of education at the High School, Junior College and undergraduate levels. He played a major role in tabling "Towards Equality: The Report of the Committee on the Status of Women in India (1974-5)" in parliament, which was submitted by a committee appointed by the Government of India. The findings of this report formed the basis for the establishment of the Centre for Women's Development Studies, Delhi. He served as Ambassador of India to the Soviet Union from 1983 to 1986. He was the Governor of West Bengal from 1986 to 1989 and then again from 1989 to 1993. He was the Governor of Odisha in 1989. As the Governor of West Bengal, he founded the Maulana Abul Kalam Azad Institute of Asian Studies, Calcutta (1993). He was the first President of the institute's Society.

== Death ==
He died of renal failure in Calcutta, West Bengal in 1993, aged 71, while continuing in office as the Governor.

== Legacy ==
Prof. Syed Nurul Hasan College, Farakka is named after him. The Nurul Hasan Education Foundation is named after him. The Nurul Hasan Chair Professorship of the Department of History of the University of Calcutta is named after him.

== Publications ==
- Religion, State, and Society in Medieval India : Collected Works of S. Nurul Hasan (Satish Chandra, editor). New Delhi : Oxford University Press, 2005. - viii, 335 S. : Kt. ISBN 0-19-566765-4 / 978-019566765-3
- Sufis, Sultans and Feudal Orders : Professor Nurul Hasan Commemoration Volume (Mansura Haidar, editor), 2004.
- Studies in archaeology and history: commemoration volume of Prof. S. Nurul Hasan, Publisher: Rampur Raza Library, 2003. ISBN 81-87113-57-X.

== See also ==
•Prof Syed Nurul Hasan College

Political offices
Preceded by Siddhartha Shankar Ray	Union Minister of Education, Social Welfare and Culture; 1972–1977	Succeeded by Pratap Chandra Chunder
Preceded by V.K. Ahuja	Ambassador to the Soviet Union; 1983–1986	Succeeded by T.N. Kaul
Preceded by Uma Shankar Dikshit (first term); T.V. Rajeswar (second term)	Governor of West Bengal; 1986–1989 (first term); 1990–1993 (second term)	Succeeded by T.V. Rajeswar (first term); B. Satya Narayan Reddy (second term)
Preceded by Bishambhar Nath Pande (first term); Yagya Dutt Sharma (second term)	Governor of Odisha; 1988–1990 (first term); February 1993 – May 1993 (second term)	Succeeded by Yagya Dutt Sharma (first term); B. Satya Narayan Reddy (second term)
