= Rajasansi =

- Town
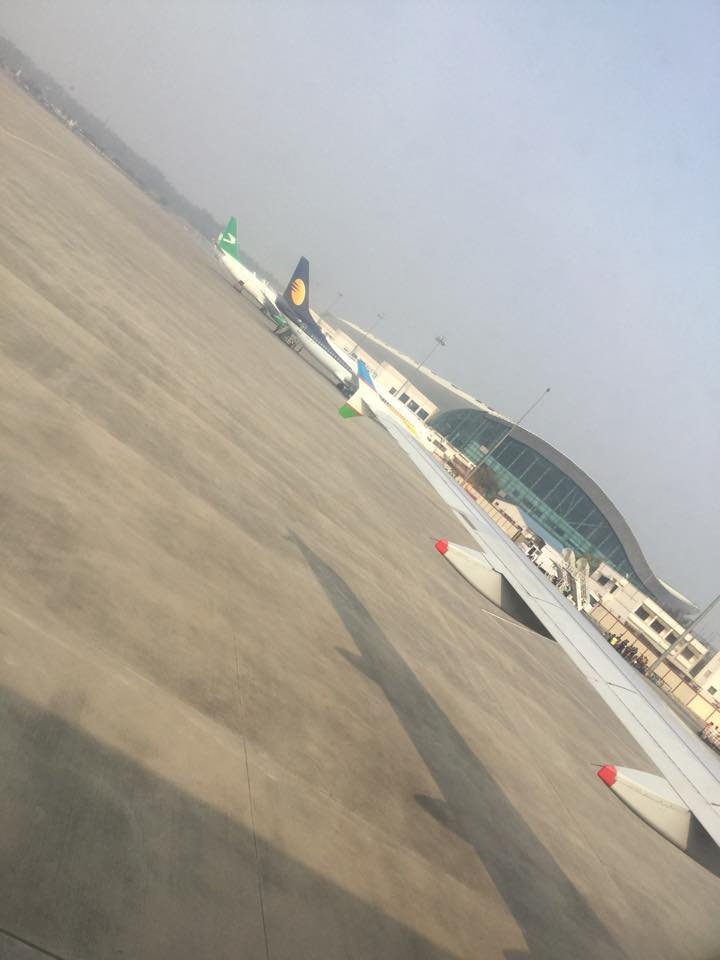
- Amritsar International Airport in Rajasansi, Amritsar (Punjab)

- Location in Punjab, India Rajasansi (India)
- Coordinates: 31.7245°N 74.786°E
- Country: India
- State: Punjab
- District: Amritsar

Population (2001)
  - Total: 12,131

Languages
  - Official: Punjabi
- Time zone: UTC+5:30 (IST)
- Postal code: 143101

Rajasansi is a town, near Amritsar city and a nagar panchayat in Amritsar district in the Indian state of Punjab. Sri Guru Ram Dass Jee International Airport (Amritsar International Airport) is located in Rajasansi village on Ajnala-Rajasansi Road. Raja Sansi Assembly Constituency is also an assembly segment in the Punjab Legislative Assembly, which is currently represented by Sukhbinder Singh Sarkaria.

== Demographics ==
Religion in Rajasansi
Religion	Percent
Sikhism	71.16%
Hinduism	20.04%
Christianity	7.99%
Islam	0.61%
Others	0.19%

As of 2001 India census, Rajasansi had a population of 12,131. Males constitute 54% of the population and females 46%. In Rajasansi, 13% of the population is under 6 years of age.

The table below shows the population of different religious groups in Raja Sansi city and their gender ratio, as of the 2011 census.

Population by religious groups in Raja Sansi city, 2011 census
Religion	Total	Female	Male	Gender ratio
Sikh	10,175	4,754	5,421	876
Hindu	2,866	1,305	1,561	836
Christian	1,143	589	554	1063
Muslim	87	35	52	673
Buddhist	4	1	3	333
Jain	4	2	2	1000
Not stated	19	9	10	900
Total	14,298	6,695	7,603	880

== Climate ==
Rajasansi has a semiarid climate, typical of Northwestern India and experiences four seasons primarily: winter season (December to March, when temperatures can drop to −1 °C (30 °F), summer season (April to June) where temperatures can reach 45 °C (113 °F), monsoon season (July to September) and post-monsoon season (October to November). Annual rainfall is about 703.4 millimetres (27.7 in). The lowest recorded temperature is −3.6 °C (25.5 °F), recorded on 9 December 1996 and the highest temperature, 47.8 °C (118.0 °F), was recorded on 9 June 1995. The official weather station for the village is the Civil Aerodrome. Weather records here date back to 15 November 1947.

Climate data for Rajasansi(1981-2010 normals, extremes 1947-present; humidity and sunshine 1961-1990)
Month	Jan	Feb	Mar	Apr	May	Jun	Jul	Aug	Sep	Oct	Nov	Dec	Year
Record high °C (°F)	26.8 (80.2)	32.2 (90.0)	36.2 (97.2)	44.1 (111.4)	47.7 (117.9)	47.8 (118.0)	45.6 (114.1)	40.7 (105.3)	40.6 (105.1)	38.3 (100.9)	34.2 (93.6)	28.5 (83.3)	47.8 (118.0)
Mean maximum °C (°F)	23 (73)	26.1 (79.0)	32 (90)	40.5 (104.9)	44 (111)	44.1 (111.4)	39.8 (103.6)	37.1 (98.8)	36.8 (98.2)	35.5 (95.9)	30.5 (86.9)	24.9 (76.8)	45.2 (113.4)
Mean daily maximum °C (°F)	18.4 (65.1)	21.7 (71.1)	26.8 (80.2)	34.2 (93.6)	39 (102)	39 (102)	35 (95)	34.2 (93.6)	34.1 (93.4)	32 (90)	27.1 (80.8)	21.1 (70.0)	30.2 (86.4)
Mean daily minimum °C (°F)	3.4 (38.1)	6.3 (43.3)	10.9 (51.6)	16.1 (61.0)	21.3 (70.3)	24.3 (75.7)	25.3 (77.5)	24.9 (76.8)	22.1 (71.8)	15.4 (59.7)	8.7 (47.7)	4.1 (39.4)	15.2 (59.4)
Mean minimum °C (°F)	−0.5 (31.1)	1.7 (35.1)	5.6 (42.1)	10.2 (50.4)	15.8 (60.4)	19.6 (67.3)	21.7 (71.1)	21.4 (70.5)	17.8 (64.0)	10.7 (51.3)	4.2 (39.6)	0.1 (32.2)	−1.2 (29.8)
Record low °C (°F)	−2.9 (26.8)	−2.6 (27.3)	2 (36)	6.4 (43.5)	9.6 (49.3)	15.6 (60.1)	18.2 (64.8)	18.8 (65.8)	13 (55)	7.3 (45.1)	−0.6 (30.9)	−3.6 (25.5)	−3.6 (25.5)
Average rainfall mm (inches)	26.2 (1.03)	38.6 (1.52)	38.4 (1.51)	21.4 (0.84)	26.7 (1.05)	61.2 (2.41)	210.1 (8.27)	167.3 (6.59)	77.5 (3.05)	16.1 (0.63)	6.3 (0.25)	13.6 (0.54)	703.4 (27.69)
Average rainy days (≥ 1.0 mm)	2.1	3.3	3.2	2	2.4	3.8	8.6	6.9	3.5	1.1	0.6	1.4	38.9
Average relative humidity (%)	74	70	64	47	38	48	72	77	69	67	73	76	65
Mean monthly sunshine hours	181.7	192.7	219.4	265.0	294.7	269.0	215.5	227.7	240.8	253.2	220.1	182.2	2,762

== Politics ==
The city is part of the Raja Sansi Assembly Constituency.

== Gallery ==
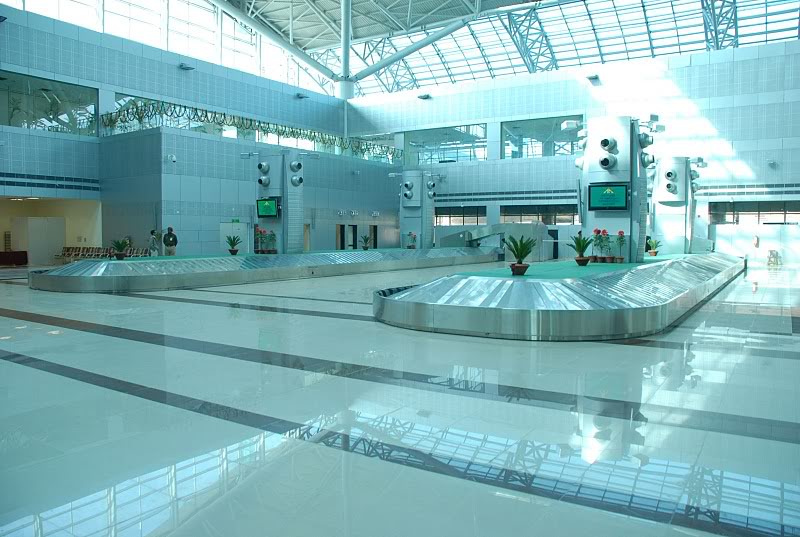
Rajasansi International Airport

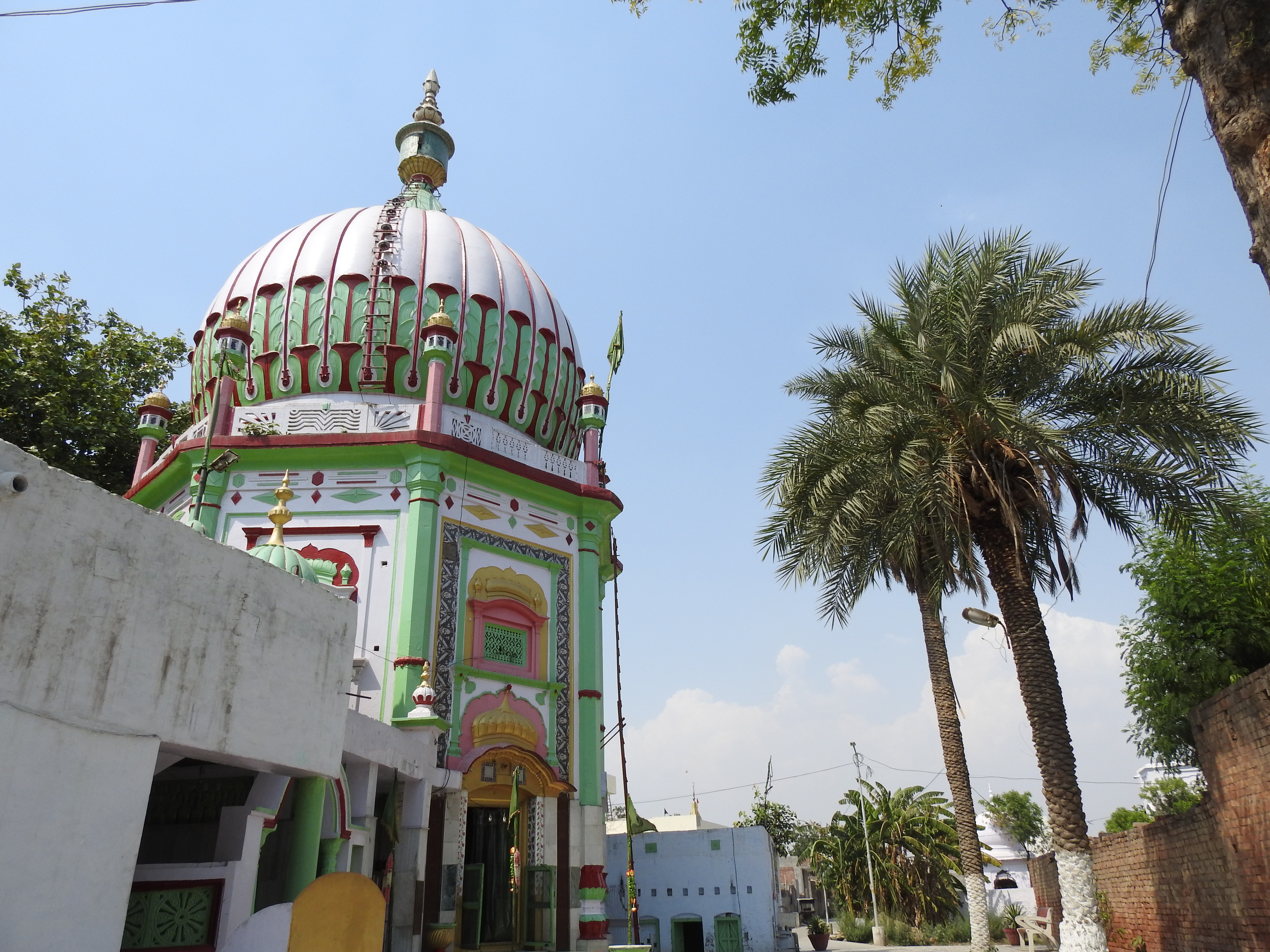
Dargah Baba Hussain Shah Kadri

== See also ==
- Misl
