= Lakshmi Puri =

Indian diplomat (born 1952)

Lakshmi Murudeshwar Puri
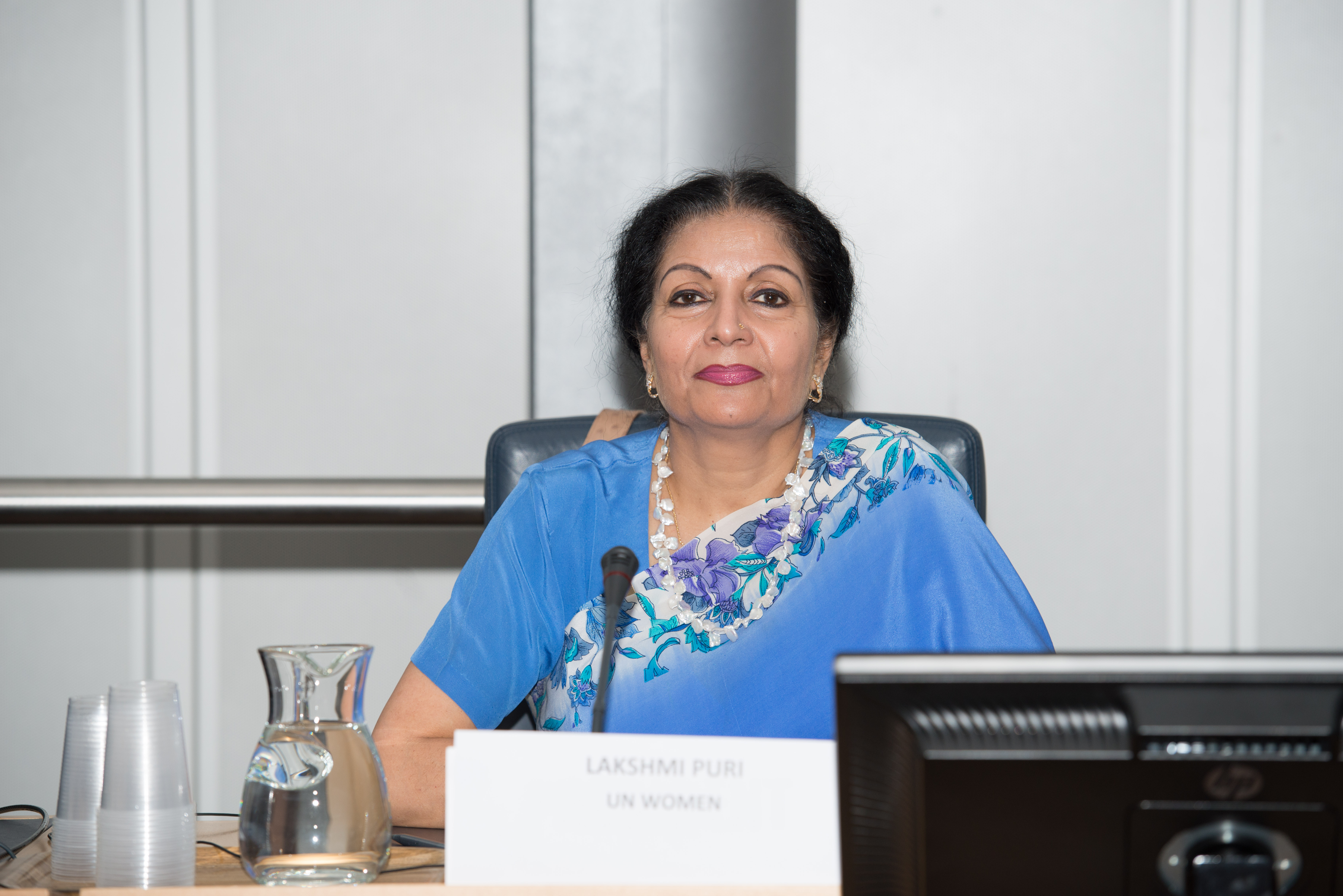
- Lakshmi Puri in 2014.
- Born: 1952 (age 73–74); Murdeshwara, Karnataka, India
- Education: B.A. (in History), University of Delhi; M.A., Panjab University at Chandigarh
- Occupations: Former Assistant Secretary-General of the United Nations and Deputy Executive Director of UN Women; Former Ambassador of India
- Years active: 1974—2020
- Spouse: Hardeep Singh Puri

Lakshmi Murdeshwar Puri (born 1952) is a former assistant secretary-general at the United Nations and the former deputy executive director of UN Women. Prior to her 15-year stint at the United Nations, she served as an Indian diplomat for 28 years. From 1999 until 2002, she was India's Ambassador to Hungary, while also concurrently accredited to Bosnia and Herzegovina.

== Early years and education ==
Puri was born Lakshmi Murdeshwar into a family hailing from the town of Murdeshwar in coastal Karnataka. Her father, Balakrishna Murdeshwar, was a Kannada litterateur and academician; her mother, Malathi, was from a Marathi-speaking family. Malathi was, according to Puri's own account, a "fierce feminist", who married outside her community against the strong prevailing tradition, and according to her own wishes. She was amongst the first postgraduates in Maharashtra. Puri credits both parents with inculcating her with ideals of gender equality and freedom of expression.

Puri studied for her Bachelor of Arts (Hons) degree in history at the University of Delhi, and her Master's degree at Panjab University. She also holds professional diplomas in history, public policy and administration, international relations and law, and economic development.

== Career ==
=== Civil Service ===
Ambassador Puri joined the Indian Foreign Service in 1974 and served in Japan, Sri Lanka, and Switzerland (in Geneva). She was appointed ambassador to Hungary in March 1999 and served there until July 2002, while also accredited to Bosnia and Herzegovina. During her term there, she worked closely with the UN peacekeeping operation in Bosnia and Herzegovina (UNPROFOR). At the Ministry of External Affairs headquarters in Delhi, she served as the undersecretary on the Japan and Korea desk and later as undersecretary on the Pakistan desk. She also served as the Joint-Secretary Economic Division and Multilateral Economic Relations (ED & MER) for six years. She was active in negotiating India's many bilateral, plurilateral and multilateral economic diplomacy initiatives such as the Look East policy, Indo-ASEAN Dialogue Partnership, Indian-Ocean Rim Association, Bay of Bengal Initiative for Multi-Sectoral Technical and Economic Cooperation as well as for the Group of 15 forum.

=== United Nations ===
==== UNCTAD ====
Puri continued with her trade and economic policy work when she joined the United Nations in 2002 as the director of United Nations Conference on Trade and Development's (UNCTAD) flagship Division on Trade in goods, services and commodities. She was the acting Deputy Secretary-General of UNCTAD from 2007 to 2009. From 2009 to 2011, she was director of the United Nations Office of the High Representative for the Least Developed Countries, Landlocked Developing Countries and Small Island Developing States (UN-ORLLS) in New York.

==== UN Women ====
Puri was appointed assistant secretary-general of the United Nations and deputy executive director of the pioneering global entity for promoting gender equality and the empowerment of women, UN Women in 2011.

== Recognition and awards ==
Puri was the recipient of the Eleanor Roosevelt Award for Human Rights in 2016, the Novus Award for Championing the Sustainable Development Goals (Novus Summit), and the Millennium Campus Award 2015. In 2017, for her role in ensuring that a specific gender equality and women's empowerment goal was adopted as part of the Sustainable Development Goals, Puri was recognized for her advocacy and leadership with the inaugural Diwali Power of One award from the Diwali Foundation USA, (in partnership with the Permanent Missions of India, Belarus, and Georgia to the United Nations).

== Personal life and family ==
Puri is married to Hardeep Singh Puri, who is an Indian politician and former diplomat. He currently serves as a cabinet minister in the Government of India. His appointment as Minister of Petroleum and Natural Gas began in July 2021, and as Minister of Housing and Urban Affairs in September 2017. They have two daughters. Puri has one older sister, Indira Bhargava, a former Indian Civil Servant and a former chairperson of the Central Board of Direct Taxes, whom she credits as a major influence in her life.

== Selected works ==
Puri is a published author of several reports and research papers:

- Edited:
  - Driving the Gender-Responsive Implementation of the 2030 Agenda for Sustainable Development, New York: UN Women, August 2016. PDF download
  - De Lombaerde, Philippe; [co-editor], eds. (April 2009). Aid for trade: Global and regional perspectives – Second world report on regional integration. United Nations University Series on Regionalism. Dordrecht; New York: Springer. ISBN 978-1402094545. PDF link
  - Addressing the Global Energy Crisis. UNCTAD publication (editor), December 2008.
  - Interface between Trade & Climate Change. UNCTAD publication (editor), November 2007.
- Authored:
  - Mashayekhi, Mina; Puri, Lakshmi; Ito, Taisuke (2005). "Chapter 1: Multilateralism and Regionalism: The New Interface". In Mashayekhi, Mina; Ito, Taisuke (eds.). Multilateralism and Regionalism: The New Interface (PDF). Geneva: UNCTAD. pp. 1–22. Archived from the original on 19 December 2022.
  - "Towards a new trade 'Marshall Plan' for least developed countries: How to Deliver on the Doha Development Promise and Help Realize the UN Millennium Development Goals" (PDF). UNCTAD Trade, Poverty and Cross-Cutting Development Issues Study Series (1). Geneva: UNCTAD Division on International Trade in Goods and Services and Commodities, Trade Analysis Branch. 2005. ISSN 1815-7742. Archived from the original on 6 October 2022.
  - Multilateralism and South-South Cooperation. UNCTAD publication (co-author), September 2004.
  - Trade and Development Review 2003. UNCTAD publication (author introduction), April 2004.

== See also ==
Civil Services of India
