= Sunil Dutti =

Indian politician

Punjab Legislative Assembly
- In office 2017–2022
- Preceded by: Anil Joshi
- Succeeded by: Kunwar Vijay Pratap Singh
- Constituency: Amritsar North Assembly constituency

Personal details
- Born: 4 July 1960 (age 65)
- Party: Indian National Congress
- Profession: Politician

Sunil Dutti (born 4 July 1960) is an Indian politician and a member of Indian National Congress. In 2017, he was elected as the member of the Punjab Legislative Assembly from Amritsar North Assembly constituency.

== Political career ==
Dutti is from the Indian National Congress.

In 2017 Punjab Legislative Assembly election, Dutti won the Amritsar North Assembly constituency on an Indian National Congress ticket, Dutti beat the member of the Punjab Legislative Assembly Anil Joshi of the Bharatiya Janata Party by over 14236 votes. After election he served as the MLA of Amritsar North Assembly constituency.

He contested the Punjab Assembly election, 2022 for a re-election from Amritsar North. He was defeated by the Aam Aadmi Party candidate Kunwar Vijay Pratap Singh.

== Member of Legislative Assembly ==
Dutti represented the Amritsar North Assembly constituency between 2017-2022.

== Electoral performance ==
Punjab Assembly election, 2022: Amritsar North
| Party | Candidate | Votes | % | ±% |
|---|---|---|---|---|
| AAP | Kunwar Vijay Pratap Singh | 58,133 | 46.98 | ▲ |
| SAD | Anil Joshi | 29,815 | 24.09 | ▲ |
| INC | Sunil Dutti | 18,983 | 15.34 | ▼ |
| BJP | Sukhwinder Singh Pintu | 13,865 | 11.2 | 26.9 ▼ |
| NOTA | None of the above | 804 | 0.65 | |
| Majority | | 28,318 | 22.89 | |
| Turnout | | 123,752 | 61.15 | |
| Registered electors | | 202,365 | | |
| AAP gain from INC | | Swing | | |
