= Rajan Bala =

Indian cricket columnist

Rajan Bala

Rajan Bala (1945 or 1946 – 9 October 2009), who used a shortened form of his full name Natarajan Balasubramaniam, was a noted Indian columnist on cricket.

Best known as someone who toured with every Indian cricket team from 1968 to 2003, Rajan Bala was technically accomplished in cricket techniques even though he was a journalist. In 1997 Sachin Tendulkar, who was having some problems with his technique, approached him for advice.

Rajan was not afraid to back a player who he felt had potential. A graduate of the London School of Economics, he decided to trust his heart and involve himself in cricket. Rajan earned the respect of many all-time great cricketers including Tiger Pataudi. He also wrote many books on cricket, including biographies of Tendulkar and Bhagwat Chandrasekhar.

Rajan died in Bangalore on 9 October 2009 due to kidney failure. His last book, a memoir titled Days Well Spent, was released a month later. He was 63 years old, and was survived by his wife and two sons.

== Books ==
- Kiwis and Kangaroos, India, 1969 (1970)
- All the Beautiful Boys (1990)
- The Winning Hand: Biography of B. S. Chandrasekhar (1993)
- The Phenomenon: Sachin Tendulkar (1999)
- Glances at Perfection: The Story of Indian Cricket Technique (2002)
- The Covers Are Off: A Socio-Historical Study of Indian Cricket (2004)
- Days Well Spent: A Cricketing Odyssey (2009)
