= Butala =

Butala is a surname. Notable people with the surname include:

- Jenna Butala (born 1971), American actress
- Sharon Butala (born 1940), Canadian writer and novelist
- Tony Butala (born 1940), American singer

== See also ==
- Buttala, Sri Lankan city
- Butala, Historical village near Baba Bakala, Punjab, India
