= Integrated framing assembly =

An integrated framing assembly (IFA) is a specialty product in insulating concrete form (ICF) construction. First developed in 2006 by Stala Integrated Assemblies, LLC, and thus also known colloquially as "Stala frames," these assemblies were designed for large commercial ICF construction.

IFAs’ innovative nature has been recognized by publications in the concrete construction industry, wall and ceiling industry, door and hardware industry, ICF industry, and architecture industry (both in the United States and Canada). In 2012, Stala Integrated Assemblies obtained a United States patent for integrated framing assemblies.

== IFA and ICF construction ==
As a poured concrete construction method, ICFs have become popular due to ICF buildings’ energy efficiency and structural stability. Their primary market has been residential homes, with a popular-level introduction to ICFs even appearing in 2007. Commercial ICF construction has grown considerably, however, and brought with it problems specific to large projects.

== IFA and the door and window problem ==
IFAs address a problem for large commercial ICF construction—door and window openings. Under previous construction methods, contractors used wood, vinyl, or light-weight steel to block out door and window openings while pouring the concrete. On residential projects, with only around 10 to 20 openings, this method sufficed. On larger construction projects, however, these methods of blocking out the openings meet problems:

- some architects do not like to use organic materials such as wood in commercial construction,
- concrete often shifts while consolidating, and so the dimensions of each opening must be rechecked,
- the door or window frame still needed to be installed once the opening was judged plumb and true,
- on commercial projects such as schools, hospitals, prisons, or barracks with hundreds of door and window openings, the work demanded for each of these processes at each opening has a serious effect on time and labor consumption. (See, for example, the breakdown of Joseph Warren Middle and High School, with almost 500 IFAs.)

== IFA design ==
Engineers and construction industry professionals designed IFAs for large commercial projects in order to solve this door and window problem. As 14-gage galvanized hollow metal frames, IFAs are installed prior to the pouring of the concrete, are capable of being anchored into the footer, and function as the method of blocking out the opening and the frame that under previous methods would be installed later. Thus, not only do they keep the opening's dimensions firm during concrete consolidation, they are immediately ready to receive doors and windows. Door assemblies even come with hardware preps, and most IFAs come with drywall returns for the interior side of the assembly.

Several other elements of IFAs reflect their design for the large commercial ICF construction market. IFAs can meet architectural designs that include sidelights, mullions, view windows, radius frames, etc. IFAs can be used on external walls as well as internal load-bearing walls. IFAs have an optional thermal break for cold- and hot-weather climates. IFAs can meet fire code requirements for doors in, for example, stairwells in commercial buildings.

== IFA jobsites ==
Since their appearance on their first job site in Kentucky in 2006, IFAs have been used on or are specified for job sites ranging from Scarborough, ME (Walgreens), Burleson, Texas (Burleson Independent School District), and Oahu, Hawaii (Schofield Barracks). Particularly innovative IFA projects are South Warren Middle and High School (Bowling Green, Kentucky, USA), the largest ICF building in North America upon completion, at two stories at 330,000 sq. ft., and Turkey Foot Middle School (Kenton Co., Kentucky, USA), the first job site to use IFAs with the thermal-break design, and Overdale Elementary School (Hillview, Kentucky, USA), where architects adapted the IFA design for mechanical chases.
