= Jeevan Jyot Kaur =

Indian politician

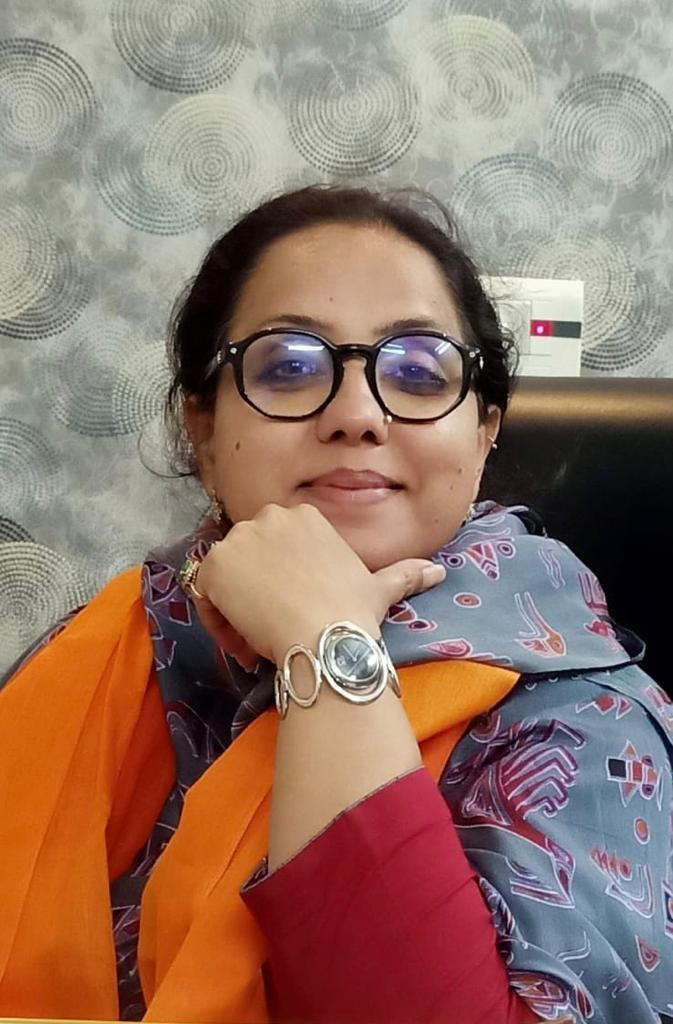

Member of Legislative Assembly, Punjab
- Incumbent
- Assumed office 10 March 2022
- Preceded by: Navjot Singh Sidhu
- Constituency: Amritsar East

Personal details
- Party: Aam Aadmi Party
- Occupation: Politician

Jeevan Jyot Kaur is an Indian politician and the MLA from Amritsar East Assembly constituency. She is a member of the Aam Aadmi Party. She defeated Navjot Singh Sidhu in the 2022 Punjab Legislative Assembly election.

== Political career ==
In 2022, Jyot contested from Aam Aadmi Party and won Punjab Legislative Assembly election from Amritsar East Assembly constituency. She defeated the incumbent MLA Navjot Singh Sidhu of Indian National Congress and Bikram Singh Majithia of Shiromani Akali Dal. She received 36.74% of the votes and won with a margin of 6.25% from the runner up Navjot Singh Sidhu. The Aam Aadmi Party gained a strong 79% majority in the sixteenth Punjab Legislative Assembly by winning 92 out of 117 seats in the 2022 Punjab Legislative Assembly election. MP Bhagwant Mann was sworn in as Chief Minister on 16 March 2022.

- Member (2022–23) Committee on Public Accounts
- Member (2022–23) Committee on Local Bodies

== Assets and liabilities declared during elections ==
During the 2022 Punjab Legislative Assembly election, she declared Rs. 4,27,67,365 as an overall financial asset and Rs. 41,80,346 as financial liability.

== Electoral performance ==
State Legislative Assembly
Preceded by Navjot Singh Sidhu (INC)	Member of the Punjab Legislative Assembly from Amritsar East Assembly constituency 2022 –	Incumbent
