= Dalip Singh Tapiala =

Indian revolutionary

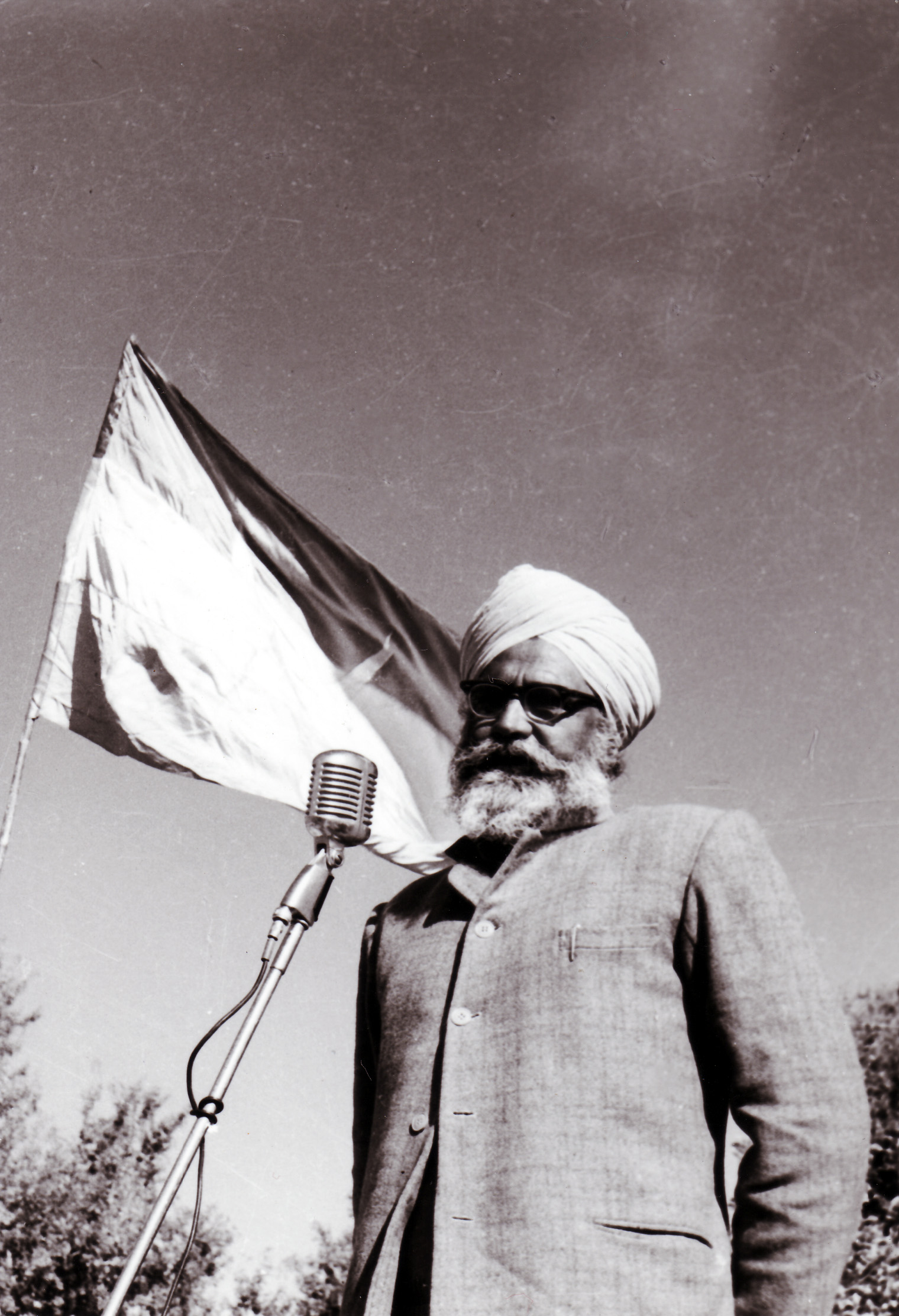
- Dalip Singh Tapiala in 1968

Member of the Punjab Legislative Assembly
- In office 1977–1980
- Preceded by: Constituency established
- Succeeded by: Iqbal Singh
- Constituency: Raja Sansi

Personal details
- Party: Communist Party of India (Marxist)(1964–till death); Communist Party of India (Until 1964)

Dalip Singh Tapiala, (also known as D. S. Tapiala), was an Indian revolutionary, Communist activist and firebrand Kisan Sabha leader from Punjab. Tapiala was one of the founding members of the Communist Party of India (Marxist) and later became a prominent fighter of the CPI(M) in Punjab as well as in India.

== Communnist Movement ==
Dalip Singh Tapiala was very much active in the Indian freedom struggle and was arrested in the Meerut Conspiracy Case. After independence in 1947, he joined the Communist Party of India and became an All India Kisan Sabha leader, and in the 15th conference of the All India Kisan Sabha held in Bangaon of North 24 Parganas district, West Bengal, India, Tapiala was elected as the member of the Central Kisan Council, the highest decision-making body of the All India Kisan Sabha. In 1964 Tapiala became one of the founding members of the Communist Party of India (Marxist) and eventually left the All India Kisan Sabha of the CPI and also became a founding member of the All India Kisan Sabha of the CPI(M).

== Political ==
Dalip Singh Tapiala was twice elected to the Punjab Legislative Assembly.
