= Indo-GDR Friendship Association =

Indo-GDR Friendship Association was an organisation based in India, working for strengthening relations between India and the German Democratic Republic. It appears to have been supported or led by members of the then ruling Congress party in India, particularly during its Leftist phase, under part of the leadership of Indira Gandhi. Active among its members were some prominent leaders of the then ruling Congress in India, and possibly other left leaning politicians as well.

== Branches, journal ==
The Indo-GDR Friendship Association or Society had branches in Delhi (1966), Nellore (1963), and it had a journal called Recognition, published around 1969 and thereabouts.

== Books published ==
Books such as 20 Years of India-GDR Relations: An Anthology were published by the All India Indo-GDR Friendship Association in 1974.

== Tours to the GDR ==
Writing in Women on the March, published for the women's front of the All India Congress Committee Ahalya Gagoi writes that in 1975 a "delegation of All India Indo-GDR Friendship Association, consisting of educationists, lawyers and trade unionists visited the German Democratic Republic" and her "subject of special study was the Socialist System of Education in [the] GDR". Their 19-day visit through the GDR took them through Berlin, Weimar, Erfurt, Sommerda, Magdeburg, Dresden and Potsdam.

== Background ==
Details of the India-GDR relationship of those times is discussed by Sukhada Tatke in The Mint.

== Bibliography ==
- 20 Years of India-GDR Relations: An Anthology. New Delhi: All India Indo-GDR Friendship Association, 1974.
