= R. L. Bhatia =

Indian politician (1920–2021)

Raghunandan Lal Bhatia
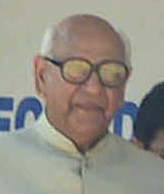
- Bhatia in 2005

21st Governor of Bihar
- In office 10 July 2008 – 28 June 2009
- Chief Minister: Nitish Kumar
- Preceded by: R. S. Gavai
- Succeeded by: Devanand Konwar

16th Governor of Kerala
- In office 23 June 2004 – 10 July 2008
- Chief Minister: A. K. Antony; Oommen Chandy; V. S. Achuthanandan
- Preceded by: T. N. Chaturvedi (Additional Charge)
- Succeeded by: R. S. Gavai

Personal details
- Born: 3 July 1920 Amritsar, Punjab, British India
- Died: 14 May 2021 (aged 100) Amritsar, Punjab, India
- Party: Indian National Congress
- Parent(s): Arooramal Bhatia, Lal Devi Bhatia
- Education: University of the Punjab

Raghunandan Lal Bhatia (3 July 1920 – 14 May 2021) was an Indian politician. He was the Governor of Kerala from 23 June 2004 to 10 July 2008, and was the Governor of Bihar from 10 July 2008 to 28 June 2009. He signed the Border Peace and Tranquility Agreement with China on behalf of the Republic of India.

== Biography ==
Bhatia was born to Arooramal Bhatia and Lal Devi Bhatia, in Amritsar, Punjab on 3 July 1920. He graduated from the University of the Punjab in Lahore, and received an LLB. After this, he served as a member of the governing body of Amritsar for nine years.

Bhatia was first elected to the Lok Sabha in 1972, from the Amritsar Lok Sabha constituency. He was re-elected to the Lok Sabha from the same constituency at the 1980, 1985, 1992, 1996 and 1999 elections as a member of the Indian National Congress. During this time, he held several other posts as well. He was a member of the executive committee of Congress parliamentary party from 1975 to 1977, the Minister of State for External Affairs in the Government of India from July 1992 until 1993, the Chairman of the Committee of petitions in Lok Sabha in 1983, the President of the Punjab Pradesh Congress Committee 1982 through 1984, the General Secretary of AICC in 1991, and also a member of the select committee constituted in 1992 for the amendment of the constitution.

During his time in the Lok Sabha, Bhatia represented India as a delegate to the United Nations, and participated as a delegate in the 7th Summit of the Non-Aligned Movement held in Delhi, in March 1983, the Commonwealth Heads of Government Meeting in New Delhi in November 1983, the Sixth SAARC summit in Colombo in 1991, and the 5th meeting of coordinating countries of the action programme for economic cooperation of non-aligned countries held in Delhi in 1986.

Bhatia was also a member of the India Council for Cultural Relations from 1983 to 1984. He was chairman of the India Bulgaria Friendship Society from 1983 to 1990, and the Indo-GDR Friendship Association 1983 to 1990. He was also co-chairman of the All India Peace & Solidarity organization from 1981 to 1983, and the Vice President of Friends of Soviet Union from 1983 to 1984.

Following the death of Sikander Bakht in 2004, Bhatia became the Governor of Kerala. After spending four years in that post, Bhatia was appointed as the Governor of Bihar on 26 June 2008, switching posts with Bihar Governor R. S. Gavai. He was sworn in on 10 July 2008. He left office in 2009, and led a private life.

Bhatia died from COVID-19 in 2021.

Government offices
Preceded by T.N. Chaturvedi	Governor of Kerala; 23 June 2004 – 10 July 2008	Succeeded by R. S. Gavai
Preceded by R. S. Gavai	Governor of Bihar; 10 July 2008 – 28 June 2009	Succeeded by Devanand Konwar
