= Anil Joshi =

Indian politician

MLA, Punjab
- In office 2007–2017
- Preceded by: Jugal Kishore Sharma
- Constituency: Amritsar North

Minister for Local Bodies, Medical Education & Research (Punjab)
- In office 2012–2017
- Chief Minister: Parkash Singh Badal
- Preceded by: Chuni Lal Bhagat

Personal details
- Born: 31 March 1964 (age 62) Sanghe, India
- Party: Indian National Congress
- Spouse: Monika Joshi
- Children: 2
- Website: http://www.aniljoshibjp.com

Anil Joshi is a politician from Amritsar, Punjab, India who was serving as Minister for Local Bodies, Medical Education & Research in the previous Punjab Government. He joined the Shiromani Akali Dal party in 2021 following his expulsion from the BJP. He was first elected as a member of Punjab Legislative Assembly from Amritsar North Constituency in 2007 and then re-elected in 2012. On 30 September 2025, he joined Indian National Congress

== Early life ==
Joshi was born on 31 March 1964 in Sanghe, District Tarn Taran. His father's name is Kishori Lal Joshi and mother's name Pushpa Rani Joshi.

== Political career ==
He successfully contested election from Amritsar North in 2007 as a BJP candidate. In 2012 he was re-elected from Amritsar North. He was cabinet minister and holding portfolio of Local Bodies, Medical Education & Research. He lost to Sunil Dutti (Congress) by 14000 votes in 2017 Punjab assembly election. He was colloquially known as "Vikas Purush" because of his significant development work done in North Amritsar Constituency. In July 2021 he left the Bharatiya Janta Party for six years for opposing the party line in the farmers' protest.. He joined Shiromani Akali Dal in August 2021 and on 30 September 2025, he joined Indian National Congress

== Personal life ==
He married Monika Joshi on 7 October 1992. He has two sons (Paras Joshi and Amit Joshi).
