= The Great Indian Kapil Show =

Indian comedy and talk show

- Genre: Sketch comedy Talk show
- Created by: Kapil Sharma
- Starring: Kapil Sharma; Archana Puran Singh; Navjot Singh Sidhu; Sunil Grover; Kiku Sharda; Krushna Abhishek
- Country of origin: India
- Original language: Hindi
- No. of seasons: 4
- No. of episodes: 53 + 2SP

Production
- Executive producer: Anushree Bhardwaj
- Producers: Kapil Sharma; Akshit Lahoria; Gurjot Singh
- Production location: Film City, Mumbai
- Camera setup: Multi-camera
- Running time: 45–79 minutes
- Production companies: K9 Films; Beingu Studios

Original release
- Network: Netflix
- Release: 30 March 2024 – present

The Great Indian Kapil Show is an Indian Hindi-language sketch comedy talk show hosted by comedian Kapil Sharma. The show is streaming on Netflix since 30 March 2024. It is Netflix's first Indian series to trend globally for a month. Season 1 ended on 22 June 2024 with 13 episodes. Season 2 streamed from 21 September 2024 to 14 December 2024. Season 3 premiered on 21 June 2025 and ended on 20 September 2025. Season 4 premiered on 20 December 2025 and ended on 14 March 2026. The series is renewed for a fifth season.

== Premise ==
The series format is largely identical of Sharma's former shows The Kapil Sharma Show and Comedy Nights with Kapil. Kapil Sharma hosts this laugh-out-loud variety talk show with celebrity guests, hilarious antics and his signature supporting cast. The show revolves around Kapil Sharma and his team of comedians, including Sunil Grover, Kiku Sharda, Krushna Abhishek and Rajiv Thakur. The set of the play is modelled after an airport terminal, featuring elements such as a waiting area, retail kiosks, a revolving café, and a café named Kap's. Archana Puran Singh is the permanent guest of the show.

== Cast ==
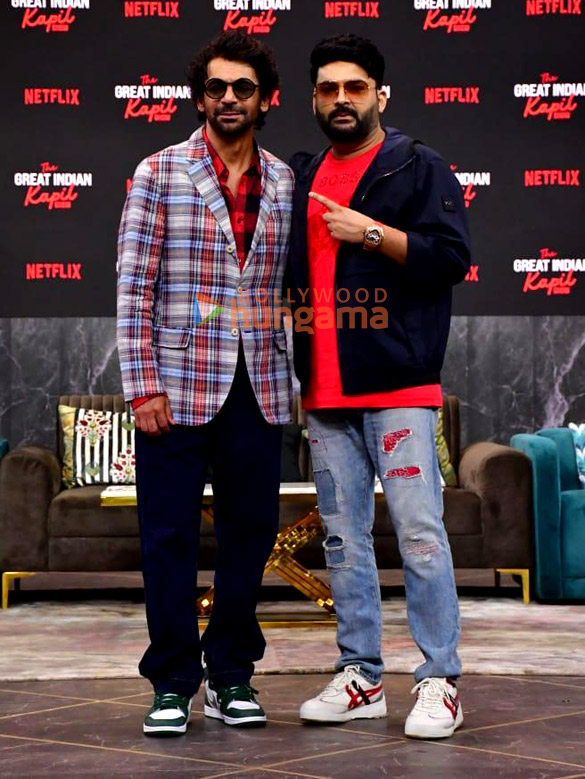
Sharma (right) and Grover (left) at a press conference for the show in April 2024

- Kapil Sharma as Himself (Host)
- Archana Puran Singh as Permanent Guest
- Navjot Singh Sidhu as Permanent Guest (Season 3, 5)
- Sunil Grover as Dafli / Engineer Chumbak Mittal / Couple Paaji (Kapil Dev's mimic) / Kamlesh ki Lugai / Kha Ke (PK's mimic) / Dharmendra's mimic / Cherry Paaji (Navjot Singh Sidhu's mimic) / The Great Kya Khali (The Great Khali's mimic) / Rajagoli (Rajamouli's mimic) Karan (Salman Khan's mimic) / Unees–Bees Aamir (Aamir Khan's mimic) / Mithun Chakraborty's mimic / Father Khan (Kader Khan's mimic) / Saral Bihari Vajpayee (Atal Bihari Vajpayee's mimic) and various characters
- Kiku Sharda as Chef Dhaniya Lal / Bade Bhaiya (Sunny Deol's mimic) / Kim Kong (Kim Jong Un's mimic) / Pahlawan Fokat / Chandra Mukhi / Filmy Maa / Motapa and various characters
- Krushna Abhishek as Air Hostess Mona / Chote Bhaiya (Bobby Deol's Animal style mimic) / Doland Drunk (Donald Trump's mimic) / Dharmendra's mimic / Ranvijay (Ranbir Kapoor's Animal style mimic) / Chunni Babu / Wallhadin / Arjun (Shah Rukh Khan's Pathaan style mimic) / Sivagami's mimic Almost Govinda (Govinda's mimic) and various characters
- Rajiv Thakur as Raju (Kap's Cafe Attendant) / Fajini (Ghajini's mimic) and various characters
- Manju Brijnandan Sharma as Chef (season 2)
- Soundous Moufakir as Lucia (season 2)
- Sanket Bhosale as Baba (Sanjay Dutt's mimic) (season 3)
- Sugandha Mishra as Sohni (season 4)

== Episodes ==
=== Overview ===
Series	Episodes	Originally released	
Series	Episodes	First released	Last released
1	13	30 March 2024	22 June 2024
2	13	21 September 2024	14 December 2024
3	14	21 June 2025	20 September 2025
4	13	20 December 2025	14 March 2026
Special 1		2 May 2026	
Special 2		15 August 2026	
5	TBA	26 September 2026	TBA

=== Season 1 ===
No. overall	No. in season	Title	Guest(s)	Original release date	Featured promotion	Ref.
1	1	"Ranbir Kapoor - The Real Family Man"	Ranbir Kapoor, Neetu Kapoor and Riddhima Kapoor Sahni	30 March 2024	—N/a	
2	2	"Cricket Fever"	Rohit Sharma and Shreyas Iyer	06 April 2024	—N/a	
3	3	"Stars of Chamkila"	Diljit Dosanjh, Parineeti Chopra and Imtiaz Ali	13 April 2024	Amar Singh Chamkila	
4	4	"Brothers in Arms"	Vicky Kaushal and Sunny Kaushal	20 April 2024	—N/a	
5	5	"Aamir Unlimited"	Aamir Khan	27 April 2024	—N/a	
6	6	"Dil Se Deol"	Sunny Deol and Bobby Deol	04 May 2024	—N/a	
7	7	"Diamonds Of Heeramandi"	Sonakshi Sinha, Manisha Koirala, Aditi Rao Hydari, Richa Chadha, Sanjeeda Sheikh and Sharmin Segal	11 May 2024	Heeramandi	
8	8	"The Perfect Artist"	Ed Sheeran	18 May 2024	—N/a	
9	9	"Fun With Friends"	Anil Kapoor and Farah Khan	25 May 2024	—N/a	
10	10	"Perfect Partnership"	Rajkummar Rao and Janhvi Kapoor	01 June 2024	Mr. & Mrs. Mahi	
11	11	"Game Changers"	Sania Mirza, Mary Kom, Saina Nehwal and Sift Kaur Samra	08 June 2024	—N/a	
12	12	"Kings of Hip Hop"	Badshah, Divine and Karan Aujla	15 June 2024	—N/a	
13	13	"Kartik Aaryan and Khandaan"	Kartik Aaryan and Mala Tiwari	22 June 2024	Chandu Champion	

=== Season 2 ===
No. overall	No. in season	Title	Guest(s)	Original release date	Featured promotion	Ref.
14	1	"Bonded By Love"	Alia Bhatt, Karan Johar, Vedang Raina and Vasan Bala	21 September 2024	Jigra	
15	2	"South Sensations"	N. T. Rama Rao Jr., Saif Ali Khan and Janhvi Kapoor	28 September 2024	Devara: Part 1	
16	3	"World Cup Champions"	Rohit Sharma, Suryakumar Yadav, Axar Patel, Arshdeep Singh and Shivam Dube	05 October 2024	—N/a	
17	4	"Superstar Sisters"	Kareena Kapoor and Karisma Kapoor	12 October 2024	—N/a	
18	5	"Karwa Chauth with the Fabulous Wives"	Maheep Kapoor, Bhavana Pandey, Seema Kiran Sajdeh, Neelam Kothari, Shalini Passi, Kalyani Saha Chawla and Riddhima Kapoor Sahni	19 October 2024	Fabulous Lives vs Bollywood Wives	
19	6	"Double Trouble with Kriti and Kajol"	Kriti Sanon, Kajol, Shaheer Sheikh and Kanika Dhillon	26 October 2024	Do Patti	
20	7	"Bhoot Bhari Diwali"	Kartik Aaryan, Vidya Balan, Triptii Dimri, Rajpal Yadav and Anees Bazmee	02 November 2024	Bhool Bhulaiyaa 3	
21	8	"Business Baazigars"	N. R. Narayana Murthy, Sudha Murty, Deepinder Goyal and Grecia Munoz Goyal	09 November 2024	—N/a	
22	9	"Punjab Ke Sher"	Navjot Singh Sidhu, Harbhajan Singh, Geeta Basra and Navjot Kaur Sidhu	16 November 2024	—N/a	
23	10	"Shotgun with the Sinhas"	Sonakshi Sinha, Zaheer Iqbal, Shatrughan Sinha and Poonam Sinha	23 November 2024	—N/a	
24	11	"Entertainer No. 1"	Govinda, Chunky Panday and Shakti Kapoor	30 November 2024	—N/a	
25	12	"Evergreen Icon"	Rekha	07 December 2024	—N/a	
26	13	"Varun In Action"	Varun Dhawan, Keerthy Suresh, Wamiqa Gabbi, Atlee and Kalees	14 December 2024	Baby John	

=== Season 3 ===
No. overall	No. in season	Title	Guest(s)	Original release date	Featured promotion	Ref.
27	1	"Being Salman"	Salman Khan	21 June 2025	Sikandar	
28	2	"Metro Fun"	Anupam Kher, Neena Gupta, Ali Fazal, Konkona Sen Sharma, Pankaj Tripathi, Anurag Basu, Fatima Sana Shaikh, Aditya Roy Kapur and Sara Ali Khan	28 June 2025	Metro... In Dino	
29	3	"Coach and the Cricketers"	Gautam Gambhir, Rishabh Pant, Yuzvendra Chahal and Abhishek Sharma	05 July 2025	—N/a	
30	4	"Streaming Superstars"	Jaideep Ahlawat, Vijay Varma, Pratik Gandhi, Jitendra Kumar and Jackson Wang	12 July 2025	—N/a	
31	5	"Sardaron Ka Swag"	Ajay Devgn, Mrunal Thakur, Vindu Dara Singh, Sanjay Mishra, Ravi Kishan, Kubbra Sait and Deepak Dobriyal	19 July 2025	Son of Sardaar 2	
32	6	"Mic Drop with Podcasters"	Raj Shamani, Saurabh Dwivedi, Kamiya Jani and Samdish Bhatia	26 July 2025	—N/a	
33	7	"Parineeti - Raghav ki Prem Sabha"	Parineeti Chopra and Raghav Chadha	02 August 2025	—N/a	
34	8	"Dil Dosti Bhai-Behen"	Shilpa Shetty, Shamita Shetty, Saqib Saleem and Huma Qureshi	09 August 2025	—N/a	
35	9	"Musical Mehfil"	Shaan, Vishal Dadlani, Shekhar Ravjiani and Neeti Mohan	16 August 2025	—N/a	
36	10	"Business Ke Gamechangers"	Vijay Shekhar Sharma, Aman Gupta, Ritesh Agarwal and Ghazal Alagh	23 August 2025	—N/a	
37	11	"Love and Laughs with Param Sundari"	Sidharth Malhotra, Janhvi Kapoor, Sanjay Kapoor, Manjot Singh and Inayat Verma	30 August 2025	Param Sundari	
38	12	"Yaaron Ka Adda"	Sanjay Dutt and Suniel Shetty	06 September 2025	—N/a	
39	13	"South Superstars"	Jagapathi Babu, Teja Sajja, Shriya Saran and Ritika Nayak	13 September 2025	Mirai	
40	14	"Khiladi Returns"	Akshay Kumar	20 September 2025	Jolly LLB 3	

=== Season 4 ===
No. overall	No. in season	Title	Guest(s)	Original release date	Featured promotion	Ref.
41	1	"Desi Girl, Global Swag"	Priyanka Chopra	20 December 2025	—N/a	
42	2	"Queens of Cricket"	Harmanpreet Kaur, Harleen Deol, Richa Ghosh, Pratika Rawal, Jemimah Rodrigues, Deepti Sharma, Renuka Singh, Shafali Verma, Radha Yadav, Amol Muzumdar	27 December 2025	—N/a	
43	3	"New Year, New Love"	Kartik Aaryan, Ananya Panday	03 January 2026	Tu Meri Main Tera Main Tera Tu Meri	
44	4	"Blockbuster Bhojpuri Stars"	Manoj Tiwari, Pawan Singh, Dinesh Lal Yadav	10 January 2026	—N/a	
45	5	"Dosti Ki Hattrick"	Yuvraj Singh, Virender Sehwag, Mohammad Kaif	17 January 2026	—N/a	
46	6	"Fierce and Fabulous"	Rani Mukerji	24 January 2026	Mardaani 3	
47	7	"Bolti Bandh, Laughter On"	Aditi Rao Hydari, Vijay Sethupathi, Siddharth Jadhav, A. R. Rahman	31 January 2026	Gandhi Talks	
48	8	"Brown Munde"	AP Dhillon, Anubhav Singh Bassi, Shinda Kahlon	07 February 2026	—N/a	
49	9	"Romeo Ki Valentine"	Shahid Kapoor, Triptii Dimri, Avinash Tiwary, Farida Jalal, Vishal Bhardwaj	14 February 2026	O'Romeo	
50	10	"Jab Bhidu Went Dhak Dhak"	Jackie Shroff, Madhuri Dixit	21 February 2026	—N/a	
51	11	"Masti Ki Paathshala"	Khan Sir, Alakh Pandey, Nitin Vijay	28 February 2026	—N/a	
52	12	"Masti Ka Mahamix"	Ravi Kishan, Malaika Arora, Orry	7 March 2026	—N/a	
53	13	"Family No. 1"	David Dhawan, Varun Dhawan	14 March 2026	—N/a	

=== Special 1 (World Laughter Day) ===
No.	Title	Guest(s)	Original release date	Featured promotion	Ref.
54	The Return of Samay Raina and Ranveer Allahbadia	Samay Raina, Ranveer Allahbadia, Sunil Pal	2 May 2026	—N/a	

=== Special 2 ===
No.	Title	Guest(s)	Original release date	Featured promotion	Ref.
55	"Celebrating India's Real Heroes"	Siddharth, Jimmy Shergill, Abhay Verma, Dia Mirza, Prajakta Koli, Mihir Ahuja, Taaruk Raina, Arnav Bhasin, Amrita Bagchi	15 August 2026	Operation Safed Sagar	

=== Season 5 ===
No. overall	No. in season	Title	Guest(s)	Original release date	Featured promotion	Ref.
56	1	"Hassi Ka Tyohaar - With Ajay Devgn"	Ajay Devgn, Shriya Saran, Jaideep Ahlawat, Ishita Dutta, Mrunal Jadhav, Abhishek Pathak	26 September 2026	Drishyam: The Conclusion	
57	2	"Into the Vvan: Sidharth Malhotra and Tamannaah Bhatia"	Sidharth Malhotra, Tamannaah Bhatia, Anup Soni, Shweta Tiwari, Maniesh Paul	3 October 2026	The Vvaan: Force of the Forrest	
58	3	"Beyond the Boundary - Ravi Shastri and Sunil Gavaskar"	Sunil Gavaskar, Ravi Shastri	10 October 2026	—N/a	
59	4	"Royally Funny - Saif Ali Khan and Kareena Kapoor Khan"	Saif Ali Khan, Kareena Kapoor Khan	17 October 2026	—N/a	
60	5	"Music Ke Dhurandhar - With Rishabh Rikiram, Jasmine Sandlas, Satinder Sartaj and Shashwat Sachdeva"	Rishab Rikhiram, Jasmine Sandlas, Satinder Sartaaj, Shashwat Sachdev	24 October 2026	—N/a	
61	6	"Family Wali Diwali - Shahid Kapoor, Mira Kapoor and Ishaan Khatter"	Shahid Kapoor, Mira Rajput, Ishaan Khatter	31 October 2026	—N/a	
62	7	"Yaaron Ki Mehfil - Pankaj Tripathi, Zakir Khan and Dr. Vikas Divyakirti"	Pankaj Tripathi, Zakir Khan, Vikas Divyakirti	7 November 2026	—N/a	
63	8	"Prem Bhara Parivaar - Sooraj R. Barjatya, Ayushmann Khurrana and Sharvari"	Ayushmann Khurrana, Sharvari, Sooraj Barjatya, Supriya Pathak, Seema Pahwa, Saumya Tandon, Swanand Kirkire, Geeta Agarwal Sharma, Surbhi Tiwari	14 November 2026	Yeh Prem Mol Liya	
64	9	Sur Ki Rani, Rap Ka Badshah: Shreya Ghoshal & Badshah	Shreya Ghoshal, Badshah	21 November 2026	—N/a	
65	10	(TBC)	Manoj Bajpayee, Ashutosh Rana	28 November 2026		
