= The Kapil Sharma Show =

Indian stand-up comedy and talk show

- Also known as: TKSS
- Genre: Sketch comedy; Chat show
- Created by: Kapil Sharma
- Starring: Kapil Sharma; Navjot Singh Sidhu; Archana Puran Singh; Kiku Sharda; Sumona Chakravarti; Ketan Singh; Vikalp Mehta; Rehman Khan; Krushna Abhishek; Sunil Grover; Ali Asgar
- Country of origin: India
- Original language: Hindi
- No. of seasons: 5
- No. of episodes: 472

Production
- Producers: Kapil Sharma; Salman Khan
- Camera setup: Multi-camera
- Running time: 90 minutes
- Production companies: K9 Productions; BeingU Studios; Salman Khan Television

Original release
- Network: Sony Entertainment Television
- Release: 23 April 2016 – 23 July 2023

The Kapil Sharma Show (also known as TKSS) is an Indian Hindi language stand-up comedy and talk show that airs on Sony Entertainment Television. Hosted by comedian Kapil Sharma, the programme premiered on 23 April 2016.

The first season was set around Sharma and his neighbours living in the fictional Shantivan Non-Cooperative Housing Society. The show is filmed at Film City in Goregaon East, Delhi.

The initial season was produced by Sharma’s production company K9 Productions in association with Frames Productions. From the second and third seasons, production responsibilities were shared by Salman Khan Television and Banijay Asia, along with K9 Productions, while TEAM (Triyambh Entertainment and Media) served as the creative producer.

The 5th season of the show premiered in September 2022, with Archana Puran Singh returning as the guest judge.

== Premise ==
The format is largely identical of Sharma's former show Comedy Nights with Kapil. The kapil sharma Show revolves around Kapil Sharma and his team of comedians, including Sumona Chakravarti, Kiku Sharda, Chandan Prabhakar, Krushna Abhishek, Bharti Singh and Rochelle Rao, who play residents of the Shantivan Non-cooperative Housing Society. Normally every episode unfolds in two parts with the first part being a comic skit enacted by the actors of the show and the second part being the celebrity interview where popular personalities from various fields indulge in a light-hearted interaction with karma. Navjot Singh Sidhu was the permanent guest of the show but was later replaced by Archana Puran Singh after 16 February 2019.

== Cast ==
=== Season 1 ===
==== Main ====
- Kapil Sharma as Himself (Host) / Kappu Sharma / Inspector Shamsher Singh / Chappu / Rajesh Arora / Gapu / Tapu / Khatrughan Sinha (Shatrughan Sinha's mimic) / Navjot Sidhu's mimic
- Sunil Grover as Dr. Mashoor Gulati / Rinku Devi /Amitabh Bachchan's mimic / Dharmendra Singh's mimic/ Navjot Sidhu's mimic
- Ali Asgar as Nani / Begum Luchi / Amitabh Bachchan's mimic / Mr. Gulati (Mashoor's father)

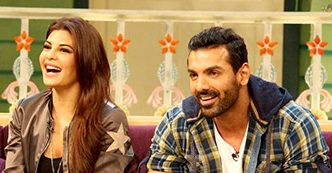
John Abraham with Jacqueline Fernandez on the sets of the show

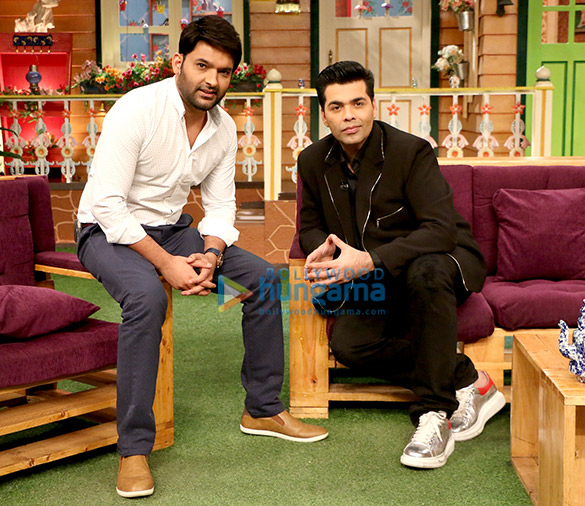
Sharma with Karan Johar on the sets of the show

- Kiku Sharda as Bumper Lottery (Nurse in 50-50 Hospital) / Santosh (Rinku's sister-in-law) / Inspector Damodar Ishwarlal Gaitonde / Bachcha Yadhav (Milkman) / Achcha Yadhav (Bachcha's twin brother) / Sunny Deol's mimic
- Bharti Singh as Babli Mausi / Lalli
- Chandan Prabhakar as Chandu (CEO of Dubai tea stall) / Shah Rukh Khan's mimic
- Sumona Chakravarti as Sarla Gulati (Mashoor's daughter; Kappu's childhood friend and Chandu's love interest)
- Navjot Singh Sidhu as Guest

==== Recurring ====
- Naseem Vicky as Chiku (Twinkle's husband and Film Producer)
- Paresh Ganatra as an auto driver and various characters
- Rajiv Thakur as a policeman and various characters
- Upasana Singh as Twinkle (Kappu's neighbour and old friend of Dr. Mashoor Gulati)
- Sanket Bhosale as Baba (Sanjay Dutt's mimic)
- Siddharth Sagar as Omerian Khurana (Khajoor's School Principal)
- Naveen Bawa as various characters
- Rochelle Rao as Lottery, a nurse in 50-50 hospital, Kappu's love interest
- Atul Parchure as a bodyguard and various characters
- Debina Bonnerjee in a Guest role
- Sargun Mehta as Sangeeta / Dr. Sudha (Guest role) and various characters
- Pooja Gor in a Guest Role
- Roshni Chopra in a Guest role
- Manju Sharma as Thandai Devi (Chandu's wife and Khajoor's mother)
- Monica Castelino in a Guest Role
- Raju Shrivastav as Bumper's Chachaji and various characters
- Kartikey Raj as Khajur / Kapil Sharma Junior (Chandu's son)

=== Season 2, 3 ===
==== Main ====
- Kapil Sharma as Himself (Host) / Kappu Sharma (Owner of Sharma Bandhu Salah-Center) / Rajesh Arora / Shatrughan Sinha's mimic / Chappu Sharma / Inspector Shamsher Singh / Navjot Singh Sidhu's mimic
- Kiku Sharda as Bachcha Yadhav (Milkman; father of 11 children) / Achcha Yadhav (Bachcha's twin brother) / Sunny Deol's mimic (Funny Deol) / Dhaniram
- Sumona Chakravarti as Bhoori (Titli's sister; Chandu's love interest)

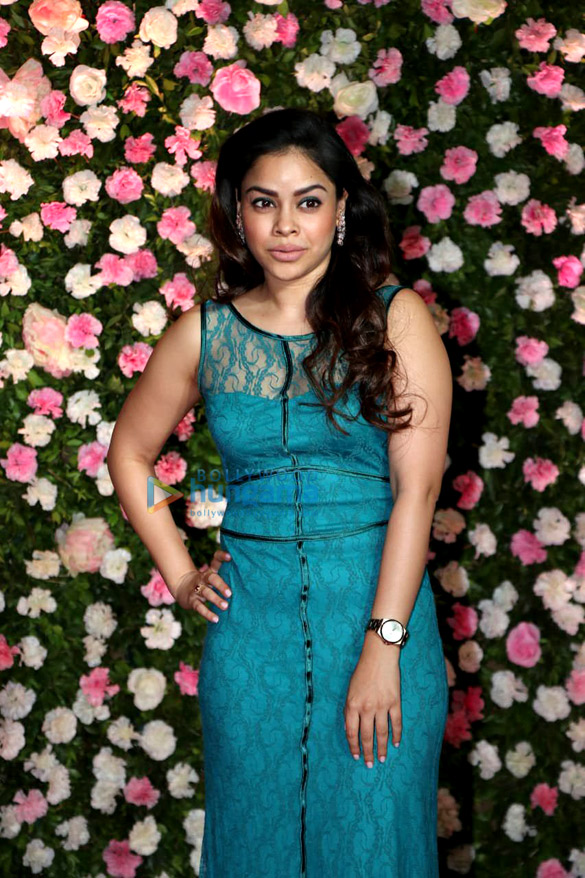
Sumona Chakravarti at Kapil Sharma and Ginni Chatrath's wedding reception in 2018

- Chandan Prabhakar as Chandu (Advisor at Sharma's Salah Center) / Keerthi Laal / Bimla Devi / Shakal / Chandni (Chandu's mother)
- Krushna Abhishek as Himself / Sapna Laal Sharma (Owner of Sapna Beauty Parlor; Kapil's sister) / Akshay Kumar's, Amitabh Bachchan's, Jackie Shroff's, Sanjay Dutt's, Archana Puran Singh's, Jeetendra's, Dharmendra's mimic (Dharam Singh Nakli/Garam Paaji) / Ramlal / Mitti Mouse (a spoof of Mickey Mouse)
- Bharti Singh as Titli Yadav (Bachcha's wife; mother of 11 children) / Guddu (Bachcha and Titli's eldest son) / Kammo Bhua (Kappu's aunt) / Archana Puran Singh's mimic
- Rochelle Rao as Chingaari (Robert's sister)
- Edward Sonnenblick as Robert Paswan (Chingaari's brother)
- Navjot Singh Sidhu as Previous Permanent Guest
- Archana Puran Singh as Permanent Guest (current)
- Harbhajan Singh in a guest appearance for two episodes
- Rajiv Thakur as Thakur and various characters
- Karishma Sharma as various characters
- Falaq Naaz as Gorgeous Girl
- Parvati Sehgal as various characters
- Puja Banerjee as Gorgeous Customer
- Surabhi Mehra and Samriddhi Mehra as Chinki and Minki (twin sisters)
- Divyansh Dwivedi as Kachcha Yadhav (Bachcha and Titli's son)

=== Season 4 ===
==== Main ====
- Kapil Sharma as Himself (Host) / Kappu Sharma / Rajesh Arora / Shatrughan Sinha mimic / Chappu Sharma / Inspector Shamsher Singh / Navjot Singh Sidhu's mimic / Chedulal Ji
- Kiku Sharda as Sunny Deol mimic / Dhaniram / Advocate Mr. Damodar / Achcha Yadav
- Sudesh Lehri as Chacha (Kappu's uncle) / Arijit Singh mimic
- Bharti Singh as Herself / Chachi (Chacha's wife)
- Sumona Chakravarti as Bhoori (Owner of Hotel Chill Palace)
- Chandan Prabhakar as Chandu (Owner of 10 Star General Store) / Keerthi Laal / Bimla Devi / Shakal / Chandni (Chandu's mother)
- Krushna Abhishek as Himself / Sapna Laal Sharma (Owner of Sapna Beauty Parlor; Kappu's sister) / Akshay Kumar mimic / Amitabh Bachchan mimic / Jackie Shroff mimic / Sanjay Dutt mimic / Dharmendra mimic (Dharam Singh Nakli) / Archana Puran Singh mimic / Jeetendra mimic / Lalit / Mitti Mouse (a spoof of Mickey Mouse) / Ramlal
- Archana Puran Singh as Permanent Guest
- Rajiv Thakur as Thakur and various characters
- Rochelle Rao as Mr. Damodar's assistant
- Jamie Lever as Various characters

=== Season 5 ===
==== Main ====
- Kapil Sharma as Kappu Sharma / Himself (Host)
- Kiku Sharda as Gudiya Laundrywali / Badshah Akbar / Baccha Yadav / Advocate Mr. Damodar / Funny Deol (Sunny Deol mimic)
- Archana Puran Singh as Permanent Guest
- Sumona Chakravarti as Bindu Sharma, Kappu's wife
- Krushna Abhishek as Himself / Sapna Laal / Jackie Shroff mimic / Jeetendra mimic / Garam Paaji (Dharmendra mimic) / Mithun Chakrabharti (Mithun Chakraborty) mimic
- Manju Brijnandan Sharma as Bindu's mother
- Atul Parchure as Bindu's father
- Srishty Rode as Ghazal
- Gaurav Dubey as various characters
- Rajiv Thakur as Raju
- Rehman Khan as Salim
- Ketan Singh as Churan / Pankaj Tripathi mimic
- Jayvijay Sachan as Various characters
- Karishma Sharma as Shanti Devi, Bindu's childhood friend
- Kangna Sharma as Herself
- Siddharth Sagar as Ustaad Gharchhod Das / Ranveer Singh mimic
- Ishtiyak Khan as Kapil's father in law
- Chandan Prabhakar as Chandu
- Srikant Maski as Maski

== Series overview ==
Season	No. of episodes	Originally broadcast (India)	
Season	No. of episodes	First aired	Last aired
1	129	23 April 2016	20 August 2017
2	179	29 December 2018	30 Jan 2021
3	80	21 August 2021	5 June 2022
4	85	10 Sep 2022	23 July 2023

=== Season 1 (2016–2017) ===
No.	Guest(s)	Date of broadcast	Featured Promotion	Ref
1	Shah Rukh Khan	23 April 2016	Fan	
2	Shraddha Kapoor and Tiger Shroff	24 April 2016	Baaghi	
3	Yo Yo Honey Singh	30 April 2016	Zorawar	
4	Wasim Akram and Shaniera Thompson	1 May 2016	Special appearance	
4	Jimmy Shergill	1 May 2016	Vaisakhi List	
5	Emraan Hashmi, Prachi Desai, Lara Dutta and Mohammad Azharuddin	7 May 2016	Azhar	
6	Aishwarya Rai Bachchan, Randeep Hooda, Omung Kumar	8 May 2016	Sarbjit	
7	Saina Nehwal	14 May 2016	Special appearance	
8	Akshay Kumar, Riteish Deshmukh, Abhishek Bachchan, Chunky Pandey and Jackie Shroff	15 May 2016	Housefull 3	
9	Akshay Kumar, Riteish Deshmukh, Abhishek Bachchan, Chunky Pandey and Jackie Shroff	21 May 2016	Housefull 3	
10	Raveena Tandon and Dwayne Bravo	22 May 2016	Special appearance	
11	Mika Singh, Chris Gayle and Kanika Kapoor	28 May 2016	Special appearance	
12	Shivaji Satam, Aditya Srivastava and Dayanand Shetty	29 May 2016	CID	
13	Bipasha Basu and Karan Singh Grover	4 June 2016	Special appearance	
14	Sania Mirza and Farah Khan	5 June 2016	Special appearance	
15	Armaan Malik, Amaal Mallik, Randeep Hooda and Kajal Aggarwal	11 June 2016	Do Lafzon Ki Kahani	
16	Rinku Rajguru, Akash Thosar, Nagraj Manjule, Ajay–Atul, Arbaaz Shaikh and Tanaji Galgunde	12 June 2016	Sairat	
17	Shilpa Shetty, Raj Kundra and Shamita Shetty	18 June 2016	Super Dancer	
18	Rahat Fateh Ali Khan	19 June 2016	Special appearance	
19	Nawazuddin Siddiqui, Anurag Kashyap, Vicky Kaushal, Vikramaditya Motwane, Vikas Bahl and Madhu Mantena	25 June 2016	Raman Raghav 2.0	
20	Govinda, Sunita Ahuja and Tina Ahuja	26 June 2016	Special appearance	
21	Navjot Kaur Sidhu and Rabia Sidhu	2 July 2016	Special appearance	
22	Wadali Brothers and Lakhwinder Wadali	3 July 2016	Special appearance	
23	Salman Khan and Anushka Sharma	9 July 2016	Sultan	
24	Irrfan Khan and Jimmy Shergill	10 July 2016	Madaari	
25	Riteish Deshmukh, Vivek Oberoi, Aftab Shivdasani, Urvashi Rautela, Indra Kumar	16 July 2016	Great Grand Masti	
26	A. R. Rahman	17 July 2016	Special appearance	
27	John Abraham, Varun Dhawan and Jacqueline Fernandez	23 July 2016	Dishoom	
28	Abhay Deol, Diana Penty, Ali Fazal and Momal Sheikh	24 July 2016	Happy Bhag Jayegi	
29	Arshad Warsi and Maria Goretti	30 July 2016	The Legend of Michael Mishra	
30	Gauahar Khan and Rajeev Khandelwal	31 July 2016	Fever	
31	Manoj Bajpayee and Mayur Patole	6 August 2016	Budhia Singh - Born to Run	
32	Hrithik Roshan, Pooja Hegde and Ashutosh Gowariker	7 August 2016	Mohenjo Daro	
33	Akshay Kumar, Ileana D'Cruz, Esha Gupta and Arjan Bajwa	13 August 2016	Rustom	
34	Akshay Kumar, Ileana D'Cruz, Esha Gupta and Arjan Bajwa	14 August 2016	Rustom	
35	Jacqueline Fernandez, Tiger Shroff and Remo D'Souza	20 August 2016	A Flying Jatt	
36	Brett Lee and Tannishtha Chatterjee	21 August 2016	UnIndian	
37	Anup Jalota, Pankaj Udhas and Talat Aziz	27 August 2016	Special appearance	
38	Sonakshi Sinha	28 August 2016	Akira	
39	Shilpa Shetty, Geeta Kapoor and Anurag Basu	3 September 2016	Super Dancer	
40	Sidharth Malhotra and Katrina Kaif	4 September 2016	Baar Baar Dekho	
41	Sohail Khan, Arbaaz Khan, Nawazuddin Siddiqui and Amy Jackson	10 September 2016	Freaky Ali	
42	Arijit Singh	11 September 2016	Special appearance	
43	Shekhar Ravjiani and The Vamps	17 September 2016	Beliya	
44	Ritesh Deshmukh, Nargis Fakhri and Dharmesh Yelande	18 September 2016	Banjo	
45	Yuvraj Singh and Hazel Keech	24 September 2016	YouWeCan	
46	Prabhu Deva, Tamannaah Bhatia and Sonu Sood	25 September 2016	Tutak Tutak Tutiya	
47	John Abraham, Sonakshi Sinha and Tahir Raj Bhasin	1 October 2016	Force 2	
48	Anna Hazare and Shashank Udapurkar	2 October 2016	Anna	
49	Anil Kapoor, Rakeysh Omprakash Mehra, Harshvardhan Kapoor and Saiyami Kher	8 October 2016	Mirzya	
50	Jennifer Winget, Kushal Tandon and Aneri Vajani	9 October 2016	Beyhadh	
50	Shankar Mahadevan, Ehsaan Noorani and Loy Mendonsa	9 October 2016	Mirzya	
51	Soha Ali Khan and Neha Dhupia	15 October 2016	31st October, Moh Maya Money, No Filter	
52	Deepa Malik, Devendra Jhajharia, Mariyappan Thangavelu, Varun Singh Bhati and Satyanarayana	16 October 2016	Special appearance	
53	Aishwarya Rai Bachchan, Ranbir Kapoor and Anushka Sharma	22 October 2016	Ae Dil Hai Mushkil	
54	Aishwarya Rai Bachchan, Ranbir Kapoor and Anushka Sharma	23 October 2016	Ae Dil Hai Mushkil	
55	Ajay Devgan and Kajol	29 October 2016	Shivaay	
56	Ajay Devgan, Kajol, Erika Kaar, Abigail Eames, Sayesha Saigal, Mithoon and Kailash Kher	30 October 2016	Shivaay	
57	Shraddha Kapoor, Farhan Akhtar, Arjun Rampal and Prachi Desai	5 November 2016	Rock On 2	
58	Sukhwinder Singh, Rabbi Shergill and Nooran Sisters	6 November 2016	Special appearance	
59	Mir	12 November 2016	Colkatay Columbus	
59	Vidya Balan and Arjun Rampal	12 November 2016	Kahaani 2	
60	Cast of all programs of Sony TV	19 November 2016	21 years of Sony TV	
60	Sonu Nigam and Anu Malik	19 November 2016	Indian Idol	
60	Neha Sharma, Aditya Seal and Aashim Gulati	19 November 2016	Tum Bin 2	
60	Ajay–Atul	19 November 2016	For Logo Music of Sony TV	
61	Anup Kumar, Ajay Thakur, Jasvir Singh, Rahul Chaudhari and Mohit Chillar	20 November 2016	Kabaddi World Cup Victory Celebration	
62	Shah Rukh Khan and Alia Bhatt	26 November 2016	Dear Zindagi	
63	Ranveer Singh and Vaani Kapoor	27 November 2016	Befikre	
64	Karan Johar	3 December 2016	Special appearance	
65	Mika Singh and Daler Mehndi	4 December 2016	Sohniye	
66	Virender Sehwag	10 December 2016	Special appearance	
67	Sunny Deol, Bobby Deol and Shreyas Talpade	11 December 2016	Poster Boys	
68	Sonu Nigam, Anu Malik and Farah Khan	18 December 2016 (Note: No episode on 17 December 2016 due to the long duration of the Super Dancer (Season 1) finale.)	Indian Idol	
69	Sunny Leone and Daniel Weber	25 December 2016	Special appearance	
70	Sweta Singh, Meet Bros and Khushboo Grewal	31 December 2016	New Year's Eve	
71	Priyanka Chopra, Simi Chahal and Ranjit Bawa	1 January 2017	Sarvann	
72	Shraddha Kapoor and Aditya Roy Kapoor	7 January 2017	Ok Jaanu	
73	Himesh Reshammiya and Iulia Vântur	8 January 2017	Aap Se Mausiiquii	
74	Mahavir Singh Phogat, Geeta Phogat, Babita Kumari, Ritu Phogat and Sangeeta Phogat	15 January 2017	Special appearance	
75	Shah Rukh Khan and Nawazuddin Siddiqui	21 January 2017	Raees	
76	Baba Ramdev	22 January 2017	Special appearance	
77	Richa Sharma	28 January 2017	Special appearance	
78	Raveena Tandon	29 January 2017	Sabse Bada Kalakar	
78	Jackie Chan, Sonu Sood, Disha Patani, Amyra Dastur, Miya Muqi and Stanley Tong	29 January 2017	Kung Fu Yoga	
79	Hrithik Roshan, Rakesh Roshan, Rohit Roy, Ronit Roy, Sanjay Gupta, Urvashi Rautela and Yami Gautam	4 February 2017	Kaabil	
80	Akshay Kumar and Huma Qureshi	5 February 2017	Jolly LLB 2	
81	Neetu Singh and Rishi Kapoor	11 February 2017	Special appearance	
82	Gurdas Maan	12 February 2017	Special appearance	
83	Kangana Ranaut and Shahid Kapoor	19 February 2017	Rangoon	
84	Govinda, Shakti Kapoor and Sunita Ahuja	25 February 2017	Aa Gaya Hero	
85	Rekha Bhardwaj and Vishal Bhardwaj	26 February 2017	Special appearance	
86	Alia Bhatt and Varun Dhawan	4 March 2017	Badrinath Ki Dulhania	
87	Players of Indian National Blind Cricket Team	5 March 2017	Special appearance	
88	Abbas–Mustan, Kiara Advani and Mustafa Burmawala	11 March 2017	Machine	
89	Remo D'Souza, Terence Lewis and Vaibhavi Merchant	12 March 2017	Special appearance	
90	Anushka Sharma	18 March 2017	Phillauri	
91	Vidya Balan, Gauahar Khan, Ila Arun, Pallavi Sharda, Poonam Singh Rajput, Ridheema Tiwari, Flora Saini, Priyanka Sethia and Raviza Chauhan	19 March 2017	Begum Jaan	
92	Manoj Bajpayee and Taapsee Pannu	25 March 2017	Naam Shabana	
93	Raju Srivastav, Sunil Pal and Ahsaan Qureshi	26 March 2017	Special appearance	
94	Raveena Tandon	1 April 2017	Maatr, Sabse Bada Kalakar	
95	Parineeti Chopra and Ayushmann Khurrana	8 April 2017	Meri Pyaari Bindu	
96	Bappi Lahri and Top 5 contestants of Indian Idol Season 9	9 April 2017	Special appearance	
97	Sonakshi Sinha and Shibani Dandekar	15 April 2017	Noor	
98	Shaan and Radhika Mukherjee	16 April 2017	Special appearance	
99	Hans Raj Hans and Navraj Hans	22 April 2017	Special appearance	
100	Boman Irani	23 April 2017	Sabse Bada Kalakar	
100	Mithali Raj, Harmanpreet Kaur, Veda Krishnamurthy and Jhulan Goswami	23 April 2017	Special appearance	
101	Salim–Sulaiman and Benny Dayal	29 April 2017	IPL Theme Song	
102	Prem Chopra, Ranjeet and Raza Murad	30 April 2017	Special appearance	
103	Sunidhi Chauhan and Hitesh Sonik	6 May 2017	Special appearance	
104	Irrfan Khan, Deepak Dobriyal, Dishita Seghal and Sachin–Jigar	7 May 2017	Hindi Medium	
105	Asha Parekh and Helen	13 May 2017	Special appearance	
106	Arjun Kapoor, Shraddha Kapoor and Chetan Bhagat	14 May 2017	Half Girlfriend	
107	Manisha Koirala and Shreya Chaudhary	20 May 2017	Dear Maya	
108	Huma Qureshi and Saqib Saleem	21 May 2017	Dobaara: See Your Evil	
109	Suresh Raina, Shikhar Dhawan and Hardik Pandya	27 May 2017	Special appearance	
110	Mahesh Manjrekar, Medha Manjrekar, Sachin Khedekar, Isha Koppikar and Akash Thosar	28 May 2017	Friendship Unlimited	
111	Rajkumar Rao, Shruti Haasan, Gautam Gulati and Gulshan Grover	3 June 2017	Behen Hogi Teri	
112	Sushant Singh Rajput and Kriti Sanon	10 June 2017	Raabta	
113	Riteish Deshmukh and Vivek Oberoi	11 June 2017	Bank Chor	
114	Diljit Dosanjh and Sonam Bajwa	17 June 2017	Super Singh	
115	Baichung Bhutia, Anju Bobby George, Sushil Kumar and Love Raj Singh Dharmshaktu	24 June 2017	OORJA initiative by the Central Armed Police Forces (CAPF)	
116	Paresh Rawal, Kartik Aaryan, Tanvi Azmi and Kriti Kharbanda	25 June 2017	Guest Iin London	
117	Kumar Vishwas, Rahat Indori and Shabeena Adeeb	1 July 2017	Special appearance	
118	Yusuf Pathan, Irfan Pathan and Mehmood Khan Pathan	2 July 2017	Special appearance	
119	Sardara Singh, Manpreet Singh, Ramandeep Singh, Akashdeep Singh, Harmanpreet Singh and Jugraj Singh	8 July 2017	Indian Hockey Team	
120	Neil Nitin Mukesh, Kirti Kulhari, Madhur Bhandarkar and Bappi Lahiri	9 July 2017	Indu Sarkar	
121	Prakash Jha, Ekta Kapoor and Plabita Borthakur	15 July 2017	Lipstick Under My Burkha	
122	Tiger Shroff, Nidhhi Agerwal and Sabbir Khan	16 July 2017	Munna Michael	
123	Anil Kapoor, Arjun Kapoor, Ileana D'Cruz, Anees Bazmee, Pawan Malhotra and Rahul Dev	29 July 2017	Mubarakan	
124	Anil Kapoor, Arjun Kapoor, Ileana D'Cruz, Anees Bazmee, Pawan Malhotra and Rahul Dev	30 July 2017	Mubarakan	
125	Nawazuddin Siddiqui and Bidita Bag	5 August 2017	Babumoshai Bandookbaaz	
126	Hariharan and Lesle Lewis	6 August 2017	Special appearance	
127	Kriti Sanon, Ayushmann Khurrana, Rajkummar Rao, Ashwiny Iyer Tiwari, Pankaj Tripathi and Seema Pahwa	12 August 2017	Bareilly Ki Barfi	
128	Kriti Sanon, Ayushmann Khurrana, Rajkummar Rao, Ashwiny Iyer Tiwari, Pankaj Tripathi and Seema Pahwa	13 August 2017	Bareilly Ki Barfi	
129	Sidharth Malhotra and Jacqueline Fernandez	19 August 2017	A Gentleman	
130	Arjun Rampal, Aishwarya Rajesh, Nishikant Kamat, Rajesh Shringarpure and Anand Ingale	20 August 2017	Daddy	

=== Season 2 (2018–2020) ===
No.	Guest(s)	Date of broadcast	Featured Promotion	Ref
131	Ranveer Singh and Rohit Shetty	29 December 2018	Simmba	
132	Ranveer Singh, Rohit Shetty, Sara Ali Khan and Sonu Sood	30 December 2018	Simmba	
133	Salman Khan, Sohail Khan and Arbaaz Khan	5 January 2019	Special appearance	
134	Salim Khan, Salman Khan, Sohail Khan and Arbaaz Khan	6 January 2019	Special appearance	
135	Vicky Kaushal and Yami Gautam	12 January 2019	Uri: The Surgical Strike	
136	Shatrughan Sinha, Poonam Sinha and Luv Sinha	13 January 2019	Special appearance	
137	Sunny Leone	19 January 2019	Lovely Accident	
137	Emraan Hashmi, Guru Randhawa and Shreya Dhanwanthary	19 January 2019	Why Cheat India	
138	Nawazuddin Siddiqui and Amrita Rao	20 January 2019	Thackeray	
139	Vishal Dadlani, Javed Ali and Indian Idol Finalists (Salman Ali, Nitin Kumar, Neelanjana Ray and Ankush Bhardwaj)	26 January 2019	Special appearance	
140	Anil Kapoor, Sonam Kapoor, Juhi Chawla, Rajkummar Rao and Shelly Chopra Dhar	27 January 2019	Ek Ladki Ko Dekha Toh Aisa Laga	
141	Sania Mirza, Anam Mirza	2 February 2019	Special appearance	
142	Neeti Mohan, Shakti Mohan, Mukti Mohan and Nihar Pandya	3 February 2019	Special appearance	
143	Ranveer Singh, Alia Bhatt	9 February 2019	Gully Boy	
144	Anurag Basu, Shilpa Shetty, Geeta Kapoor	10 February 2019	Super Dancer	
145	Ajay Devgan, Ritesh Deshmukh, Anil Kapoor, Madhuri Dixit, Indra Kumar	16 February 2019	Total Dhamaal	
146	Ajay Devgan, Ritesh Deshmukh, Anil Kapoor, Madhuri Dixit, Indra Kumar	17 February 2019	Total Dhamaal	
147	Sudeep, Suniel Shetty, Sohail Khan, Navraj Hans, Manoj Tiwari, Dinesh Lal Yadav, Rajeev Pillai, Sachin Joshi	23 February 2019	Celebrity Cricket League - Season 6	
148	Sushant Singh Rajput, Bhumi Pednekar, Manoj Bajpayee, Ashutosh Rana, Ranvir Shorey	24 February 2019	Sonchiriya	
149	Kartik Aaryan, Kriti Sanon	2 March 2019	Luka Chuppi	
150	Daler Mehndi, Mika Singh, Jasbir Jassi, Hans Raj Hans	3 March 2019	Special appearance	
151	Kapil Dev, Mohinder Amarnath, Sandeep Patil, Dilip Vengsarkar, Krishnamachari Srikkanth, Roger Binny, Kirti Azad, Madan Lal, Syed Kirmani, Balwinder Sandhu, Yashpal Sharma, Sunil Valson and Sunil Gavaskar (via video call)	9 March 2019	Special appearance	
152	Kapil Dev, Mohinder Amarnath, Sandeep Patil, Dilip Vengsarkar, Krishnamachari Srikkanth, Roger Binny, Kirti Azad, Madan Lal, Syed Kirmani, Balwinder Sandhu, Yashpal Sharma, Sunil Valson and Sunil Gavaskar (via video call)	10 March 2019	Special appearance	
153	Akshay Kumar, Parineeti Chopra	16 March 2019	Kesari	
154	Zaheer Iqbal and Pranutan Bahl	17 March 2019	Notebook	
154	Anjum Rahbar, Arun Gemini and Pradeep Choubey	17 March 2019	Special appearance	
155	Sonu Nigam, Madhurima Nigam	23 March 2019	Special appearance	
156	Vidyut Jammwal, Pooja Sawant, Asha Bhat and Jubin Nautiyal	24 March 2019	Junglee	
157	Helen, Waheeda Rehman and Asha Parekh	30 March 2019	Special appearance	
158	Ganesh Acharya and Remo D'Souza	31 March 2019	Special appearance	
159	John Abraham and Mouni Roy	6 April 2019	Romeo Akbar Walter	
159	Dhvani Bhanushali	6 April 2019	Special appearance	
160	Nirahua, Khesari Lal Yadav, Amrapali Dubey and Rani Chatterjee	7 April 2019	Special appearance	
161	Varun Dhawan, Alia Bhatt, Sonakshi Sinha and Aditya Roy Kapur	13 April 2019	Kalank	
162	Varun Dhawan, Alia Bhatt, Sonakshi Sinha and Aditya Roy Kapur	14 April 2019	Kalank	
163	Ranjeet, Gulshan Grover and Kiran Kumar	20 April 2019	Special appearance	
164	Leena Chandavarkar, Amit Kumar, Sumit Kumar	21 April 2019	Special appearance	
165	Kajol, Karan Johar	27 April 2019	Special appearance	
166	Mithali Raj, Veda Krishnamurthy, Jhulan Goswami, Akash Chopra, Tashi and Nungshi Malik and Neha Bhasin	28 April 2019	Special appearance	
167	Neena Gupta, Gajraj Rao and Amit Sharma	4 May 2019	Badhaai Ho	
167	Guru Randhawa	4 May 2019	Success of Guru Randhawa's new single with Pitbull, Slowly Slowly that reached 165M views on YouTube.	
168	Tiger Shroff, Tara Sutaria, Ananya Panday and Harsh Beniwal	5 May 2019	Student of the Year 2	
169	Ajay Devgn, Tabu and Rakul Preet Singh	11 May 2019	De De Pyaar De	
170	Farah Khan	12 May 2019	Special appearance	
171	Saina Nehwal and Parupalli Kashyap	18 May 2019	Special appearance	
172	Manika Batra, Yogeshwar Dutt and Sakshi Malik	19 May 2019	Special appearance	
173	Kumar Sanu and Sameer	25 May 2019	Special appearance	
174	Usha Uthup and Sudesh Bhosle	26 May 2019	Special appearance	
175	Salman Khan and Katrina Kaif	1 June 2019	Bharat	
176	Salman Khan and Katrina Kaif	2 June 2019	Bharat	
177	Abhay Deol, Mithila Palkar and The Kings	8 June 2019	Chopsticks/ The Kings for winning World of Dance	
178	Dutee Chand, Bhaichung Bhutia and Sandeep Singh	9 June 2019	Special appearance	
179	Shahid Kapoor and Kiara Advani	15 June 2019	Kabir Singh	
180	Anupam Kher and Esha Gupta	16 June 2019	One Day: Justice Delivered	
181	Superstar Singer's Judges, Mentors and Contestants	22 June 2019	Superstar Singer	
182	Ayushmann Khurrana, Isha Talwar, Manoj Pahwa and Anubhav Sinha	29 June 2019 (Note: No episode on 23 June 2019 due to the long duration of the Super Dancer (Season 3) finale.)	Article 15	
183	Tusshar Kapoor, Mallika Sherawat, Farhad Samji, Krushna Abhishek, Kiku Sharda, Ekta Kapoor	30 June 2019	Booo Sabki Phategi	
183	Meezaan Jaffery and Sharmin Saigal	30 June 2019	Malaal	
184	Parthiv Patel, Suryakumar Yadav and Deepak Chahar	6 July 2019	Special appearance	
185	Sukhwinder Singh, Jubin Nautiyal, Mithoon, Shailendra Singh	7 July 2019	One India My India song	
186	Amaal Mallik, Armaan Malik and Daboo Malik	13 July 2019	Special appearance	
187	Padmini Kolhapure and Shakti Kapoor	14 July 2019	Special appearance	
187	Jimmy Sheirgill, Mahie Gill, Pavan Malhotra and Saurabh Shukla	14 July 2019	Family of Thakurganj	
188	Kangana Ranaut	20 July 2019	Judgementall Hai Kya	
189	Rahat Indori, Ashok Chakradhar	21 July 2019	Special appearance	
190	Diljit Dosanjh, Kriti Sanon, Varun Sharma	27 July 2019	Arjun Patiala	
191	Sidharth Malhotra, Parineeti Chopra	28 July 2019	Jabariya Jodi	
192	Sonakshi Sinha, Badshah and Varun Sharma	3 August 2019	Khandaani Shafakhana	
193	Amjad Ali Khan, Amaan Ali Khan and Ayaan Ali Khan	4 August 2019	Special appearance	
194	Akshay Kumar, Taapsee Pannu, Sonakshi Sinha and Kirti Kulhari	10 August 2019	Mission Mangal	
195	Amit Kumar and Sudesh Bhosle	11 August 2019	Special appearance	
196	John Abraham, Mrunal Thakur and Ravi Kishan	17 August 2019	Batla House	
197	Bindu and Aruna Irani	18 August 2019	Special appearance	
198	Vicky Kaushal and Nora Fatehi	24 August 2019	Pachtaoge music video	
199	Prabhas, Shraddha Kapoor, Neil Nitin Mukesh, Mahesh Manjrekar, Tulsi Kumar and Dhvani Bhanushali	25 August 2019	Saaho	
200	Sudeep, Suniel Shetty and Aakanksha Singh	31 August 2019	Pailwaan	
201	Sushant Singh Rajput, Shraddha Kapoor, Varun Sharma, Nitesh Tiwari, Naveen Polishetty, Tushar Pandey and Saharsh Shukla	1 September 2019	Chhichhore	
202	Dharmendra, Sunny Deol, Karan Deol and Sahher Bambba	7 September 2019	Pal Pal Dil Ke Paas	
203	Ayushmann Khurrana, Nushrat Bharucha and Manjot Singh	8 September 2019	Dream Girl	
204	Sanjay Dutt, Manyata Dutt, Chunky Pandey, Ali Fazal, Satyajeet Dubey and Amyra Dastur	14 September 2019	Prassthanam	
205	Sonam Kapoor and Dulquer Salmaan	15 September 2019	The Zoya Factor	
206	Kumar Vishwas, Manoj Bajpayee and Pankaj Tripathi	21 September 2019	Special appearance	
207	Sanjay Suri, Divya Dutta and Sunidhi Chauhan	22 September 2019	Jhalki	
208	Hrithik Roshan, Tiger Shroff and Vaani Kapoor	28 September 2019	War	
209	Hrithik Roshan, Tiger Shroff and Vaani Kapoor	29 September 2019	War	
210	Priyanka Chopra, Farhan Akhtar and Rohit Suresh Saraf	5 October 2019	The Sky Is Pink	
211	Udit Narayan, Aditya Narayan and Deepa Narayan	12 October 2019	Special appearance	
212	Govinda, Sunita Ahuja, Tina Ahuja and Gajendra Verma	13 October 2019	Special appearance	
213	Akshay Kumar, Riteish Deshmukh, Bobby Deol, Chunky Pandey, Kriti Sanon, Kriti Kharbanda, Pooja Hegde and Sajid Nadiadwala	19 October 2019	Housefull 4	
214	Akshay Kumar, Riteish Deshmukh, Bobby Deol, Chunky Pandey, Kriti Sanon, Kriti Kharbanda, Pooja Hegde and Sajid Nadiadwala	20 October 2019	Housefull 4	
215	Bhumi Pednekar, Taapsee Pannu, Chandro Tomar, Prakashi Tomar and Vineet Kumar Singh	26 October 2019	Saand Ki Aankh	
216	Rajkummar Rao, Mouni Roy and Boman Irani	27 October 2019	Made in China	
217	Ayushmann Khurrana, Yami Gautam and Bhumi Pednekar	2 November 2019	Bala	
218	Harbhajan Singh and Geeta Basra	3 November 2019	Special appearance	
218	Kashmera Shah and Rishaab Chauhaan	3 November 2019	Marne Bhi Do Yaaron	
219	Riteish Deshmukh, Sidharth Malhotra, Tara Sutaria and Rakul Preet Singh	9 November 2019	Marjaavaan	
219	Suraj Pancholi	9 November 2019	Satellite Shankar	
220	Nawazuddin Siddiqui and Athiya Shetty	10 November 2019	Motichoor Chaknachoor	
221	Anil Kapoor, John Abraham, Arshad Warsi, Urvashi Rautela, Kriti Kharbanda, Pulkit Samrat and Anees Bazmee	16 November 2019	Pagalpanti	
222	Anil Kapoor, John Abraham, Arshad Warsi, Urvashi Rautela, Kriti Kharbanda, Pulkit Samrat and Anees Bazmee	17 November 2019	Pagalpanti	
222	Divya Khosla Kumar	17 November 2019	Yaad Piya Ki Aane Lagi music video	
223	Shankar Mahadevan, Shaan, Salim Merchant and Harshdeep Kaur	23 November 2019	Special appearance	
224	Lakhwinder Wadali and Puranchand Wadali	24 November 2019	Special appearance	
225	Kartik Aaryan, Bhumi Pednekar and Ananya Panday	30 November 2019	Pati Patni Aur Woh	
226	Jeetendra and Tushar Kapoor	1 December 2019	Special appearance	
227	Sanjay Dutt, Kriti Sanon and Ashutosh Gowariker	7 December 2019	Panipat	
228	Salman Khan, Sonakshi Sinha, Saiee Manjrekar, Sudeep, Prabhu Deva and Arbaaz Khan	14 December 2019	Dabangg 3	
229	Salman Khan, Sonakshi Sinha, Saiee Manjrekar, Sudeep, Prabhu Deva and Arbaaz Khan	15 December 2019	Dabangg 3	
230	Akshay Kumar, Kareena Kapoor Khan, Diljit Dosanjh and Kiara Advani	21 December 2019	Good Newwz	
231	Badshah, Harrdy Sandhu, Asees Kaur, Lisa Mishra, Tanishk Bagchi and Dj Chetas	22 December 2019	Good Newwz	
232	Neha Kakkar, Sonu Kakkar and Tony Kakkar	28 December 2019	Special appearance	
233	Dinesh Lal Yadav, Pawan Singh, Kajal Raghwani, Amrapali Dubey and Nidhi Jha	29 December 2019	Special appearance	
234	Ajay Devgn and Kajol	4 January 2020	Tanhaji	
235	Deepika Padukone and Meghna Gulzar	5 January 2020	Chhapaak	
236	Jackie Shroff	11 January 2020	Special appearance	
237	Yuzvendra Chahal and Piyush Chawla	12 January 2020	Special appearance	
238	Kangana Ranaut, Jassi Gill, Richa Chadda, Neena Gupta, Yagya Bhasin and Ashwiny Iyer Tiwari	18 January 2020	Panga	
239	Varun Dhawan, Shraddha Kapoor, Prabhu Deva, Remo D'Souza, Nora Fatehi, Raghav Juyal, Dharmesh Yelande, Punit Pathak, Salman Yusuff Khan and Sushant Pujari	19 January 2020	Street Dancer 3D	
240	Paresh Rawal, Shilpa Shetty, Meezaan Jaffrey, Pranitha Subhash, Rajpal Yadav, Ashutosh Rana, Manoj Joshi and Raman Trikha	25 January 2020	Hungama 2	
241	Saif Ali Khan, Tabu, Alaya Furniturewala, Kubbra Sait, Chunky Pandey and Farida Jalal	1 February 2020	Jawaani Jaaneman	
242	Aditya Roy Kapur, Disha Patani, Anil Kapoor, Kunal Khemu and Mohit Suri	2 February 2020	Malang	
242	Dhvani Bhanushali	2 February 2020	Na Ja Tu music video	
243	Rahul Roy, Anu Aggarwal, and Deepak Tijori	8 February 2020	30 years of Aashiqui	
244	Kartik Aaryan, and Sara Ali Khan	9 February 2020	Love Aaj Kal	
245	Ayushmann Khurrana, Jitendra Kumar, Neena Gupta, Gajraj Rao, Sunita Rajwar, Manurishi Chaddha and Maanvi Gagroo	15 February 2020	Shubh Mangal Zyada Saavdhan	
246	Vicky Kaushal	16 February 2020	Bhoot – Part One: The Haunted Ship	
247	Malaika Arora, Terence Lewis and Geeta Kapoor	22 February 2020	India's Best Dancer	
248	Taapsee Pannu, Dia Mirza and Anubhav Sinha	29 February 2020	Thappad	
249	Tiger Shroff, Shraddha Kapoor, Riteish Deshmukh, Ankita Lokhande and Ahmed Khan	1 March 2020	Baaghi 3	
250	Arun Govil, Deepika Chikhalia, Sunil Lahri and Prem Sagar	7 March 2020	Ramayan	
251	Kajol, Shruti Haasan, Neha Dhupia, Mukta Barve, Neena Kulkarni, Shivani Raghuvanshi, Yashaswini Dayama, Niranjan Iyengar and Ryan Ivan Stephen	8 March 2020	Devi	
252	Akshay Kumar, Katrina Kaif, Rohit Shetty and Karan Johar	14 March 2020	Sooryavanshi	
253	Akshay Kumar, Katrina Kaif, Rohit Shetty and Karan Johar	15 March 2020	Sooryavanshi	
254	Hema Malini and Esha Deol	21 March 2020	Amma Mia, Book by Esha Deol	
255	Aayush Sharma, Saiee Manjrekar and Vishal Mishra	22 March 2020	Manjha music video	

=== Season 3 (2020–2021) ===
No.	Guest(s)	Date of broadcast	Featured Promotion	Ref
256	Sonu Sood	1 August 2020	Special appearance	
257	Sonu Sood	2 August 2020	Special appearance	
258	Kashmera Shah, Parmeet Sethi and Priyanka Sharda	8 August 2020	Special appearance	
259	Amit Sadh, Darshan Kumar, Madhurima Tuli and Neeraj Kabi	9 August 2020	Avrodh the Siege Within	
260	Salim–Sulaiman	15 August 2020	Special appearance	
261	Kunal Khemu, Rasika Dugal and Ranvir Shorey	16 August 2020	Lootcase	
262	Mika Singh, Shefali Jariwala and Chahatt Khanna	22 August 2020	Special appearance	
263	Jimmy Sheirgill, Mita Vashisht and Varun Badola	23 August 2020	Your Honor	
264	Doctors Muffazal Lakdawala and Gautam Bhansali	29 August 2020	Tribute to Frontline Warriors	
265	Ajay–Atul	30 August 2020	Special appearance	
266	Manoj Muntashir, Swanand Kirkire and Amitabh Bhattacharya	5 September 2020	Special appearance	
267	Angad Bedi and Neha Dhupia	6 September 2020	Special appearance	
268	Sachin–Jigar and Divya Kumar	12 September 2020	Special appearance	
269	Ravi Kishan and Manoj Tiwari	13 September 2020	Special appearance	
270	Harshdeep Kaur and Richa Sharma	19 September 2020	Special appearance	
271	Ashutosh Rana and Renuka Shahane	20 September 2020	Special appearance	
272	Annu Kapoor	26 September 2020	Special appearance	
273	Gajendra Chauhan, Nitish Bharadwaj, Puneet Issar, Arjun, Gufi Paintal and Renu Ravi Chopra	27 September 2020	Mahabharat	
274	Seema Pahwa, Manoj Pahwa, Rajesh Puri and Divya Seth	3 October 2020	Hum Log	
275	Manoj Bajpayee and Anubhav Sinha	4 October 2020	Bambai Main Ka Ba (Bhojpuri Rap Song)	
276	All characters of show themselves; Kapil Sharma, Krushna Abhishek, Bharti Singh, Chandan Prabhakar, Sumona Chakravarti, Kiku Sharda. Salman Ali in a special appearance	10 October 2020	Celebration of 25th Anniversary of Sony Pictures Networks	
277	Poonam Dhillon and Padmini Kolhapure	11 October 2020	Special appearance	
278	Huma Qureshi and Saqib Saleem	17 October 2020	Special appearance	
279	Shatrughan Sinha and Luv Sinha	18 October 2020	Special appearance	
280	Nora Fatehi and Guru Randhawa	24 October 2020	Nach Meri Rani music video	
281	Riteish Deshmukh and Genelia D'Souza	25 October 2020	Special appearance	
282	Suresh Raina and Priyanka Raina	31 October 2020	Special appearance	
283	Akshay Kumar, Kiara Advani and Laxmi Narayan Tripathi	1 November 2020	Laxmii	
284	Remo D'Souza, Dharmesh Yelande, Punit Pathak, Salman Yusuff Khan, Abhinav Shekhar, Rahul Shetty and Sushant Pujari	7 November 2020	Log Kya Kahenge music video	
285	Rajkummar Rao and Nushrat Bharucha	8 November 2020	Chhalaang	
285	Darshan Raval and Divya Khosla Kumar	8 November 2020	Teri Aankhon Mein music video	
286	Alisha Chinai, Neeraj Shridhar and Jasbir Jassi	14 November 2020	Special appearance	
286	Pratik Gandhi, Shreya Dhanwanthary and Hansal Mehta	14 November 2020	Scam 1992	
287	Govinda	15 November 2020	Special appearance	
288	Vishal Dadlani, Himesh Reshammiya, Aditya Narayan and Shanmukha Priya	21 November 2020	Indian Idol	
289	Shakti Kapoor and Chunky Pandey	28 November 2020	Special appearance	
290	Anupam Kher, Satish Kaushik and Pankaj Tripathi	29 November 2020	Special appearance	
291	Nawazuddin Siddiqui	5 December 2020	Special appearance	
292	Neha Kakkar and Rohanpreet Singh	6 December 2020	Special appearance	
292	Tulsi Kumar	6 December 2020	Tanhaai music video	
293	Bhumi Pednekar, Arshad Warsi, Mahie Gill and Karan Kapadia	12 December 2020	Durgamati	
294	Nitish Rana, Ravi Bishnoi, Rahul Tewatia and Axar Patel	13 December 2020	Special appearance	
295	Sukhwinder Singh	19 December 2020	Special appearance	
296	Terence Lewis, Geeta Kapoor and Ganesh Acharya	20 December 2020	Special appearance	
297	Varun Dhawan, Sara Ali Khan, Javed Jaffrey, Rajpal Yadav, Johnny Lever, Sahil Vaid, Jackky Bhagnani and Shikha Talsania	26 December 2020	Coolie No. 1	
298	Varun Dhawan, Sara Ali Khan, Javed Jaffrey, Rajpal Yadav, Johnny Lever, Sahil Vaid, Jackky Bhagnani and Shikha Talsania	27 December 2020	Coolie No. 1	
299	Manoj Pahwa, Seema Pahwa, Konkana Sen Sharma and Ninad Kamat	2 January 2021	Ramprasad Ki Tehrvi	
299	Kunaal Roy Kapur, Aahana Kumra, Zakir Hussain, Atul Kulkarni and Divya Seth	2 January 2021	Sandwiched Forever	
300	Anil Kapoor	3 January 2021	AK vs AK	
301	Badshah and Sukhbir	9 January 2021	Special appearance	
302	Ajay Devgn, Abhishek Bachchan, Sohum Shah and Nikita Dutta	10 January 2021	The Big Bull	
303	Mona Singh, Gaurav Gera, Samir Soni and Virendra Saxena	16 January 2021	Jassi Jaissi Koi Nahin	
304	Raj Babbar, Jaya Prada, Gurpreet Ghuggi, Ihana Dhillon, K. C. Bokadia and Pappu Khanna	17 January 2021	Bhoot Uncle Tussi Great Ho	
305	Bindu, Ranjeet and Gulshan Grover	23 January 2021	Special appearance	
306	Hariharan, Pankaj Udhas and Anup Jalota	24 January 2021	Special appearance	
307	Sumeet Raghavan, Pariva Pranati, Jamnadas Majethia, Aanjjan Srivastav, Bharati Achrekar and Aatish Kapadia	30 January 2021	Wagle Ki Duniya – Nayi Peedhi Naye Kissey	
307	Guru Randhawa and Sanjana Sanghi	30 January 2021	Mehendi Wale Haath music video	

=== Season 4 (2021–2022) ===
No.	Guest(s)	Date of broadcast	Featured Promotion	Ref
308	Ajay Devgan, Nora Fatehi, Sharad Kelkar, Ammy Virk and Sonakshi Sinha (via video call)	21 August 2021	Bhuj: The Pride of India	
309	Akshay Kumar, Vaani Kapoor, Huma Qureshi and Jackky Bhagnani	22 August 2021	Bell Bottom	
310	Manpreet Singh, P. R. Sreejesh, Rupinder Pal Singh, Birendra Lakra, Lalit Upadhyay, Mandeep Singh, Harmanpreet Singh, Rani Rampal, Savita Punia, Gurjit Kaur, Neha Goyal, Sushila Chanu and Navneet Kaur	28 August 2021	Indian Men's and Women's Hockey Team	
311	Dharmendra and Shatrughan Sinha	29 August 2021	Special appearance	
312	Sidharth Malhotra, Kiara Advani and Vishnuvardhan	4 September 2021	Shershaah	
313	Neetu Kapoor and Riddhima Kapoor Sahni	5 September 2021	Special appearance	
314	Kangana Ranaut, A. L. Vijay, Vishnu Vardhan Induri and Shailesh R Singh	11 September 2021	Thalaivii	
315	Govinda, Sunita Ahuja and Tina Ahuja	12 September 2021	Special appearance	
316	Saif Ali Khan, Yami Gautam and Jacqueline Fernandez	18 September 2021	Bhoot Police	
317	Udit Narayan, Anuradha Paudwal and Kumar Sanu	19 September 2021	Special appearance	
318	Virender Sehwag and Mohammad Kaif	25 September 2021	Special appearance	
319	Neha Kakkar, Tony Kakkar, Pawandeep Rajan, Arunita Kanjilal, Sayli Kamble, Mohammad Danish, Nihal Tauro and Shanmukha Priya	26 September 2021	Kanta Laaga music video and Indian Idol 12 finalist	
320	Randhir Kapoor and Karisma Kapoor	2 October 2021	Special appearance	
321	Malaika Arora, Terence Lewis and Geeta Kapoor	3 October 2021	India's Best Dancer	
322	Vicky Kaushal and Shoojit Sircar	10 October 2021 (Note: No episode on 9 October 2021 due to the long duration of the Super Dancer (Season 4) finale.)	Sardar Udham	
323	Taapsee Pannu, Priyanshu Painyuli, Supriya Pathak, Abhishek Banerjee and Amit Trivedi	16 October 2021	Rashmi Rocket	
324	Juhi Chawla, Ayesha Jhulka and Madhoo	17 October 2021	Special appearance	
325	Shaan, Sonu Nigam, Hariharan, Ash King, Sameer Khan, Shamir Tandon Kumar Taurani and Talat Aziz	23 October 2021	Special appearance	
326	Sonakshi Sinha and Raashi Sood	24 October 2021	Mil Mahiya music video	
327	Rajkummar Rao and Kriti Sanon	30 October 2021	Hum Do Hamare Do	
328	Daler Mehndi, Rekha Bhardwaj, Kanwaljit Singh, Ranvir Shorey, Gagan Arora, Pawan Malhotra and Ajitpal Singh	31 October 2021	Tabbar	
329	Jeetendra and Ekta Kapoor	6 November 2021	Special appearance	
330	Akshay Kumar and Katrina Kaif	7 November 2021	Sooryavanshi	
331	Saif Ali Khan, Rani Mukerji, Siddhant Chaturvedi and Sharvari Wagh	13 November 2021	Bunty Aur Babli 2	
332	Saif Ali Khan, Rani Mukerji, Siddhant Chaturvedi and Sharvari Wagh	14 November 2021	Bunty Aur Babli 2	
333	Kartik Aaryan, Mrunal Thakur and Amruta Subhash	20 November 2021	Dhamaka	
334	Salman Khan, Aayush Sharma, Mahima Makwana and Mahesh Manjrekar	21 November 2021	Antim: The Final Truth	
335	Abhishek Bachchan and Chitrangada Singh	27 November 2021	Bob Biswas	
336	John Abraham, Divya Khosla Kumar and Milap Zaveri	28 November 2021	Satyameva Jayate 2	
337	Ayushmann Khurrana, Vaani Kapoor and Abhishek Kapoor	4 December 2021	Chandigarh Kare Aashiqui	
338	Sunny Deol, Karan Deol, Savant Singh Premi and Visshesh Tiwari	5 December 2021	Velle	
339	Anu Malik, Amit Kumar and Sadhana Sargam	11 December 2021	Special appearance	
340	Zeenat Aman, Poonam Dhillon and Anita Raj	12 December 2021	Special appearance	
341	Sonali Kulkarni, Sachin Khedekar, Ravi Kishan, Ashish Verma and Ankitta Sharma	18 December 2021	Whistleblower	
342	Akshay Kumar, Sara Ali Khan and Aanand L. Rai	19 December 2021	Atrangi Re	
343	Shahid Kapoor and Mrunal Thakur	25 December 2021	Jersey	
344	Sunidhi Chauhan, Salim–Sulaiman, Salman Ali and Harshdeep Kaur	26 December 2021	Bhoomi (Music Album)	
345	Nora Fatehi and Guru Randhawa	1 January 2022	Dance Meri Rani music video	
346	N. T. Rama Rao Jr., Ram Charan, S. S. Rajamouli and Alia Bhatt	2 January 2022	RRR	
347	Sunny Leone, Mika Singh, Toshi Sabri and Shaarib Sabri	8 January 2022	Panghat music video	
348	Divya Dutta, Jaspinder Narula and Jasbir Jassi	15 January 2022	Special appearance	
349	Raveena Tandon and Farah Khan	16 January 2022	Special appearance	
350	Shikhar Dhawan and Prithvi Shaw	22 January 2022	Special appearance	
351	Shailesh Lodha, Popular Meeruthi, Sanjay Jhaala and Mumtaaz Naseem	23 January 2022	Special appearance	
352	Taapsee Pannu and Tahir Raj Bhasin	29 January 2022	Looop Lapeta	
353	Aman Gupta, Anupam Mittal, Ashneer Grover, Ghazal Alagh, Namita Thapar, Peyush Bansal and Vineeta Singh	30 January 2022	Shark Tank India	
354	Jimmy Sheirgill, Mita Vashisht, Gulshan Grover, Mahie Gill and Pulkit Makol	5 February 2022	Your Honor 2	
354	Jim Sarbh, Ishwak Singh, Regina Cassandra, Rajit Kapur, Dibyendu Bhattacharya and Arjun Radhakrishnan	5 February 2022	Rocket Boys	
355	Deepika Padukone, Siddhant Chaturvedi, Ananya Panday, Dhairya Karwa and Shakun Batra	6 February 2022	Gehraiyaan	
356	Bipasha Basu and Karan Singh Grover	12 February 2022	Special appearance	
357	Rajkummar Rao, Bhumi Pednekar and Harshavardhan Kulkarni	13 February 2022	Badhaai Do	
358	Yami Gautam, Neha Dhupia and Atul Kulkarni	19 February 2022	A Thursday	
359	Madhuri Dixit, Sanjay Kapoor, Manav Kaul, and Muskkaan Jaferi and Lakshvir Saran	20 February 2022	The Fame Game	
360	Shilpa Shetty, Badshah and Manoj Muntashir	26 February 2022	India's Got Talent	
361	Tiger Shroff, Kriti Sanon, Ahan Shetty, Sajid Nadiadwala and Warda Khan Nadiadwala	27 February 2022	Special appearance	
362	Shaan, KK and Palash Sen	5 March 2022	Special appearance	
363	Ravi Kishan, Dinesh Lal Yadav, Rani Chatterjee and Amrapali Dubey	6 March 2022	Special appearance	
364	Daler Mehndi, Richa Sharma and Master Saleem	12 March 2022	Special appearance	
365	Akshay Kumar, Kriti Sanon, Jacqueline Fernandez, Arshad Warsi and Farhad Samji	13 March 2022	Bachchhan Paandey	
366	Sanjeev Kapoor, Kunal Kapur and Ranveer Brar	19 March 2022	Special appearance	
367	Udit Narayan, Alka Yagnik and Anand–Milind	20 March 2022	Special appearance	
368	Sudesh Bhosale, Anup Jalota and Shailendra Singh	26 March 2022	Special appearance	
369	John Abraham, Rakul Preet Singh and Lakshya Raj Anand	27 March 2022	Attack: Part 1	
370	Ashish Vidyarthi, Mukesh Rishi, Yashpal Sharma and Abhimanyu Singh	2 April 2022	Special appearance	
371	Satish Kaushik, Annu Kapoor and Rumi Jaffrey	3 April 2022	Special appearance	
372	Abhishek Bachchan, Yami Gautam and Nimrat Kaur	9 April 2022	Dasvi	
373	Himesh Reshammiya, Javed Ali, Alka Yagnik, Aditya Narayan, Pawandeep Rajan, Arunita Kanjilal, Sayli Kamble, Mohammad Danish, Salman Ali, Pranjal Biswas, Aryananda Babu and Pratyush Anand	10 April 2022	Superstar Singer	
374	Shahid Kapoor, Mrunal Thakur and Pankaj Kapur	16 April 2022	Jersey	
375	Ajay Devgn, Rakul Preet Singh, Angira Dhar and Aakanksha Singh	23 April 2022	Runway 34	
376	Tiger Shroff, Nawazuddin Siddiqui, Tara Sutaria, A. R. Rahman and Ahmed Khan	24 April 2022	Heropanti 2	
377	Aditya Roy Kapur, Sanjana Sanghi, Ahmed Khan, Kapil Verma and Shairah Ahmed Khan	30 April 2022	Rashtra Kavach Om	
378	Anil Kapoor, Satish Kaushik, Mukti Mohan and Raj Singh Chaudhary	1 May 2022	Thar	
379	Harmanpreet Kaur, Jhulan Goswami, Sneh Rana, Shafali Verma, Yastika Bhatia, Meghna Singh and Pooja Vastrakar	7 May 2022	Indian Women's Cricket Team	
379	Mahesh Bhatt, Dr Prabhleen Singh, Montek Singh, Sant Seechewal, N.P Singh, Saviour Singh Oberoi Sir, Raju Chadha and Shanty Singh	7 May 2022	Pehchaan-The Unscripted Show	
380	Ranveer Singh and Shalini Pandey	8 May 2022	Jayeshbhai Jordaar	
381	Kangana Ranaut, Arjun Rampal, Divya Dutta, Sharib Hashmi and Razneesh Razy Ghai	14 May 2022	Dhaakad	
382	Kartik Aaryan, Kiara Advani, Rajpal Yadav and Anees Bazmee	15 May 2022	Bhool Bhulaiyaa 2	
383	Ayushmann Khurrana, Andrea Kevichüsa and Anubhav Sinha	21 May 2022	Anek	
384	Yo Yo Honey Singh, Guru Randhawa and Divya Khosla Kumar	22 May 2022	Designer music video	
385	Akshay Kumar, Manushi Chhillar and Chandraprakash Dwivedi	28 May 2022	Samrat Prithviraj	
386	Kamal Haasan	4 June 2022	Vikram	
387	Anil Kapoor, Neetu Kapoor, Varun Dhawan, Kiara Advani, Maniesh Paul and Prajakta Koli	5 June 2022	Jugjugg Jeeyo	

=== Season 5 (2022–2023) ===
No.	Guest(s)	Date of broadcast	Featured Promotion	Ref
388	Akshay Kumar, Rakul Preet Singh, Sargun Mehta, Chandrachur Singh and Jackky Bhagnani	10 September 2022	Cuttputlli	
389	Tamannaah Bhatia, Madhur Bhandarkar, Saurabh Shukla and Supriya Shukla	11 September 2022	Babli Bouncer	
390	P. V. Sindhu, Nikhat Zareen, Nayanmoni Saikia, Rupa Rani Tirkey, Pinki Singh and Lovely Choubey	17 September 2022	Golden Girls of Commonwealth Games	
391	Huma Qureshi, Sohum Shah, Anuja Sathe, Amit Sial, Dibyendu Bhattacharya and Pramod Pathak	18 September 2022	Maharani Season 2	
392	Tamannaah Bhatia, Riteish Deshmukh, Poonam Dhillon and Kusha Kapila	24 September 2022	Plan A Plan B	
393	Saif Ali Khan, Radhika Apte, Rohit Saraf, Yogita Bihani, Sharib Hashmi, Satyadeep Mishra and Pushkar–Gayathri	25 September 2022	Vikram Vedha	
394	Vikram, Trisha, Sobhita Dhulipala, Jayam Ravi and Karthi	1 October 2022	Ponniyin Selvan: I	
395	Himesh Reshammiya, Vishal Dadlani and Neha Kakkar	2 October 2022	Indian Idol (Season 13)	
396	Sunil Pal, Ahsaan Qureshi, Naveen Prabhakar, Vijay Ishwarlal Pawar, Khayali, Rajeev Thakur, Jayvijay Sachan, Rajat Sood, Rehman Khan, Rajeev Nigam and Suresh Albela	8 October 2022	Tribute to Late Raju Shrivastav	
397	Sunil Pal, Ahsaan Qureshi, Naveen Prabhakar, Vijay Ishwarlal Pawar, Khayali, Rajeev Thakur, Jayvijay Sachan, Rajat Sood, Rehman Khan, Rajeev Nigam and Suresh Albela	9 October 2022	Tribute to Late Raju Shrivastav	
398	Parineeti Chopra, Hardy Sandhu, Sharad Kelkar and Rajit Kapur	15 October 2022	Code Name: Tiranga	
399	Sameer Anjaan, Swanand Kirkire, Manoj Muntashir and Neelesh Misra	16 October 2022	Special appearance	
400	Ajay Devgn, Siddharth Malhotra, Rakul Preet Singh and Indra Kumar	22 October 2022	Thank God	
401	Yohani, Akriti Kakar, Sukhwinder Singh, Devi Sri Prasad, Mame Khan and Salim–Sulaiman	23 October 2022	Special appearance	
402	Sonakshi Sinha, Huma Qureshi, Mahat Raghavendra and Zaheer Iqbal	29 October 2022	Double XL	
403	Katrina Kaif, Siddhant Chaturvedi and Ishaan Khatter	30 October 2022	Phone Bhoot	
404	Anupam Kher, Boman Irani, Sarika and Neena Gupta	5 November 2022	Uunchai	
405	Janhvi Kapoor and Boney Kapoor	6 November 2022	Mili	
406	Aftab Sabri, Hashim Sabri, Khan Saab, Pervez Husan, Pervez Babloo and Shahrukh	12 November 2022	Special appearance	
407	Ajay Devgn, Shriya Saran, Tabu, Ishita Dutta and Mrunal Jadhav	13 November 2022	Drishyam 2	
408	Varun Dhawan, Kriti Sanon, Abhishek Banerjee, Deepak Dobriyal and Amar Kaushik	19 November 2022	Bhediya	
409	Ayushmann Khurana, Jaideep Ahlawat and Nora Fatehi	20 November 2022	An Action Hero	
410	Arbaaz Khan, Manav Vij, Sumit Kaul, Waluscha De Sousa and Sudhir Mishra	26 November 2022	Tanaav	
411	Udit Narayan, Deepa Narayan, Aditya Narayan, Shweta Agarwal Narayan	27 November 2022	Special appearance	
412	Kajol, Vishal Jethwa and Revathi	3 December 2022	Salaam Venky	
413	Shakti Kapoor, Asrani, Paintal and Tiku Talsania	4 December 2022	Special appearance	
414	Pavail Gulati, Saiyami Kher, Abhilash Thapliyal and Ashwiny Iyer Tiwari	10 December 2022	Faadu	
415	Badshah, Raftaar, King, Raja Kumari, Ikka Singh, Dino James and Srushti Tawade	11 December 2022	Special appearance	
416	Ranveer Singh, Pooja Hegde, Jacqueline Fernandez, Varun Sharma, Ashwini Kalsekar, Siddhartha Jadhav, Vijay Patkar, Vrajesh Hirjee, Tiku Talsania, Sulbha Arya, Anil Charanjeett and Rohit Shetty	17 December 2022	Cirkus	
417	Ranveer Singh, Pooja Hegde, Jacqueline Fernandez, Varun Sharma, Ashwini Kalsekar, Siddhartha Jadhav, Vijay Patkar, Vrajesh Hirjee, Tiku Talsania, Sulbha Arya, Anil Charanjeett and Rohit Shetty	18 December 2022	Cirkus	
418	Riteish Deshmukh, Genelia Deshmukh, Ajay-Atul and Shubhankar Tawde	24 December 2022	Ved	
419	Vicky Kaushal, Kiara Advani, Renuka Shahane, Viraj Ghelani and Shashank Khaitan	25 December 2022	Govinda Naam Mera	
420	Zakir Khan, Kusha Kapila, Anubhav Singh Bassi, Abhishek Upmanyu, Richa Sharma and Jasbir Jassi	31 December 2022	Special appearance	
421	Suneeta Rao, Shweta Shetty, Altaf Raja and Shabbir Kumar	7 January 2023	Special appearance	
422	Gaur Gopal Das, Khan Sir and Vivek Bindra	8 January 2023	Special appearance	
423	Vikas Khanna, Ranveer Brar and Garima Arora	14 January 2023	MasterChef India	
424	Satish Kaushik, Anees Bazmee and Indra Kumar	15 January 2023	Special appearance	
425	Neeru Bajwa, Satinder Sartaaj and Vijay Kumar Arora	21 January 2023	Kali Jotta	
426	Nawazuddin Siddiqui, Manoj Bajpayee, Huma Qureshi, Pankaj Tripathi, Piyush Mishra, Vineet Kumar, Varun Grover, Sneha Khanwalkar, Aditya Kumar, Zeishan Quadri and Anurag Kashyap	28 January 2023	10 years of Gangs of Wasseypur	
427	Alaya F and Karan Mehta	29 January 2023	Almost Pyaar with DJ Mohabbat	
428	Amit Jain, Anupam Mittal, Aman Gupta, Piyush Bansal, Vineeta Singh, Namita Thapar and Rahul Dua	4 February 2023	Shark Tank India	
429	Kartik Aaryan, Kriti Sanon, Rajpal Yadav and Ronit Roy	5 February 2023	Shehzada	
430	Guru Randhawa, Gurdas Maan and Yogita Bihani	11 February 2023	"Alone" music video	
431	Anupam Kher, Neena Gupta, Jugal Hansraj, Nargis Fakhri and Sharib Hashmi	12 February 2023	Shiv Shastri Balboa	
432	Sweta Singh, Anjana Om Kashyap and Chitra Tripathi	18 February 2023	Special appearance	
433	Sonu Sood, Sohail Khan, Manoj Tiwari, Binoo Dhillon, Ninja, Rajeev Pillai, Ganesh Kishan, Sudheer Babu and Jiiva	19 February 2023	Celebrity Cricket League	
434	Suniel Shetty, The Great Khali, Ali Budhawani, Mahavir Singh Phogat and Ritu Phogat	25 February 2023	Special appearance	
435	Akshay Kumar, Disha Patani, Nora Fatehi, Mouni Roy and Sonam Bajwa	26 February 2023	Special appearance	
436	Ranbir Kapoor, Shraddha Kapoor and Anubhav Singh Bassi	4 March 2023	Tu Jhoothi Main Makkaar	
437	Manoj Bajpayee, Sharmila Tagore, Suraj Sharma, Simran Bagga and Rahul Chittella	11 March 2023	Gulmohar	
438	Abdu Rozik, Shahana Goswami and Nandita Das	12 March 2023	Zwigato	
439	Rajkummar Rao, Bhumi Pednekar, Dia Mirza, Ashutosh Rana, Kritika Kamra and Anubhav Sinha	18 March 2023	Bheed	
440	Bhuvan Bam, MC Stan, Harsh Gujaral and Dolly Singh	19 March 2023	Special appearance	
441	Raj Babbar, Arya Babbar, Prateik Babbar and Juhi Babbar	25 March 2023	Special appearance	
442	Ajay Devgn, Tabu and Deepak Dobriyal	26 March 2023	Bholaa	
443	Geeta Kapoor, Terence Lewis, Sonali Bendre and Jay Bhanushali	1 April 2023	India's Best Dancer	
444	Aditya Roy Kapur, Mrunal Thakur, Deepak Kalra, Mithoon and Vishal Mishra	8 April 2023	Gumraah	
445	Suresh Raina, Priyanka Choudhary, Deepak Chahar, Jaya Bharadwaj, Aakash Chopra, Aakshi Mathur	9 April 2023	Special appearance	
446	Manisha Koirala and Mahima Chaudhry	15 April 2023	Special appearance	
447	Salman Khan, Pooja Hegde, Raghav Juyal, Shehnaaz Gill, Jassie Gill, Siddharth Nigam, Vinali Bhatnagar, Palak Tiwari and Sukhbir	16 April 2023	Kisi Ka Bhai Kisi Ki Jaan	
448	Sachin Pilgaonkar, Supriya Pilgaonkar and Shriya Pilgaonkar	22 April 2023	Special appearance	
449	Neeta Lulla, Dabboo Ratnani, Allan Amin, Aalim Hakim, Mickey Contractor and Ganesh Acharya	23 April 2023	Special appearance	
450	Bhagyashree, Aditi Govitrikar, Raima Sen, Hiten Tejwani, Samir Soni, Vibhu Kashyap and Gunjan Kuthiala	29 April 2023	NRI Wives	
451	Jimmy Shergill, Tigmanshu Dhulia, Brijendra Kala, Hrishita Bhatt, Varun Badola, Vyom Yadav, Anushka Kaushik and Jatin Goswami	30 April 2023	20 years of Haasil and Garmi	
452	Nawazuddin Siddiqui, Neha Sharma, Zarina Wahab, Mahaakshay Chakraborty, Nikhita Gandhi and Nakash Aziz	6 May 2023	Jogira Sara Ra Ra	
453	Ankita Lokhande, Divyanka Tripathi, Anita Hassanandani and Urvashi Dholakia	7 May 2023	Special appearance	
454	Jimmy Shergill, Raza Murad, Sayaji Shinde, Govind Namdeo, Abhimanyu Singh and Indraneil Sengupta	13 May 2023	Aazam	
455	Raveena Tandon, Sudha Murthy and Guneet Monga	14 May 2023	Special appearance	
456	Bellamkonda Sreenivas, Nushrratt Bharuccha, Bhagyashree, Karan Singh Chabbra, Palak Muchhal and V. V. Vinayak	20 May 2023	Chatrapathi	
457	Mandakini, Sangeeta Bijlani and Varsha Usgaonkar	21 May 2023	Special appearance	
458	Rema, Shankar Mahadevan, Siddharth Mahadevan, Shivam Mahadevan, Shaan, Akriti Kakar, Sukriti Kakar, Prakriti Kakar, Nirmal Kakar, Romy, Shashwat Sachdev and Nikhita Gandhi	27 May 2023	Big Band Theory Season 2	
459	Kabir Bedi, Pooja Bedi and Alaya F	28 May 2023	Special appearance	
460	Vicky Kaushal and Sara Ali Khan	3 June 2023	Zara Hatke Zara Bachke	
461	Brett Lee and Chris Gayle	4 June 2023	Special appearance	
462	RJ Malishka, RJ Naved, RJ Anmol, RJ Anuragha and RJ Jeeturaaj	10 June 2023	Special appearance	
463	Gippy Grewal, Sonam Bajwa, Kavita Kaushik, Gurpreet Ghuggi, Binnu Dhillon, Jaswinder Bhalla, Naresh Kathooria and Smeep Kang	11 June 2023	Carry on Jatta 3	
464	Mukesh Chhabra, Tridha Choudhury, Anchal Singh, Amit Sial, Rajesh Tailang and Sumeet Vyas	17 June 2023	Special appearance	
465	Anand–Milind, Sameer Anjaan, Udit Narayan, Salman Ali, Sayali Kamble, Ashish Kulkarni and Rishi Singh	18 June 2023	Special appearance	
466	Kartik Aaryan, Kiara Advani, Supriya Pathak, Gajraj Rao, Shikha Talsania, Siddharth Randeria and Anuradha Patel	24 June 2023	Satyaprem Ki Katha	
467	Mehshar Afridi, Azhar Iqbal, Shabbir Ahmed, Sayeed Quadri, Faaiz Anwar and A. M. Turaz	1 July 2023	Special appearance	
468	Reena Roy and Moushumi Chatterjee	2 July 2023	Special appearance	
469	Renuka Shahane, Mini Mathur, Parizaad Kolah, Richa Anirudh and Deepti Bhatnagar	8 July 2023	Special appearance	
470	Sunny Deol and Ameesha Patel	16 July 2023	Gadar 2	
471	Anil Kapoor, Aditya Roy Kapur, Sobhita Dhulipala, Tillotama Shome, Ravi Behl and Arjun Bijlani	22 July 2023	The Night Manager and India's Got Talent	
472	Anil Kapoor, Aditya Roy Kapur, Sobhita Dhulipala, Tillotama Shome, Ravi Behl and Arjun Bijlani	23 July 2023	The Night Manager and India's Got Talent	

== Controversy ==
On 31 August 2017, the spokesperson of Sony Entertainment Television announced that Kapil Sharma and the channel have mutually agreed to give the show a short break as the shooting of several episodes had to be cancelled in the past few days due to Sharma's poor health. The show started losing TRP post Sharma's mid-air altercation with co-star Sunil Grover. After that, his health started deteriorating which made him skip the show for a couple of episodes. After the controversy, Grover left the show along with Chandan Prabhakar, Ali Asgar and some other cast members. Prabhakar returned to the show along with Bharti Singh appearing in recurring episodes. The show went off air in 2017. The second season took to the telecast in December 2018. Singh and Krushna Abhishek joined the show as new cast.

The show was also in controversy when film director Vivek Agnihotri said that the star cast of his movie The Kashmir Files was not invited to the show because the film does not have a commercial star cast. Later, film actor Anupam Kher, who starred in the film, denied allegations of Vivek Agnihotri.

== Reception ==
The Kapil Sharma Show's first season received a mixed reception from critics and audiences. Namrata Thakker of Rediff.com gave it 2.5 stars out of 5 stars, liking the characters of Sunil Grover and Ali Asgar but saying that "the series has big shoes to fill considering how successful their earlier show Comedy Nights With Kapil was." Chaya Unnikrishnan of Daily News and Analysis gave the series two stars out of five but said, "Kapil Sharma's wit and funny one-liners bring a laugh". Although she praised part of the show ("In fact, the 10 minutes or so where [Sharma] has a monologue is the best part of the show"), Unnikrishnan called it "dull and disappointing". In her 1.5-star review, Letty Mariam Abraham of Mid-Day said: "The whole look and feel of the new set is interesting, even if the jokes are old". However, "Kapil brings nothing new to the plate and it seems like a waste of the prime time slot." The season 2 of the show got a favourable opening according Broadcast Audience Research Council ratings, with 8.1 million impressions.

=== Viewer response ===
According to the reports published by the Broadcast Audience Research Council, the show's first episode of the show generated 8,943 responses. Although, some viewers were happy to see the same contestants back after watching Comedy Nights with Kapil, others were disappointed with the show's repetitive humour and chaos. The series' 16th episode, featuring the Sairat team and airing on 12 June 2016, had better ratings in the non-fiction category.

== Awards ==
Year	Award	Category	Recipients	Ref
2020	Producers Guild Film Awards	Best Comedy Show	The Kapil Sharma Show	
2020	Indian Television Academy Awards	Best Comedy Show	The Kapil Sharma Show	
2020	Indian Television Academy Awards	Best Director - Comedy	Bharat Kukreti	
2020	Indian Television Academy Awards	Best Actor in a Comic Role	Kiku Sharda	
2020	Indian Television Academy Awards	Best Actor in a Comic Role	Krushna Abhishek	
2020	Indian Television Academy Awards	Best Actress in a Comic Role	Bharti Singh	
2020	Indian Television Academy Awards	Comedy Genius	Kapil Sharma	
