= Anubhav Singh Bassi =

Indian stand-up comedian and YouTuber

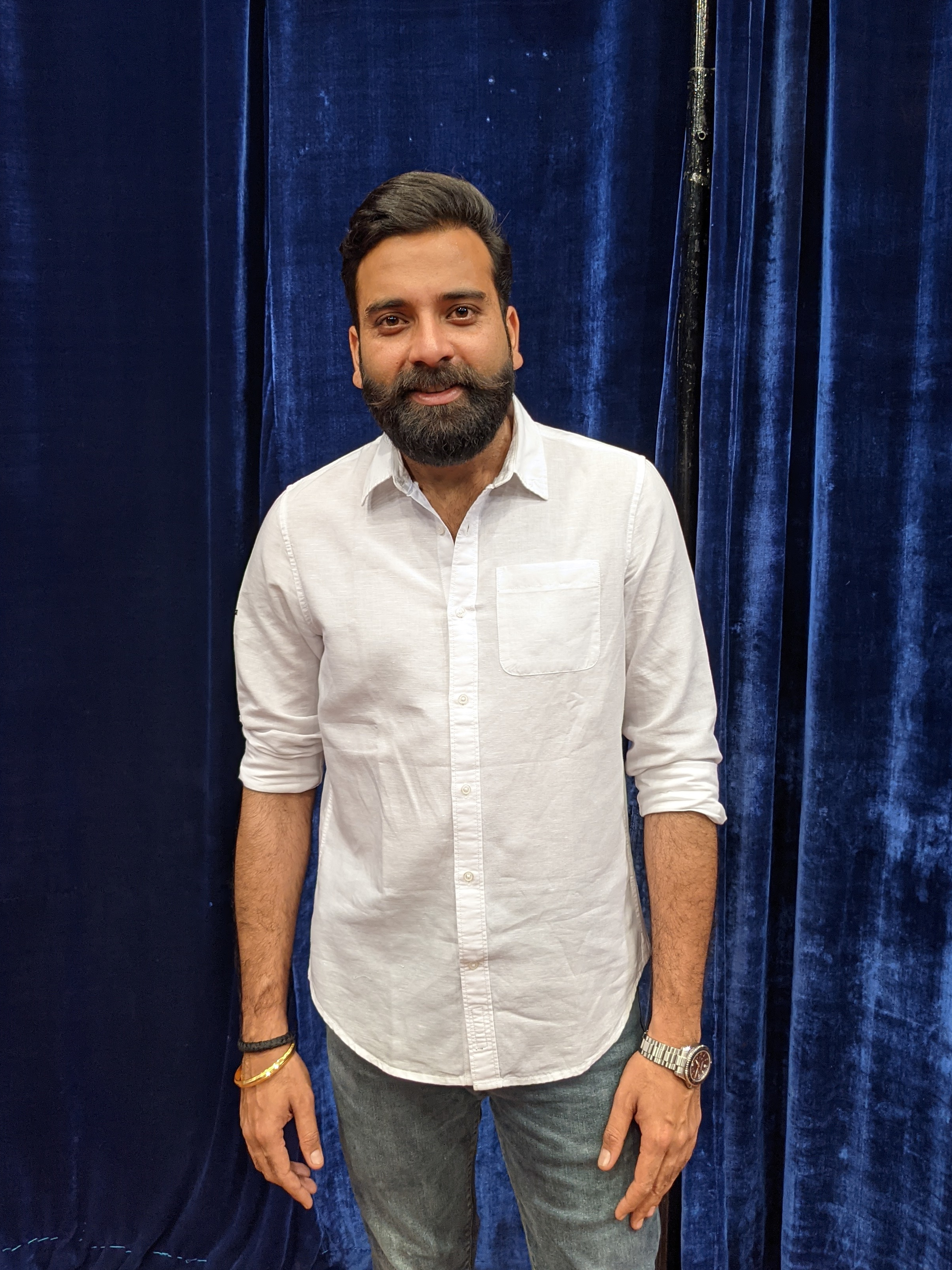
- Bassi in Surat in 2022
- Born: 9 January 1991 (age 35); Meerut, Uttar Pradesh, India
- Education: RMLNLU
- Occupations: Comedian; YouTuber; Actor
- Years active: 2017–present
- Organization: Oriole Entertainment

YouTube information
- Channels: Anubhav Singh Bassi; be_a_bassi
- Genre: Stand-up comedy
- Subscribers: 5.28 million (main channel); 6 million (combined); (Note: Subscribers, broken down by channel: 5.28 million (Anubhav Singh Bassi) 1.51 million (be_a_bassi))
- Views: 486 million (main channel); 793 million (combined) (Note: Views, broken down by channel: 486 million (Anubhav Singh Bassi) 307 million (be_a_bassi))
- Last updated: 9 November 2026

Anubhav Singh Bassi is an Indian actor, YouTuber and stand-up comedian. His career as a standup comic started after an open mic in 2017. Bassi's stand-up videos on YouTube have garnered over 200 million views.

== Early life and career ==
Bassi was born and raised in Parikshitgarh in Uttar Pradesh. He pursued his BA LLB from Lucknow’s National Law University.

He did a monologue for Amazon Funnies, and a cameo in ZEE5's Comedy Couple (2020). He also delivered a Ted Talk about his struggles.

In January 2023, Bassi made his Hindi film debut with Luv Ranjan's Tu Jhoothi Main Makkaar alongside Ranbir Kapoor and Shraddha Kapoor, which got released in March 2023. He released his first stand-up special, Bas Kar Bassi on Amazon Prime Video in February 2023. Later that year, he toured India with his show Kisi Ko Batana Mat, performing in cities including Delhi, Mumbai, Jaipur, Kolkata and Bengaluru.

In 2026, he became the first Indian stand-up comedian to reach 100 million views on a video on YouTube.

== Filmography ==
=== Films ===
Year	Film	Role	Notes
2020	Comedy Couple	Himself	cameo appearance
2022	The Kapil Sharma Show	Guest	
2023	The Kapil Sharma Show	Guest	
2023	Tu Jhoothi Main Makkaar	Manu Dabbas	
2025	Kaun Banega Crorepati	Contestant	
2026	The Great Indian Kapil Show	Guest	

=== Web series ===
Year	Title	Role	Platform	Notes
2023	Bas Kar Bassi	Himself	Amazon Prime Video	Stand-up comedy
