= Comedy Nights with Kapil =

Indian TV comedy show (2013–2016)

- Genre: Sketch comedy
- Presented by: Kapil Sharma
- Country of origin: India
- Original language: Hindi
- No. of seasons: 1
- No. of episodes: 191

Production
- Executive producer: Preeti Simoes
- Producer: Kapil Sharma
- Production location: Film City, Mumbai
- Camera setup: Multi-camera
- Running time: 65 minutes
- Production companies: K9 Productions; SOL Production; Frames Production Company

Original release
- Network: Colors TV
- Release: 22 June 2013 – 24 January 2016

Comedy Nights With Kapil is an Indian Hindi-language sketch comedy and celebrity talk show hosted and produced by comedian Kapil Sharma. It was on-air on Colors TV amid 22 June 2013 to 24 January 2016. Many of the episodes feature celebrity guests who usually appear to promote their latest films in a comedy-focused talk show format. On 25 September 2013, a fire broke out on the sets of the show at Film City in Goregaon causing the entire set to collapse and an estimated loss of ₹200 million (equivalent to ₹370 million or US$3.9 million in 2026). Following the fire, two episodes were shot on sets of Bigg Boss in Lonavla. In September 2013, the show became India's highest rated scripted TV show. At the CNN-IBN Indian of the Year awards, Sharma was awarded the Entertainer of the Year award for 2013.

After a successful run of three years, Kapil Sharma decided to end the show after creative differences with the Colors TV. The last episode aired on 24 January 2016. In August 2016, Colors re-telecast old episodes of the show in their Sunday afternoon time slots due to low target rating points besides stiff competition with Kapil.

The show is adapted in Kannada as Majaa Talkies and hosted by Srujan Lokesh. This show is aired on Colors Kannada, the Kannada Channel owned by Colors TV.

== Cast ==
=== Main ===
- Kapil Sharma as Host / Bittu Sharma / Sittu / Kapil / Inspector Shamsher Singh/ Various Characters
- Navjot Singh Sidhu as permanent guest
- Ali Asgar as Dolly Sharma / Chinky Sharma Dadi
- Sumona Chakravarti as Manju Sharma, Bittu's wife
- Upasana Singh as Pinky Sharma
- Sunil Grover as Gutthi / Khairatilal / Kapil's father in law / Various characters
- Kiku Sharda as Palak / Lachha / Pankhudi / Pam /various characters
- Chandan Prabhakar as Raju / Chadda uncle
- Paresh Ganatra as Kapil's brother-in-law / Various characters
- Roshni Chopra as Various characters
- Naveen Bawa as Various characters
- Atul Parchure as Various characters
- Sugandha Mishra as Bittu's sister-in-law/various characters

=== Recurring ===
- Naseem Vicky as Ramu / Various characters
- Vishal Singh as Mango Crorepati
- Rajiv Thakur as Various characters
- Razzak Khan as Golden Bhai
- Krishna Bhatt as various characters
- Gaurav Gera as Dulari
- Raju Srivastava as beautician Rosie / various characters
- Akshat Singh as Dhamaka
- Soni Singh as Bittu's secretary
- Rahul Mahajan as Nawab Pandey
- Parvati Sehgal as various characters.

=== Guest ===
No.	Guest(s)	Telecast date	Featured promotion
1	Dharmendra	22 June 2013	Promotion of Yamla Pagla Deewana 2.
2	Vidya Balan and Emraan Hashmi	23 June 2013	Promotion of Ghanchakkar
3	Sonakshi Sinha and Ranveer Singh	29 June 2013	Promotion of Lootera
4	Suniel Shetty and Johnny Lever	30 June 2013	Promotion of Enemmy
5	Shah Rukh Khan, Deepika Padukone and Rohit Shetty	6 July 2013	Promotion of Chennai Express.
5	Shah Rukh Khan, Deepika Padukone and Rohit Shetty	7 July 2013	Promotion of Chennai Express.
6	Gaurav Gera as Mrs. Pammi Pyarelal; Prabhudeva and Girish Kumar	13 July 2013	Promotion of Mrs. Pammi Pyarelal; Promotion of Ramaiya Vastavaiya
7	Huma Qureshi and Nawazuddin Siddiqui	14 July 2013	Promotion of Shorts
8	Irrfan Khan and Arjun Rampal	20 July 2013	Promotion of D-Day
9	Tusshar Kapoor and Ravi Kishan	21 July 2013	Promotion of Bajatey Raho
10	Kirron Kher	27 July 2013	Special appearance
11	Tina Dutta and Avika Gor	28 July 2013	Special appearance
12	Shahrukh Khan and Rohit Shetty	3 August 2013	Promotion of Chennai Express
13	The Smurfs; Mika Singh	4 August 2013	Promotion of The Smurfs 2 and special appearance
14	Akshay Kumar, Sonakshi Sinha and Imran Khan	10 August 2013	Promotion of Once Upon a Time in Mumbaai Dobara
15	Anu Malik	11 August 2013	Special appearance
16	Riteish Deshmukh, Aftab Shivdasani and Vivek Oberoi	17 August 2013	Promotion of Grand Masti
17	Ranjeet, Nikitin Dheer and Prem Chopra	18 August 2013	Special appearance
18	Ajay Devgan and Prakash Jha	24 August 2013	Promotion of Satyagraha
19	Usha Nadkarni, Renuka Israni and Smita Bansal	25 August 2013	Special appearance
20	Ram Charan and Priyanka Chopra	31 August 2013	Promotion of Zanjeer
21	Sushant Singh Rajput, Parineeti Chopra and Vaani Kapoor	1 September 2013	Promotion of Shuddh Desi Romance
22	Juhi Chawla	7 September 2013	Special appearance
23	Shahid Kapoor, Ileana D'Cruz and Neha Kakkar	8 September 2013	Promotion of Phata Poster Nikhla Hero
24	Ranbir Kapoor and Pallavi Sharda	21 September 2013	Promotion of Besharam
25	Anil Kapoor	22 September 2013	Promotion of 24
26	Sunidhi Chauhan	28 September 2013	Special appearance
27	Soha Ali Khan and Javed Jaffrey	29 September 2013	Promotion of War Chhod Na Yaar
28	Kangana Ranaut	6 October 2013	Promotion of Rajjo
29	Akshay Kumar, Ronit Roy, Shiv Panditt and Aditi Rao Hydari	13 October 2013	Promotion of Boss
30	Farah Khan	20 October 2013	Special appearance
31	Sonu Nigam	27 October 2013	Special appearance
32	Hrithik Roshan	3 November 2013	Promotion of Krrish 3
33	Ranveer Singh and Deepika Padukone	10 November 2013	Promotion of Goliyon Ki Raasleela Ram-Leela
34	Sunny Deol and Amrita Rao	17 November 2013	Promotion of Singh Saab The Great
35	Imran Khan and Kareena Kapoor Khan	24 November 2013	Promotion of Gori Tere Pyaar Mein
36	Saif Ali Khan	1 December 2013	Promotion of Bullett Raja
37	Shahid Kapoor, Sonakshi Sinha, Sonu Sood and Prabhudeva	8 December 2013	Promotion of R... Rajkumar
38	Govinda and Puja Banerjee	15 December 2013	Promotion of the album Gori Tere Naina
39	Sania Mirza	22 December 2013	Special appearance
40	Arshad Warsi and Soha Ali Khan	4 January 2014	Promotion of Mr Joe B. Carvalho
41	Hema Malini	5 January 2014	Promotion of Sholay 3D
42	Madhuri Dixit and Huma Qureshi	11 January 2014	Promotion of Dedh Ishqiya
43	Divya Khosla Kumar, Rakul Preet Singh, Himansh Kohli, Nicole Faria, Shreyas Porus Pardiwalla and Devanshu Sharma; Raveena Tandon	12 January 2014	Promotion of Yaariyan; Special appearance
44	Salman Khan	18 January 2014	Promotion of Jai Ho
45	Salman Khan, Sohail Khan and Daisy Shah	19 January 2014	Promotion of Jai Ho
46	Bipasha Basu	25 January 2014	Promotion of her fitness DVD Unleash
47	Shekhar Suman, Adhyayan Suman and Ariana Ayam	26 January 2014	Promotion of Heartless
48	Parineeti Chopra and Sidharth Malhotra	1 February 2014	Promotion of Hasee Toh Phasee
49	Daler Mehndi	2 February 2014	Special appearance
50	Ravi Kishan, Manoj Tiwari and Nirahua	8 February 2014	Promotion of 2014 Celebrity Cricket League: Bhojpuri Dabanggs
51	Priyanka Chopra, Ranveer Singh and Arjun Kapoor	9 February 2014	Promotion of Gunday
52	Diljit Dosanjh, Ravi Dubey, Sargun Mehta, Sidharth Shukla and Karan Wahi	15 February 2014	Special appearance
53	Lauren Gottlieb; Farhan Akhtar and Vidya Balan	16 February 2014	Special appearance • Promotion of Shaadi Ke Side Effects.
54	Randeep Hooda, Alia Bhatt and Imtiaz Ali	22 February 2014	Promotion of Highway
55	Malaika Arora Khan and Kirron Kher	23 February 2014	Promotion of India's Got Talent
56	Ali Zafar and Yami Gautam	1 March 2014	Promotion of Total Siyapaa
57	Madhuri Dixit and Juhi Chawla	2 March 2014	Promotion of Gulaab Gang
58	Kangana Ranaut and Rajkummar Rao	9 March 2014	Promotion of Queen
59	Kailash Kher, Remo D'souza, Terence Lewis and Mouni Roy	15 March 2014	Special appearance & Holi special episode
60	Mugdha Godse and Nikitin Dheer; Ayushmann Khurrana and Sonam Kapoor	16 March 2014	Promotion of Fear Factor: Khatron Ke Khiladi; Promotion of Bewakoofiyaan
61	Ekta Kapoor and Sunny Leone	22 March 2014	Promotion of Ragini MMS 2
62	Shilpa Shetty, Harman Baweja and Raj Kundra	23 March 2014	Promotion of Dishkiyaoon.
63	Varun Dhawan, Ileana D'Cruz and David Dhawan	29 March 2014	Promotion of Main Tera Hero
64	Pulkit Samrat, Bilal Amrohi and Atul Agnihotri; Jwala Gutta; Vijender Singh	30 March 2014	Promotion of O Teri; Special appearance Promotion of Fugly
65	Amitabh Bachchan, Boman Irani and Parth Bhalerao	5 April 2014	Promotion of Bhoothnath Returns
66	Amitabh Bachchan and Boman Irani	6 April 2014	Promotion of Bhoothnath Returns
67	Rajat Sharma	12 April 2014	Special appearance
68	Jeetendra and Tusshar Kapoor	13 April 2014	Special appearance
69	Gurdas Maan	19 April 2014	Promotion of Dil Vil Pyaar Vyaar
70	Subhash Ghai, Mithun Chakraborty, Kartik Tiwari and Mishti	20 April 2014	Promotion of Kaanchi
71	Sunil Gavaskar and Virender Sehwag	26 April 2014	Special appearance
72	Alia Bhatt, Amrita Singh and Arjun Kapoor	27 April 2014	Celebration of success of 2 States
73	Hawaa Hawaai cast Vivek Oberoi	3 May 2014	Promotion of Hawaa Hawaai; Promotion of The Amazing Spider-Man 2
74	Sushmita Sen	4 May 2014	Promotion of her fitness studio
75	Tiger Shroff, Jackie Shroff and Kriti Sanon	10 May 2014	Promotion of Heropanti
76	Vinod Khanna and Sunil Shetty	11 May 2014	Promotion of Koyelaanchal
77	Alok Nath and Toral Rasputra	17 May 2014	Special appearance
78	Kapil Dev	18 May 2014	Special appearance
79	Meet Bros Anjjan, Kanika Kapoor, Tochi Raina and Neeti Mohan; Sukhwinder Singh	24 May 2014	Special appearance Promotion of Jhalak Dikhhla Jaa
80	Alka Yagnik and Kumar Sanu	25 May 2014	Special appearance
81	Akshay Kumar, Vipul Shah and Freddy Daruwala	31 May 2014	Promotion of Holiday
82	Sonali Raut, Zoya Afroz and Himesh Reshammiya	1 June 2014	Celebration of success of The Xposé
83	Drashti Dhami; Sonakshi Sinha	8 June 2014	Promotion of Jhalak Dikhhla Jaa; Promotion of Holiday
84	Saif Ali Khan, Riteish Deshmukh, Ram Kapoor and Sajid Khan	14 June 2014	Promotion of Humshakals
85	Saif Ali Khan, Riteish Deshmukh, Ram Kapoor, Sajid Khan, Esha Gupta and Tamannaah	15 June 2014	Promotion of Humshakals
86	Yuvraj Singh and Harbhajan Singh	21 June 2014	Special appearance
87	Armaan Jain, Deeksha Seth and Karisma Kapoor	22 June 2014	Promotion of Lekar Hum Deewana Dil
88	Vidya Balan and Dia Mirza	28 June 2014	Promotion of Bobby Jasoos
89	Shraddha Kapoor, Sidharth Malhotra, Riteish Deshmukh and Mohit Suri	29 June 2014	Promotion of Ek Villain
90	Sanjeev Kapoor and Vikas Khanna	5 July 2014	Promotion of Smile Foundation
91	Yo Yo Honey Singh	6 July 2014	Special appearance
92	Alia Bhatt, Varun Dhawan, and Karan Johar	12 July 2014	Promotion of Humpty Sharma Ki Dulhania
93	Alia Bhatt, Varun Dhawan, Karan Johar and Sidharth Shukla	13 July 2014	Promotion of Humpty Sharma Ki Dulhania
94	Irfan Pathan and Yusuf Pathan	19 July 2014	Special appearance
95	Virat Kohli	20 July 2014	Special appearance
96	Fawad Afzal Khan and Sonam Kapoor	26 July 2014	Promotion of Khoobsurat
97	Dharmendra, Poonam Dhillon and Gippy Grewal	27 July 2014	Promotion of Double Di Trouble
98	Anupam Kher	2 August 2014	Special appearance
99	Ajay Devgan and Kareena Kapoor Khan	3 August 2014	Promotion of Singham Returns
100	Akshay Kumar, Sonu Sood, Johny Lever, Mithun Chakraborty and Tamannaah	9 August 2014	Promotion of Entertainment
101	Salim Merchant and Sulaiman Merchant	10 August 2014	Special appearance
102	Rani Mukerji	16 August 2014	Promotion of Mardaani
103	Priyanka Chopra and Omung Kumar	17 August 2014	Promotion of Mary Kom
104	Emraan Hashmi and Humaima Malick	23 August 2014	Promotion of Raja Natwarlal
105	Shraddha Kapoor, Shahid Kapoor and Vishal Bhardwaj	24 August 2014	Promotion of Haider
106	Neha Sharma and Rakhi Sawant	30 August 2014	Special appearance
107	Ajay Jadeja and Krishnamachari Srikkanth	31 August 2014	Special appearance
108	Udit Narayan and Aditya Narayan	6 September 2014	Special appearance
109	Deepika Padukone and Arjun Kapoor	7 September 2014	Promotion of Finding Fanny
110	Bipasha Basu, Imran Abbas Naqvi and Vikram Bhatt	13 September 2014	Promotion of Creature 3D
111	Parineeti Chopra and Aditya Roy Kapur	14 September 2014	Promotion of Daawat-e-Ishq
112	Bipasha Basu and Imran Abbas Naqvi (Note: This episode was shot in Dubai)	27 September 2014	Promotion of Creature 3D
113	Mika Singh and Shaan	28 September 2014	Promotion of Balwinder Singh Famous Ho Gaya
114	Falguni Pathak, Shahid Kapoor, Tabu and Kay Kay Menon	4 October 2014	Promotion of Haider
115	Sonu Nigam; Nikhil Dwivedi	5 October 2014	Special appearance Promotion of Tamanchey
116	Randhir Kapoor, Sharman Joshi, Shweta Kumar and Rekha	11 October 2014	Promotion of Super Nani
117	Rekha	12 October 2014	Promotion of Super Nani
118	Shah Rukh Khan, Abhishek Bachchan, Boman Irani, Sonu Sood, Deepika Padukone, Vivaan Shah and Farah Khan	18 October 2014	Promotion of Happy New Year
118	Shah Rukh Khan, Abhishek Bachchan, Boman Irani, Sonu Sood, Deepika Padukone, Vivaan Shah and Farah Khan	19 October 2014	Promotion of Happy New Year
118	Shah Rukh Khan, Abhishek Bachchan, Boman Irani, Sonu Sood, Vivaan Shah and Farah Khan	25 October 2014	Promotion of Happy New Year
119	Vishal Dadlani and Shekhar Ravjiani	26 October 2014	Special appearance
120	Wasim Akram	1 November 2014	Special appearance
121	Sunil Pal; Lisa Haydon, Anupam Kher, Annu Kapoor and Piyush Mishra	2 November 2014	Promotion of Money Back Guarantee; Promotion of The Shaukeens
122	Govinda, Ranveer Singh, Ali Zafar and Parineeti Chopra	8 November 2014	Promotion of Kill Dil
123	Saina Nehwal	9 November 2014	Special appearance
124	Govinda, Saif Ali Khan, Ileana D'Cruz and Kalki Koechlin	15 November 2014	Promotion of Happy Ending
125	Ranbir Kapoor, Syed Rahim Nabi and Tiago Ribeiro	16 November 2014	Promotion of Mumbai City FC
126	Adil Hussain and Mona Singh; Shivansh Kotia, Aryan, Kautilya Pandit, Amrita Mukherjee, Delisa, Sirat and Ruhanika Dhawan	22 November 2014	Promotion of Zed Plus; Special appearance (child artists)
127	Hariharan and Rekha Bhardwaj	23 November 2014	Special appearance
128	Ajay Devgan, Kunaal Roy Kapur, Prabhudeva, Remo D'souza, Sonakshi Sinha and Manasvi Mamgai	29 November 2014	Promotion of Action Jackson
129	Ishant Sharma and Shikhar Dhawan	30 November 2014	Special appearance
130	Atif Aslam	6 December 2014	Special appearance
132	Chetan Bhagat	7 December 2014	Special appearance
133	Shah Rukh Khan and Kajol	13 December 2014	Celebration of 1000 weeks of DDLJ
134	Shah Rukh Khan, Anupam Kher, Kajol, Farida Jalal, Mandira Bedi and Pooja Ruparel	14 December 2014	Celebration of 1000 weeks of DDLJ
135	Anil Kapoor	20 December 2014	Special appearance
136	Mallika Sherawat	21 December 2014	Special appearance
137	Bigg Boss Crossover	27 December 2014	Special appearance
138	Karan Singh Grover and Bipasha Basu	28 December 2014	Promotion of Alone
139	Sonakshi Sinha, Arjun Kapoor, Manoj Bajpayee & Sanjay Kapoor	4 January 2015	Promotion of Tevar
139	Akshay Kumar, Rana Daggubati and Taapsee Pannu	10 January 2015	Promotion of Baby
140	Arbaaz Khan, Malaika Arora Khan, Sonam Kapoor, Archana Puran Singh & Rajkummar Rao	18 January 2015	Promotion of Dolly Ki Doli
142	Ayushmann Khurrana and Mithun Chakraborty	25 January 2015	Promotion of Hawaizaada
143	Arjun Rampal and Jacqueline Fernandez	1 February 2015	Promotion of Roy
144	Amitabh Bachchan, Dhanush, Akshara Haasan and R. Balki	8 February 2015	Promotion of Shamitabh
145	Cast of daily soaps aired on Colors TV	15 February 2015	Special appearance
146	Farah Khan and Sajid Khan	22 February 2015	Promotion of Farah Ki Daawat
147	Harbhajan Singh and Shoaib Akhtar	1 March 2015	Special appearance
149	Anushka Sharma and Neil Bhoopalam	8 March 2015	Promotion of NH10
150	Various television actors Altaf Raja and Vikas Bahl	15 March 2015	"Kapil Ki Shaadi" Special appearance Promotion of Hunterrr
151	Anu Malik and Kumar Sanu	22 March 2015	Special appearance
152	Various characters Sushant Singh Rajput and Anand Tiwari	29 March 2015	Cricket Special; Promotion of Detective Byomkesh Bakshy!
153	Sunny Leone and Jay Bhanushali	5 April 2015	Promotion of Ek Paheli Leela
154	Emraan Hashmi, Mahesh Bhatt, Vikram Bhatt and Amyra Dastur	12 April 2015	Promotion of Mr. X
155	Revathi and Kalki Koechlin	19 April 2015	Promotion of Margarita With A Straw
156	Shruti Haasan and Akshay Kumar	26 April 2015	Promotion of Gabbar is Back
157	Rannvijay Singh, Karan Kundra, Vijender Singh and Esha Deol; Mahaakshay Chakraborty, Evelyn Sharma, and Mohit Dutta	3 May 2015	Promotion of Roadies X2; Promotion of Ishqedarriyaan
158	Deepika Padukone, Irrfan Khan and Shoojit Sircar	10 May 2015	Promotion of Piku
159	Tiger Shroff and Ahmed Khan	17 May 2015	Promotion of video song Zindagi Aa Raha Hoon Main
160	Madhuri Dixit; Arshad Warsi, Jackky Bhagnani and Lauren Gottlieb	24 May 2015	Promotion of Dance with Madhuri; Promotion of Welcome to Karachi
161	Ranveer Singh, Anil Kapoor and Anushka Sharma	31 May 2015	Promotion of Dil Dhadakne Do
162	Ranveer Singh, Anil Kapoor, Priyanka Chopra, Zoya Akhtar & Shefali Shah	7 June 2015	Promotion of Dil Dhadakne Do
163	Varun Dhawan, Shraddha Kapoor, Prabhu Deva & Remo D'souza	14 June 2015	Promotion of ABCD 2
164	The Great Khali	21 June 2015	Special appearance
165	Gippy Grewal, Dharmendra & Geeta Basra	28 June 2015	Promotion of Second Hand Husband
166	Salman Khan	12 July 2015	Promotion of Bajrangi Bhaijaan
167	Salman Khan & Nawazuddin Siddiqui	19 July 2015	Promotion of Bajrangi Bhaijaan
168	Ajay Devgan, Shriya Saran & Tabu (Note: This episode was hosted by Arshad Warsi.)	26 July 2015	Promotion of Drishyam
169	Riteish Deshmukh & Pulkit Samrat (Note: This episode was hosted by Sajid Khan)	2 August 2015	Promotion of Bangistan
170	Kapil Sharma's comeback episode	9 August 2015	
171	Abhishek Bachchan, Rishi Kapoor & Supriya Pathak	16 August 2015	Promotion of All Is Well
172	Abhishek Bachchan, Rishi Kapoor, Asin & Umesh Shukla	23 August 2015	Promotion of All Is Well
173	Anil Kapoor, John Abraham & Shruti Haasan	30 August 2015	Welcome Back
174	Suresh Raina & Sushil Kumar	6 September 2015	Special appearance
175	Gauhar Khan	13 September 2015	Special appearance
176	Elli Avram, Simran Kaur Mundi, Manjari Fadnis, Sai Lokur, Arbaaz Khan, Abbas–Mustan & Dr Zeus	20 September 2015	Promotion of Kis Kisko Pyaar Karoon
177	Akshay Kumar, Amy Jackson & Prabhu Deva	27 September 2015	Promotion of Singh Is Bliing
178	Aishwarya Rai, Irrfan Khan & Sanjay Gupta	4 October 2015	Promotion of Jazbaa
179	Shahid Kapoor & Alia Bhatt	18 October 2015	Promotion of Shandaar
180	Sania Mirza	25 October 2015	Special appearance
181	Salman Khan & Sonam Kapoor	1 November 2015	Promotion of Prem Ratan Dhan Payo
182	Salman Khan & Sonam Kapoor	8 November 2015	Promotion of Prem Ratan Dhan Payo
183	Ankit Tiwari, Kanika Kapoor & Badshah	15 November 2015	Special appearance
184	Ranbir Kapoor & Deepika Padukone	22 November 2015	Promotion of Tamasha
185	Shilpa Shetty; Sharman Joshi, Karan Singh Grover, Zarine Khan & Daisy Shah	29 November 2015	Special appearance Promotion of Hate Story 3
186	Harbhajan Singh & Geeta Basra	6 December 2015	Special appearance
187	Ranveer Singh, Deepika Padukone	13 December 2015	Promotion of Bajirao Mastani
188	Shah Rukh Khan, Kajol, Varun Dhawan, Kriti Sanon, Johnny Lever & Varun Sharma	20 December 2015	Promotion of Dilwale
189	Priyanka Chopra	27 December 2015	Promotion of Bajirao Mastani
190	Sunny Deol, Soha Ali Khan & Tisca Chopra	3 January 2016	Promotion of Ghayal Once Again
191	Akshay Kumar & Nimrat Kaur	24 January 2016	Promotion of Airlift

== Incident ==
On 3 April 2014, an audience scam was exposed of this show, when a NRI lady revealed to that she paid 8,000 rupees to see show, Preeti Simoes, this show's executive producer said some freelance coordinator did the scam with multiple people and their shows audience isn't paid but they select random people on Facebook and Twitter and invite them for shows shoot.

== Awards ==
Year	Awards	Category	Recipient(s)	Result	Refs
2013	ITA Awards 2013	Best Actor – Comedy	Kapil Sharma	Won	
2013	ITA Awards 2013	Best Serial – Comedy	Comedy Nights with Kapil	Won	
2013	ITA Awards 2013	Best Actor - Supporting Role	Ali Asgar	Won	
2013	CNN-IBN Indian of the Year	Entertainer of the Year	Kapil Sharma	Won	
