= Popular Meeruthi =

Indian poet

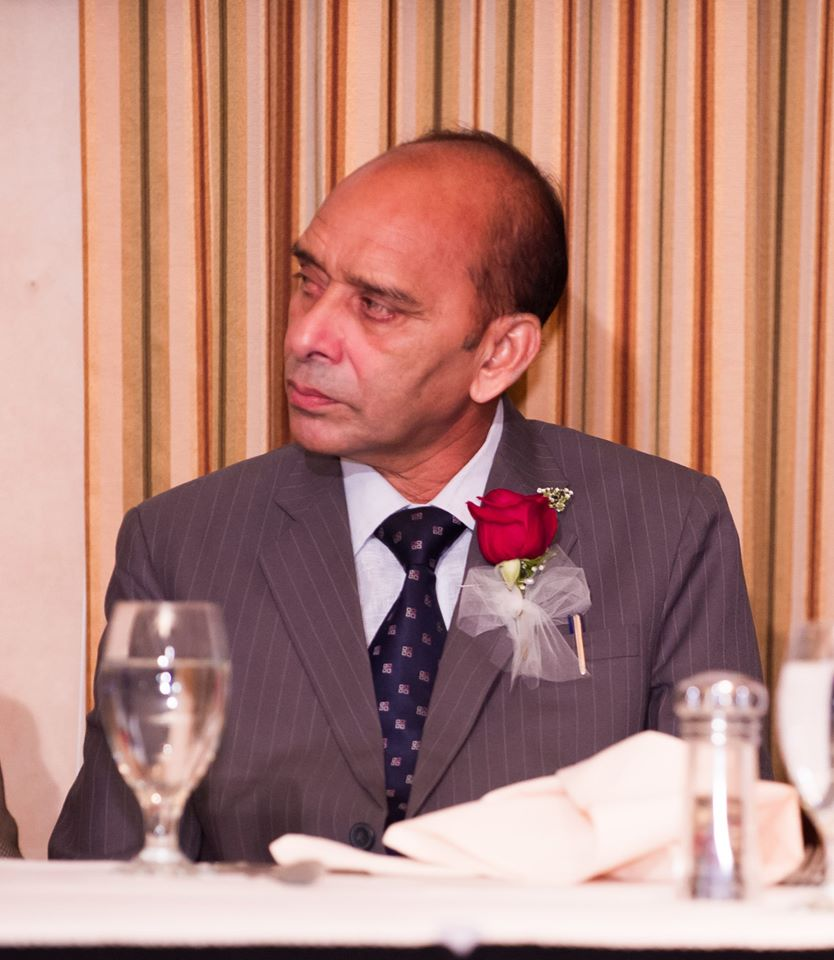
- Born: Syed Aijazuddin Shah; 9 August 1953 (age 73); Meerut, Uttar Pradesh, India
- Education: MA, PhD in Urdu Chaudhary Charan Singh University
- Alma mater: FAIZ-E-AAM Inter college, Meerut
- Occupation: Poet
- Spouse: Syeda Rashda Shah
- Children: Syed Ahmed Shah
- Writing career
- Genres: Ghazal, Nazm
- Notable awards: Kaka Hatrasi Award

Syed Aijazuddin Shah (Popular Meeruthi) (Urdu: پاپولرمیرٹھی, Hindi: पॉपुलर मेरठी) is an Urdu and Hindi humorist, satirist and poet. He has been performing Mushaira and Kavi Sammelan for the last 45 years all over the world. Popular Meeruthi was awarded Kaka Hatrasi Award for his humorous poetry by HRD Minister Shri Ramesh Pokhriyal

== Early life ==
He was born on 9 August 1953 in Meerut to Syed Nizamuddin Shah and Syeda Akhtari Begum. He went to Faiz-E-Am Inter College in Meerut. While doing his graduation, he was the President of the Students’ Association. He completed his graduation and post-graduation from Meerut College. He was awarded a PhD in Urdu literature from Chaudhary Charan Singh University in 2009 for Mazhayia Shayri, Nafsiyati Mutalia.

== Career ==
He began his career teaching Urdu literature in the Urdu department of Meerut College. After becoming popular with Mushaira, he gave up teaching to pursue it. He recited poems in 'Tamseli Mushaires' organized in Faiz-e-Am inter college. He attended his first international Mushaira in Saudi Arabia in 1989.

== Performance ==
Meeruthi is among very few senior shayars of India. While traveling around the world, he has made promoted Indian culture and the Hindi and Urdu languages abroad. Popular Meeruthi was invited as a guest in The Kapil Sharma Show on the 23 January 2022 episode of Season 3 along with Shailesh Lodha and Sanjay Jhala. Popular Meeruthi was also invited in Wah! Wah! Kya Baat Hai! on Sony SAB TV He has travelled all over the world to attend Mushairas and Kavi Sammelan.

== List of publications ==
Popular Meeruthi has published books in Urdu, Hindi

- Haas Kar Guzar Dai, 1993
- Nawai e Rafta, 2002
- Double Role, 2005
- Popular Kalam, 2009
- Zikar Fiqar Aur Fun, 2016
- Munshi Sher Kha Boom Meeruthi, 2018
- Ghalib Aur Main, 2022
