= Comedy Couple =

- Official Poster
- Directed by: Nachiket Samant
- Written by: Bikas Ranjan Mishra
- Story by: Bikas Ranjan Mishra
- Produced by: Vikram Mehra; Siddharth Anand Kumar
- Starring: Saqib Saleem; Shweta Basu Prasad
- Cinematography: Riju Das
- Edited by: Abhishek Seth
- Music by: Tanmaya Bhatnagar; Reuksh Alagh
- Production company: Yoodlee films
- Distributed by: ZEE5
- Release date: 21 October 2020
- Running time: 117 minutes
- Country: India
- Language: Hindi

Comedy Couple is a 2020 ZEE5 Original Indian Hindi language film directed by Nachiket Samant and starring Saqib Saleem and Shweta Basu Prasad in lead roles. It captures the journey of stand-up comedy duo Deep and Zoya who joke about couple issues on stage but deal with them in real life.

== Plot ==
Deep is an IT professional turned comedian who is hiding 2 big truths of his life from his conservative family - his profession and his girlfriend Zoya. Zoya is a level-headed girl who is very much in love with Deep but is easily irked by certain traits of his. Together they are a laugh riot on stage, cracking jokes on relationship issues while dealing with them off stage. Their professional and personal lives collide in the backdrop of a comedy act that goes viral. They are helped by Siddhu - the couple's talent manager and Bala -their broker to navigate their crazy ride.

== Cast ==
- Saqib Saleem as Deep Sharma
- Shweta Basu Prasad as Zoya Batra
- Jasmeet Singh Bhatia as Timmy
- Subha Rajput as Aditi
- Aadar Malik as Rohan
- Pranay Manchanda as Siddhu
- Madhu Sachdeva as Neeta
- Raaz Khanna
- Rajesh Tailang as Mukesh Sharma
- Pooja Bedi as Zohra Batra
- Anubhav Singh Bassi as himself (Cameo)

== Release ==
Comedy Couple was premiered through ZEE5 on 21 October 2020.

== Music ==
The film's music was composed by Tanmaya Bhatnagar and Reuksh Alagh while lyrics written by Tanmaya Bhatnagar.

Track listing
No.	Title	Lyrics	Music	Singer(s)	Length
1.	"Kya Yeh Tumhe Pata Hai?"	Tanmaya Bhatnagar	Tanmaya Bhatnagar, Reuksh Alagh	Tanmaya Bhatnagar, Reuksh Alagh	3:20

== Reception ==
Anna MM Vetticad from Firstpost gave 2.5 rating out of 5 and wrote “Comedy Couple bravely picks several relevant subjects to cover: social conservatism, freedom of expression, religious bigotry, violent fundamentalism, media sensationalism and more. A pity then that its initially fun and fresh tone gives way to an ultimately superficial take on its primary area of focus: unmarriagehood in Gurgaon” Anvita Singh from The Indian Express “The blend of romance, comedy and lies is not novel, but at least it has some potential, which is fully realised towards the fag end of the movie. It is then that we see characters truly coming into their own, tackling their fears, trying to resolve a central conflict and even evoking some laughter in the process”

Soumya Srivastava from Hindustan Times stated “Saqib Saleem and Shweta Basu Prasad star in Nachiket Samant’s film about a couple in Gurugram who are trying to make it big in the comedy world. The film, while brave in a few choices it makes, is marred by unimpressive writing and performances” Tiasa Bhowal from India Today shared her review “Comedy Couple gets really monotonous and Nachiket Samant does very little to lift it. The real downer is that even though the film is based on the life of two stand-up comedians, the jokes in the film are not even funny”

The Scroll stated “The movie is salvaged by excellent chemistry between and sincere performances by Saqib Saleem and Shweta Basu Prasad. They have a sweet and believable vibe going, and in a film with less lazy writing and better gags, their efforts would have actually amounted to something” Pallabi Dey Purkayastha form Times Of India wrote “Comedy Couple is your typical Bollywood rom-com with a fresh pair and even fresher central theme. Look the other way if you are pining to witness innovation in this genre, stay if you are in it only for the laughs”
