= Sumona Chakravarti =

Indian actress (born 1988)

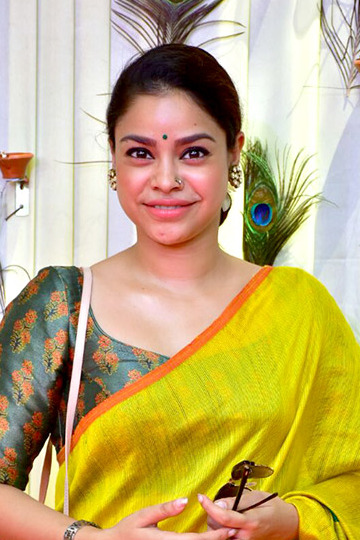
- Chakravarti in 2018
- Born: 24 June 1988 (age 38); Lucknow, Uttar Pradesh, India
- Education: Jai Hind College, Mumbai
- Occupations: Actress, model
- Years active: 1999–present
- Known for: The Kapil Sharma Show; Comedy Nights with Kapil; Comedy Circus

Sumona Chakravarti (born 24 June 1988) is an Indian actress who works in Hindi television productions. She is best known for her roles in Sony TV's daily soap opera, Bade Achhe Lagte Hain, with Comedy Nights with Kapil on Colors TV and The Kapil Sharma Show on Sony TV. In 2024, she participated in the stunt based show, Fear Factor: Khatron Ke Khiladi 14, where she was a semifinalist.

== Career ==
She began her acting career at the age of 11 through Aamir Khan and Manisha Koirala starrer Mann in the year 1999. In the next few years she did quite a few television shows but her big breakthrough happened in 2011 when she played the role of Natasha in Bade Achhe Lagte Hain, a television show produced by Balaji Telefilms.

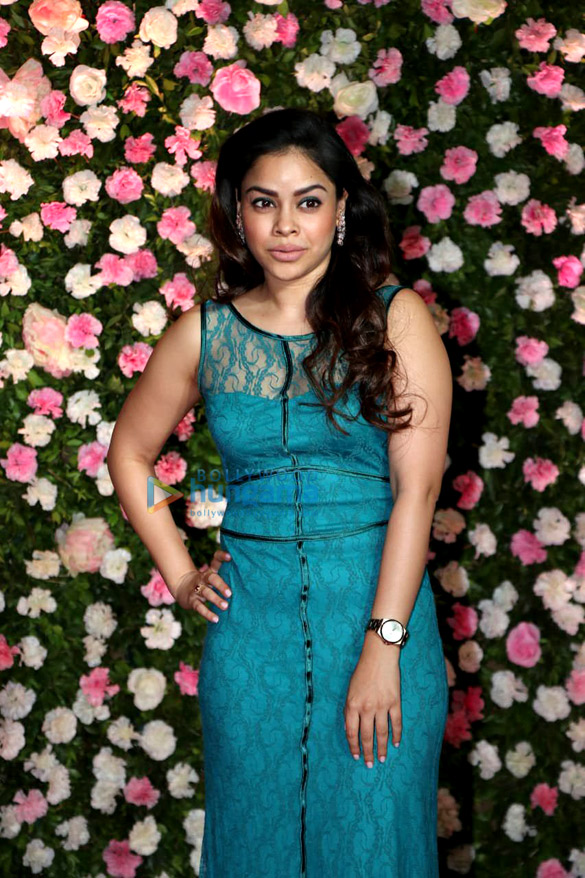
Sumona in 2018

In the following year she participated in the comedy show Kahani Comedy Circus Ki on Sony TV with Kapil Sharma and the duo emerged as the winners of the show. From there on, began her professional partnership with Kapil Sharma that is still active. From June 2013 to January 2016, she was seen as Manju Sharma in Comedy Nights with Kapil where she played the role of Kapil Sharma's wife. In 2016, she came back to the screen with Sony TV's The Kapil Sharma Show which she was seen playing the role of Sarla Gulati, a girl deeply in love with her neighbour Kapil. The show came back with its second season in 2018 where she is playing the role of Bhoori. She essayed the role until season 4, and returned as Bindu Sharma in the subsequent final season of the show which went on until 2023.

Sumona Chakravarti has presented two travel shows namely Dubai Diaries and Swiss Made Adventures both on NDTV Good Times. While she was the host in Dubai Diaries, she went in as a participant seeking the adventurous side of Switzerland in Swiss Made Adventures.

== Filmography ==
Year	Title	Role	Ref.
1999	Mann	Neha	
2010	Aakhari Decision	Mansee	
2012	Barfi!	Shruti's Friend	
2014	Kick	Vidhi	
2015	Phir Se...	Pia	

=== Television ===
Year	Title	Role	Notes	Ref.
2006	Kasamh Se	Nivedita Deb; Aparajit's sister		
2007	Detective Doll	Detective Doll		
2007	Sun Yaar Chill Maar			
2007–2009	Kasturi	Vandy Singhania		
2010	Neer Bhare Tere Naina Devi	Chiraiya		
2010	Sapno Se Bhare Naina			
2010	Horror Nights	Mia	Episode: "Haunted Hospital"	
2011	Khotey Sikkey	Anjali	Episode: "MLA Ashok Rao gets murdered in Williamson Hotel"	
2011–2014	Bade Achhe Lagte Hain	Natasha Amarnath Kapoor		
2012	Kahani Comedy Circus Ki	Sumona Chakravarti		
2013	Ek Thhi Naayka	Laboni		
2013–2016	Comedy Nights with Kapil	Manju Sharma		
2014	Savdhaan India	Shruti	(Episode 740)	
2014	Yeh Hai Aashiqui	Tejaswini "Tej"		
2015	Jamai Raja	Misha Grewal		
2016–2023	The Kapil Sharma Show	Sarla Gulati / Bhoori / Bindu Sharma		
2016	Dubai Diaries	Host		
2016	Swiss Made Adventures	Sumona Chakravarti	Traveller	
2017	Dev	Meera Ghosh		
2018–2021	Shonar Bengal	Host		
2024	Fear Factor: Khatron Ke Khiladi 14	Contestant	7th place	

== Theatre ==
Title	Year	Role	Director	Venue	Notes	Ref.
Da Dating Truths	2009		Prriya Ary and Ravi Gosain	St. Andrews Auditorium, Bandra (W), Mumbai		
The Relationship Agreement	2016	The Girl	Meherzad Patel	National Centre for the Performing Arts (India)		

== Awards and nominations ==
=== Indian Telly Awards ===
Year	Nominated Work	Category	Result	Ref.
2014	Comedy Nights with Kapil	Best Ensemble Cast	Won	

=== Indian Television Academy Awards ===
Year	Nominated Work	Category	Result	Ref.
2015	Comedy Nights with Kapil	Best Actress in a Supporting Role (Comedy)	Nominated	
2023	The Kapil Sharma Show- Season 5	Best Actress – Comedy -TV	Won	

=== Yash Bharti Award ===
Sumona Chakravarti was awarded with the Yash Bharti Award on 27 October 2016 by the Government of Uttar Pradesh.

== See also ==
- List of Indian television actresses
