= Rajiv Thakur =

Indian actor and comedian (born 1984)

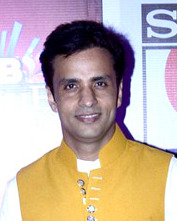
- Thakur at SAB Ke Anokhe Awards in 2019
- Born: 7 August 1979 (age 47); Amritsar, Punjab, India
- Occupations: Actor; comedian
- Years active: 2008–present
- Notable work: The Great Indian Kapil Show; IC 814: The Kandahar Hijack
- Spouse: Aarti Thakur (m. 2005)
- Children: 3

Rajiv Thakur (born 7 August 1979) is an actor and comedian known for his works in Hindi television and Punjabi films.

== Partial filmography ==
=== Television ===
Year	Title	Role	Notes	Ref.
2007	The Great Indian Laughter Challenge	Contestant		
2008–2011	Comedy Circus	Contestant		
2009	Sajan Re Jhoot Mat Bolo	Raju/Ishwar Lal Shah		
2012	Golmaal Hai Bhai Sab Golmaal Hai			
2016–2023	The Kapil Sharma Show	Raju, Thakur, Various characters		
2023	Jhalak Dikhhla Jaa 11	Contestant	Eliminated	
2024	The Great Indian Kapil Show	Kap's Cafe Attendant	Netflix	
2024	IC 814: The Kandahar Hijack	Chief	Netflix	

=== Films ===
Year	Film	Role	Language	Notes	Ref.
2008	Lakh Pardesi Hoiye		Punjabi		
2010	Bhavnao Ko Samjho	Shekhar's friend	Hindi		
2010	Khich Ghuggi Khich	Ghuggi's son-in-law	Punjabi		
2014	Dil Vil Pyaar Vyaar	Raja	Punjabi		
2015	Second Hand Husband	Deepak	Hindi		
2016	Tutak Tutak Tutiya	Krishna's friend	Hindi		
2016	Devi	Yellow T-shirt man	Tamil	Cameo	
2016	Abhinetri	Yellow T-shirt man	Telugu	Cameo	
2017	Dangar Doctor Jelly	Jai Bhardwaj	Punjabi		
2017	Lahoriye	Kikkar's friend	Punjabi		
2019	Tara Mira	Sharma	Punjabi		
2023	Majnu Kharchili Laila	Ritik Singla	Punjabi	Lead role	
2023	Zindagi Zindabad	Ravi	Punjabi		
2025	Mano Ya Na Mano	Vansh	Hindi		
