= Second Hand Husband =

2015 Indian film

- Directed by: Smeep Kang
- Written by: Smeep Kang; Shreya Srivastava; Vaibhav Suman
- Produced by: Amolak Singh Gakhal
- Starring: Gippy Grewal; Tina Ahuja; Dharmendra; Ravi Kishan
- Cinematography: Manoj Shaw
- Edited by: Ritesh Soni
- Music by: Dr Zeus; DJ Flow; Jatinder Shah; Badshah
- Production company: Gakhal Brothers Entertainment Pvt.Ltd.
- Release date: 3 July 2015
- Running time: 105 minutes
- Country: India
- Languages: Hindi; Punjabi

Second Hand Husband is a 2015 Indian romantic comedy film produced by GB Entertainment and directed by Smeep Kang and starring Gippy Grewal, Tina Ahuja, and Dharmendra. The film marks the Bollywood film debut of Govinda’s daughter, Tina Ahuja, and Punjabi singer and actor Gippy Grewal. The film released on 3 July 2015.

== Plot ==
Rajbir and Gurpreet are in love and want to marry each other. The only thing stopping them is the alimony that Rajbir has to pay every month to his ex-wife, Neha. Gurpreet, being a lawyer, is aware that the alimony needs to be paid only until Neha remarries. Thus, begins the two lover's journey to find a suitable groom for Rajbir's ex-wife. Their comic journey goes through various twists and turns and finally culminates at a point where Rajbir's boss, Ajit Singh, gets into trouble with his wife because of his flirtatious ways.

== Cast ==
- Gippy Grewal as Rajbir Singh Grewal aka Rajbir
- Tina Ahuja as Gurpreet Kaur
- Dharmendra as Ajit Singh
- Rati Agnihotri as Beant Kaur (Ajit's wife)
- Geeta Basra as Neha Kaur Grewal
- Ravi Kishan as Rameshwar, Gurpreet's brother
- Gurpreet Ghuggi as Bhagwan Chai Wala
- Alok Nath as Somnath, Gurpreet's father
- Sanjay Mishra as Manilal Ajit's wife's lawyer
- Vijay Raaz as Inspector Rakesh
- Rubina as Namrata, Vijay Raaz's love interest
- Karamjit Anmol as Constable
- Deepshikha Nagpal as Kajal
- Supriya Karnik as Pammi
- Mukesh Tiwari as Baldev, Pammi's husband
- Rajiv Thakur as Deepak
- Harbhajan Singh as a police officer (special appearance)

== Production ==
Geeta Basra joined the cast in December 2014. Govinda's daughter Tina Ahuja is being launched in the film as Narmmadaa. The Gippy Grewal’s role was offered to such actors like Ajay Devgn, Saif Ali Khan, Varun Dhawan and Vicky Kaushal. Followed by Tina Ahuja’s role was offered to Shriya Saran, Shruti Haasan, Vaani Kapoor, Jacqueline Fernandez and Geeta Basra’s role was offered to such actresses like Mrunal Thakur, Gauahar Khan, Tabu and Taapsee Pannu and also Harbhajan Singh’s role to Nawazuddin Siddiqui, Sudesh Lehri, Varun Sharma with the title Shaadi Ke Second Handed Lovers.

== Soundtrack ==
Second Hand Husband (Music Album)

Soundtrack album by Gippy Grewal, Dr Zeus and Sunidhi Chauhan
- Released: 8 June 2015
- Genre: Film soundtrack
- Length: 0:18:59
- Label: Zee Music Company
- Producer: Zee Music Company

All lyrics are written by Aman Pathela; all music is composed by Dr Zeus, Aman, Badshah, DJ Flow and Jatinder Singh-Shah.

Track Listing
No.	Title	Writer(s)	Artist	Length
1.	"Second Hand Husband"		Gippy Grewal	00:02:37
2.	"Mitthi Meri Jaan"	Jatinder Shah	Gippy Grewal, Jasmine Sandlas	00:02:57
3.	"Bad Baby"	Aman Pathela	Gippy Grewal, Badshah, Seedhe Maut	00:02:44
4.	"Jawaani Din Char"	Jatinder Shah	Labh Janjua, Sunidhi Chauhan	00:02:42
5.	"Channa"	Jatinder Shah	Sunidhi Chauhan	00:03:58
6.	"Nimbu Ka Achaar"	Jatinder Shah	Mika Singh & KK	16:22:21
Total length:				00:18:59
