= Nikul C. Desai =

Indian television director

- Occupation: Television director
- Years active: 2001–present

Nikul C. Desai is an Indian television director, known for directing shows such as Rising Star, Comedy Circus, Comedy Nights Bachao and Entertainment Ki Raat. He is also the creative producer and nonfiction content head at Optimystix Entertainment.

== Early life and career ==
Nikul was born into a Gujarati Jain family. He started off his career as an assistant director at Optimystix Entertainment in 2001.

In 2006, Nikul was working as an associate director in a television series. He received his first break as a full-time television director when the existing director of a show fell ill.

Nikul shot to fame after directing Comedy Circus, that ran for eighteen seasons between 2007 and 2018 on Sony Entertainment Television. He is credited for having introduced comedians like Kapil Sharma, Krushna Abhishek, Bharti Singh, and Sudesh Lehri to audiences.

His recent show as a director, Taare Zameen Par, was a kid singing reality show that aired on StarPlus. The series was hosted by the child actress Aakriti Sharma and singer Sugandha Mishra with Shankar Mahadevan, Jonita Gandhi and Tony Kakkar as the mentors. Nikul is currently directing the ongoing daily nonfiction show on Sab TV titled – Good Night India.

=== Television ===
Year	Show	Channel	Role
2009	Chichpokli To China	Sony Entertainment Television	Creative director
2009	Comedy Circus 20-20	Sony Entertainment Television	Creative director
2009	Dekh India Dekh	Sony Entertainment Television	Creative director
2009	Laughter Ke Phatke	Star One	Creative director
2010	Comedy Circus Ka Mahasangram	Sony Entertainment Television	Creative director
2010	Comedy Circus Ke Superstars	Sony Entertainment Television	Creative director
2010	Comedy Circus Ka Daily Soap	Sony Entertainment Television	Creative director
2010	Comedy Circus Ka Jadoo	Sony Entertainment Television	Creative director
2010	Jubilee Comedy Circus	Sony Entertainment Television	Creative director
2011	Comedy Circus Ke Taansen	Sony Entertainment Television	Creative director
2011	Comedy Circus Ke Naya Daur	Sony Entertainment Television	Creative director
2012	Comedy Circus Ke Ajoobe	Sony Entertainment Television	Creative director
2012	Kahani Comedy Circus Ki	Sony Entertainment Television	Creative director
2012	Comedy Circus Ke Mahabali	Sony Entertainment Television	Creative director
2012	Uthe Sabke Kadam	Sony SAB	Creative director
2012	Comedy Circus Ke Ajoobe	Sony Entertainment Television	Creative director
2012	Dirty Khabar	Sony Max	Creative director
2014	Comedy Classes	Life OK	Creative director
2015	Comedy Nights Bachao	Colors TV	Creative director
2016	Comedy Nights Live	Colors TV	Creative director
2017	Comedy Dangal	And TV	Creative director
2017	Entertainment Ki Raat	Colors TV	Creative Producer
2017	Rising Star (Indian TV series)	Colors TV	Creative Producer
2018	Sabse Smart Kaun	StarPlus	Creative Producer
2020	Taare Zameen Par	StarPlus	Director
2021	Good Night India	Sony Entertainment Television	Creative Producer
2025	Pati Patni Aur Panga – Jodiyon Ka Reality Check	Colors TV	Creative Producer

== Awards ==
- 2018: Indian Television Academy Awards
