= V.I.P. (comedian) =

Indian actor, Comedian

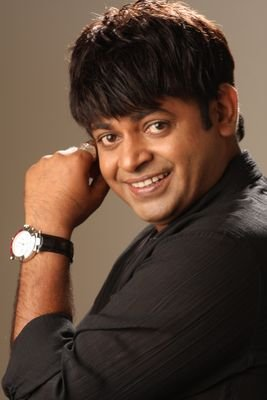
- Born: Vijay Ishwarlal Pawar; 23 May 1973 (age 53); Mumbai, Maharashtra, India
- Occupations: Comedian, Actor, Motivational Speaker

Vijay Ishwarlal Pawar (born 23 May 1973), better known by his stage name V.I.P., is an Indian standup comedian and TV actor. His father is also a comedian.

== Career ==
He started his television career in 2007 with Comedy Circus on Sony Entertainment Television. He has appeared in several Television shows like in (2012–2013) Comedy Circus Ke Ajoobe, Comedy Circus - Kaante Ki Takkar (2008), Comedy Circus 2 (2008), Comedy Circus Ke Superstars (2010), Comedy Circus Ka Jadoo (2010), Comedy Circus Ke Tansen (2011). In 2008, VIP won the second season of the comedy reality contest show Comedy Circus on Sony TV with his partner Juhi Parmar. The duo of V.I.P. and Swapnil Joshi were finalists in the first season of the show in 2007.

He started his film career with the multi-starrer blockbuster Bol Bachchan (2012). Since then he has also done films and sitcoms like Hum Sab Ullu Hain (2015), Sajan Re Phir Jhooth Mat Bolo (2017–2018), Yeh Kaisa Tigdam (2018) and most recently Zindagi Tumse (2019). V.I.P. is well known for his mimicry. He can do instant mimicry of more than 150 actors of the Bollywood.

== Filmography ==
Television

- Comedy Circus (Sony TV) - 2007, 2008 and 2010
- Dekh India Dekh (Sony TV) - 2009
- Nautanki The Comedy Theatre (Colors)
- The Great Indian Family Drama (Sab TV)
- Comedy Nights
- Comedy Classes (Life OK)
- Comedy Nights Bachao (Colors - 2015)
- Zindagi Tumse (2019 ) director Tariq Bhat
- Bhakharwadi (2019) as himself (Cameo)
