= Madness Machayenge – India Ko Hasayenge =

Indian comedy show

- Genre: Comedy show
- Created by: Vipul D. Shah
- Starring: See below
- Country of origin: India
- Original language: Hindi
- No. of episodes: 32

Production
- Camera setup: Multi-camera
- Running time: 45 minutes
- Production company: Optimystix Entertainment

Original release
- Network: Sony Entertainment Television; Sony LIV
- Release: 9 March – 6 July 2024

Madness Macheyenge - India Ko Hasayenge (transl. Will Create Madness - Will Make India Laugh) is an Indian comedy show on Sony TV. It premiered on 9 March 2024 to 6 July 2024. It stars Huma Qureshi, Harsh Gujral, Kettan Singh, Paritosh Tripathi, Gaurav More, Siddharth Sagar, Hemangi Kavi, Snehil Mehra, Inder Sahni, Ankita Shrivastav and Kushal Badrike.

== Description ==
Madness Machayenge is the latest comedy TV show broadcast on Sony TV. The show has all kinds of entertaining segments including stand-up comedy, group acts, roasting, movie spoofs, and many more.

The Tribune described the show as follows: "Sony Entertainment Television is all set to tickle your funny bone with its new and refreshing comedy show Madness Machayenge – India Ko Hasayenge. Redefining the genre by breaking the conventional norms of comedy, this show will effortlessly deliver varied styles of comedy with an impressive line-up of seasoned comedians — Paritosh Tripathi, Snehil Dixit Mehra, Gaurav More, Kettan Singh, Ankita Shrivastav, Kushal Badrike, Inder Sahani and Hemangi Kavi. Week after week, each comedian will be given fun challenges and tasks by the show’s Madness Ki Malkin, Huma Qureshi. Acclaimed stand-up comedian Harsh Gujral turns host for this hilarious show that promises to give you the much-needed dose of weekend entertainment."

== Episodes ==
No.	Episode Title	Guest(s)	Original release date
1	The Beginning of Madness	Munawar Faruqui	9 March 2024
2	Hello Brothers	Arbaaz Khan, Sohail Khan	10 March 2024
3	Combo Atrangi	Anup Jalota, Urfi Javed	16 March 2024
4	Fun Night With Ameesha Patel	Ameesha Patel	17 March 2024
5	King-Queen of Reality Shows	Anu Malik, Geeta Kapur	23 March 2024
6	Bhagyashree Lights Up the Show	Bhagyashree	30 March 2024
7	Big Laughs With The Great Khali	The Great Khali	6 April 2024
8	Kaleshi Queens	Kamya Panjabi, Surbhi Chandna, Adaa Khan	7 April 2024
9	Madness of Shakti Kapoor	Shakti Kapoor	13 April 2024
10	Comedians ki Ultimate Masti	—	14 April 2024
11	Mushaira Special	Shailesh Lodha	20 April 2024
12	Fun Time With Remo D'Souza	Remo D'souza	21 April 2024
13	Juhi Chawla Lights Up The Stage With Laughter	Juhi Chawla	27 April 2024
14	Comedy Special	Shekhar Suman	28 April 2024
15	Bollywood Meri Jaan	—	4 May 2024
16	First Time Life Experiences	—	5 May 2024
17	A Blend of Comedy and Music	Avirbhav S., Pihu Sharma and Kshitij Saxena of Superstar Singer	11 May 2024
18	Mother's Day Special	Mothers of all comic artists of the show	12 May 2024
19	An Evening of Laughter with Mallika Sherawat	Mallika Sherawat	18 May 2024
20	Fun and Laughter with Chunky Panday	Chunky Pandey	19 May 2024
21	Fun Night With Moushumi Chatterjee	Moushumi Chatterjee	25 May 2024
22	Jimmy Shergill Joins Madness	Jimmy Shergill	26 May 2024
23	Celebrating Neelam Kothari Soni	Neelam Kothari	1 June 2024
24	Laughter Extravaganza	—	2 June 2024
25	Roller Coaster of Laughter	—	8 June 2024
26	Love and Laughter With Ammy and Sonam	Ammy Virk, Sonam Bajwa	15 June 2024
27	Baiko Ka Janamdin	—	16 June 2024
28	Farah Khan Brings the Laughter to the New Heights	Farah Khan	22 June 2024
29	Kanjoosi Ka Gehna	Farah Khan	23 June 2024
30	Comic Genius	—	29 June 2024
31	Unfortunate Circumstances	—	30 June 2024
32	Achiever's Award Night	—	6 July 2024

== Cast ==
- Huma Qureshi as Madness ki Malkin
- Harsh Gujral as Host
- Paritosh Tripathi
- Gaurav More
- Siddharth Sagar
- Kettan Singh
- Snehil Mehra Dixit
- Hemangi Kavi
- Kushal Badrike
- Sagar Karande
- Inder Sahni
- Ankita Shrivastav
- Urfi Javed
- Sugandha Mishra
- Srishty Rode
- Gaurav More
- Balraj Syal
- Kaveri Priyam
- Mubeen
- Ojas Rawal
