= Siddharth Sagar =

Indian comedian and television actor (born 1993)

- Born: 15 June 1993 (age 33); Delhi, India
- Occupations: Actor comedian
- Years active: 2009–present

Siddharth Sagar (born 15 June 1993) is an Indian comedian and television actor. He is the winner of Comedy Circus Ke Ajoobe teamed with Krishna Abhishek and Sudesh Lehri. He has played the lead role in horror comedy show Pritam Pyare Aur Woh.

== Career ==
Siddharth started working on stage from the age of 8. When he was 13, he made his television debut with Comedy Circus - Chinchpokli To China on Sony Entertainment Television. He participated in various stand-up comedy shows, Comedy Circus, including, Chhote Miyan Bade Miyan, Laughter Ke Phatke, Comedy Circus Ke Ajoobe. He also hosted the Sab Ke Anokhe Awards. He also worked in Comedy Classes on Life Ok and later appeared on the Kapil Sharma Show.

In 2018, he mysteriously went missing for a few months until recently when he called a press conference and opened up about his family problems, his experience with substance abuse. He alleged that his case was greatly mishandled at the rehabilitation centre, claiming he was beaten and treated for the ailments he did not have.

In 2020, he made a comeback with Gangs of Filmistan on Star Bharat.

'What Nonsense' Comedy Series Season 1 & 2 with Various Artists,

== Television ==
| Year(s) | Name of Show | Role(s) | Notes | Ref. |
|---|---|---|---|---|
| 2009–2018 | Comedy Circus | Various characters | | |
| 2009 | Chhote Miyan Bade Miyan | Contestant | | |
| 2010 | Laughter Ke Phatke | Contestant | | |
| 2014 | Pritam Pyare Aur Woh | Pritam | | |
| 2014–2016 | Comedy Classes | Nasser / Selfie Mausi / Various characters | | |
| 2016 | Comedy Nights Live | Mangala / Various characters | | |
| 2020 | Gangs of Filmistan | Various characters | | |
| 2021 | Zee Comedy Show | Various characters | | |
| 2022–2023 | The Kapil Sharma Show | Ustad Gharchordas/ Various characters | | |
| 2022 | Case Toh Banta Hai | Various characters | | |
| 2024 | Madness Machayenge - India Ko Hasayenge | Various characters | | |
| 2025 | What Nonsense - Comedy Series | Various characters | | |
