= Comedy Nights Bachao =

Indian roast TV show (2015–2017)

- Genre: Comedy
- Created by: Vipul D Shah; Sanjeev Sharma; Sabir ali
- Based on: Roast comedy
- Written by: Dinesh Brigedier; Manoj Sabharwal; Haarsh Limbachiyaa
- Directed by: Nikul Desai
- Creative director: Chirag Shah
- Presented by: Krushna Abhishek; Sudesh Lehri; Bharti Singh; Mubeen
- Starring: Shakeel Siddiqui; Sudesh Lehri; Krushna Abhishek; Bharti Singh; Adaa Khan; Karan Wahi; Tejaswi Prakash; Nia Sharma; Anita Hassanandani; Karishma Tanna; Arjun Bijlani; Sara Khan; Aditi Bhatia; Sharad Malhotra; Helly Shah; Sanaya Irani; Hina Khan; Kishwer Merchant; Tina Datta; Arti Singh; See below for other listings
- Country of origin: India
- Original language: Hindi
- No. of seasons: 2
- No. of episodes: 64

Production
- Editor: Sophia Satapathy
- Camera setup: Multi-camera
- Running time: 55 minutes
- Production company: Optimystix Entertainment

Original release
- Network: Colors TV
- Release: 5 September 2015 – 15 January 2017

Related
- Comedy Nights Live; Comedy Nights with Kapil

Comedy Nights Bachao (English: Comedy Nights, Help!) is an Indian Hindi-language comedy television series which premiered on 5 September 2015. The series used to air on Sunday nights on Colors TV. The series was a reality show with a format similar to Comedy Circus. It had many of the same production team members and was produced by Optimystix Entertainment. The presenters of this show were Krushna Abhishek, Sudesh Lehri, Bharti Singh Mubeen and Mona Singh.

== Cast ==
=== Season 1 (Comedy Nights Bachao) ===
- Krushna Abhishek
- Sudesh Lehri
- Bharti Singh
- Mubeen Saudagar
- Anita Hassanandani
- Karan Wahi
- Puja Banerjee
- Shruti Seth
- Shakeel Siddiqui
- Adaa Khan
- Naseem Vicky
- Pritam Singh
- Sara Khan

Cameos

- Surbhi Jyoti for 2 episodes
- Siddharth Jadhav for 2 episodes
- Raghu Ram for 2 episodes
- Rajiv Laxman for 2 episodes
- Manan Desai for 1 episode
- Shikha Singh for 1 episode
- Aastha Gill for 1 episode

=== Season 2 (Comedy Nights Bachao Taaza) ===
- Krushna Abhishek
- Bharti Singh
- Sudesh Lehri
- Mubeen Saudagar
- Adaa Khan
- Puja Banerjee
- Anita Hassanandani
- Karan Wahi
- Nia Sharma
- Balraj Syal
- Aditi Bhatia
- Mona Singh as host
- Amruta Khanvilkar
- Sumeet Vyas
- Sharad Malhotra
- Asha Negi
- Manan Desai

Cameos

- Ruhanika Dhawan for 1 episode
- Shivansh Kotia for 1 episode
- Parth Bhalerao for 1 episode
- Asrani for 1 episode
- Helly Shah for 1 episode
- Karishma Tanna for 1 episode

== List of episodes ==
No.	Telecast date	Guest(s)	To promote	Ref.
1	5 September 2015	Sohail Khan, Mika Singh	Special Appearance	
2	12 September 2015	Salman Khan, Sooraj Pancholi, Athiya Shetty	Hero	
3	19 September 2015	Gulshan Grover, Shakti Kapoor, Ranjeet, Surveen Chawla	Special Appearance	
4	26 September 2015	Usha Nadkarni, Toral Rasputra, Radhika Madan, Shikha Singh	Balika Vadhu, Meri Aashiqui Tum Se Hi, Kumkum Bhagya	
5	3 October 2015	Dolly Bindra, Vindu Dara Singh, Raghu Ram, Rajiv Laxman	Special Appearance	
6	17 October 2015	Ganesh Acharya, Anu Malik, Geeta Kapoor, Chetan Bhagat	Special Appearance	
7	24 October 2015	Udit Narayan, Bappi Lahiri, Falguni Pathak, Neha Kakkar	Special Appearance	
8	31 October 2015	Randeep Hooda, Richa Chadda, Adil Hussain, Kartik Aaryan, Nushrat Bharucha, Sunny Singh, Sonnalli Seygall, Omkar Kapoor, Ishita Raj Sharma	Main Aur Charles, Pyaar Ka Punchnama 2	
9	7 November 2015	Karisma Kapoor, Chunky Pandey, Sanjeev Kapoor	Special Appearance	
10	14 November 2015	Avika Gor, Shrivardhan Trivedi, Shams Tahir Khan, Sanjay Prabhakar	Special Appearance	
11	21 November 2015	Sharman Joshi, Daisy Shah, Zarine Khan	Hate Story 3	
12	28 November 2015	Ranbir Kapoor, Deepika Padukone	Tamasha	
13	5 December 2015	Suniel Shetty, Raveena Tandon, Sukhwinder Singh	Swasth Bharat	
14	12 December 2015	Shahrukh Khan, Varun Dhawan, Varun Sharma, Kriti Sanon	Dilwale	
15	19 December 2015	Ranveer Singh, Deepika Padukone	Bajirao Mastani	
16	26 December 2015	Saroj Khan, Divya Dutta, Juhi Chawla	Chalk n Duster	
17	2 January 2016	Nimrat Kaur, Akshay Kumar	Airlift	
18	9 January 2016	Sunny Deol, Shivam Patil, Diana Khan, Rishabh Arora, Aanchal Munjal	Ghayal Once Again	
19	16 January 2016	Tushar Kapoor, Aftab Shivdasani, Krushna Abhishek, Gizele Thakral	Kyaa Kool Hain Hum 3	
20	17 January 2016	Sunny Leone, Vir Das, Suresh Menon, Milap Zaveri, Akshay Kumar, Nimrat Kaur	Mastizaade, Airlift	
21	30 January 2016	Arjun Kapoor, Mahi Vij, Tanisha Mukherjee, Aishwarya Sakhuja, Sana Saeed	Khatron Ke Khiladi	
22	6 February 2016	Kamaal Rashid Khan, Sana Khan, Ajaz Khan, Rahul Mahajan	Special Appearance	
23	13 February 2016	Pulkit Samrat, Yami Gautam, Urvashi Rautela, Divya Khosla Kumar, Mithoon Sharma, Shaan, Bharti Singh	Sanam Re	
24	20 February 2016	Manish Paul, Sikandar Kher, Riya Sen, Pradhuman Singh, Sonam Kapoor	Tere Bin Laden: Dead or Alive, Neerja	
25	27 February 2016	Remo D'Souza, Dharmesh Yelande, Raghav Juyal	Special Appearance	
26	5 March 2016	Rajpal Yadav, Abhijeet Bhattacharya, Upen Patel, Karishma Tanna	MTV Love School	
27	12 March 2016	Sidharth Malhotra, Fawad Khan, Alia Bhatt	Kapoor & Sons	
28	19 March 2016	Prince Narula, Rannvijay Singh, Karan Kundra, Neha Dhupia	MTV Roadies	
29	26 March 2016	John Abraham, Sharad Kelkar, Nora Fatehi	Rocky Handsome	
30	2 April 2016	Sara Khan, Kishwer Merchant, Suyyash Rai, Sangram Singh, Arjun Bijlani, Arti Singh, Sharad Malhotra, Kamya Panjabi, Tina Dutta, Asha Negi, Karan Wahi, Anita Hassanandani, Vishal Singh	Box Cricket League	
31	9 April 2016	Shah Rukh Khan	Fan	
32	16 April 2016	Neha Dhupia, Boman Irani, Manoj Bajpayee	Santa Banta Pvt Ltd, Traffic	
33	24 April 2016	Helly Shah, Mouni Roy, Sudha Chandran, Jayati Bhatia, Sushant Singh (Integration episode with Comedy Nights Live)	Swaragini, Naagin, Sasural Simar Ka, Savdhaan India	
34	30 April 2016	Mika Singh (cameo) and Mallika Sherawat	Special Appearance	
35	7 May 2016	Ravi Kishan, Manoj Tiwari, Dinesh Lal Yadav, Khesari Lal Yadav, Yo Yo Honey Singh, Gurbani Judge	Special Appearance, Zorawar	
36	14 May 2016	Manmeet Singh, Harmeet Singh (Meet Bros), Jasmine Sandlas, Kanika Kapoor, Anushka Manchanda	Party Animal (music album)	
37	21 May 2016	Ram Gopal Verma, Ankit Tiwari, Mandira Bedi, Kumar Sanu, Sonal Chauhan	Veerappan, Badtameez (music album)	
38	28 May 2016	Jacqueline Fernandez, Lisa Haydon, Akshay Kumar, Chunky Pandey, Abhishek Bachchan, Ritesh Deshmukh	Housefull 3	
39	4 June 2016	Jacqueline Fernandez, Lisa Haydon, Akshay Kumar, Chunky Pandey, Abhishek Bachchan, Ritesh Deshmukh	Housefull 3	
40	11 June 2016	Sofia Hayat, Rakhi Sawant, Shefali Zariwala, Alok Nath, Aarti Chhabria	Special Appearance	
41	18 June 2016	Altaf Raja, Usha Uthup, Raftaar (singer), Sreesanth, Badshah, Gurinder Rai	Special Appearance, Garrari Pitbull Te	
42	25 June 2016	Archana Vijaya, Shibani Dandekar, Pallavi Sharda, Shonali Nagrani, Vinod Kambli, Badshah	Special Appearance	
43	3 July 2016	Farah Khan, The Great Khali	Special Appearance	
44	16 July 2016	Urvashi Rautela, Ritesh Deshmukh, Vivek Oberoi, Pooja Bose, Salman Khan, Anushka Sharma	Great Grand Masti, Sultan	
45	31 July 2016	Neha Dhupia, Varun Sharma, Ravi Kishan, Manan Desai, Varun Dhawan, John Abraham	Special Appearance, Dishoom	
46	7 August 2016	Salman Yusuff Khan, Nora Fatehi, Shakti Arora, Rahul Roy, Sidhant Gupta, Arjun Bijlani, Karishma Tanna	Jhalak Dikhhla Jaa (season 9)	
47	14 August 2016	Namish Taneja, Gurmeet Chaudhary, Tejaswi Prakash, Debina Bonnerjee, Sambhavna Seth, Avinash Dwivedi(Integration episode with Comedy Nights Live), Akshay Kumar, Ileana D'Cruz, Badshah	Swaragini, couples special, Rustom, Driving Slow	
48	28 August 2016	Rani Chatterjee, Mona Lisa, Khesari Lal Yadav, Avdhoot Gupte, Hardy Sandhu	Special Appearance	
49	4 September 2016	Nawazuddin Siddiqui, Sohail Khan, Jas Arora	Freaky Ali	
50	11 September 2016	Siddharth Malhotra, Katrina Kaif	Baar Baar Dekho	
51	18 September 2016	Sana Amin Sheikh, Meera Deosthale, Vidhi Pandya, Indira Krishnan, Dheeraj Dhoopar, Kader Khan, Kamya Panjabi, Uday Tikekar	Krishnadasi, Udaan, Sasural Simar Ka	
52	25 September 2016	Prabhu Deva, Sonu Sood, Navraj Hans	Tutak Tutak Tutiya	
53	2 October 2016	Sajid Khan, Wajid Khan, Miss Pooja, Sachin, Jigar	Special Appearance	
54	9 October 2016	Raza Murad, Radhika Apte, Tannishtha Chatterjee, Pradeep Rawat, Prem Chopra	Special Appearance, Parched	
55	15 October 2016	Teriya Magar, Gracy Goswami, Spandan Chaturvedi, Siddharth Nigam, Ruhanika Dhawan, Darsheel Safary, Preetjyot Singh, Salman Khan	Jhalak Dikhhla Jaa (Season 9) wild card entries, children's special, Bigg Boss 10	
56	23 October 2016	Ranbir Kapoor, Karan Johar	Ae Dil Hai Mushkil	
57	30 October 2016	Arbaaz Khan, Archana Puran Singh, Minnisha Lamba, Dino Morea	Special Appearance	
58	6 November 2016	Jwala Gutta, Deepa Karmakar, Devendra Jhanjharia, Sushil Kumar (wrestler)	Special Appearance	
59	13 November 2016	Neha Sharma, Aditya Seal, Aashim Gulati, Anubhav Sinha, Ankit Tiwari, Ranvir Shorey, Neha Dhupia, Prarthana Behere, Swapnil Joshi	Tum Bin 2, Fuge, Moh Maya Money	
60	20 November 2016	Sana Khan, Helen, Bindu, Gurmeet Chaudhary	Special Appearance, Wajah Tum Ho	
61	27 November 2016	John Abraham, Sonakshi Sinha, Tahir Bhasin	Special Appearance, Force 2	
62	29 November 2016	Yo Yo Honey Singh, Raftaar	Special Appearance	
63	4 December 2016	Mudassar Khan, Surveen Chawla, Sanjeev Kapoor, Ranveer Singh, Vaani Kapoor	Special Appearance, Befikre	
64	18 December 2016	DJ Akbar Sami, Pooja Bose, Himesh Reshammiya, Asrani, DJ Aqeel	Aap Se Mausiiquii	
65	15 January 2017	Anu Malik, Tanisha Mukherjee		
66	23 January 2017	Shahrukh Khan	Raees	
