= Institute of Nano Science and Technology =

Indian research institution

Institute of Nano Science and Technology, Mohali
- INST Mohali
- Type: Research Institute
- Established: January 2001
- Affiliations: Department of Science and Technology
- Chairman: Dipankar Das Sarma (Board of Governors)
- Director: Amitava Patra
- Location: Sector – 81, SAS Nagar, Knowledge City, Mohali-140306, Mohali, Punjab, India; 30.683529°N 76.736489°E
- Nickname: INST
- Website: www.inst.ac.in

The Institute of Nano Science and Technology (INST) is an autonomous research institution of Department of Science and Technology (India), under the Society Registration Act, 1960, under the umbrella of national mission on Nano Science and Technology (NANO MISSION)", which aims to promote growth and outreach of nanoscience and technology for the benefit of country. INST has been set up to undertake research and generate products/devices and technology in the area of Nanoscience and Technology. The institute aims to carry out research in the diverse and rapidly growing areas of nanoscience and technology with specific emphasis on the following areas: Agricultural Nanotechnology, Nanomedicine, Energy and Environmental Science, Quantum Materials and Device Physics, Nano Electronics, Microfluidics Based Technologies, Nanobiotechnology

== Organization and administration ==
The Institute of Nano Science and Technology is managed by a Board of Governors, composed of academics, researchers and administrators and headed (chairman) by Dipankar Das Sarma of Indian Institute of Science. Founding chairman of the Board of Governors was C. N. R. Rao of Jawaharlal Nehru Centre for Advanced Scientific Research (JNCASR), Jakkur, Bangalore. INST started its operations from 3 January 2013, under the former directorship of Ashok K Ganguli. After his tenure, from 1 Jan 2018 and 10 March 2020, Hirendra Nath Ghosh took charge as acting director of the institute. Amitava Patra is the newly appointed director, since 11 March 2020.

== Campus ==
The institute has shifted to its new campus at Sector – 81, SAS Nagar, Mohali-140306, Punjab. Under the directorship of Ashok K Ganguli the institute started its operations (administration and research) in this campus. Land for setting up the state of the art laboratories at permanent campus of INST was allotted by Punjab Government. The site is adjacent to Indian Institute of Science Education and Research (IISER) in Sector 81, Mohali.

=== Facilities ===
INST has a research lab, "Faraday lab" named after British scientist Michael Faraday. The laboratory is equipped with microscope, diffractometer, scattering system, spectrometer, analyzers, surface profiler, electrochemical workstation, fluorometer, calorimeter, rheometer. INST also has a laboratory at Indian Institutes of Science Education and Research. Sophisticated electron microscopes like SEM (Scanning electron microscope), TEM(Transmission electron microscope), AFM(Atomic Force microscope) belongs to high cost of bruker's company. Spectroscopies like UV-Vis spectroscopy, FTIR, Photoluminescence Spectroscopy, Raman spectroscopy. Diffractometers like XRD(x-ray diffractometer) and also equipments like Thermogravimetric analysis, Differential Thermogravimetric analysis.

== Research ==
Institute of Nano Science and Technology covers basic research addressing the diverse aspects of nanoscience and nanotechnology. The major thrust areas which INST intends to explore will be the following: Agricultural nanotechnology, sensors, medical nanotechnology, Quantum materials and device physics, nanotechnology based solutions for energy and environment, nano biotechnology.

== Outreach programs ==
INST organizes a philanthropic program called "School adoption program", launched in May 2015. Under this program, it provides necessary infrastructure, technological information and incentives to government schools in India. The institution also takes part in government programs such as Swach Bharath, Swasth Bharat, and Make in India.

== See also ==
- List of universities in India
- List of autonomous higher education institutes in India
