= Bol Bachchan =

2012 Indian film by Rohit Shetty

- Theatrical release poster
- Directed by: Rohit Shetty
- Written by: Screenplay: Yunus Sajawal; Dialogues: Sajid-Farhad
- Based on: Gol Maal by Hrishikesh Mukherjee
- Produced by: Ajay Devgn; Dhillin Mehta
- Starring: Ajay Devgn; Abhishek Bachchan; Asin; Prachi Desai; Krishna Abhishek; Neeraj Vora; Archana Puran Singh
- Cinematography: Dudley
- Edited by: Steven H. Bernard
- Music by: Original Soundtrack: Himesh Reshammiya; Guest Composers: Ajay–Atul; Background Score: Amar Mohile
- Production companies: Ajay Devgn FFilms; Shree Ashtavinayak Cine Vision; Shree Ashtavinayak LFS Infra
- Distributed by: Fox Star Studios
- Release date: 6 July 2012 (India)
- Running time: 155 minutes
- Country: India
- Language: Hindi
- Budget: ₹50 crore
- Box office: ₹165 crore

Bol Bachchan is a 2012 Indian Hindi-language action comedy film directed by Rohit Shetty and produced by Ajay Devgn and Dhillin Mehta under Ajay Devgn FFilms and Shree Ashtavinayak Cine Vision respectively, with Fox Star Studios serving as distributor and presenter. Based on a script by writers Yunus Sajwal and Farhad-Sajid, it stars Devgn, Abhishek Bachchan, Asin, Prachi Desai, Krushna Abhishek, Neeraj Vora and Archana Puran Singh. Loosely based on the 1979 film Gol Maal, it marks Bachchan's and Devgn's fourth collaboration after LOC: Kargil, Zameen (which was also Shetty's directorial debut) and Yuva.

Himesh Reshammiya composed the film's soundtrack with Ajay–Atul as guest composers on a dance number, with Amar Mohile composing the score. The trailer was launched on 24 May 2012. Bol Bachchan made a new record through advance ticket booking, and was released in cinemas on 6 July 2012, with a runtime of 155 minutes and an investment of ₹50 crore (US$5.3 million). The film marks Shetty's last collaborations with Vora, who died 5 years after the film's release, and with Ashtavinayak, which was suspended from trading that year and eventually liquidated two years later, shutting down, thus making Bol Bachchan its last film project.

Earning over ₹1 billion (US$11 million) net from domestic markets and more than ₹235 crore (US$25 million) worldwide, Bol Bachchan became a critical and commercial success and was remade in Telugu as Masala in 2013.

== Plot ==
Abbas Ali and his sister Sania lose a property case against their relatives in Delhi, and are left without a home. Shastri, a family friend, convinces them to move to Ranakpur, where he promises to get Abbas a job from his boss Prithviraj Raghuvanshi, an eccentric local leader who hates liars and punishes them harshly. Taking the offer, Abbas and Sania arrive at Ranakpur. They settle down and fall in with Shastri's son Ravi and his friends, who run a drama company.

One day, to save a child from drowning, Abbas breaks into Ranakpur's disputed temple, igniting a confrontation with Prithviraj's estranged cousin Vikrant. Prithviraj arrives at the scene and asks for his name, but Ravi barges in and lies that Abbas' name is Abhishek Bachchan, to avoid any religious tensions. Prithviraj hires Abhishek Bachchan (Abbas) as a supervisor. Sometime later, he spots Abbas celebrating Eid and confronts him. Abbas and the others lie that the man he saw was actually Abhishek's twin brother 'Abbas', an effeminate man and Kathak dancer. Abbas also lies about having a mother and recruits Zohra, a dancer, to play the part, and struggles as he tries to conceal his lies from Prithviraj.

Prithviraj hires the twin 'Abbas' to teach Kathak to his sister Radhika. She eventually finds out about Abbas' predicament, but promises to keep it secret. Prithviraj's assistant Maakhan begins suspecting Abbas when he watches Gol Maal, as the film's plot has many similarities with Abbas' stories, and tries to catch him in the act in sight of Prithviraj. However, Abbas narrowly escapes getting exposed.

Abbas gets closer to Radhika, but Prithviraj, who thinks that it’s the other twin 'Abbas', threatens him to leave her. Radhika meanwhile pressures Abbas for marriage and leaves her home, but Vikrant, who still holds grudges against Prithviraj, kidnaps her. Abhishek (Abbas) and Prithviraj team up to rescue her. Impressed by his actions, Prithviraj plans to get Abhishek and Radhika married. He also approaches Sania for marriage, who bears a coincidental resemblance to Apeksha, Prithviraj's deceased love.

Unwilling to lie anymore, Abbas and Sania decide to reveal the truth to Prithviraj, but Maakhan, who was spying on them, hears their conversation and reports it to Prithviraj. Enraged by the deception, Prithviraj invites Abbas and his group to his manor, where he exposes and humiliates them through a stage play. Afterwards, he pursues them in a mad chase, but gets stuck on the edge of a mountain as his car crashes. Abbas saves his life. He then comes clean to Prithviraj, who forgives him, and promises to never lie again.

== Cast ==
- Ajay Devgn as Prithviraj Raghuvanshi
- Abhishek Bachchan as Abbas Ali alias Abhishek Bachchan
- Asin in a dual role as:
  - Sania Ali a.k.a. Sania Bachchan, Abbas's a.k.a. Abhishek's sister
  - Apeksha Shekhawat, Prithvi's love-interest
- Prachi Desai as Radhika Raghuvanshi, Prithvi's sister and Abbas' love interest
- Archana Puran Singh as Zohra, a dancer
- Krushna Abhishek as Ravi Shastri, Abbas' friend
- Asrani as Shastri
- Paresh Ganatra as Builder
- Neeraj Vora as Maakhan
- Vijay Ishwarlal Pawar as Kailash
- Prasad Barve as Ravi's friend
- Jeetu Verma as Vikrant Raghuvanshi, Prithvi's cousin
- Robin Bhatt as Judge
- Krishna Shetty as Radhika Raghuvanshi's college friend
- Noushaad Abbas as Prithviraj's henchman
- Amitabh Bachchan as himself in the title song "Bol Bachchan" (special appearance)

== Production ==
The film was originally expected for a Diwali 2011 release, though was postponed to 2012. On the occasion of Dussehra in 2011, Shetty initially proposed to Devgn a fourth Golmaal film, but Devgn claimed it "will happen next to next year. It's necessary to have two years gap between the two Golmaal films. It's not good if it comes every year." After the announcement, it was added that Bol Bachchan will be made before the fourth Golmaal film. In January 2011, it was revealed that actress Asin was roped in for the first female lead. Earlier, actress Genelia D'Souza was signed to play the second female lead, but due to her differences with the makers, she opted out of the project and hence the role was offered to Prachi Desai.

As a performer on Comedy Circus, Krushna Abhishek enacted a performance of Shetty never giving him a film role but having promised him in earlier seasons of the show. Impressed by the performance, Shetty decided to give Krushna a role in Bol Bachchan. He also added co-host Archana Puran Singh from the same show to the film cast. It was revealed in the 300th episode special of Comedy Circus, where Shetty was a guest judge, that Paresh Ganatra was among the cast. The film has been shot at various locations, including Shetty's seemingly favourite Panchgani environs, as well as Chomu Palace, among other locations.

== Soundtrack ==
The music of the film was composed by Himesh Reshammiya, while the lyrics were penned by Sajid-Farhad, Shabbir Ahmed, Swanand Kirkire and Sameer. The album was released on 8 June 2012 and included four original soundtracks along with four remix versions of the tracks. Three songs were composed by Reshammiya, of which two were featured in the film and one was listed only in the album; the film marked Reshammiya's reunion with Shetty after his directorial debut Zameen, which coincidentally also starred Bachchan and Devgn. One song, "Nach Le Nach Le", composed by Ajay–Atul was also included in the album. Among the songs, "Jab Se Dekhi Hai" and "Nach Le Nach Le" became moderately popular.

== Release ==
Bol Bachchan was released on 6 July 2012 in 2575 screens in India. Upon release, the film received mixed critical response, but strong box office collections by the end of its first weekend. On the review aggregator website Top10Bollywood, the film scored 2.31, based on 34 reviews.

== Reception ==
=== Critical response ===
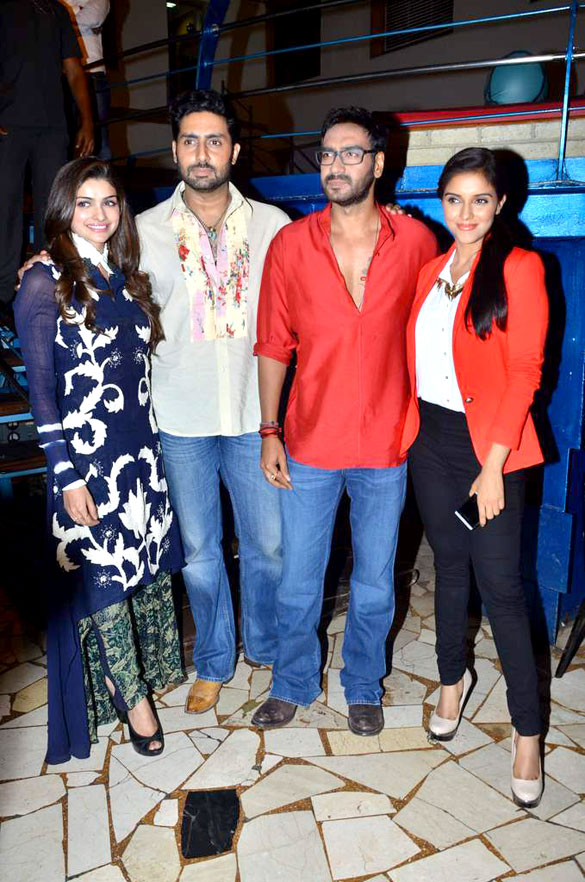
(from left to right) Prachi Desai, Abhishek Bachchan, Ajay Devgn and Asin Thottumkal at the premiere of Bol Bachchan

On the positive side, Taran Adarsh of Bollywood Hungama gave the film 4 out of 5 stars and said, "On the whole, Bol Bachchan is a dhamaal entertainer that has the Rohit Shetty stamp all over it. A film that pays homage to the cinema of the 1970s and 1980s, especially the ones made by Manmohan Desai. Big stars, big visuals, big entertainment, Bol Bachchan has it all." Devesh Sharma of Filmfare also awarded the film 4 out of 5 stars and commented, "How we wish director Rohit Shetty had kept aside his passion of blowing up vehicles wholescale just this once. The exaggerated action scenes eat into the narrative and jar the pace. Would this film be a crowd pleaser– well yes. It's a good leave-your-brains-behind product that Shetty is famous for. There are flashes that suggest he could have gone beyond and made a more polished film but the lure of making a blockbuster proved too much, I guess. The masses would be happy but the same can't be said for the soul of Hrishikesh Mukherjee." Srijana Mitra Das of Times of India gave the film 3.5 out of 5 stars and stated, "Rohit Shetty's latest movie has a constant up-and-down aspect to it, one sequence making you shriek in your seat with laughter, another sending your mind wandering off to the mundane. But at the very heart of things Shetty's madly in love with the movies and BB is his homage to that all-time classic, Golmaal." Mrigank Dhaniwala of Koimoi also gave the film 3.5 out of 5 stars and concluded, "On the whole, Bol Bachchan delivers entertainment in huge dollops. For that, it will earn the love of the paying public and will have a successful run at the box-office." Gaurav Malani of Times of India gave the film a positive feedback and said, "For a (pleasant) change, Rohit Shetty doesn't do Golmaal 'his' style. Rather he does Golmaal in its 'original' form and that's what creates a decent difference, making Bol Bachchan fairly entertaining!".

Sukanya Verma of Rediff gave the film 2.5 out of 5 stars and stated, "Bol Bachchan is dispensable cinema, forgotten almost immediately after it's over. What I kept wondering is how does Asrani who acted in Mukerjee's acclaimed films like Chupke Chupke (1975), Abhimaan (1973) and Bawarchi (1972) feel about working in the remake of a film where the hero wore his kurta. Don't know what I'm talking about? You deserve Bol Bachchan. But if you do, you must have already begun scouting for your copy of Gol Maal somewhere." Shubhra Gupta of The Indian Express gave the film 2.5 out of 5 stars and commented, "If your nosy is not turned up too high, Bol Bachchan, less blaring than your standard Rohit Shetty comedy, can give you sporadic chuckles, and a few helpless laughs. Can't expect more." Vinayak Chakravorthy of India Today gave the film 2.5 out of 5 stars and concluded, "Far from being LOL stuff, Bol Bachchan ends up being Bore Bachchan, with a lame climax."

The film received some negative reviews. Rajeev Masand of CNN-IBN gave the film 2 out of 5 stars and said, "Even if you're a fan of Rohit Shetty's cinema, it's unlikely your chest will become a blouse over this one!" Blessy Chettiar of DNA India gave the film 2 out of 5 stars and commented, "If you liked the Shetty Golmaals and Singham, this review will only be bol bachchan for you. Have fun while it lasts." Aniruddha Guha of DNA India gave the film 2 out of 5 stars and stated, "Bol Bachchan, overall, falls short of being a laugh riot in spite of having the ammunition for it. In its current form, it's best enjoyed inebriated." Anupama Chopra of Hindustan Times gave the film 2 out of 5 stars and said, "There is no attempt at plotting, storytelling, delineating a character, building coherence or following logic. Shetty’s only agenda is to give you a good time." Saibal Chatterjee of NDTV gave the film 1.5 out of 5 stars and concluded that "Bol Bachchan is a comedy so absurd that it could reduce you to tears of despair. Conversely, if you have the stomach for such rampant silliness, it might propel you into paroxysms of delight. The call is entirely yours." Kunal Guha of Yahoo! India rated the movie 1 out of 5 stars and said, "Bol Bachchan (BB) jams chopsticks up the nose of Hrishikesh Mukherjee's comic classic Gol Maal and digs itself six feet under with it. While the story is the same in theory, being a Rohit Shetty film only adds some cars nailing somersaults, trucks attempting a ballet, baddies playing mid-air Garba after being biffed and Ajay Devgn drawing his eyebrows close enough to show that he means business."

== Awards and nominations ==
Awards	Category	Recipients and nominees	Results
Screen Awards	Best Comedian	Abhishek Bachchan	Won
Stardust Awards	Best Actor - Comedy or Romance	Abhishek Bachchan	Won
Zee Cine Awards	Best Comedian	Abhishek Bachchan	Won
Zee Cine Awards	Power Club - Box Office Award	Rohit Shetty	Won
Zee Cine Awards	Best Dialogue	Farhad Samji and Sajid	Nominated
BIG Star Entertainment Awards	Most Entertaining Actor in a Comic Role	Abhishek Bachchan	Won
Producers Guild Film Awards	Best Comedian	Abhishek Bachchan	Won
Producers Guild Film Awards	Best Comedian	Krushna Abhishek	Nominated
Times of India Film Awards	Best Comedian	Abhishek Bachchan	Won
International Indian Film Academy Awards	Best Performance in a Comic Role	Abhishek Bachchan	Won
Bollywood Hungama Surfers Choice Movie Awards	Best Comedian	Abhishek Bachchan	Won

== Box office ==
=== India ===
Bol Bachchan opened better at single screens as compared to multiplexes. Single screens on average opened to around 70% mark while multiplexes were more closer to the 60% mark. Bol Bachchan collected around ₹113 million (US$1.2 million) nett on its first day. Bol Bachchan had a good jump on Sunday as it grossed around ₹148 million (US$1.6 million) nett for a ₹380 million (US$4.1 million) nett weekend. The film collected ₹60 million (US$640,000) on Monday. Bol Bachchan has come into its own on Tuesday with strong collections of around ₹57.5 million (US$610,000) nett and a total of ₹500 million (US$5.3 million) nett in five days. Bol Bachchan has had a good first week and collected ₹600 million (US$6.4 million) nett. The first week collections of Bol Bachchan are better than Singham but less than Golmaal 3. Bol Bachchan collected around ₹32.5 million (US$350,000) nett on its second Friday. It is a 70% drop from its first day as multiplex business was hit by the new release Cocktail but single screen business remained good. The film has collected around ₹630 million (US$6.7 million) nett in eight days. Bol Bachchan crossed the ₹750 million (US$8.0 million) nett mark in ten days as it grossed ₹148 million (US$1.6 million) nett approx over the weekend. Bol Bachchan grossed around ₹223 million (US$2.4 million) nett in its second week taking its two-week total to ₹830 million (US$8.9 million) nett. Bol Bachchan grossed ₹97.5 million (US$1.0 million) nett approx in week three, thus taken its total to ₹928 million (US$9.9 million). Bol Bachchan had grossed ₹1 billion (US$11 million) at the end of its run in domestic market. Its final distributor share was around ₹528 million (US$5.6 million).

=== Overseas ===
Bol Bachchan had a decent opening overseas of around $2 million. UAE was good as comedy films do better in that market. Bol Bachchan has grossed ₹207 million (US$2.2 million) in 17 days. Finally, the film netted US$4 million overseas.

== See also ==
- List of highest-grossing Bollywood films
