= Fuge =

Fuge can refer to:

- German for fugue, a type of music
- Fuge Camps, series of Christian summer camps
- Fuge (surname)
