= Aditi Bhatia =

Indian actress (born 1999)

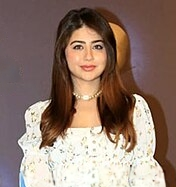
- Bhatia in 2025
- Born: 29 October 1999 (age 26)
- Occupation: Actress
- Years active: 2004–present
- Known for: Yeh Hai Mohabbatein

Aditi Bhatia (born 29 October 1999) is an Indian actress, well known for playing Ruhi Bhalla in Star Plus's Yeh Hai Mohabbatein.

== Early life and education ==
Bhatia completed her intermediate studies from the Maharashtra State Board of Secondary and Higher Secondary Education in 2018.

== Career ==
Bhatia started off her career as a child actor, having featured in the advertisements followed by various films like Vivah, Shootout at Lokhandwala, The Train, Chance Pe Dance, and Sargoshiyan.

In 2015, Bhatia portrayed Bubbly Taneja in Zee TV's Tashan-e-Ishq. From 2016 to 2019, she portrayed Ruhi Bhalla in Ye Hai Mohabbatein on StarPlus.

She has also participated in Comedy Nights Bachao Taaza, Comedy Circus, and Khatra Khatra Khatra.

== Filmography ==
=== Films ===
Year	Title	Role	Notes	Ref.
2006	Vivah	Young Rajni "Chhoti"	Cameo	
2007	Shootout at Lokhandwala	A.A. Khan's daughter	Cameo	
2007	The Train	Nikki	Cameo	
2010	Chance Pe Dance	Shanaya	Cameo	
2017	Sargoshiyan	Payal	Cameo	
2026	The Kerala Story 2	Divya Paliwal	Lead	

=== Television ===
Year	Title	Role	Notes	Ref.
2004	Home Sweet Home	Karishma		
2006	Ghar Ki Lakshmi Betiyann	Unnamed	Cameo	
2008	Tujh Sang Preet Lagai Sajna	Tulsi		
2015	Tashan-e-Ishq	Bubbly Taneja		
2016–2019	Yeh Hai Mohabbatein	Ruhi Bhalla		
2016	Comedy Nights Bachao Taaza	Child comedian		
2018	Comedy Circus	Child comedian		
2019	Khatra Khatra Khatra	Herself	Guest appearance	
2019	Apna News Aayega	Herself		

=== Music videos ===
Year	Title	Singer	Ref.
2019	Neendon Se Breakup	Nikhil D'Souza	
