= 19th Indian Telly Awards =

Indian Television Award Show 2025

- Awarded for: Achievements in Television
- Date: 23 July 2025
- Site: Mumbai
- Hosted by: Sandiip Sikcand; Zeeshan Khan
- Produced by: ITV 2.0
- Organized by: Indiantelevision.com

Highlights
- Best Drama Serial: Yeh Rishta Kya Kehlata Hai
- Best Actor: Kanwar Dhillon (Udne Ki Aasha)
- Best Actress: Deepika Singh Goyal (Mangal Lakshmi)

Television coverage
- Channel: Zee5
- Network: Zee Entertainment Enterprises

The 2025 Indian Telly Awards, officially the 19th Indian Telly Awards ceremony, presented by the Indiantelevision.com honouring Indian television shows of 2024 took place on 23 July 2025 in Mumbai. The ceremony was televised in India and internationally on Zee5. Actors Sandiip Sikcand and Zeeshan Khan hosted the ceremony.

== Shows ==
Awards	Show	Channel	Ref
Best Daily Serial	Yeh Rishta Kya Kehlata Hai	StarPlus	
Best Cookery Show	Star vs Food (season 2)	Discovery+	
Best Drama Series	Anupamaa	StarPlus	
Best Dance Talent Show	Dance Plus Pro	StarPlus	
Best Documentary	Kargil 1999- The Untold Story of the Indian Air Force	ZEE5	
Best Edutainment / Science / Knowledge Based Show	History Hunter	Discovery+	
Best Historical Series	History Hunter	Discovery+	
Best Programme with Social Message (Non Fiction)	OMG! Yeh Mera India (season 10)	History TV18	
Best Reality Show	Star vs Food (season 2)	Discovery+	
Best Sports Show	Wrestling My Family	Olympic Channel	
Best Thriller/ Horror Show	Qayaamat Se Qayaamat Tak	Colors TV	
Fan Favorite Show - Fiction	Anupamaa	StarPlus	
Fan Favorite Show - Non Fiction	Bigg Boss 18	Colors TV	

== Jury awards ==
Awards	Show	Awardee(s)	Ref
Best Actor In A Lead Role	Udne Ki Aasha	Kanwar Dhillon	
Best Actor in a Comic Role	Bhabi Ji Ghar Par Hai	Aashif Sheikh	
Best Actor in a Negative Role	Pushpa Impossible	Hemant Kher	
Best Actor in a Supporting Role	Shrimad Ramayan	Arav Chowdharry	
Best Actor in a Supporting Role (Comedy)	Taarak Mehta Ka Ooltah Chashmah	Dayashankar Pandey	
Best Actress In A Lead Role	Mangal Lakshmi	Deepika Singh Goyal	
Best Actress in a Comic Role	Bhabi Ji Ghar Par Hai	Shubhangi Atre Poorey	
Best Actress in a Negative Role	Mera Balam Thanedaar	Srishti Singh	
Best Actress in a Supporting Role	Pushpa Impossible	Ketki Dave	
Best Actress in a Supporting Role	Wagle Ki Duniya	Bharti Achrekar	
Best Anchor	Secrets of the Buddha Relics	Manoj Bajpayee	
Best Comedian	Laughter Chefs Unlimited Entertainment	Krushna Abhishek	
Best Onscreen Couple	Udne Ki Aasha	Neha Harsora Kanwar Dhillon	
Best Producer (Fiction)	Pushpa Impossible	Jamnadas Majethia Aatish Kapadia	
Best Producer (Non Fiction)	Laughter Chefs Unlimited Entertainment	Vipul D. Shah	

== Popular awards ==
Awards	Show	Awardee(s)	Ref
Fan Favorite Actor	Yeh Rishta Kya Kehlata Hai	Rohit Purohit	
Fan Favorite Actress	Anupamaa	Rupali Ganguly	
Fan Favorite Comedy Actor	Taarak Mehta Ka Ooltah Chashmah	Dilip Joshi	
Fan Favorite Comedy Actress	Wagle Ki Duniya	Bhakti Chauhan	
Fan Favorite Jodi - Fiction	Jhanak	Krushal Ahuja Hiba Nawab	
Fan Favorite Jodi - Non Fiction	Laughter Chefs Unlimited Entertainment	Kashmera Shah Krushna Abhishek	
Fan Favorite Negative Actor	Megha Barsenge	Kinshuk Mahajan	
Fan Favorite Negative Actress	Suman Indori	Anita Hassanandani Reddy	
Fan Favorite Supporting Actor	Udne Ki Aasha	Sanjay Narvekar	
Fan Favorite Supporting Actress	Yeh Rishta Kya Kehlata Hai	Garvita Sadhwani	
Fan Favourite Star - Colors	Suman Indori	Zain Imam	
Fan Favourite Star - Dangal	Mann Atisundar	Manan Joshi	
Fan Favourite Star - Sab TV	Wagle Ki Duniya	Sumeet Raghavan	
Fan Favourite Star - Star Plus	Iss Ishq Ka Rabb Rakha	Fahmaan Khan	
Fan Favourite Star - Zee	Kaise Mujhe Tum Mil Gaye	Sriti Jha	

== Editorial Choice awards ==
Awards	Awardee(s)	Notes	Ref
Entertainment Personality of The Year	Bharti Singh		
Leading Lady	Ankita Lokhande		
Most Outstanding Performance	Shivangi Joshi	Barsatein - Mausam Pyaar Ka	
Most Versatile Performer on Television - Male	Karan Kundrra		
Outstanding Performance in Non-Fiction	Karan Veer Mehra	Bigg Boss 18	
Rising Star	Samridhii Shukla	Yeh Rishta Kya Kehlata Hai	
Style & Substance Star	Tejasswi Prakash		

== Special awards ==
Awards	Awardee(s	Ref
Ramanand Sagar Lifetime Achievement Award	Shobha Kapoor	
Fan Favorite TV Personality of the year!	Vivian Dsena	

== Technical awards ==
Awards	Show	Awardee(s)	Ref
Best Art Direction (Fiction)	Wagle Ki Duniya	Jayant Deshmukh Manish Shirke	
Best Costume Design	Shrimad Ramayan	Shibapriya Sen	
Best Dialogue Writer	Pushpa Impossible	Tushar Ishwar Sneha Desai	
Best Editor (Fiction)	Shrimad Ramayan	Ganga Kacharla	
Best Screenplay Writer	Yeh Rishta Kya Kehlata Hai	Bhavna Vyas	
Best Scriptwriter (Non-Fiction)	Laughter Chefs – Unlimited Entertainment	Vankush Arora	
Best Sitcom/Comedy Writer	Taarak Mehta Ka Ooltah Chashmah	Jitu Parmar,Yogesh Mehra,Manish Tiwari,Rajen Upadhyay,Raju Odedra	
Best Special/Visual Effects	Shiv Shakti - Tap Tyaag Taandav	Chirag Chandrakant Bhuva	
Best Story Writer	Wagle Ki Duniya	Pariva Pranati	
Best TV Cameraman (Fiction)	Udne Ki Aasha	Dannie	
