= Dhammal with Pati Patni Aur Panga – Jodiyon Ka Reality Check =

Indian Celebrity-based reality show

- Genre: Reality; Game show
- Created by: Nikul C. Desai
- Presented by: Sonali Bendre; Munawar Faruqui
- Country of origin: India
- Original language: Hindi
- No. of seasons: 2
- No. of episodes: 45

Production
- Producer: Nikul C. Desai
- Camera setup: Multi-camera
- Running time: 70-90 min.
- Production company: Story Weaver Collective

Original release
- Network: Colors TV; JioHotstar
- Release: 2 August 2025 – present

Dhamaal with Pati Patni Aur Panga – Jodiyon Ka Reality Check is an Indian Hindi-language reality game show produced by Story Weaver Collective. Featuring celebrity couples, the series premiered on 2 August 2025 and is hosted by Sonali Bendre and Munawar Faruqui.

== Series overview ==
Series overview
Series	Host	Episodes	Originally released			Winner	Runner-up
Series	Host	Episodes	First released	Last released	Network	Winner	Runner-up
1	Munawar Faruqui; Sonali Bendre	32	2 August 2025	16 November 2025	Colors TV; JioHotstar	Abhinav Shukla; Rubina Dilaik	Gurmeet Choudhary; Debina Bonnerjee
2	Munawar Faruqui; Sonali Bendre	13	10 October 2026	TBA	Colors TV; JioHotstar	TBA	TBA

== Format ==
Each episode of Pati Patni Aur Panga features different themes and games designed to test the compatibility and relationship dynamics of the participating couples. The couples take part in "reality checks" and various challenges presented in different game formats, with the winning couple awarded the "Shaadi Ka Laddu". The show also features light-hearted arguments, romantic exchanges and humorous interactions, offering an insight into the relationships of the participating celebrity couples.

== Season 1 ==
Contestant	Status	Laddus	Ref.
Abhinav Shukla; Rubina Dilaik	Winner	×39	
Gurmeet Choudhary; Debina Bonnerjee	Runner-up	×38	
Pawan Kumar; Geeta Phogat	3rd Place	×36	
Fahad Ahmad; Swara Bhasker	4th Place	×34	
Rocky Jaiswal; Hina Khan	5th Place	×21	
Milind Chandwani; Avika Gor	6th Place	×17	
Sudesh Lehri; Mamta Lehri	7th Place	×14	
Abhishek Kumar; Isha Malviya	Panga^{1}	*	

1. Exes Abhishek Kumar and Isha Malviya were introduced as the 'Panga' element in episode 10.

=== Guest appearances ===
Episodes	Guest(s)	Notes	Ref.
17	Neha Kakkar	To promote her song Tu Pyaasa Hai	
18	Radhe Maa	To predict couples future	
20	Tejasswi Prakash Karan Kundrra	For Avika and Milind Sangeet	
22	Farah Khan Rakhi Sawant	For Avika and Milind Pehli Rasoi	
23	Mallika Sherawat	To celebrate Diwali	
24	Ekta Kapoor	To celebrate Diwali and promote her app AstroVani	
26	Shehnaaz Gill	To promote her film Ikk Kudi	
29	Elvish Yadav Jannat Zubair Rahmani Karan Kundrra Tejasswi Prakash	To Promote Laughter Chefs – Unlimited Entertainment	
29	Priyanka Chahar Choudhary	To promote Naagin 7	

=== Reception ===
Pati Patni Aur Panga received mixed reviews from critics. India Today criticised the show’s execution, stating that its format lacked freshness and emotional depth, while also commenting on the contrasting hosting styles of Sonali Bendre and Munawar Faruqui. India Forums praised Munawar Faruqui’s hosting and the performances of Rubina Dilaik and Sudesh Lehri, while criticising the show’s inconsistent humour and use of double entendre.

== Season 2 ==
Contestants	Status	Laddus	Ref.
Arjun Bijlani; Neha Swami			
Manoj Tiwari; Surbhi Tiwari			
Parmeet Sethi; Archana Puran Singh			
Rahul Vadiya; Disha Parmar			
Rohit Raj Goyal; Deepika Singh			
Shabir Ahluwalia; Kanchi Kaul			
Vivek Dahiya; Divyanka Tripathi			

=== Guest appearances ===
Episodes	Guest(s)	Notes	Ref.
10	Eisha Singh; Avinash Mishra	To celebrate Diwali	
