= Shravani =

Indian drama television series

- Genre: Drama
- Screenplay by: Neelam Pandey
- Story by: Raghuveer Shekhawat; Nagin Mirza
- Directed by: Ravindra Gautam; Amar Varpe
- Creative director: Neelam Daswani
- Starring: Sonal Khilwani; Mohit Sonkar; Gaurika Sharma; Arti Singh; Preetika Chauhan
- Country of origin: India
- Original language: Hindi
- No. of episodes: 282

Production
- Executive producer: Neelkamal
- Producers: Raghuveer Shekhawat; Ravindra Gautam; Sushant Kumar
- Editors: Sagar Patil; Manish Upadhyay
- Running time: 20-24 minutes
- Production company: Do Dooni 4 Films LLP

Original release
- Network: Shemaroo Umang
- Release: 24 April 2023 – 16 March 2024

Shravani is an Indian drama television series aired on Shemaroo Umang from 24 April 2023 to 16 March 2024. It stars Sonal Khilwani, Mohit Sonkar and Arti Singh. It was Produced by Do Dhooni 4 Films.

The show is also dubbed into Malayalam as Aval Oru Devatha on Flowers TV from 13 May 2024 to 14 June 2024.

== Plot ==
Shravani is a story about a girl who helps her blind parents in every situation. She cares for them deeply and strives to do everything she can to support them.

== Cast ==
=== Main ===
- Sonal Khilwani as Shravani Thakur / Shravani Shivansh Singh: Keshav and Netra's daughter; Bunty and Sweety's elder cousin; Harshvardhan's elder granddaughter; Shivansh's wife; Lal and Vasudha's daughter–in–law; Sneha's sister–in–law (2023–2024)
  - Gaurika Sharma as Child Shravani Thakur (2023)
- Preetika Chauhan as Netra Keshav Thakur: Keshav's wife; Shravani's mother; Shivansh's mother–in–law (2023)
- Vicky Singh Kashyap as Keshav Thakur: Harshvardhan's younger son; Bhanu and Sharad's younger brother; Bhavana and Pankhuri's elder brother; Netra's husband; Shravani's father; Shivansh's father–in–law (2023) (Dead)
- Arti Singh as Chandra Bhanu Thakur: Sapera's daughter; Viren's younger sister; Bhanu's wife; Bunty and Sweety's mother; Sneha's mother–in–law (2023–2024)
- Mohit Sonkar as Shivansh Singh: Lal and Vasudha's son; Sneha's elder brother; Shravani's husband; Keshav and Netra's son–in–law; Bunty and Sweety's brother–in–law (2023–2024)

=== Recurring ===
- Shamik Abbas as Bhanu Thakur: Harshvardhan's elder son; Sharad, Keshav, Bhavana and Pankhuri's elder brother; Chandra's husband; Bunty and Sweety's father; Viren's brother–in–law; Sneha's father–in–law (2023–2024)
- Shivanshi Das as Sweety Thakur: Bhanu and Chandra's daughter; Bunty's younger sister; Harshvardhan's younger granddaughter; Shravani's younger cousin; Shivansh and Sweety's sister–in–law (2023–2024)
- Vedant Saluja as Bunty Thakur: Bhanu and Chandra's son; Sweety's elder brother; Harshvardhan's grandson; Shravani's younger cousin; Sneha's husband; Lal and Vasudha's son–in–law (2023–2024)
  - Subhan Khan as Child Bunty Thakur (2023)
- Simran Sharma as Sneha Singh / Sneha Bunty Thakur: Lal and Vasudha's daughter; Shivansh's younger sister; Bunty's wife; Bhanu and Chandra's daughter–in–law; Shravani and Swwty's sister–in–law (2023–2024)
- Vikas Grover as Sharad Thakur: Harshvardhan's middle son; Bhanu's younger brother; Keshav, Bhavana and Pankhuri's elder brother; Veena and Preeti's husband (2023)
- Shivani Chakraborty as Bhavana Thakur: Harshvardhan's elder daughter; Bhanu, Sharad and Keshav's younger sister; Pankhuri's elder sister (2023)
- Khushboo Moharkar / Simran Tomar as Pankhuri Thakur: Harshvardhan's younger daughter; Bhanu, Sharad, Keshav and Bhavana's younger sister; Roopesh's wife (2023) / (2023)
- Rajat Sain as Roopesh: Pankhuri's husband (2023)
- Manmohan Tiwari as Viren: Chandra's elder brother; Bhanu's brother–in–law; Bunty and Sweety's maternal uncle (2023)
- Pawan Mahendru as Harshvardhan Thakur: Bhanu, Sharad, Keshav, Bhavana and Pankhuri's father; Shravani, Sweety and Bunty's grandfather (2023)
- Roopa Divetia as Mrs. Thakur: Harshvardhan's wife; Bhanu, Sharad, Keshav, Bhavana and Pankhuri's mother; Shravani, Sweety and Bunty's grandmother (2023) (Dead)
- Hina Vajpayee as Veena Sharad Thakur: Sharad's first wife (2023)
- Bhawna Singh as Preeti Sharad Thakur: Sharad's second wife (2023)
- Tejaswini Singh
- Amita Khopkar as Mrs. Singh: Lal's mother; Vasudha's mother-in-law; Shivansh and Shreya's grandmother (2023–2024)
- Arshi Khan as Julie: A private detective (2023)
- Deepjyoti Das as Lal Singh: Vasudha's husband; Shivansh and Sneha's father; Shravani and Bunty's father–in–law (2023) (Dead)
- Manish Goplani as Rohan Thakur (2023–2024)
- Ajay Raju as Sapera (snake poison seller)

== Production ==
Arti Singh Made debut in a negative role.

In April 2023 Blind students performs a skit to mark rollout of show Shravani. Shravani is inspired by the character of Shravana Kumara from Ramayana.
