= Arti Singh =

Indian television actress (born 1985)

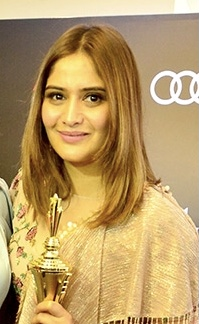
- Singh in 2020
- Born: Arti Sharma; 5 April 1985 (age 41); Lucknow, Uttar Pradesh, India
- Occupation: Actress
- Years active: 2007–present
- Known for: Thoda Hai Bas Thode Ki Zaroorat Hai; Parichay; Waaris; Bigg Boss 13
- Spouse: Deepak Chauhan (m. 2024)
- Relatives: Krishna Abhishek (brother); Kashmera Shah (sister-in-law); Govinda (uncle)
- Family: See Govinda family

Arti Singh Sharma (born 5 April 1985) is an Indian actress who works in Hindi television. She made her acting debut in 2007 with Star Plus's drama series Maayka. In 2019, Arti participated in Bigg Boss 13 and emerged as 4th runner up. Singh is best known for her portrayals in Colors TV's dramas Thoda Hai Bas Thode Ki Zaroorat Hai, and Parichay and & TV's drama series Waaris.

== Early life ==
Aarti Singh was born on 5 April 1985 in Lucknow, to Atmaprakash Sharma, who was originally from Dhami, Shimla.

She is the niece of Govinda (actor), sister of comedian Krushna Abhishek and cousin of TV actressesRagini Khanna and Soumya Seth. She belongs to the Govinda Family in the Bollywood.

== Personal life ==
Singh married businessman Deepak Chauhan in April 2024 at the ISKCON Temple in Juhu, Mumbai.

== Career ==
Singh started her acting career with the Zee TV show Maayka, where she portrayed the role of Soni in 2007. Later, she was seen playing Rano in Star Plus's show Grihasti, followed by Thoda Hai Bas Thode Ki Zaroorat Hai as Mugdha.

In 2011, she portrayed the role of Seema in Ekta Kapoor's show Parichay — Nayee Zindagi Kay Sapno Ka. She later portrayed the role of Kajri in Colors TV's Uttaran. In 2014, she appeared in the show Devon Ke Dev...Mahadev as Baani and later participated in the reality show Box Cricket League.

After appearing in comedy shows Killerr Karaoke Atka Toh Latkah, Comedy Classes and Comedy Nights Bachao, she played the role of a ghost in Sasural Simar Ka in 2016. She later was seen as the main lead in &TV's Waaris as Amba from 2016 to 2017.

In 2019, she participated in the reality show Bigg Boss 13 and emerged as the fourth runner-up. In this show, she revealed that she suffered depression due to lack of work for 2 years. Singh returned to television after a long break of 3 years, making her debut in a negative character named Chandra Bhanu Thakur in Shemaroo Umang's Shravani.

== Filmography ==
=== Television ===
Year	Serial	Role	Notes	Ref
2007	Maayka	Soni Malhotra Khurana		
2008–2009	Grihasti	Rano Manas Ahuja		
2010	Thoda Hai Bas Thode Ki Zaroorat Hai	Mugdha Shreekant Kulkarni		
2011–2013	Parichay	Seema Garewal Chopra		
2013–2014	Uttaran	Kajri Yadav		
2014	Devon Ke Dev...Mahadev	Vaani		
2014	Encounter	Mandakini Zaveri		
2016	Sasural Simar Ka	Madhavi		
2016–2017	Waaris	Amba Dhillon Pawania		
2018	Vikram Betaal Ki Rahasya Gatha	Shachi / Draupadi		
2019	Udaan	Poonam Jatin Shroff		
2019–2020	Bigg Boss 13	Contestant	4th runner-up	
2023-2024	Shravani	Chandra Bhanu Thakur		

==== Special appearances ====
Year	Title	Role	Ref
2015	Killerr Karaoke Atka Toh Latkah	Herself	
2016	Comedy Nights Bachao	Herself	
2016	Gangaa	Amba Dhillon Pawania	
2016	Santoshi Maa	Amba Dhillon Pawania	
2016	Badho Bahu	Amba Dhillon Pawania	
2017	Badho Bahu	Amba Dhillon Pawania	
2020	Bigg Boss 14	Herself	
2022	Bigg Buzz	Herself	
2024	Laughter Chefs – Unlimited Entertainment	Herself	

=== Films ===
Year	Title	Role	Notes	Ref
2009	Aladin	News Reader		
2022	Gudgudi	Kalpana	Short film	
2022	Haldi	Pallavi	Short film	

== Awards and nominations ==
Year	Awards	Category	Work	Results	Ref.
2012	Indian Telly Awards	Best Actress in a Supporting Role	Parichay	Nominated	
2017	Gold Awards	Best Actress in a Supporting Role	Waaris	Nominated	
