= Krazzy Kiya Re =

- Genre: Reality
- Country of origin: India
- Original language: Hindi

Airtel Krazzy Kiya Re also known as KKR and broadcast on DD National is an Indian 2008 dance reality show with comedy. It consistently remained in top five in the TRP chart.

The show was produced by known production and post-production house Prime Focus and directed by Gyan Sahay. The show was hosted by two anchors Sahitya Sahay and Agastya Jain and judged by Sudha Chandran, Krushna Abhishek, Bakhtiyaar Irani and Habiba Rahman.
