= Sargoshiyan =

- Theatrical release poster
- Directed by: Vijay Verma; Imran Khan
- Produced by: Imran Khan
- Starring: Imran Khan; Farida Jalal; Alok Nath; Tom Alter
- Music by: Aslam Surty
- Production company: Imran Khans Productions
- Distributed by: Dimension Pictures
- Release date: 26 May 2017
- Country: India
- Language: Hindi

Sargoshiyan (English: Whispers) is a 2017 Indian drama film directed and produced by Imran Khan under his banner Imran Khans Production. The film is completely shot in Kashmir and explores the never seen before breath taking places. The film was released on 26 May 2017 by Dimension Pictures. It received Mixed Reviews from Critics.

== Synopsis ==
The story of the film is weaved around Kashmir and Kashmiri people's simplicity, pride and Kashmiriyat. It's a very simple and interesting theme, all about Kashmir where Jammu and Kashmir and the Kashmiri people are central to certain developments taking place in the movie. In the recent past, Kashmir has been portrayed in many films for the unrest in the region, however in this film there is no violence and the movie depicts the beauty and chastity of Kashmir and Kashmiris. The movie portrays how even today Muslims and Pandit's stay in harmony in the Kashmir Valley. The film travels through many beautiful locations in Kashmir. It's a soul-searching journey for the characters where they meet different people undergoing their challenges in very difficult conditions and yet they are positive, hopeful and facing the harsh realities of life with a 'never say die' attitude.

== Cast ==
- Alok Nath as Pandit Raina
- Farida Jalal as Rahima
- Imran Khan as Imran Dar
- Indraneil Sengupta as Vikram Roy
- Shahbaz Khan as Hamza Gujjar
- Aditi Bhatia as Payal
- Sara Khan as Sheena Oberoi
- Tom Alter as Alan Alter
- Hasan Zaidi as Aryan Raina
- Aparna Kumar as Ragini
- Khalid Siddiqui as Bank Manager
- Zameer Ashai as Historian Sarfaraz Sahab
- GM Wani as Ghulam Chacha
- Zahoor Zaidi as Nabeer, a houseboat owner
