= Thoda Hai Bas Thode Ki Zaroorat Hai =

Indian drama television series

- Genre: Drama
- Written by: Rahool Bose, Jitesh Patel, Nikhil Dev, Pallavi Karkera, Deepak Venkateshan
- Creative directors: Sandiip Sickand, Namita
- Starring: See below
- Opening theme: "Thoda Hai Bas Thode Ki Zaroorat Hai" by ??
- Country of origin: India
- Original language: Hindi
- No. of seasons: 01
- No. of episodes: 115

Production
- Camera setup: Multi-camera
- Running time: Approx. 24 minutes

Original release
- Network: Colors TV
- Release: 7 June – 12 November 2010

Thoda Hai Bas Thode Ki Zaroorat Hai (transl. There Is A Little There Is A Need Of A Little More) is an Indian family soap opera that aired on Colors TV in 2010. Produced by Goldie Behl, the serial depicts the life of an ordinary family in Maharashtra. The programme stars Arti Singh in her first lead role.

== Plot ==
It is the story of the Kulkarni's, a middle class Maharashtrian family living in Shivaji Park, Mumbai. The story is through the eyes of Mughdha who believes in high thinking but a modest small living. Thoda Hai Bas Thode Ki Zaroorat Hai portrays the struggle of this middle-class family as they face a materialistic world and constant clashes between old age ideologies and modern thinking.

== Cast ==
- Arti Singh as Mugdha Shreekant Kulkarni
- Romit Raaj as Nishikant Kulkarni
- Sonali Nikam as Devki Nishikant Kulkarni
- Priyamvada Kant as Pragya Nishikant Kulkarni (Nishikant's ex-wife)
- Sachin Shroff as Shreekant Kulkarni
- Pradeep Shembekar as Umakant Kulkarni (Kaka)
- Asawari Joshi as Prabha Umakant Kulkarni (Kaki)
- Akanksha Juneja as Akshata Kulkarni
- Neena Kulkarni as Sulekha Kulkarni
- Yasir Shah as Sambhav (Akshata's boyfriend)
- Shreya Bugade as Sangana
- Aarav Singh as Giriraj (Sangana's husband)
