= Rehman Khan =

Indian comedian and actor

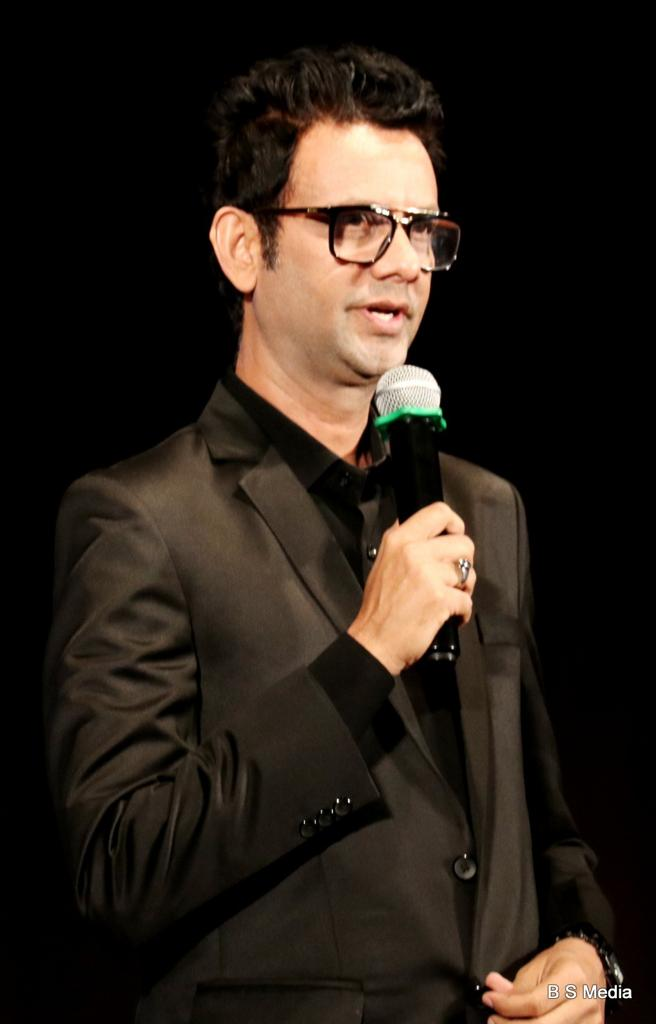

Rehman Khan (born 21 August 1979) is an Indian stand-up comedian and film actor.

== Early life and education ==
Khan was born and brought up in a conservative family in Mumbai, India. He studied at Karthika High School and graduated from R.D. National College, Mumbai with a first class in history. In school he used to crack jokes in class and mimic teachers and was well known as a comedian. By the time he was in college he became popular among friends for comedy, mimicry, and imitating teachers and actors.

== Career ==
He began uploading stand-up comedy videos to YouTube in 2018. He is known for his sarcasm, satire, and unique style of delivering punches. As of March 2023, he has more than 4,52,000 subscribers and a combined more than 36 million views on his YouTube channel.

He has also worked with NGO Salaam Baalak Trust and Salaam Bombay Foundation and has performed more than 1000 shows of a play based on Anti-Tobacco. Khan has performed many inter-college and professional plays as an actor, writer, and director in Hindi, English, and Urdu and has anchored many live orchestras.

Initially he faced a strong opposition from elders of his family as his family was not connected to film, TV, or theater before. However, later his career was accepted as he grew in popularity and began to make his living from stand-up comedy.

== Shows ==
Currently Rehman Khan can be seen performing in The Kapil Sharma Show as a duo with Kiku Sharda as historical characters King Akbar and his son Salim. He has participated in Comedy Circus 2 (2008), Comedy Circus Chincpokli to China, Comedy Circus 20–20 with Rakshanda Khan, Comedy Circus Mahasangram with Karishma Tanna, Jubilee Comedy Circus with Saloni Daini, Comedy Ke Superstars with Usha Nadkarni, Kahani Comedy Circus Ki with Ragini Khanna, and Comedy Circus 3 Ka Tadka (2009) with Anoop Soni and Shweta Tiwari on Sony Television.

Rehman was also part of a Star One show, The Great Indian Laughter Challenge season 3,4 and 5 Winner Comedy Champions on Sahara TV, Chote Miya Bade Miya on Colors TV, Comedy Ka Maha Muqabala on Star Plus, Nautanki - The Comedy Theatre on Colors TV (2013), Mad in India with Sunil Grover on Star Plus (2014), Yam Hain Hum on SAB TV (2015), The Great Indian Family Drama on SAB TV with Archana Puran Singh and Satish Kaushik (2016), and Comedy Dangal on And TV with Bharti Singh and Anu Malik (2017).
