= Aarav Singh =

Indian television actor

- Born: Jaipur, Rajasthan, India
- Occupations: Actor; model
- Years active: 2010–present
- Spouse: Neha Choudhary
- Website: aaravsingh.in

Aarav Singh is an Indian television actor. He is known for his role of ACP Sameer Rane in Pavitra Rishta. He also played a negative lead on Colors Thoda Hai Bas Thode Ki Zaroorat Hai.

== Personal life ==
He was born on 7 April 1988 into a Gujjar family of Rajasthan (Jaipur, India). He is married to Neha Choudhary in February 2020.

== Television ==
Aarav made his acting debut with the negative lead role of Thoda Hai Bas Thode Ki Zaroorat Hai on Colors in 2010. Aarav played an ACP role in Pavitra Rishta on Zee Tv

| Year | Serial | Role | Channel |
|---|---|---|---|
| 2010 | Thoda Hai Bas Thode Ki Zaroorat Hai | Giriraj | Colors |
| 2012 | Pavitra Rishta | Sameer Rane | Zee TV |
| 2013 | Encounter | Nisaar Khaan | Sony TV |
| 2014 | Kumkum Bhagya | himself | Zee TV |
| 2015 | Kalash – Ek Vishwaas | Suraj sahu | life OK |
| 2016 | Yeh Hai Mohabbatein | Police Officer | Star Plus |
