= Entertainment Ke Liye Kuch Bhi Karega =

- Presented by: Mona Singh (season 1-5); Vishal Malhotra (season 1-4); Krushna Abhishek (season 5)
- Judges: Salman Khan; Shoib Malik
- Country of origin: India
- No. of seasons: 5

Production
- Production locations: Mumbai, India

Original release
- Network: Sony Entertainment Television
- Release: 25 May 2009 – 10 June 2014

Entertainment Ke Liye Kuch Bhi Karega (transl. Will do anything for the entertainment) is an Indian variety entertainment reality show that aired on Sony TV on weekdays. It premiered on 25 May 2009. The first season of the show was hosted by Mona Singh and Vishal Malhotra, and Farah Khan and Anu Malik were the judges.

== Concept ==
Entertainment Ke Liye aur bhi Kuch Bhi Karega was based on the popular American reality TV talent show 30 Seconds to Fame in which participants show off their unique talent and stand to win a cash prize. A participant must perform for one minute, without being voted out by the audience or judges, to win the cash prize of Rs. 11,111.

The judges and audience have the authority to vote out a participant, although the judges can use their veto to give a disqualified participant another chance. To cast their vote, they are provided an electronic disapproval voting system. If more than 60 percent of the audience or either of the judges cast a negative vote, a so-called "deadly hooter" sounds and the participant is eliminated. However, if the participant is not voted out within the one-minute period, he or she qualifies for the cash prize of Rs. 11,111.

At the end of every show, the judges pick two of the qualifiers to participate in the weekly finale episode on Friday, where they get to perform one more time and stand a chance to win a bigger prize of Rs. 500,000.

== Seasons ==
=== Season 1 ===
The show's first season aired from 25 May 2009 to 3 July 2009, after which it was replaced by another reality game show, Iss Jungle Se Mujhe Bachao. Bollywood actor Riteish Deshmukh was the special guest for the finale episode.

=== Season 2 ===
The season was named as Entertainment Ke Liye sub Kuch Karega

=== Season 3 ===
Season 3 started from 16 August 2010

==== Special Guests (Season 3) ====
- Mithun Chakraborty (Mon, 16 Aug.)
- Anil Kapoor (Fri, 20 Aug.)
- Rakhi Sawant (Fri., 27 Aug.)
- Salman Khan (Mon., 6 Sept.)
- Ranbir Kapoor and Priyanka Chopra (Mon., Sept.27)
- Akshay kumar (Sun., Oct.10) (Grand finale)
- [the season was hosted by Mona Singh and Vishal Malhotra.

=== Season 4 ===
Started from 6 June 2011. The winners of Season 4 are The Raibishi group from West Bengal.

==== Special Guests (Season 4) ====
- Salman Khan (Mon, 6 June)
- Sunil Shetty (Mon, 23 June)
- Sonu Sood ( Wed, 27 July)
- Double Dhamaal Arshad Warsi, Ritesh Deshmukh, Jaaved Jaffrey, Ashish Choudary
- Dayanand Shetty
- Sreesanth
- Anil Kapoor

=== Season 5 ===
Season 5 started from 12 May 2014. The auditions for this season began on 26 January 2014.Anu Malik and Farah Khan again are the judges and the show is hosted by Krushna Abhishek and Mona Singh.
