= Sudesh Lehri =

Indian comedian and actor (born 1968)

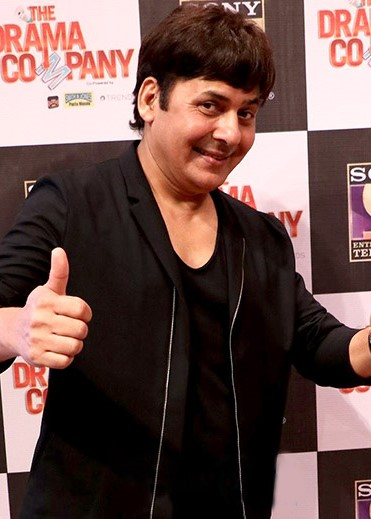
- Lehri in 2017
- Born: 27 October 1968 (age 57); Jalandhar, Punjab, India
- Occupations: Stand-up comedian, actor, singer
- Years active: 2004–present
- Spouse: Mamta Lehri
- Children: 2
- Notable work: The Great Indian Laughter Challenge (season 3); Comedy Circus; Comedy Nights Bachao

Comedy career
- Medium: Stand-up, television, film
- Genres: musical comedy; physical comedy; character comedy
- Subjects: Bollywood; Punjab

Sudesh Lehri (born 27 October 1968) is an Indian stand-up comedian, singer, and actor who works in Hindi and Punjabi television and films.

== Early life and background ==
Lehri was born on 27 October 1968 in Jalandhar, Punjab, India. Raised in a low-income family, he did not attend formal school and worked from childhood at tea stalls, sweet shops, and factories, as well as selling kulfi and vegetables.

He began his entertainment career performing as a singer and mimicry artist with local wedding orchestras in Punjab, imitating popular singers and event announcers. He subsequently recorded Punjabi comedy audio and video albums and performed in regional stage shows and Punjabi films, making his screen debut in Ghuggi Chhoo Mantar (2004).

== Career ==
=== Breakthrough with The Great Indian Laughter Challenge ===
In 2007, Lehri participated in the third season of the stand-up comedy reality competition The Great Indian Laughter Challenge on Star One. He finished as the second runner-up behind Kapil Sharma and Chandan Prabhakar, which led to wider recognition in Hindi television.

=== Television success ===
Following his appearance on The Great Indian Laughter Challenge, Lehri became a regular performer in Indian television sketch comedy shows.

==== Comedy Circus (2008–2014) ====
Lehri joined Comedy Circus in 2008 and competed across multiple seasons. Paired with fellow comedian Krushna Abhishek, the duo performed parodies of Bollywood films and character-driven sketches, winning three seasons together.

==== Comedy Classes (2014–2016) ====
In October 2014, Lehri joined the Life OK sitcom and sketch show Comedy Classes, portraying comedic characters inside a fictional acting school alongside Krushna Abhishek, Bharti Singh, and Shakeel Siddiqui.

==== Comedy Nights Bachao (2015–2017) ====
From 2015 to 2017, Lehri co-hosted and performed on Comedy Nights Bachao on Colors TV, a comedy series featuring roast-style humour directed at celebrity guests.

==== The Kapil Sharma Show ====
In 2021, Lehri joined the cast of The Kapil Sharma Show on Sony Entertainment Television, performing in recurring sketch roles alongside Kapil Sharma and Krushna Abhishek.

=== Laughter Chefs ===
From 2024 to 2025, Lehri appeared as a contestant on the cooking-comedy television series Laughter Chefs – Unlimited Entertainment. In August 2025, he also participated in the reality series Pati Patni Aur Panga – Jodiyon Ka Reality Check with his wife Mamta Lehri.

=== Film career ===
Lehri has acted in supporting comic roles in Hindi films including Naughty @ 40 (2011), Ready (2011), Jai Ho (2014), Great Grand Masti (2016), and Total Dhamaal (2019), as well as Punjabi-language films including Wagah (2007), Hashar (2008), Tara Mira (2019), and Ardab Mutiyaran (2019).

=== Collaborations with Krushna Abhishek ===
Lehri has frequently collaborated with comedian Krushna Abhishek as a comedy duo across several television series:

- Comedy Circus (2008–2014)
- Comedy Classes (2014–2016)
- Comedy Nights Bachao (2015–2017)
- Comedy Nights Live (2016)
- The Drama Company (2017–2018)

== Personal life ==
Lehri is married to Mamta Lehri, and the couple has two children.

== Filmography ==
He has appeared in several Punjabi and Hindi films.

Year	Film	Role	Language	Notes
2004	Ghuggi Chhoo Mantar		Punjabi	
2007	Wagah		Punjabi	
2008	Hashar		Punjabi	
2009	Akhiyaan Udeekdian		Punjabi	
2010	Bhavnao Ko Samjho		Hindi	
2010	Muskurake Dekh Zara		Hindi	
2010	Panjaban		Punjabi	
2010	Simran		Punjabi	
2011	Welcome to Punjab		Punjabi	
2011	Naughty @ 40		Hindi	
2011	Ready	Lehri	Hindi	
2013	Dil Sada Luteya Gaya		Punjabi	
2014	Jai Ho	Pandit	Hindi	
2016	Great Grand Masti	Ramse	Hindi	
2017	Munna Michael	Inspector Shinde	Hindi	
2019	Total Dhamaal	Altaaf	Hindi	
2019	Tara Mira		Punjabi	
2019	Ardab Mutiyaran	Bittu Bansal	Punjabi	
2022	Nikamma	Suresh Trivedi	Hindi	
2023	Dream Girl 2	Baby Baba	Hindi	
2025	Badass Ravi Kumar	Rocky	Hindi	
2025	Baaghi 4	Pali Pehelwan	Hindi	
2025	Jassi Weds Jassi	Mammaji	Hindi	

== Television shows ==
Television series

Year	Show	Role(s)	Notes
2007	The Great Indian Laughter Challenge III	Himself	2nd Runner-up
2007	Dekh India Dekh	Himself	
2008–2014	Comedy Circus	Himself	
2014–2015	Comedy Classes	Various characters	
2015–2017	Comedy Nights Bachao	Host and various characters	
2016	Comedy Nights Live	Various characters	
2017–2018	The Drama Company	Various characters	
2021	The Kapil Sharma Show	Various characters	
2024–2025	Laughter Chefs – Unlimited Entertainment	Contestant	
2025	Pati Patni Aur Panga – Jodiyon Ka Reality Check	Contestant	7th place
