= Adaa Khan =

Indian television actress (born 1989)

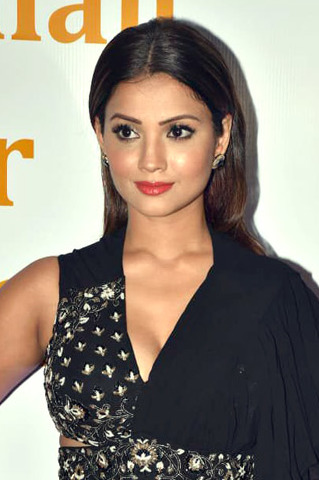
- Khan in 2020
- Born: 12 May 1989 (age 37); Bombay, Maharashtra, India
- Occupations: Actress; model
- Years active: 2009—present
- Known for: Behenein; Amrit Manthan; Naagin; Fear Factor: Khatron Ke Khiladi 10

Adaa Khan (born 12 May 1989) is an Indian television actress and model. She is known for portraying Akashi in Behenein, Amrit in Amrit Manthan and Shesha in Naagin. In 2020, she participated in Fear Factor: Khatron Ke Khiladi 10.

== Early and personal life ==
Khan was born in Bombay (now Mumbai), Maharashtra on 12 May 1989. Her mother Parvin Khan died from cancer in March 2013. She has a brother named Imran Khan.

Khan was in a long relationship with actor Ankit Gera during mid-2010s. They ultimately broke up due to infidelity on his part.

== Career ==
Khan started out her career as a model and appeared in several advertisements. Following her stint in modelling and advertisements, Khan decided to opt for a career as an actor in television. In 2009, she debuted in Hindi television by playing the role of Vigya in the Sony Entertainment Television show Palampur Express.

In 2010, she appeared in Star Plus's show Behenein. It centres around the story of four rich sisters. She was cast in the role of Aakashi Shastri, one of the lead roles.

In 2012, Khan played a leading role in the Director's Kut Productions drama Amrit Manthan as Princess Amrit Kaur Sodhi, co-starring Ankita Sharma, Dimple Jhangiani and Navi Bhangu.

She did episodic roles in shows like Yeh Hai Aashiqui, Crime Patrol, Code Red and Savdhaan India @ 11. She was also a contestant on the reality show Welcome – Baazi Mehmaan Nawazi Ki.

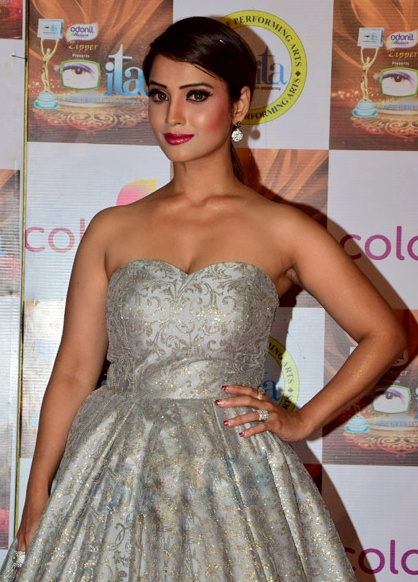
Khan at the Indian Television Academy Awards in 2017

In 2015, Khan's breakthrough came when she played the role of Shesha, a shape-shifting serpent in Naagin. In 2016, she reprised her role of Shesha in Naagin 2. In 2018, she played the lead role of Sitara in the supernatural series Vish Ya Amrit: Sitara.

In 2019, she made a guest appearance in Naagin 3, reprising her role of Shesha.

In 2020, she participated in Fear Factor: Khatron Ke Khiladi 10. The same year, she made another appearance as Shesha again as a guest in Naagin 5. In 2022, she returned to play the role of Shesha in Naagin: Basant Panchami Special. In 2023, she played the role of Shesha once again in Naagin 6.

== Media image ==
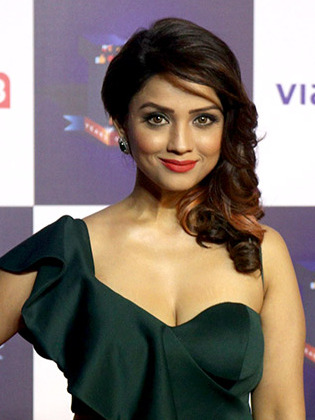
Khan in 2018

In 2018, Khan was placed tenth in The Times of India's Most Desirable Women on Television list. Khan is a celebrity endorser for brands such as Vivel and Tide. She is also widely known for her style and fashion sense.

== Filmography ==
=== Television ===
| Year | Title | Role | Notes | Ref. |
|---|---|---|---|---|
| 2009 | Palampur Express | Vigya | | |
| 2010–2011 | Behenein | Aakashi Shastri | | |
| 2012–2013 | Amrit Manthan | Princess Amrit Kaur Sodhi / Rajjo | Dual role | |
| 2013 | Yeh Hai Aashiqui | Subbalaxmi | Episodic roles | |
| 2013 | Savdhaan India | Pooja Saxena / Sneha Mulle / Malti Anmol Shah | Episodic roles | |
| 2013 | Crime Patrol Dastak | Nusrat Kazmi | Episodic roles | |
| 2013 | Fear Files | Sofia | Episodic roles | |
| 2014 | Welcome 2 – Baazi Mehmaan Nawazi Ki | Contestant | | |
| 2014 | Encounter | Sonali | Episodic role | |
| 2014 | Piya Basanti Re | Piya Patel | | |
| 2014–2015 | Box Cricket League 1 | Contestant | | |
| 2015 | Code Red | Zarina / Aafreen Murtaza | Episodic role | |
| 2015 | The Great Indian Family Drama | Host | | |
| 2015 | Rishton Ka Mela | Shruti | | |
| 2015–2017 | Comedy Nights Bachao | Contestant | | |
| 2015–2016 | Naagin | Shesha/ Visarpi | | |
| 2016–2017 | Naagin 2 | Shesha / Ruchika | | |
| 2018–2019 | Kanpur Wale Khuranas | Mrs. Pramod Kumar | | |
| 2018–2019 | Vish Ya Amrit: Sitara | Sitara Shekhawat / Sitara Viraj Singh / Vishtara | | |
| 2020 | Fear Factor: Khatron Ke Khiladi 10 | Contestant | 7th place | |
| 2023 | Naagin 6 | Shesha / Sasha Suri | | |
| 2023 | Wagle Ki Duniya – Nayi Peedhi Naye Kissey | Sakhi Warge | Cameo | |
| 2026 | Apsara | Nirritti | Cameo | |

==== Special appearances ====
| Year | Title | Role | Ref. |
|---|---|---|---|
| 2011 | Chand Chupa Badal Mein | Akashi | |
| 2012 | Junoon – Aisi Nafrat Toh Kaisa Ishq | Amrit | |
| 2013 | Kaisa Yeh Ishq Hai... Ajab Sa Risk Hai | Amrit | |
| 2014 | Ek Rishta Aisa Bhi | Pia | |
| 2015 | Yeh Dil Sun Raha Hai | Pia | |
| 2015 | Meri Aashiqui Tum Se Hi | Shesha | |
| 2015 | Balika Vadhu | Shesha | |
| 2015 | Jhalak Dikhhla Jaa 8 | Herself | |
| 2015 | Bigg Boss 9 | Herself | |
| 2016 | Yeh Vaada Raha | Herself | |
| 2016 | Box Cricket League 2 | Herself | |
| 2016 | Comedy Nights Live | Herself | |
| 2016 | Comedy Classes | Herself | |
| 2016 | Bigg Boss 10 | Herself | |
| 2017 | Waaris | Herself | |
| 2017 | Pardes Mein Hai Mera Dil | Ahana | |
| 2018 | Yeh Rishta Kya Kehlata Hai | Herself | |
| 2018 | India's Next Superstars | Herself | |
| 2019 | Naagin 3 | Shesha | |
| 2019 | Bigg Boss 13 | Herself | |
| 2019 | Kitchen Champion 5 | Herself | |
| 2020 | Naagin 5 | Shesha | |
| 2022 | Bigg Boss 15 | Herself | |
| 2022 | Naagin : Basant Panchami Special | Shesha | |
| 2022 | Kumkum Bhagya | Tamanna | |

=== Web series ===
| Year | Title | Role | Ref. |
|---|---|---|---|
| 2022 | Shubh Mangal Mein Dangal | Mitali | |
| 2022 | Ratri Ke Yatri | Meera | |
| 2022 | Hasratein | Karuna | |
| 2024 | Ek Ladki Ko Dekha To | Anika Guleria/ Dr. Amrita | |
| 2025 | Yuva crime files | | |

=== Music videos ===
| Year | Title | Singer(s) | Ref. |
|---|---|---|---|
| 2021 | Kde Kde | Harvi | |
| 2021 | Mohabbat Phir Ho Jayegi | Yasser Desai | |
| 2021 | Jugni | Divya Kumar | |
| 2021 | Door Ho Gaya | Akhil Sachdeva | |
| 2022 | Aaram De | Ankit Tiwari | |
| 2022 | Tera Hoya Deewana | Deep Money | |
| 2022 | Baariish Ke Mausam | Deedar Kaur, Biswajit Ghosh | |
| 2022 | Ho Gaya Hai Tere Naal Pyar | Rajdeep Chatterjee | |

== Awards and nominations ==
| Year | Award | Category | Role | Show | Ref. |
|---|---|---|---|---|---|
| 2013 | Indian Telly Awards | Best Actress in a Negative Role (Jury) | Amrit | Amrit Manthan | |
| 2016 | Gold Awards | Best Actress in a Negative Role (Critics) | Shesha | Naagin | |
| 2017 | Gold Awards | Best Actress in a Negative Role (Critics) | Shesha | Naagin | |
| 2020 | Indian Television Academy Awards | Landmark Performance | Shesha | Naagin | |

== See also ==
- List of Hindi television actresses
- List of Indian television actresses
