= Fuge (surname) =

Fuge is a surname. Notable people with the surname include:

- Katharine Fuge, English soprano
- Prathamesh Fuge (born 2002), Indian compound archer
