= Mubeen Saudagar =

Indian stand-up comedian

- Occupations: Actor, Stand-up comedian
- Known for: Comedy Nights Bachao; Comedy Classes; Comedy Circus; Honey Bunny Ka Jholmaal; Oggy and the Cockroaches

Mubeen Saudagar is an Indian stand-up comedian and mimicry artist.

== Career and personal life ==
Saudagar started his career by performing at various social and cultural events. On the sets of Johnny Aala Re, he met comedian and actor Johnny Lever. Lever asked him to go for an audition. He then got selected and performed in Johnny Aala Re. Saudagar's comedy shows include Laughter Ke Phatke, Comedy Champions, Pehchan Kaun, Yeh Chanda Kanoon Hai, Comedy Circus, Comedy Classes and Comedy Nights Bachao. In 2017 he was dubbed for Sony Yay's series Honey Bunny Ka Jholmaal, he was dubbed for Honey, Bunny, Zordaar, Popat and some additional characters in this series. and in 2021 he joined Zee TV's Zee Comedy Show. He also has commentated and give voices to all characters in Oggy and the Cockroaches for Sony YAY! in Hindi.

== Television ==
Year	Title	Role	Ref(s)
2007	Johny Aala Re	Stage Performer	

== Filmography ==
Year	Title	Role	Ref(s)
2024	Vicky Vidya Ka Woh Wala Video	Sunil	
