= Comedy Classes =

Indian comedy television series

- Genre: Sketch comedy
- Created by: Vipul D. Shah
- Written by: Gaurav Dubey; Dinesh Brigedier; Anand
- Directed by: Nikul C. Desai
- Starring: Bharti Singh; Krushna Abhishek; Sudesh Lehri; Shakeel Siddiqui; Siddharth Sagar
- Country of origin: India
- Original language: Hindi
- No. of seasons: 4

Production
- Producers: Vipul D. Shah; Sanjiv Sharma
- Editor: Ved Satpathy
- Camera setup: Multi-camera
- Running time: 25 minutes
- Production company: Optimystix Entertainment

Original release
- Network: Life OK
- Release: 7 October 2014 – 8 May 2016

Comedy Classes is an Indian comedy show on channel Life OK. Produced by Optimystix Entertainment, its starting date was 7 October 2014. The show is set in the Ache Din Institute, an acting school run by Selfie Mausi and her brother Naseer.

== Overview ==
Initially a sitcom, the show converted into a spoofs-based show. It starred Krushna Abhishek, Sudesh Lehri, Bharti Singh, Madhura Naik, Shakeel Siddiqui, Mubeen Saudagar, Siddharth Sagar, Subuhi Joshi, Bruna Abdullah, and Shraman Jain in the first season.

The second season started on 12 May 2015. Siddharth Sagar as 'Selfie Mausi' hosted skits performed by various comedians. The cast included Krushna Abhishek, Bharti Singh, Siddharth Sagar, Mubeen Saudagar, Shakeel Siddiqui, Bruna Abdullah, and Subuhi Joshi.

The third season Comedy Classes added Archana Puran Singh as judge named 'Maafia Mausi'. Show was made more interactive with live audience. The cast members were Siddharth Sagar, Mubeen Saudagar, Siddharth Jadhav, Sugandha Mishra, Rauf Lala, Shakeel Siddiqui, Subuhi Joshi, Sayantani Ghosh, Arti Singh, Purbi Joshi, and Balraj.

In the fourth season, the show was made biweekly. The show format was changed into making spoofs of Bollywood blockbuster movies enacted by its Cast Siddharth Sagar, Mubeen Saudagar, Gaurav Khanna, Siddharth Jadhav, Purbi Joshi, Balraj and Arti Singh, and Shakeel Siddiqui.

The fifth season Comedy Classes Evolution. The cast members were Siddharth Sagar, Mubeen Saudagar, Siddharth Jadhav, Sugandha Mishra, Sanket Bhosale, Sudesh Lehri, Devoleena Bhattacharjee, Sunil Grover, Upasana Singh, Shakeel Siddiqui, Ali Asgar, Sumona Chakravarti, Kapil Sharma and Balraj.

== Special appearance ==
- Saif Ali Khan and Ileana D'Cruz to promote their film Happy Ending
- Adil Hussain and Mona Singh to promote their film Zed Plus
- Rakhi Sawant - Guest appearance (2015, 2016)
- Ganesh Acharya to promote his film Hey Bro
- Rahul Mahajan and Dimpy Mahajan (2015) - Bigg Boss contestants (spoof)
- Geeta Kapoor (2015) - Guest appearance in (spoof of Jhalak Dikhhla Jaa)
- Devoleena Bhattacharjee as Gopi Bahu (spoof of Saath Nibhaana Saathiya
- Sara Khan (2015) - Guest appearance as Sadhna Bahu (Spoof of Sapna Babul Ka...Bidaai) and Dance Performance on Republic Day (2016)
- Vishal Singh As Nawab and Guest appearance in New Year Special (2015)
- Sidharth Shukla, Savio Barnes, Sayantani Ghosh, Aishwarya Sakhuja (2015) - Guest appearance as contestant in Dance Baliye! (Spoof of Nach Baliye)
- Emraan Hashmi and Amyra Dastur to promote their film Mr. X (2015)
- Apara Mehta - (2015) Guest appearance as Judge of Miss Mohalla.
- Pratyusha Banerjee, Tina Dutta, Usha Nadkarni (spoof of Balika Vadhu, Pavitra Rishta and Uttaran
- Kunal Kapur (2015) - Guest appearance as Judge of Master Chef
- Jackky Bhagnani and Lauren Gottlieb to promote the film Welcome to Karachi
- Rajeev Mehta (2015) - Guest appearance as Praful Parekh (Spoof of Kichidi)
- Puja Banerjee (2015) - Guest appearance
- Deepika Singh - Guest appearance
- Krystle D'Souza - Guest appearance
- Hina Khan (2015) (spoof of Yeh Rishta Kya Kehlata Hai)
- Kirthi Shetty (2015) - Guest appearance
- Sonali Raut (2015) - Guest appearance
- Ajaz Khan (2015) - Guest appearance
- Upasana Singh (2015) - Guest appearance
- Malishka RJ (2015) - Guest appearance
- Sunny Deol (2015) - Guest appearance to promote his film Ghayal Once Again
- Tushar Kapoor and Aftab Shivdasani (2015) - Guest appearance to promote their film Kya Kool Hai Hum 3
- Kartik Aaryan, Sunny Singh, Nushrat Bharucha, Omkar Kapoor, Sonali Sehgall, Ishita Raj Sharma (2015) - to promote their film Pyaar Ka Punchnama 2
- Yuvika Chaudhary (2015, 2016) - Guest appearance
- Kashmera Shah, Neha Kakkar - Guest appearance
- Anita Hassanandani (2015) - Guest appearance
- Adaa Khan, Karan Wahi, Mohammad Nazim, Rahul Vaidya, Jay Soni on Republic Day (2016)
- Nataliya kozhenova - Guest appearance
