= Shakeel Siddiqui =

Pakistani comedian

- Born: 26 May 1964 (age 62); Karachi, Sindh, Pakistan
- Other name: Teeli
- Occupations: Actor; Comedian; Director; Play writer
- Children: 7, including Sharahbil Siddiqui
- Notable work: Comedy Circus; Comedy Nights Bachao; Comedy Nights Live; Comedy Kings

Comedy career
- Medium: Stand-up; Television; Film
- Genres: Black comedy; Insult comedy; Satire
- Subjects: Everyday life; Pakistani culture; Popular culture

Shakeel Siddiqui (Urdu: شکیل صدیقی; born 26 May 1964) is a Pakistani television stand-up comedian, stage and film actor, theatre director and playwright.

Initially interested in singing, on the insistence of a cousin he began his career as a stage actor in the early 1980s, inspired by comedian Lehri and collaborating with the likes of Moin Akhter and especially Umer Shareef.

In the 2000s, he also rose to prominence in India after appearing as a contestant in Comedy Circus.

Shakeel Siddiqui also appeared as a celebrity guest in Salman Khan's reality game show, Dus Ka Dum (2008).

In Pakistan, Shakeel is also known as Teeli, after his character from the popular theatre play Bakra Qiston Pay.

== Career ==
=== Early career as stage actor ===
In his earlier career, Shakeel did not quite click until he was discovered by Umar Shareef, who eventually made him an important theater artist. Both worked together in several stage dramas, including Bakra Qiston Pay (Goat On Installments), Yeh To House Full Hogaya (Full House), Nayee Ammi Purana Abba (New Mother, Old Father), Dulhan Main Lekar Jaonga (I Will Take The Bride), Beauty Parlour, Budha Ghar Per Hai (The Old Man Is Home) and many more.

=== Theatre director and playwright ===
Outside acting, Shakeel had also directed and written plays, including Dunya Do Numberi, which was staged in Karachi's Arts Council of Pakistan in 2020.

=== Success in India and departure (2008–2016) ===
Due to the 26/11 attack in Mumbai, all the artists from Pakistan, including Shakeel, were asked to leave the country. Some news channels and blogs reported that Shakeel was beaten and forced to leave India by locals due to 26/11 Mumbai attacks.

However, he later denied being beaten or abused and claimed that the producers of Sony were threatened by the members of MNS of "dire consequences" if they continue to allow Pakistanis to perform on their shows. As a safety precaution, the producers and the artist agreed to have him leave the country. This claim coincides with later reports.

In early 2014, Shakeel made a comeback to Indian screen with Comedy Classes on Life Ok.

== Selected filmography ==
=== Stage dramas ===
Year	Title
1989	Bakra Qiston Pay
2003	Yeh To House Full Hogaya
2004	Nayee Ammi Purana Abba

=== Television dramas ===
Year	Title	Role	Channel
1994	Aitraaf	Jumman	PTV
2009–11	Yeh Kaisi Mohabbat Hai		Geo TV
2013	Ideals		TV One

=== Films ===
Year	Title	Role	Language
1995	Munda Bigra Jaye	Teeli	Urdu
1996	Baazigar		Punjabi
1998	Kabhi Haan Kabhi Naa	Hero Bhai	Urdu

=== Television reality shows ===
Year	Show	Role	Country	Notes
2008–09	Ustaadon Ka Ustaad	Contestant	India	Won
2008–09	Comedy Circus : Kaante Ki Takkar	Celebrity contestant with Urvashi Dholakia	India	
2010–11	Comedy Circus Ke SuperStars	Celebrity contestant with Urvashi Dholakia	India	
2013–14	Comedy Club	Celebrity contestant with Sucheta Khanna	India	
2014–15	Comedy Classes	Urdu teacher	India	
2015–16	Comedy Nights Bachao	Himself and various roles	India	
2016	Comedy Nights Live	Various roles	India	
