= Comedy Nights Live =

Indian comedy TV show

- Genre: comedy
- Written by: Dinesh Brigedier; Raj Verma, Haarsh Limbachiyaa, Kousten Sahu, Khalid Azmi
- Directed by: Nikul Desai
- Starring: See below
- Country of origin: India
- Original language: Hindi
- No. of seasons: 1
- No. of episodes: 26

Production
- Production locations: Mumbai, Maharashtra, India
- Camera setup: Multi-camera
- Running time: 65 minutes approx.
- Production company: Optimystix Entertainment

Original release
- Network: Colors TV
- Release: 31 January – 21 August 2016

Related
- Comedy Nights with Kapil; Comedy Nights Bachao

Comedy Nights Live is an Indian Hindi-language stand-up comedy - humour television series, which premiered on 31 January 2016, and was broadcast on Colors TV. The series aired on Sunday nights. The series replaced Colors TV's show Comedy Nights with Kapil.

Krushna Abhishek hosted this show. Siddharth Sagar, Sudesh Lehri, Bharti Singh, Rashami Desai are some of the comedians of the show. Madhuri Dixit was the first celebrity to appear on the show.

== Cast ==
=== Season 1 ===
- Krushna Abhishek as Pappu Singh/Pappi Singh/ Tulsi/various characters
- Bharti Singh as Chintu Sharma
- Sudesh Lehri as Banwari Lal (Pappu's dad)/various characters
- Siddharth Sagar as Mangala Mufatlal/various characters
- Gaurav Dubey as foreigner
- Raju Srivastav as various characters
- Shakeel Siddiqui as various characters
- Firoz Ahmed as Permanent guest
- Upasana Singh as Pinki Bua
- Usha Nadkarni as Dadi
- Surbhi Jyoti as Actress
- Adaa Khan as Itee
- Puja Banerjee

=== Season 2 ===
- Krushna Abhishek as Pappu Singh
- Bharti Singh as Chintu Sharma
- Sudesh Lehri as Banwari Lal (Pappu's dad)
- Kratika Sengar as Itee
- Divyanka Tripathi as Actress

== List of episodes ==
No.	Telecast date	Guest(s)	To promote	Ref.
1	31 January 2016	Madhuri Dixit Nene		
2	7 February 2016	Aditya Roy Kapur, Katrina Kaif, Abhishek Kapoor, Salman Khan	Fitoor	
3	14 February 2016	Sonam Kapoor, Mandana Karimi	Neerja	
4	21 February 2016	Sunny Deol, Bobby Deol, Dharmendra	Ghayal Once Again	
5	28 February 2016	Mouni Roy, Adaa Khan, Siddharth Nigam, Eisha Singh, Sana Amin Sheikh	Naagin, Chakravartin Ashoka Samrat, Ishq Ka Rang Safed, Krishnadasi	
6	6 March 2016	Neha Kakkar, Himesh Reshammiya, Sunidhi Chauhan, Farah Karimi	Teraa Surroor	
7	13 March 2016	Tejaswi Prakash, Namish Taneja, Diljit Dosanjh, Lauren Gottlieb, Navneet Kaur Dhillon, Monica Gill	Swaragini - Jodein Rishton Ke Sur, Ambarsariya	
8	20 March 2016	John Abraham, Thomas Sardorf, Navtej Singh Rehal, Ankit Tiwari, Baby Diya Chalwad	Rocky Handsome	
9	27 March 2016	Arjun Kapoor, Kareena Kapoor Khan	Ki & Ka	
10	3 April 2016	Toral Rasputra, Jigyasa Singh, Vidhi Pandya, Meera Deosthale	Balika Vadhu, Thapki Pyar Ki, Udaan	
11	17 April 2016	Shraddha Kapoor, Tiger Shroff	Baaghi	
12	24 April 2016	Sonakshi Sinha, Honey Singh, Gurbani Judge, Parul Gulati (integration episode with Comedy Nights Bachao)	IIFA, Zorawar	
13	1 May 2016	Sunny Leone, Tanuj Virwani, Jasmine Sandlas	One Night Stand	
14	8 May 2016	Tabu, Juhi Chawla		
15	15 May 2016	Emraan Hashmi, Nargis Fakhri, Mohammad Azharuddin, Kunaal Roy Kapur	Azhar	
16	22 May 2016	Monali Thakur, Radhika Apte, Meet Bros, Sana Khan, Ram Gopal Varma, Lisa Ray, Shweta Pandit, Khushboo Grewal	Phobia, Nalla Awards special	
17	29 May 2016	Monali Thakur, Radhika Apte, Meet Bros, Sana Khan, Ram Gopal Varma, Lisa Ray, Shweta Pandit, Khushboo Grewal		
18	12 June 2016	Kajal Agrawal, Randeep Hooda	Do Lafzon Ki Kahani	
19	19 June 2016	Preity Zinta		
20	26 June 2016	Sukhwinder Singh, Faaiz Anwar	Love Ke Funday	
21	3 July 2016	Salman Khan	Sultan	
22	10 July 2016	Salim, Suleman, Shaan, Saqib Saleem, Taapsee Pannu, Mona Singh		
23	17 July 2016	Mudassar Khan, Mukti Mohan, Mona Singh, Geeta Kapoor	Special Appearance, Kavach...Kaali Shaktiyon Se	
24	24 July 2016	Neha Dhupia, Mona Singh, Gaurav Gera, Neha Pabbi, Sikander Kher, Anil Kapoor	part 1: Special appearance, 24 season 2 part 2: Competition Krushna Abhishek Mangala(Sudesh Lehri) and Chintu (Bharti Singh) vs Chutki (Gaurav Gera), Neha Dhupia and Mona Singh	
25	14 August 2016	Mithali Raj, Shikhar Dhawan (Integration episode with Comedy Nights Bachao)		
26	21 August 2016	Jacqueline Fernandez, Tiger Shroff, Remo D'Souza	A Flying Jatt	
