= Swasth Bharat =

Indian healthcare programme

Pradhan Mantri Atmanirbhar Swasth Bharat Yojana (PMASBY) is a healthcare programme launched in 2021 by Ministry of Health and Family Welfare. The programme was announced during the 2021 Union budget of India, with ₹64,180 crore (US$8.66 billion) earmarked to improve the infrastructure of India's public health system by fiscal year 2025–26.

== See also ==
- National Health Mission
