= Krushna Abhishek =

Indian actor and comedian (born 1983)

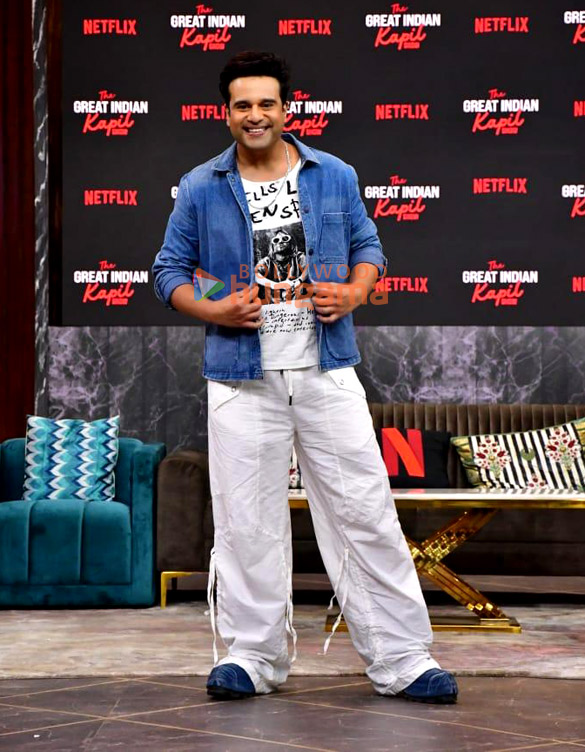
- Sharma in 2024
- Born: Abhishek Sharma; 30 May 1983 (age 43); Bombay, Maharashtra, India
- Occupations: Actor; comedian; television host
- Years active: 1996, 2002–present
- Spouse: Kashmera Shah (m. 2013)
- Children: 2
- Family: See Govinda family

Abhishek Sharma (born 30 May 1983), known professionally as Krushna Abhishek, is an Indian actor, comedian, and television host. He is known for his humorous work in comedy shows on Indian television such as Comedy Circus, Comedy Nights Bachao, The Kapil Sharma Show, The Great Indian Kapil Show and Laughter Chefs – Unlimited Entertainment. He gained fame as a comedian after participating in several seasons of the Comedy Circus show on Sony TV. He also appeared in dance reality shows, including Nach Baliye 3 (2007) and Jhalak Dikhhla Jaa 4 (2010). His dance moves are inspired by his maternal uncle Govinda.

He has hosted Entertainment Ke Liye Kuch Bhi Karega, OMG! Yeh Mera India, Comedy Nights Bachao, and Comedy Nights Live shows on Sony TV, History TV18, and Colors TV respectively.

== Early life ==
Abhishek Sharma was born on 30 May 1983 to Atma Prakash Sharma and Padma Sharma, in Bombay, Maharashtra, India. His ancestral roots are in Dhami, a village in Shimla district, Himachal Pradesh.

He has a sister Arti Singh, an actress. Govinda is his maternal uncle, they belong to the Govinda Family of Bollywood.

== Personal life ==
Krushna Abhishek married his long time girlfriend Kashmera Shah in 2013 and they live in Mumbai. They met at the sets of movie Aur Pappu Paas Ho Gaya.

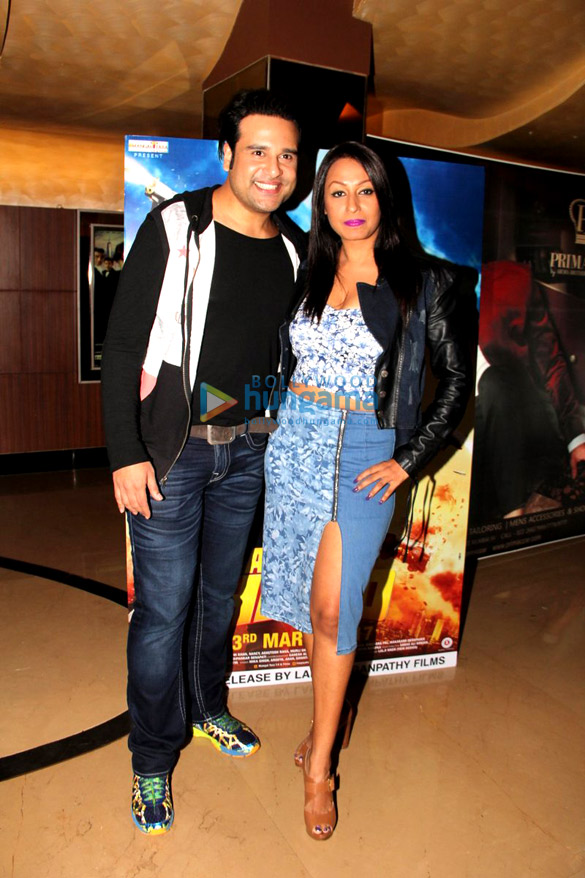
Abhishek with wife Kashmera Shah at the trailer launch of Aa Gaya Hero in 2017

== Career ==
He made his Hindi film debut with Yeh Kaisi Mohabbat (2002), and has acted in films like Hum Tum Aur Mother in 2005, Jahan Jaaeyega Hamen Paaeyega (2007), and Aur Pappu Pass Ho Gaya in the same year. Later he shifted to Bhojpuri films. He played the lead in the TV series, Sautela (Doordarshan) in 2007.

He participated in various seasons of stand-up comedy show, Comedy Circus, including, Comedy Circus 2 (2008), Comedy Circus 3 (2009), where he was a wild card entry in Comedy Circus 3 (2009) with Sudesh Lehri.

He participated in the celebrity couple dance-reality shows, starting with Nach Baliye (Season 3) (2007), and Kabhi Kabhii Pyaar Kabhi Kabhii Yaar (2008) along with Kashmera Shah and eventually won the latter. He also appeared in a similar show, Jalwa Four 2 Ka 1 (2008). In 2010, he participated in the dance reality show, Jhalak Dikhhla Jaa (Season 4) with choreographer Robin Merchant. Previously he had also appeared as a judge in the reality dance show on DD National, Krazzy Kiya Re, along with Sudha Chandran.

As a celebrity couple, he and Kashmera Shah took part in the reality show Love Lock Up on UTV Bindass in February 2011, in which actress Priyanka Chopra played the role of peace maker.

In 2016, he hosted and performed in Comedy Nights Live show of Colors TV, produced by Vipul D. Shah. It replaced popularity declined Comedy Nights with Kapil (2013–16) of Kapil Sharma. Later when the show itself got replaced Comedy Nights Bachao (2015–17) he hosted it and did comedy.

In July 2017, he signed with Sony TV's The Drama Company show produced by Kapil Sharma's former longtime girlfriend Preeti Simoes and her sister Neeti Simoes.

In 2018, he joined the second season of The Kapil Sharma Show along with Sudesh Lehri, whom he collaborated with in Comedy Circus as well, after the first season closed down due to Kapil Sharma's poor health and mid-air altercations with supporting actors.

In 2020, he starred in his new show Funhit Mein Jaari with Bharti Singh and others.

In 2022, he launched the latest season of his History TV18's Infotainment show 'OMG! Ye Mera India' (transl. OMG! This is my India). Till 2021, he has hosted 7 season of this show.

In 2024, he and Kashmera Shah took part in a reality show called Laughter Chefs on Colours TV hosted by Bharti Singh.

== Filmography ==
=== Television ===
Year	Show	Role(s)
1996	Just Mohabbat	Vishal
2007	Nach Baliye 3	Contestant
2007	Sautela	Yogank
2008	Kabhi Kabhii Pyaar Kabhi Kabhii Yaar	Contestant
2008–2014	Comedy Circus	Various Characters
2008	Jalwa Four 2 Ka 1	Contestant
2008	Krazzy Kiya Re	Judge
2010	Comedy Ka Daily Soap	Host
2010	Jhalak Dikhhla Jaa 4	Contestant
2011	Love Lock Up	Guest
2013	Nadaniyaan	Narrator
2014	Gangs of Haseepur	Contestant
2014	Mad in India	Host
2014	MAX Fully Deewana Contest	Various characters
2014	Entertainment Ke Liye Kuch Bhi Karega	Host
2014	Badi Door Se Aaye Hain	Jugnu
2014–15	Comedy Classes	Various characters
2015	Killerr Karaoke Atka Toh Latkah	Host
2015–2017	Comedy Nights Bachao	Various characters
2016	Comedy Nights Live	Pappu Singh
2016–present	OMG! Yeh Hai Mera India	Host
2017	India Banega Manch	Host
2017	Bittu Bak Bak	Teacher/Miss Rosy
2017–2018	The Drama Company	Various characters
2018–2023	The Kapil Sharma Show	Various characters
2019	Bigg Boss 13	Guest
2020–2021	Funhit Mein Jaari	Various characters
2024–present	The Great Indian Kapil Show	Various characters
2024–2026	Laughter Chefs – Unlimited Entertainment (Season 1–3)	Contestant

=== Films ===
Key
†	Denotes films that have not yet been released

Year	Title	Role	Language
2002	Enge Enadhu Kavithai	Krishna	Tamil
2002	Yeh Kaisi Mohabbat	Vicky	Hindi
2002	Tohar Pyar Chahi	Abhay	Bhojpuri
2002	Poojiha Charan Maai Baap Ke	Krishna	Bhojpuri
2002	Sathi Sanghatee	Gopi	Bhojpuri
2002	Devar Ji	Kishan	Bhojpuri
2002	Kahan Jaiba Najaria Churai Ke		Bhojpuri
2002	Kahe Bansuriya Bajaye		Bhojpuri
2006	Suhaag	Inspector Shankar Sinha	Bhojpuri
2007	Hamaar Izzat	Krishna	Bhojpuri
2007	London Wali Se Neha Lagai Bo		Bhojpuri
2007	Mumbai Che Pahune		Marathi
2007	Jahan Jaaeyega Hamen Paaeyega	Tony	Hindi
2007	Aur Pappu Paas Ho Gaya	Pappu / Prince of Trikamgarh	Hindi
2007	Sajnwa Anadi Sajania Khiladi	Raju	Bhojpuri
2007	Pyaar Ke Rang Hazaar	Rahul	Hindi
2007	Ayi Ayi Yaa Karoon Main Kya		Hindi
2008	Naag Naagin	Vaibhav	Bhojpuri
2008	De Da Piritiya Udhaar	Munna Bhaiya	Bhojpuri
2008	Seeta	Bhola	Chhattisgarhi
2008	Gawanwa Le Ja Raja Ji	Shiv	Bhojpuri
2008	Rang Barse Ganga Kinaar	Suraj	Bhojpuri
2008	8 PM: A Murder Mystery	Inspector Raja	Hindi
2009	Hamar Rajau Daroga No. 1	Raju	Bhojpuri
2012	Bol Bachchan	Ravi Shastri	Hindi
2014	Entertainment	Jugnu	Hindi
2015	2 Chehare	Monty Bhandari/Babu	Hindi
2016	Kyaa Kool Hain Hum 3	Mickey	Hindi
2018	Teri Bhabhi Hai Pagle	Raaj Chopra	Hindi
2019	Sharmaji Ki Lag Gai	Murli	Hindi
2019	Time Nahi Hai	Magan	Hindi
2019	Marne Bhi Do Yaaron	Samay / Time	Hindi
2020	O Pushpa I Hate Tears	Shyam	Hindi
2026	Welcome to the Jungle	Rambo	Hindi

=== Dubbing roles ===
Film title	Actor	Character	Dub language	Original language	Original year release	Dub year release	Notes
F3: Fun and Frustration	Varun Tej	Varun Yadav	Hindi	Telugu	2022	2023	
Chandramukhi 2	Raghava Lawrence	Pandian Sengottaiyan alias Vettaiyan	Hindi	Tamil	2023	2023	
Leo	Vijay	Leo Das / Parthiban (Parthi)	Hindi	Tamil	2023	2023	
Mark Antony	S. J. Suryah	Jackie Pandian and Madhan Pandian	Hindustani	Tamil	2023	2025	

== Awards and nominations ==
Year	Award	Category	Show/Movie	Result
2013	Times Of India Film Awards	Best Actor in a Supporting Role (Male)	Bol Bachchan	Nominated
2013	Apsara Producers Guild Film Awards	Best Actor in a Comic Role	Bol Bachchan	Nominated
2014	Indian Telly Awards	Best Actor in a Comic Role	Comedy Circus	Won
2015	Indian Television Academy Awards	Popular Comedy-Duo	Comedy Circus (with Sudesh Lehri)	Won
2015	BIG Star Entertainment Awards	Most Entertaining Jury/Host (TV)-Non Fiction	Comedy Nights Bachao (with Bharti Singh)	Won
2019	Indian Television Academy Awards	Best Actor - Comedy	The Kapil Sharma Show	Won
2020	Indian Television Academy Awards	Best Actor in a Supporting Role	The Kapil Sharma Show	Won
2021	Indian Television Academy Awards	Best Actor in a Supporting Role	The Kapil Sharma Show	Won
2023	Indian Telly Awards	Best Anchor	OMG! Yeh Mera India	Nominated
2024	Indian Television Academy Awards	Best Actor - Popular (OTT)	The Great Indian Kapil Show	Nominated
2024	Lions Gold Awards	Evergreen Jodi	Laughter Chefs – Unlimited Entertainment (with Kashmera Shah)	Won
2025	Indian Telly Awards	Best Comedian	Laughter Chefs – Unlimited Entertainment	Won
2025	Indian Telly Awards	Fan Favorite Jodi – Non fiction	Laughter Chefs – Unlimited Entertainment (with Kashmera Shah)	Won
2025	Indian Television Academy Awards	Best Supporting Actor OTT (Comedy series)	The Great Indian Kapil Show	Nominated
2025	Indian Television Academy Awards	Best Actor Reality (Comedy – Non fiction)	Laughter Chefs – Unlimited Entertainment (Season 2)	Won
