= Comedy Circus =

Indian sitcom series

- Logo
- Created by: Optimystix Entertainment
- Written by: Hilal Ahmed; Raj Verma; Amberdeep Singh; Naresh Kathuria; Rajiv Nigam; Manoj Sabharwaal; Raaj Shaandilyaa; Haarsh Limbachiyaa; Vankush Dinesh Brigedier Arora; Devraj Chandra; Khalid Azmi; Mahesh Bhalla; Shobhit Sinha; Kousten; Rishabh Tiwari; Prajwal Gupta
- Directed by: Nikul Desai
- Country of origin: India
- Original language: Hindi
- No. of seasons: 18

Production
- Editor: Ved Satpathy
- Running time: 90 minutes

Original release
- Network: Sony Entertainment Television
- Release: 16 June 2007 – 15 September 2018

Comedy Circus is an Indian comedy show that aired on Sony Entertainment Television, where daily soap stars perform stand-up comedy. Paired with the "finest" stand-up comedy talent from India, these soap stars perform stand-up comedy along with their comedian partners on stage.

== Overview ==
=== Comedy Circus ===
The show went live for 13 weeks in a gruelling battle for supremacy to decide which pair will be the best stand-up comic. The show was created by the Optimystix Entertainment, with the tag line of 'Jodi Jamegi, Public Hassegi', which was described to "guarantee hysterics" on Sony TV.

=== Comedy Circus 2 ===
The second season started airing on Sony TV on 26 April 2008. Popular television actors and professional stand-up comedians were paired to perform on a highly competitive stage. Their weekly performances were scored by the judges and the live studio audience to determine eliminations.

=== Comedy Circus: Kaante Ki Takkar ===
After Comedy Circus 1 & 2, "Comedy Circus: Kaante Ki Takkar" was introduced as the third season, which had the 'jodis' of Comedy Circus 1 led by judge Archana Puran Singh, battling the jodis of Comedy Circus 2, led by judge Shekhar Suman. The teams of Archana Puran Singh were called as 'The Purans' while the teams of Shekhar Suman were called as 'The Sumans'.

Shruti Seth, who hosted the previous season, was replaced by Purbi Joshi.

=== Comedy Circus: Chinchpokli to China ===
Another popular reality-based comedy TV Show from Sony Entertainment Television, which was the fourth season of the Comedy Circus franchise comes with the tagline "Comedy Circus: Chinchpokli to China – Jaha se koi Bhi Hanse Bina jayena". It is a comedy-based show like the previous Comedy Circus seasons with a slight twist in the plot. This season featured comedians in pairs to perform skits and impress the judges and get scored by them. It was hosted by Purbi Joshi and Nandini Kapoor.

=== Comedy Circus 20-20 ===
This season was described as the season "with gags, jokes, laughter, hilarious acts, etc. adding the flavor of IPL season". The stand-up performances were based on the happenings in IPL how cricket affects our daily lives and everything related to the game. The show was hosted by Shruti Seth, and the judges are Shekhar Suman and cricketer Ajay Jadeja.

=== Dekh India Dekh ===
The sixth season of the popular stand-up comedy series of Comedy Circus which aired on SonyTV, premiered on 30 May 2009 and ended on 30 October 2009. Shekar Suman made his return as the judge alongside Archana Puran Singh. This new format saw Shweta Gulati as the host.

=== Comedy Circus: 3 Ka Tadka ===
The show featured celebrities performing with professional stand-up comedians. In this season, the format was changed from jodis (pairs) to trios, with a third celebrity joining each team. The season premiered on 24 October 2009 Mouni Roy initially hosted the show and was later replaced by Roshni Chopra.

=== Comedy Circus Ke Superstars ===
This season premiered on 24 October 2009. The first episode also starred Govinda who introduced new artists and was guest judge.

=== Comedy Circus: Mahasangram ===
This season involved contestants of three previous seasons. Archana represented season 1, Shekhar represented season 2 and Rohit Shetty represented season 3. Teams were scored by the opposite team representatives, with the audience watching the show to determine eliminations. The winners of this show were Swapnil Joshi and VIP.

=== Comedy Circus 2018 ===
This was a comeback for the comedy circus franchise. Aired initially on 15 September 2018, this season had new talent, new styles of comedy and new ways of scoring. The scoring would depend upon the laughter of the judges, like if they would experience 'Mand Mand' laughter, the team would get Rs. 2500, for every 'Hahakar' laughter team gets Rs. 5000, and for every 'phephda phad' laughter they would get Rs. 10,000.

== Season summary ==
Year	Season	Host	Judges	Winners
2007	Comedy Circus	Shruti Seth	Archana Puran Singh; Johnny Lever; Satish Shah	Kashif Khan; Ali Asgar
2008	Comedy Circus 2	Shruti Seth and Shakeel Siddiqui	Archana Puran Singh; Satish Shah; Shekhar Suman	Juhi Parmar; V.I.P.
2008	Comedy Circus: Kaante Ki Takkar	Purbi Joshi replaced Shruti Seth	Archana Puran Singh; Shekhar Suman	Urvashi & Ali Asgar; Sudesh & Rajiv Thakur
2009	Comedy Circus: Chinchpokli To China	Purbi Joshi	Archana Puran Singh; Shekhar Suman	Krushna Abhishek; Ali Asgar
2009	Comedy Circus 20-20	Shruti Seth	Archana Puran Singh (Only on finale episode); Ajay Jadeja; Shekhar Suman	Raja Sagoo; Nigaar Khan
2009	Dekh India Dekh	Jennifer Winget replacing Shweta Gulati	Archana Puran Singh; Shekhar Suman	Krishna Abhishek; Sudesh Lehri
2009	Comedy Circus: 3 Ka Tadka	Mouni Roy replaced by Roshni Chopra	Archana Puran Singh; Shekhar Suman; Rohit Shetty	Krishna Abhishek; Sudesh Lehri; Melissa Pais
2010	Comedy Circus: Mahasangram	Purbi Joshi	Archana Puran Singh; Shekhar Suman; Rohit Shetty	Swapnil Joshi; V.I.P.
2010	Comedy Circus Ke Superstars	Surveen Chawla; Rashmi Desai (for 2 episodes)	Archana Puran Singh; Rohit Shetty	Kapil Sharma; Parvati Sehgal
2010	Comedy Circus Ka Jadoo	Anita Hassanandani; Surveen Chawla & Shruti Seth (Grand Finale)	Archana Puran Singh; Shekhar Suman	Kapil Sharma; Mukti Mohan
2010–2011	Jubilee Comedy Circus	Pooja Kanwal; Mantra; Shruti Seth & Ali Asgar (Grand Finale)	Archana Puran Singh; Rohit Shetty	Kapil Sharma; Shikha Singh; and: Rajiv Nigam; Krushna Abhishek
2011	Comedy Circus Ke Tansen	Saumya Tandon; Neha Dhupia (Grand Finale)	Archana Puran Singh; Daler Mehndi	Kapil Sharma; Ali Asgar
2011	Comedy Circus Ka Naya Daur	Roshni Chopra; Reshmi Ghosh (Episode 1); Shweta Tiwari (Episode 2–4)	Archana Puran Singh; Sohail Khan	Kapil Sharma; Shweta Tiwari
2011–2012	Kahani Comedy Circus Ki	Shruti Seth	Archana Puran Singh; Sohail Khan	Kapil Sharma; Sumona Chakravarti; and: Krushna Abhishek; Sudesh Lehri
2012–2013	Comedy Circus Ke Ajoobe	Barkha Bisht; Shruti Seth; Shweta Gulati (1 episode)	Archana Puran Singh; Sohail Khan replaced by Arbaaz Khan	Krushna Abhishek; Sudesh Lehri; Siddharth Sagar
2013–2014	Comedy Circus Ke Mahabali	Shruti Seth	Archana Puran Singh; Arbaaz Khan replaced by Sohail Khan for the last few episodes	Season ended before winners were announced.
2018	Comedy Circus 2018	Joanna Robaczewska	Archana Puran Singh; Sohail Khan	

== Production ==
This show was produced by Vipul D. Shah through his TV shows production company Optimystix. It was filmed in studios of Goregaon, Mumbai.

== Comedy Circus 2018 - 2018 contestants ==
- Archana Puran Singh
- Sohail Khan
- Preity Zinta
- Siddharth Sagar
- Paritosh Tripathi
- Mubeen Saudagar
- Balraj Syal
- Anita Hassanandani
- Aditi Bhatia
- Karishma Sharma
- Sana Saeed
- Abhilash Thapliyal
- Ojaswi Aroraa
- Chandan Prabhakar
- Divyansh Dwivedi
- Kunal Chadha
- Shobhit Sinha
- Ajay Bawa

== Comedy Circus Ke Mahabali - 2013 contestants ==
- Archana Puran Singh
- Arbaaz Khan (replaced by Sohail Khan for the last few episodes)
- Shruti Seth
- Krushna Abhishek
- Sudesh Lehri
- Siddharth Sagar
- Mubeen Saudagar
- Shakeel Siddiqui
- Rajiv Thakur
- Mantra
- Balraj Syal
- Rakhi Sawant
- Vinay Pathak
- Purbi Joshi

== Comedy Circus Ke Ajoobe - 2012 contestants ==
- Krushna Abhishek, Sudesh Lehri & Siddharth Sagar (winners)
- Shruti Seth
- Bharti Singh
- Archana Puran Singh
- Purbi Joshi
- Ali Asgar
- VIP
- Anita Hassanandani
- Ojaswi Aroraa
- Swapnil Joshi
- Ragini Khanna
- Mantra
- Surveen Chawla
- Karishma Tanna
- Sohail Khan
- Satish Shah
- Urvashi Dholakia
- Atul Parchure
- Parvati Sehgal
- Arbaaz Khan
- Aditi Bhatia
- Johnny Lever
- Sana Saeed
- Kashif Khan
- Barkha Bisht
- Natasha Sharma
- Riteish Deshmukh
- Jennifer Winget

== Kahani Comedy Circus Ki - 2011 contestants ==
- Kapil Sharma & Sumona Chakravarti (winners)
- Krushna Abhishek & Sudesh Lehri (winners)
- Bharti Singh
- Archana Puran Singh
- Sohail Khan
- Shruti Seth

== Comedy Circus Ka Naya Daur - 2011 contestants ==
- Kapil Sharma & Shweta Tiwari (winners)
- Sudesh Lehri
- Bharti Singh
- Roshni Chopra
- Archana Puran Singh
- Siddharth Jadhav
- Priya Raina
- Rajiv Thakur
- Sohail Khan
- Ather Habib
- Sugandha Mishra
- Krushna Abhishek
- Vishaka Subhedar
- Shweta Tiwari
- Mantra

== Comedy Circus Ke Tansen - 2011 contestants ==
- Kapil Sharma & Ali Asgar (winners)
- Abhas Joshi
- Sudesh Lehri
- Rajiv Thakur
- Sugandha Mishra
- Shibani Kashyap
- Daler Mehndi
- Archana Puran Singh
- Krushna Abhishek
- Maniesh Paul
- Saumya Tandon
- Shweta Tiwari
- Bharti Singh
- Neha Kakkar
- Swapnil Joshi
- Hard Kaur
- Preeti Amin
- Anjum Farooki
- VIP
- Jaswant Singh Rathore
- Sumit Arora

== Jubilee Comedy Circus - 2010 Contestants ==
- Kapil Sharma & Shikha Singh (winners)
- Rajiv Nigam, Rakhi Sawant & Krushna Abhishek (winners)
- Sudesh Lehri
- Bharti Singh
- Koel Puri
- Rajiv Thakur & Saloni Daini
- VIP & Barkha Bisht
- Anand Suryavanshi & Shweta Tiwari

== Comedy Circus Ka Jadoo - 2010 Contestants ==
- Kapil Sharma & Mukti Mohan (winners)
- Archana Puran Singh
- Rajiv Thakur
- Krushna Abhishek
- Shekhar Suman
- Bharti Singh
- Anita Hassanandani
- Kamya Punjabi
- Rajiv Nigam
- Sudesh Lehri
- Abhishek Avasthi

== Comedy Circus Ke Superstars – 2010 Contestants ==
- Kapil Sharma & Parvati Sehgal (winners)
- Kapil Sharma & Natasha Sharma
- Krushna Abhishek & Sudesh Lehri (runner-up)
- Rajiv Thakur & Saloni Daini
- Paresh Ganatra & Bharti Singh
- Sunil Pal & Priya Marathe

== Comedy Circus: Mahasangram – 2010 Contestants ==
Team Purans:

1. VIP & Swapnil Joshi
2. Khyali Saharan & Karishma Tanna

Team Sumans:

1. Krushna Abhishek & Sudesh Lehri
2. Rajiv Nigam & Rajesh Kumar

Team Shettys:

1. Paresh Ganatra, Bharti Singh & Sharad Kelkar
2. Rajiv Thakur, Saloni Daini & Rashmi Desai

== Comedy Circus: 3 Ka Tadka – 2009 Contestants ==
- Sudesh Lehri, Krushna Abhishek, Melissa Pais (winners)
- Parul Chauhan, Bhagwant Mann, & Jennifer Winget
- Anup Soni, Shweta Tiwari, & Rehman Khan
- Sanjay Mishra, Bhairavi Raichura, & Raja Sagoo
- Harsh Chhaya, Tina Dutta, & Jimmy Moses
- Sharad Kelkar, Bharti Singh, & Paresh Ganatra
- Jaswant Singh Rathore, Smita Singh, & Saloni Daini
- Rajiv Thakur, Rashmi Desai, & Saloni Daini

== Dekh India Dekh – 2009 Contestants ==
- Rajesh Kumar as Akbar
- Rajiv Nigam as Birbal
- Ali Asgar as Havildar Kadam
- VIP as Havildar Kale
- Krushna Abhishek as Baiju
- Sudesh Lehri as Bawra
- Gaurav Gera as Malti Manohar Mishra
- Swapnil Joshi as Jignesh Shah
- Tulika Patel as Bhavana Ben Kosher

== Comedy Circus 20-20 – 2009 Contestants ==
- Nigaar Khan and Raja Sagoo (winners)
- Roshni Chopra and Kuldeep Dubey
- Rakshanda Khan and Rehman Khan
- Vinod Kambli and Rajbir Kaur

== Comedy Circus: Chinchpokli to China – 2009 Contestants ==
- Krushna Abhishek & Sudesh Lehri
- Shweta Tiwari & Ashutosh Kaushik
- Kuldeep Dubey & Roshni Chopra
- Ahsaan Qureshi & Payal Rohatgi
- Sucheta Trivedi & Paresh Ganatra
- VIP & Shweta Gulati
- Ali Asgar & Kuldeep Dubey
- Swapnil Joshi & Sharad Kelkar
- Kavita Kaushik & Rajiv Nigam
- Kuldeep Dubey & Rajiv Nigam
- Shailesh Lodha & Neha Marda
- Mona Singh & Rehman Khan
- Khyali Saharan & Nigaar Khan
- Rehman Khan & Sucheta Trivedi
- Kuldeep Dubey & Sucheta Trivedi
- Sidharth Sagar & Nandini Kapoor
- Sunil Sawra

== Comedy Circus: Kaante Ki Takkar – 2008 Contestants ==
Team Purans:

1. Urvashi Dholakia & Shakeel Siddiqui
2. VIP & Swapnil Joshi
3. Khyali Saharan & Karishma Tanna

Team Sumans:

1. Krushna Abhishek & Sudesh Lehri
2. Rajiv Nigam & Rajesh Kumar
3. Kamya Panjabi & Rajiv Thakur

== Comedy Circus 2 – 2008 Contestants ==
- Juhi Parmar & VIP – Winner
- Kamya Panjabi & Rajiv Thakur – 1st Runners-up
- Krushna Abhishek & Sudesh Lehri – 2nd Runners-up
- Apara Mehta & Shailesh Lodha
- Sayantani Ghosh & Kuldeep Dubey
- Sucheta Khanna & Salim Afridi
- Akashdeep Sehgal & Pervez Siddiqui
- Rajesh Kumar & Rajiv Nigam
- Chitrashi Rawat & Rehman Khan

== Comedy Circus – 2007 Contestants ==
- Kashif Khan & Ali Asgar- Winners
- Swapnil Joshi & V.I.P.- Runner-up
- Khyali Saharan & Karishma Tanna- Voted Out
- Urvashi Dholakia & Shakeel Siddiqui – Voted Out
- Kiran Karmakar & Sunil Sanwra – Voted Out
- Pratap Faujdar & Ketaki Dave (replaced by Manini De) – Voted Out
- Varun Badola & Deepak Dutta – Voted Out
