= Preeti Simoes =

Indian television producer (born 1988)

- Born: July 31, 1990 (age 36); Bombay (present-day Mumbai), Maharashtra, India
- Occupation: Television producer
- Years active: 2007–present
- Partner: Kapil Sharma (2010–2018)

Preeti Simoes (born 31 July 1990) is an Indian television producer.

She has produced Aakhri Sach on JioHotstar, Dil Diyan Gallan With Sonam Bajwa, Comedy Nights with Kapil, The Kapil Sharma Show, Kanpurwale Khuranas, Gangs of Filmistaan and Sunita Ahuja's show on YouTube. Simoes is well known for her romantic relationship with Indian stand-up comedian Kapil Sharma.

== Early and personal life ==
Preeti Simoes was born on 31 July 1990 in Bombay (now Mumbai). She has a sister, Neeti Simoes, who works alongside her in television show productions. Together, Preeti and Neeti have produced several popular Hindi TV comedy shows.

== Career ==
Simoes worked with Kapil Sharma on his show Comedy Nights with Kapil for Colors TV as a creative director.

Later, Preeti started her own show The Drama Company on Sony TV with Krushna Abhishek.

On 24 July 2017, Preeti Simoes started her own production house, named it as The Little Frodo. Preeti-Nreeti produce shows together and have made multiple show with Sunil Grover, Manish Paul and others. In 2018, Preeti-Neeti produced the show, Dan Dana Dan starring Sunil Grover and Shilpa Shinde.

In August 2022, Simoes Sisters started filming their upcoming Disney+ Hotstar webseries in Delhi. The series, Aakhri Sach, premiered on 25 August 2023, with Tamannaah Bhatia in the lead role along with Abhishek Banerjee, Shivin Narang, Gehna Seth, Nikhil Nanda and Rahul Bagga.

== Controversy ==
Kapil Sharma filed a police complaint against Vicky Lalwani, Preeti Simoes and Neeti Simoes, for trying to extort INR 25 lakhs from him as well as alleging in a police complaint that both sisters used to take money from the people who arrived in Film City, Mumbai to see his show and orchestrated misunderstandings between him and fellow comedians of his show and arriving guests. Simoes condemned all of these allegations and brushed them off as false and made-up stories. She also claimed she had been Sharma's girlfriend for 8 years until his engagement. She and her sister Neeti Simoes worked in Kapil Sharma's production since eight years until 2017. She claimed that trouble erupted between Preeti and Kapil after he announced his engagement with Ginni Chatrath in March 2017. After the controversial fight between Kapil Sharma and his team on a flight from Australia, Simoes left the show.

== Filmography ==
Title	TV channel	Role
Comedy Circus	Sony TV	Creative director
Comedy Nights with Kapil	Colors TV	creative director
Kanpur Wale Khuranas	Star Plus	producer
The Kapil Sharma Show	Sony TV	celebrity co-ordinator, executive producer
Jio Dhan Dhana Dan	Jio TV	producer
The Drama Company	SonyTV	producer
Gangs of Filmistan	Star Bharat	producer
Movie Masti with Manish Paul	Zee TV	producer
Aakhri Sach	Disney+Hotstar	producer

She has also produced and directed YouTube shows with Sunita Ahuja, wife of actor Govinda and actress Sonam Bajwa's show Dil Diyan Gallan With Sonam Bajwa.
