= Firoz Khan =

Indian actor

- Born: Firoz Khan
- Occupation: Actor
- Years active: 1984–present
- Known for: Mahabharat
- Spouse: Kashmira
- Children: 3 (including Jibraan Khan)

Arjun Firoz Khan is an Indian actor, best known for playing the character of warrior Pandava prince Arjuna in B. R. Chopra's epic television series Mahabharat. He has also acted in negative roles in several Hindi language movies and television series.

== Personal life ==
Firoz Khan belongs to a Pashtun family of the Afridi clan with ancestral roots in Peshawar, Pakistan. Khan is married to Kashmira. The couple has three children – a son and two daughters. His son, Jibraan Khan is also an actor who played the role of Dhruva in Vishnu Puran and the lead role of Sahir Singh Rajput in the 2024 movie Ishq Vishk Rebound.

Due to the similarity with the name of actor Feroz Khan, he changed his name to Arjun professionally, with suggestions from B. R. Chopra and Rahi Masoom Raza, the director and the writer of Mahabharat respectively.

== Filmography ==
=== Films ===
Year	Title	Role	Notes
1984	Manzil Manzil	Rupesh	
1985	Zabardast	Bikram Singh	
1986	Swati	Manohar Joshi	
1986	Mazloom	Rajan Vijay Singh	
1988	Kanwarlal	Jaggan Singh	
1988	Qayamat Se Qayamat Tak	Ratan Singh	
1988	Khatron Ke Khiladi	Arjun Singh	
1988	Jungle Ki Beti		
1989	Ajeeb Itefaq	Singer	Guest role
1990	Sher Dil	Rapist	
1991	Naya Zaher	Inspector Vikram	
1992	Kal Ki Awaz	DSP Singh	
1992	Jigar	Duryodhan	
1992	Tirangaa	Rasik Nath Gundaswamy	
1993	Game	Raghu	
1993	Phool Aur Angaar	Kaalicharan	
1993	Aadmi	Trikaal's Goon	
1994	Mr. Azaad	Hiravat Mishra's Son	
1994	Brahma	Sunder	
1994	Aa Gale Lag Jaa	Sikander Khanna	
1994	Zaalim	Vinod	
1995	Karan Arjun	Naahar Singh	
1995	The Don	ACP Patil	
1995	Kalyug Ke Avtaar	Vicky	
1996	Hum Hain Khalnayak	Film Producer (Role)	
1996	Saajan Chale Sasural	Thakur's Son	
1996	Rangbaaz	Goga	
1996	Hello Daddy	Ji Jo	Kannada film
1997	Mohabbat	Goon	
1997	Do Ankhen Barah Hath	Police Inspector	
1997	Raja Ki Aayegi Baraat	Police Inspector Feroz Khan	Guest role
1997	Vishwavidhaata	Goon	
1998	Barood	Singhal's Man	
1998	Tircchi Topiwale		
1998	Mehndi	Billoo	
1998	Mafia Raaj	Jacky Jackal	
1999	Maa Kasam	Inspector Gashal	
1999	Lohpurush	Babu Hatela/Inspector Kulkarni	
1999	Hogi Pyaar Ki Jeet	Arjun Singh	
1999	Dada	Hitman	
2000	Jwalamukhi	Nagarjuna	
2001	Jodi No.1	Monty	
2001	Arjun Devaa	Jahangir Khan	
2002	Rishtey	Trainer and Friend	
2003	Kutumba	Jayaraj Patil	Kannada film
2004	Kanchana Ganga		Kannada film
2005	Chand Sa Roshan Chehra		
2006	Yeh Raat	Yograj	
2013	Yamla Pagla Deewana 2	Sikh Inspector in London	
2013	Mahabharat Aur Barbareek	Arjun	
2015	2 Chehare	Tony	
2026	Welcome to the Jungle	Arjun	

=== Television series ===
Year	Serial	Role	Notes
1986	Bahadur Shah Zafar	Nawab Wajid Ali Shah	
1988–1990	Mahabharat	Arjun	
1996	Yug	Peter Gomes	
1997–1998	Betaal Pachisi	Magician	
1997–1998	Mahabharat Katha	Arjun	
1999–2000	Gul Sanobar	Almaas	
2000–2001	Vishnu Puran	Rishi Jamadagni	
2012	CID	Siddarth	
2016	I Don't Watch TV	Himself	Web series
