= Case Toh Banta Hai =

Indian family-friendly sketch comedy show

- Genre: Comedy
- Starring: Riteish Deshmukh; Varun Sharma; Kusha Kapila; Kavin Dave; Paritosh Tripathi; Gopal Datt; Monica Murthy; Sanket Bhosale; Sugandha Mishra; Siddharth Sagar
- Country of origin: India
- Original language: Hindi
- No. of seasons: 1
- No. of episodes: 14

Production
- Production location: Mumbai
- Camera setup: Multi camera
- Running time: 35–40 minutes
- Production company: Banijay Productions

Original release
- Network: Amazon miniTV
- Release: 29 July – 27 October 2022

Case Toh Banta Hai is an Indian Hindi language family-friendly sketch comedy show based in a courtroom setting. The show revolves around the concept of charging a few selected big-time Bollywood celebrities, with funny and "Atrangi" allegations and summoning them to the comedy courtroom. Airing on Amazon miniTV, which is a free streaming platform - available on the Amazon Shopping App.

== Concept ==
This weekly show features a courtroom setup where one Bollywood celebrity is summoned every week and tried for all the "Atrangi" and funny allegations they are charged with. Like an actual courtroom, the show has a defense lawyer to help the celebrity walk away clean and a prosecuting lawyer to prove them guilty of all the charges pressed. A judge to give a verdict. A bailiff to stand behind the judge. And a handful of witnesses to shed light on the incidents relating to the allegations. All of this comes with a twist of comedic and "Atrangi" arguments.

== Cast ==
=== Main cast ===
- Riteish Deshmukh as Prosecuting Lawyer a.k.a. Janta Ka Lawyer
- Varun Sharma as Defense Lawyer a.k.a. Bollywood Insaaf Specialist
- Kusha Kapila as The Judge a.k.a. The Judge That Won’t Budge
- Kavin Dave as Bailiff a.k.a. Dande Waale Bhaiya

=== Recurring cast ===
- Paritosh Tripathi as Witness
- Gopal Datt as Witness
- Monica Murthy as Witness
- Sanket Bhosale as Witness
- Sugandha Mishra as Witness
- Siddharth Sagar as Witness

== List of celebrities appeared on the show ==
- Varun Dhawan ― 29 July 2022
- Anil Kapoor ― 5 August 2022
- Vicky Kaushal ― 12 August 2022
- Kareena Kapoor Khan ― 19 August 2022
- Badshah ― 25 August 2022
- Sara Ali Khan ― 1 September 2022
- Karan Johar ― 8 September 2022
- Pankaj Tripathi ― 15 September 2022
- Rohit Shetty ― 22 September 2022
- Sonakshi Sinha ― 29 September 2022
- Abhishek Bachchan ― 6 October 2022
- Ananya Panday and Chunky Panday - 13 October 2022
- Sanjay Dutt - 20 October 2022
- Shahid Kapoor - 27 October 2022
