= Naila Grrewal =

Indian actress

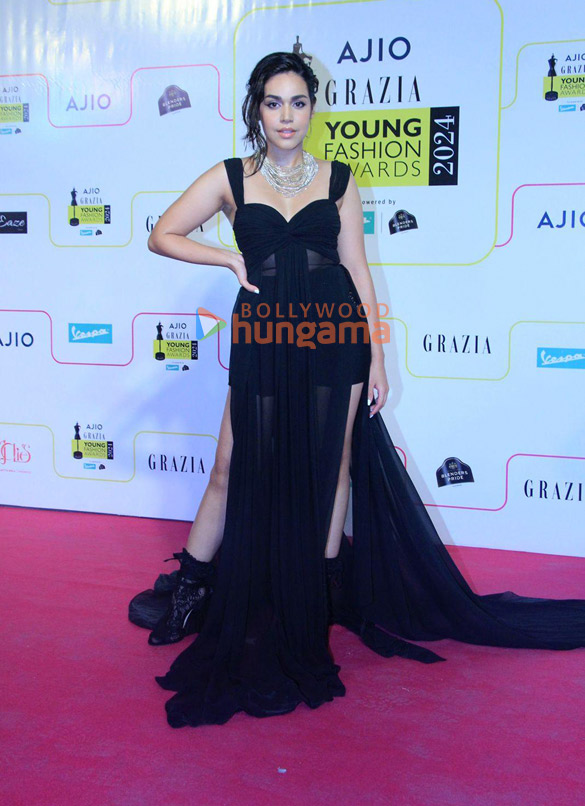
- Naila in 2024
- Born: 24 August 1996 (age 30); Delhi, India
- Education: Indian Institute of Mass Communication
- Occupation: Actress
- Years active: 2015–present
- Known for: Entertainment

Naila Grrewal (born 24 August 1996) is an Indian film and television actress. She is known for her work in Bollywood films and web and television series. Grrewal appeared in movies such as Tamasha (2015), Bareilly Ki Barfi (2017), and Thappad (2020) and later played leading roles in web-series such as Maamla Legal Hai and movie Ishq Vishk Rebound.

== Early life and education ==
Grrewal was born on 24 August 1996 in Delhi, India. She has Indian nationality and grew up in a Punjabi family in New Delhi. Grrewal attended The British School in New Delhi and later studied at Lady Shri Ram College for Women. She also completed further studies at the Indian Institute of Mass Communication.

== Career ==
Grrewal began her career in acting with a small role in the Bollywood film Tamasha (2015), directed by Imtiaz Ali and starring Ranbir Kapoor and Deepika Padukone. This appearance helped her enter the film industry. After her debut, she appeared in other Hindi films including Bareilly Ki Barfi (2017) and Thappad (2020). Her roles in these films helped her gain recognition in supporting parts.

Later expanded her career into digital and television work. She starred in the Netflix courtroom comedy series Maamla Legal Hai, where she played a lawyer and worked with actors such as Tanvi Azmi and Ravi Kishan. To prepare for her role, she observed real lawyers at the Bombay High Court. In 2022, Greewal was cast in the romantic comedy film Ishq Vishk Rebound, a reboot of the 2003 movie Ishq Vishk. In this film, she appeared alongside actors Rohit Saraf, Pashmina Roshan and Jibraan Khan. Grewal has spoken about the importance of this project as a milestone in her career.

== Filmography ==
=== Films ===
| Year | Film | Role | Notes |
|---|---|---|---|
| 2015 | Tamasha | | |
| 2017 | Bareilly Ki Barfi | Babli | |
| 2020 | Thappad | Swati Sandhu | |
| 2024 | Ishq Vishk Rebound | Riya Mathur | |
| 2027 | Raaka | | Telugu film |

=== Television ===
| Year | Film | Role | Notes |
|---|---|---|---|
| 2024 | Maamla Legal Hai | Adv. Ananya Shroff | Netflix series |
