= Ram Jaane =

1995 Indian film by Rajiv Mehra

- Poster
- Directed by: Rajiv Mehra
- Written by: Vinay Shukla
- Produced by: Parvesh C. Mehra
- Starring: Shah Rukh Khan; Juhi Chawla; Vivek Mushran; Pankaj Kapur; Puneet Issar; Tinnu Anand; Deven Verma; Gulshan Grover
- Cinematography: S. Pappu
- Edited by: M.S. Shinde
- Music by: Anu Malik
- Distributed by: Eagle Films
- Release date: 1 December 1995 (India)
- Running time: 168 minutes
- Country: India
- Language: Hindi
- Budget: ₹3.75 crore
- Box office: ₹15.19 crore

Ram Jaane (lit. 'Ram Knows') is a 1995 Indian Hindi-language action thriller film directed by Rajiv Mehra about an unnamed boy (portrayed by Shah Rukh Khan) who grows up to become a gangster. He uses the name Ram Jaane after meeting a priest who, in response to the boy asking what his real name was, said "Ram Jaane" (Ram knows). The film borrows its premise from the 1938 American film Angels with Dirty Faces and the 1992 Bengali film Purushottam. It is the fourth time Khan played a negative role after Baazigar, Darr and Anjaam. Ram Jaane was released to a positive reception from audiences and was a commercial success. Khan bought the rights to this film under his banner, Red Chillies Entertainment. This was the second Rajiv Mehra film to feature Shah Rukh Khan after Chamatkar, in 1992; that film was an average box office success, whereas Ram Jaane proved a hit.

== Plot ==
A nameless boy, who was abandoned at a very young age by his parents, faces taunts from the other children in his village for not having a name. One day, he sadly asks a priest what his name is, to which the priest answers "Ram Jaane" (Ram knows), which the boy accepts as his name. Ram Jaane and his friend Murli are caught stealing from a train by a corrupt police officer, Chewte. Chewte beats Ram Jaane in jail, but he is released without charge. Years later, Ram Jaane is now working for Sameer Sanavla who treats him like his own son. One day Sanavla is murdered by the now promoted Inspector Chewte and when Ram Jaane attempts to kill Chewte, he is again put in jail and brutally assaulted. When released from prison, Ram Jaane is taken by Murli to "Apna Ghar", a home set up for the homeless. Murli believes that this is the best way to reform him, showing the difference between Murli and Ram Jaane and how they turned out. It is at Apna Ghar where Ram Jaane is reunited with his childhood friend Bela, whom he is in love with.

However, even in Apna Ghar, Ram Jaane still remains a criminal and even manages to influence the children in the house to follow in his footsteps. Apna Ghar is soon targeted by Baweja, a criminal with a vendetta for Ram Jaane. Baweja orders his gang to attack Apna Ghar and all its residents, which Ram Jaane is able to thwart. Ram Jaane eventually retaliates by shooting Baweja in the head. Chewte learns of Baweja's death and is determined to have his murderer put in prison. He approaches Apna Ghar and starts beating one of the children, which leads to Murli and the others attacking Chewte and his fellow officers. In the riot, one child gets killed. Murli blames Ram Jaane for this tragedy and Ram Jaane runs away. He attempts to make Bela run away with him (as he believes she loves him), but she refuses. Bela is, in fact, in love with Murli who had already reciprocated her feelings secretly, as he realized that Ram Jaane also loved her. Murli begs Bela to attempt to reform Ram Jaane. However, whilst trying to reform him, Bela begins to dislike him for his criminal ways. Bhau, Ram Jaane's rival and Technicolour, Ram Jaane's former partner in crime hatch a plot to kill Ram Jaane who kills them both upon discovering this plot and rushes to Apna Ghar to stop their henchmen from killing anyone. Eventually, Chewte arrives on the scene but is shot by Ram Jaane as a payback for the years of torture inflicted upon him.

Ram Jaane is taken to court where he confesses to all of his crimes. The court decides that he must be sentenced to death. The boys of Apna Ghar are in awe of Ram Jaane, as he plans to "die with a smile." The boys think this is courageous and plan to follow in his criminal footsteps. Murli pleads with Ram Jaane not to die bravely, so the boys won't want to follow his path, but Ram Jaane refuses. On the day of his death, with Murli and the boys watching, Ram Jaane feigns fear, crying and pleading for his life. One by one, the boys remove their red headbands, the symbol of being members of Ram Jaane's gang. After his death, Bela and Murli read a letter from Ram Jaane which he had written to Bela. It states that he feels guilty for everything he had done and that he had planned intentionally for Bela to leave him and to go back to Murli.

== Cast ==
- Shahrukh Khan as Ram Jaane
- Juhi Chawla as Bela
- Vivek Mushran as Murli
- Pankaj Kapur as Pannu Technicolor
- Puneet Issar as Inspector Chewte
- Tinnu Anand as Sameer Sanavla
- Deven Verma as Daddu Uncle
- Gulshan Grover as Bhau
- G.P Singh as Baweja Builder
- Arun Bali as Paowala Baba
- Amritpal as Mirchi
- Chandu Parkhi as Drunkyard
- Brownie Parasher as Amar
- Ali Asgar as Junior Pannu
- Javed Rizvi as Sabir (Sargam Gang)

== Soundtrack ==
The music is composed by Anu Malik and the lyrics are written by Anand Bakshi. The soundtrack is available on PolyGram (now Universal Music India). Upon release, "Ram Jaane" and "Phenk Hawa Mein Ek Chumma" became popular.

#	Title	Singer(s)	Length
1	"Ram Jaane"	Udit Narayan, Sonu Nigam, Alka Yagnik	07:35
2	"Ram Jaane" (Sad)	Udit Narayan	01:01
3	"Pump Up The Bhangra"	Bali Brahmbhatt	06:16
4	"Phenk Hawa Mein Ek Chumma"	Abhijeet Bhattacharya, Anuradha Sriram	06:20
5	"Ala La La Long..."	Udit Narayan	06:15
6	"Chori Chori O Gori"	Udit Narayan, Sadhana Sargam	06:49
7	"Bum Chiki Chiki Bum"	Abhijeet, Sadhana Sargam & Udit Narayan	05:52

== Box office ==
Ram Jaane grossed ₹14.50 crore (US$1.5 million) in India and $200,000 (₹69.50 lakh) in other countries, for a worldwide total of ₹15.19 crore (US$1.6 million), against its ₹3.75 crore (US$390,000) budget. It had a worldwide opening weekend of ₹2.99 crore (US$310,000), and grossed ₹5.30 crore (US$550,000) in its first week.

=== India ===
It opened on Thursday, 30 November 1995, across 175 screens, along with Akele Hum Akele Tum, starring Aamir Khan. It earned ₹62 lakh (US$65,000) nett on its opening day, and grossed ₹1.78 crore (US$190,000) nett in its opening weekend. It had a first week of ₹3.15 crore (US$330,000) nett, and grossed ₹1.97 crore (US$210,000) nett and ₹1.23 crore (US$130,000) nett in its second and third week respectively. The film earned a total of ₹8.60 crore (US$900,000) net. This is the only time when the films of Shah Rukh Khan and Aamir Khan clashed at the box office. Ram Jaane was ahead from day one and remained there through the run, earning a "Hit" verdict by Box Office India, while Akele Hum Akele Tum was declared a "Flop". It remains one of the fan favourites of Shah Rukh Khan's films and his acting was appreciated in it.

=== Overseas ===
Ram Jaane also managed to fare better overseas, despite Akele Hum Akele Tum having the more overseas friendly genre. It earned a total of $200,000 (₹69.50 lakh) outside India.

'Ram Jaane' worldwide collections breakdown
Territory	Territory wise Collections break-up
India	Nett Gross: ₹8.60 crore (US$900,000)
India	Distributor Share: ₹4.60 crore (US$480,000)
India	Total Gross: ₹14.50 crore (US$1.5 million)
International (Outside India)	$200,000 (₹69.50 lakh)
Worldwide	₹15.19 crore (US$1.6 million)
