= Kusha Kapila =

Indian social media personality

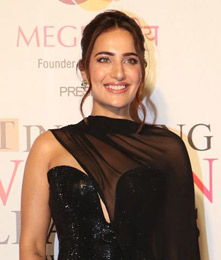
- Kapila in 2025
- Born: New Delhi, India
- Education: IP College; NIFT
- Occupations: Social media personality; comedian; actress
- Years active: 2013–present
- Notable work: Comicstaan; Sukhee; Thank You for Coming
- Spouse: Zorawar Singh Ahluwalia (m. 2017–2023)

YouTube information
- Channel: Kusha Kapila
- Genre: Comedy
- Subscribers: 1.38 million
- Views: 675 million
- Last updated: 18 November 2024

Kusha Kapila is an Indian social media personality, comedian and actress from New Delhi.

== Personal life ==
Kusha Kapila was born in New Delhi into a Punjabi family.

She married Zorawar Singh Ahluwalia, a former employee at Diageo in 2017. On 26 June 2023, she announced their separation.

== Career ==
After graduation from the National Institute of Fashion Technology in fashion design, she worked briefly in fashion merchandising and content roles before transitioning to digital media. In 2013, she started working as a fashion correspondent for a Delhi-based clothing firm, Apparel Online. In May of next year, she joined Razorfish Neev and started working as a copywriter.

In 2014, she made her debut with the television show Son of Abish hosted by Abish Mathew.

In 2016, she worked for the Times Internet as a fashion editor. Later, she joined iDiva as a content writer head. While working for iDiva, she created and played the fictional character, Billi Masi, which became a major hit, making her an Internet sensation.

In 2020, she appeared in an anthology Netflix India film Ghost Stories. She was also on Netflix India's YouTube show Behensplaining.

In 2021, she performed in the Amazon Prime's comedy reality show LOL: Hasse Toh Phasse.

In 2022, she was seen in a reality sketch comedy show Case Toh Banta Hai on Amazon MiniTV. She also featured in the Season 2 of the Netflix TV series Masaba Masaba. She co-hosted the season 3 of Comicstaan. She made an appearance in Plan A Plan B. She also appeared as a part of jury on Season 7 of the Koffee with Karan.

In February 2023, she appeared in Minus One: New Chapter and Selfiee. Later that year, in September, she featured in Sukhee alongside Shilpa Shetty. She also played a pivotal role in Rhea and Ekta Kapoor's Thank You for Coming, which premiered at the 2023 Toronto International Film Festival. Later in December, she was seen in Amazon Mini TV's Dehati Ladke.

== Off-screen work ==
In March 2025, Kapila co-founded UnderNeat, a women’s innerwear and shapewear brand, with entrepreneurs Vimarsh Razdan and Ghazal Alagh. The brand was launched following a month-long content campaign titled "What Are You Wearing Under?", which built community engagement and trust ahead of the official launch.

== Media ==
In 2019, Kusha Kapila featured on the cover of Harper's Bazaar India.

In 2021, Kapila featured in Hindustan Times HT Brunch cover story.

In 2022, she featured on the cover of Cosmopolitan. In the same year, she was listed in Forbes India's W-Power list.

In 2024, she was interviewed by The Lallantop, where she opened up about her personal life and her journey to fame.

In 2026, she was featured in GQ India's list of "Most Influential Young Indians of 2026".

== Filmography ==
=== Films ===
Year	Title	Role	Notes	Ref.
2020	Ghost Stories	Misha	Karan Johar's segment	
2022	Plan A Plan B	Seema	Released on Netflix	
2023	Selfiee	Tara		
2023	Sukhee	Meher Chhibber		
2023	Thank You for Coming	Neha alias "The Queen"		
2024	Ishq Vishk Rebound	Film producer		
2025	Vyarth	Bhumi	Short film	
2025	Saali Mohabbat	Diya	Released on ZEE5	

=== Web series ===
Year	Title	Role	Notes	Ref.
2014	Son of Abish	Herself		
2021	LOL: Hasse Toh Phasse	Herself		
2022	Comicstaan	Host	Season 3	
2022	Masaba Masaba	Nicole	Season 2	
2022	Case Toh Banta Hai	Judge		
2023	Minus One: New Chapter	Nayantara		
2023	Social Currency	Herself	Episode 5	
2023	Dehati Ladke	Chaya		
2024	Life Hill Gayi	Kalki		
2026	Maamla Legal Hai	Adv. Naina Arora	Season 2	

=== Music video appearances ===
Year	Title	Singer	Ref.
2023	"O Piya"	Prateek Kuhad	

== Awards and nominations ==
Year	Award	Category	Work	Result	Ref.
2022	Indian Television Academy Awards	Best Actress – Comedy Series (OTT)	Case Toh Banta Hai	Nominated	
2023	Bollywood Hungama Style Icons	Most Stylish Digital Entertainer (Female)	—N/a	Nominated	
2024	Filmfare OTT Awards	Best Supporting Actor in a Series (Female): Drama	Dehati Ladke	Nominated	
