= Thank You for Coming =

2023 Indian Hindi language comedy-drama film directed by Karan Boolani

- Theatrical release poster
- Directed by: Karan Boolani
- Written by: Radhika Anand; Prashasti Singh
- Produced by: Shobha Kapoor; Anil Kapoor; Ekta Kapoor; Rhea Kapoor
- Starring: Bhumi Pednekar; Shehnaaz Gill; Dolly Singh; Kusha Kapila; Shibani Bedi
- Cinematography: Anil Mehta
- Edited by: Shweta Venkat Matthew; Manan Ajay Sagar
- Music by: Songs: QARAN; The Jamroom; Hanita Bhambri; Vishal Mishra; Aman Pant; Score: Aman Pant
- Production companies: Balaji Motion Pictures; Anil Kapoor Films & Communication Network
- Distributed by: Pen Marudhar Entertainment
- Release dates: 15 September 2023 (TIFF); 6 October 2023
- Running time: 117 minutes
- Country: India
- Language: Hindi
- Budget: ₹45 crores
- Box office: est. ₹9.64 crores

Thank You for Coming is a 2023 Indian Hindi-language sex comedy film directed by Karan Boolani and produced by Rhea Kapoor and Ekta Kapoor. Written by Radhika Anand and Prashasti Singh, the film stars Bhumi Pednekar, Shehnaaz Gill, Dolly Singh, Kusha Kapila and Shibani Bedi.

The film premiered at the 48th 2023 Toronto International Film Festival (TIFF) in the Gala Presentations section on 15 September 2023 and was theatrically released on 6 October 2023 to negative reviews from critics. The film failed at the box office.

== Plot ==
The film follows Kanika Kapoor on a quest for love and sexual pleasure. Kanika, a 32-year-old single woman, lives with her mother, Dr. Bina Kapoor, and her grandmother, Kishori Kapoor. She has affairs with a college friend, a professor and later with Rahul. Despite trying hard she has never had an orgasm. After every break up and at her birthdays, when she is very depressed for being alone, she is cheered up by her best friends Pallavi Khanna and Tina Das.

On her 32nd birthday she has a dream where she has died; upon waking she has an epiphany and decides to marry Jeevan Anand, a businessman, who has been courting her for a long time; however, they have never been physical. Her mother and friends warn her about the shy and naive Jeevan Anand. But given her mother didn’t marry her father and raised her as a single mother, Kanika is terrified of being alone and facing society. Waking up next morning after her engagement ceremony, she has a vague recollection of having an orgasm the night before but she could not recall who it was. All three friends go to investigate who Kanika slept with.

They visit Jeevan Anand and Professor, and later are called to Gurgaon by Rahul who appears as a drag queen and tells Kanika that he was encouraged to be himself. While none of her old flings were with her the night before, her old rivals from school tells her that she saw Karan, Pallavi's husband, leaving Kanika's room in the hotel. Kanika is devastated and drives back with flashes of the night with Karan. Kanika has a minor accident after which she breaks her engagement off with Jeevan. While on the train heading home, she gets a call from Rabeya, Tina's daughter, (whom she earlier advised men are users and to wait to lose her virginity); Rabeya's boyfriend made a video of them having sex and released it on the Internet with it going viral.

As she arrives home, she is attacked by Pallavi who accuses Kanika of sleeping with her husband and Tina fights with Kanika for giving bad advice to her daughter Rabeya but is rescued and consoled by her mother and grandmother. After a long talk with her mother, Kanika recalls the night. Karan had tucked a drunken Kanika in bed and left, after which she masturbates and gets orgasm. She runs off to Rabeya's school where Rabeya is now preparing for a public apology instead of the graduation speech she was supposed to give. Kanika rushes the stage, grabs the mic and encourages women to not be ashamed of their sexual desires. Rabeya follows and refuses to apologise. Pallavi also realizes her mistake and all three friends make up.

The movie ends with Kanika being single and happy.

== Cast ==
- Bhumi Pednekar as Kanika Kapoor
- Dolly Singh as Pallavi Khanna
- Shibani Bedi as Tina Das
- Shehnaaz Gill as Rushi Kalra
- Kusha Kapila as Neha alias "The Queen"
- Natasha Rastogi as Dr. Bina Kapoor, Kanika's mother
- Dolly Ahluwalia as Kishori Kapoor, Kanika's grandmother
- Pradhuman Singh as Jeevan Anand
- Karan Kundrra as Arjun Malhotra
- Gautmik as Karan, Pallavi's husband
- Sushant Divgikar as Rahul/Anjali
- Saloni Daini as Rabeya Das, Tina's daughter
- Anil Kapoor as a professor (special appearance)

== Soundtrack ==
Thank You for Coming

Soundtrack album by QARAN, The Jamroom, Hanita Bhambri, Vishal Mishra and Aman Pant
- Released: 6 October 2023
- Genre: Feature film soundtrack
- Length: 22:16
- Language: Hindi
- Label: Saregama

Official audio
- Thank You for Coming on YouTube

The music of the film is composed by QARAN, The Jamroom, Hanita Bhambri, Vishal Mishra and Aman Pant while lyrics are written by QARAN, IP Singh, Siddhant Kaushal, Raajesh Johri, Hanita Bhambri, Kumaar and Farmaan.

The song Pari Hoon Main is remake version of the famous Suneeta Rao's song Paree Hoon Main from the album Dhuan (1991).

Track listing
No.	Title	Lyrics	Music	Singer(s)	Length
1.	"Desi Wine"	QARAN, IP Singh	QARAN	QARAN, Nikhita Gandhi, The Rish, Arjun	2:51
2.	"Haanji"	QARAN, Siddhant Kaushal	QARAN	QARAN, The Rish	3:13
3.	"Pari Hoon Main"	Raajesh Johri	The Jamroom	Sunidhi Chauhan, Sushant Divgikr	3:19
4.	"Pari Hoon Main" (Jazz Version)	Raajesh Johri	Aman Pant	Devashree Manohar	1:41
5.	"Chehra 2.0"	Hanita Bhambri	Hanita Bhambri	Hanita Bhambri	4:07
6.	"Duniya Farzi"	Kumaar	Vishal Mishra	Vishal Mishra, Nikhita Gandhi, Hansika Pareek	3:30
7.	"Nach Nach"	Farmaan	Aman Pant	Aman Pant, Rashmeet Kaur	3:05
Total length:					22:16

== Release ==
The film premiered at the 48th 2023 Toronto International Film Festival (TIFF) in the Gala Presentations section on 15 September 2023 and was theatrically released on 6 October 2023 to positive reviews from critics. It released on the streaming platform, Netflix on 1 December 2023.

== Marketing ==
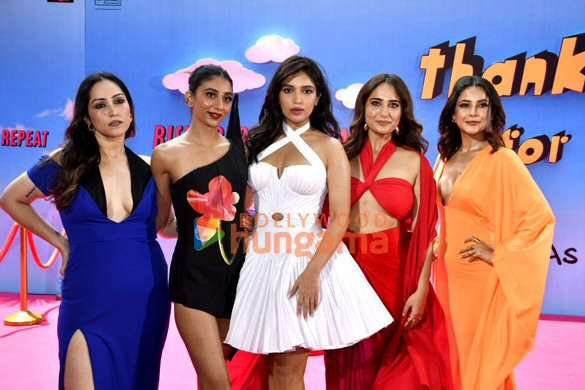
Bedi, Singh, Pednekar, Kapila and Gill at the trailer launch of their film Thank You For Coming

The marketing of the film involved a month long promotional tour with Pednekar, Gill, Singh, Bedi and Kapila that included many fan events and the 2023 Toronto International Film Festival (TIFF).

== Reception ==
=== Critical reception ===
Thank You for Coming received mixed reviews from critics. On the review aggregator website Rotten Tomatoes, 79% of 14 critics' reviews are positive, with an average rating of 6.5/10.

Shubhra Gupta of The Indian Express gave the film 3/5 stars stating, "Bhumi Pednekar film is a heartfelt slap in the face of the zillions of movies that are about privileged boys and their putrid toys". Marya E. Gates of Indie Wire gave the film a B− stating, "Anand and Singh’s script tries to tackle too many thematic issues, ultimately short-changing most of them. However, it’s hard to deny Pednekar’s irrepressible charm."

In a more positive review, Meera Navlakha of Mashable stated, "If its purpose is to serve as a feminist romp for modern India, it succeeded – and executed with fun. This is a welcome addition to the genre, reinforcing that female stories deserve to be told with humor, light and meaning".

=== Box office ===
Thank You for Coming had an opening day gross of ₹0.8 crore with an average occupency of 67.52%. The film witnessed a 44% growth gross on day two, grossing ₹1.15 crore but continuously showed decline since.

As of 29 November 2023, Thank You for Coming grossed ₹8.73 crore in India and ₹0.91 crore overseas for a worldwide gross of ₹9.64 crore.
