= Zee Comedy Show =

Indian Hindi-language comedy show

- Genre: Comedy
- Written by: Mahesh Bhalla; Gaurav Dubey; Ankush Kumar
- Directed by: Farah Khan
- Creative director: Sapna Chaudhary
- Starring: Sugandha Mishra; Aditya Narayan; Sanket Bhosale; Farah Khan; Mubeen Saudagar; Ali Asgar; Siddharth Sagar; Punit Pathak; Balraj Syal; Tejasswi Prakash; Nikki Tamboli; Gaurav Dubey; Divyansh Dwivedi; Chitrashi Rawat; Mika Singh
- Country of origin: India
- Original language: Hindi
- No. of seasons: 1
- No. of episodes: 30

Production
- Executive producer: Payal Sodhi
- Producer: Vipul D. Shah
- Production locations: Mumbai, Maharashtra, India
- Camera setup: Multi-camera
- Running time: 28 minutes
- Production company: Optimystix Entertainment

Original release
- Network: Zee TV
- Release: 31 July – 7 November 2021

Zee Comedy Show (also known as Zee Comedy Factory) is an Indian Hindi-language comedy television series which premiered on 31 July 2021. The series airs on Zee TV. It is produced by Optimystix Entertainment. The presenters of this show are Farah Khan, Aditya Narayan, Sugandha Mishra, and others. Farah Khan was replaced by Mika Singh temporarily because she tested positive for COVID-19.
