= Vivek Mushran =

Indian actor (born 1969)

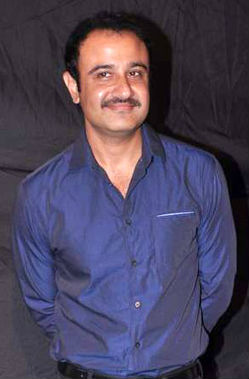
- Vivek Mushran at the Colors Indian Telly Awards, 2012
- Born: 9 August 1969 (age 56); Renukoot, Uttar Pradesh, India
- Occupation: Actor

Vivek Mushran (born 9 August 1969) is an Indian actor who predominantly works in Hindi film productions and television productions. He is from U.P.

He started his career in 1991 with Saudagar and has appeared in many other films. He is also known for his role in STAR Plus's fantasy comedy series Son Pari.

== Career ==
After leaving Sherwood College, Nainital, he started his career in 1991 with Saudagar and has appeared in many other films, including Ram Jaane, the Sachin-directed Aisi Bhi Kya Jaldi Hai, First Love Letter and Anjaane. He has also acted in the STAR Plus TV sitcom Son Pari, the Zee TV serial Kittie Party, and he was seen in the Sony TV serial Bhaskar Bharti and the Doordarshan TV serial Ae Dil-E-Naadaan. The serial he worked in most recently was Baat Hamari Pakki Hai on Sony TV. He has sung songs in his album Kahin Kho Gaya. His latest role was as Inder, Saachi's uncle in Baat Hamari Pakki Hai (Sony TV). He also worked in Parvarrish – Kuchh Khattee Kuchh Meethi. he worked in the serial Nisha Aur Uske Cousins and played the role of the father of the main character. He has also played the role of Vikramjeet Singh in Sony TV series Main Maike Chali Jaungi Tum Dekhte Rahiyo.

== Filmography ==
Year	Title	Role	Notes	Ref.
1991	Saudagar	Vasu Singh		
1991	First Love Letter	Shyam		
1992	Prem Deewane	Manohar		
1992	Saatwan Aasman	Suraj		
1992	Bewaffa Se Waffa	Aslam		
1993	Dil Hai Betaab	Raja		
1993	Insaniyat Ke Devta	Vivek		
1995	Ram Jaane	Murli		
1996	Aisi Bhi Kya Jaldi Hai	Vikram Mehra		
1996	Jaan	Rohit		
1996	Chhota Sa Ghar	Vinay		
1997	Sanam	Gaurav Anand		
1997	Krishna Arjun	Arjun Yadav		
2000	Anjaane			
2001	Uljhan	Prashant		
2005	Kisna	Nandu		
2015	Tamasha	Vivek Ahuja		
2017	Begum Jaan	Master		
2018	Veere Di Wedding	Kshitij "Kuki" Puri		

=== Television ===
Year	Serial	Role
1997–1998	Mausam	
1998–1999	Ashiqui	
2000–2004	Son Pari	Rohit
2001	Ankahee	
2001	Kudrat	Vishal
2009	Bhaskar Bharti	Amarjeet Chaddha
2011–2013	Parvarrish – Kuchh Khattee Kuchh Meethi	Lakhvinder Singh Ahluwalia
2014–2015	Nisha aur Uske Cousins	Ramesh Nemichand Gangwal
2017	Ek Aastha Aisi Bhee	Govind Agarwal
2020	Never Kiss Your Best Friend	Tanie's Father
2020	Marzi	Subodh
2022	Mai	Yash Chaudhary
2024	Maamla Legal Hai	KM Jaitley
2025	Zyada Mat Udd	Satish Khurana
