= Ali Asgar (actor) =

Indian actor and stand-up comedian

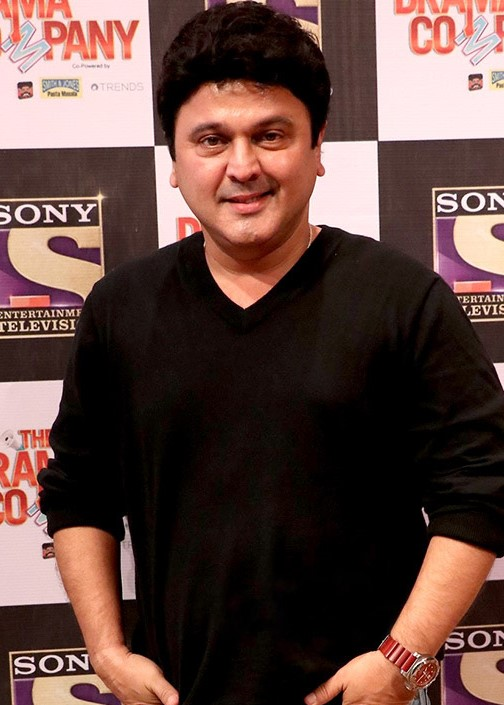
- Asgar attend the press conference of The Drama Company
- Born: Bombay, Maharashtra, India
- Occupation: Actor
- Years active: 1987–present
- Spouse: Khadija Asgar (m. 2002)
- Children: 2

Ali Asgar is an Indian actor and stand-up comedian. He has appeared in many Indian TV serials and movies. Asgar appeared as Kamal Agarwal in Star Plus TV show Kahaani Ghar Ghar Ki. He also appeared in SAB TV's show F.I.R. as Inspector Raj Aryan. He is commonly known for his role in Colors TV show Comedy Nights with Kapil as Dadi.

== Filmography ==
=== Films ===
Year	Film	Role	Notes	Refs
1991	Shikari	Young Adarsh Kumar Shrivastav		
1992	Jaan Tere Naam	Chichi		
1992	Chamatkar	Rakesh		
1993	Khalnayak	Munna		
1994	Baali Umar Ko Salaam	Peter		
1995	The Gambler	Dayashankar's Brother		
1996	Shastra			
1996	Dushman Duniya Ka	Raman		
1999	Pyaar Koi Khel Nahin			
2000	Joru Ka Ghulam	Raju Patel		
2000	Josh	Deven		
2001	Hum Ho Gaye Aapke	Manjeet		
2002	Raaz	Rohit		
2002	Aap Mujhe Achche Lagne Lage	Rohit's friend		
2002	Hum Kisise Kum Nahin	Bablu		
2002	Jeena Sirf Merre Liye			
2004	Aetbaar	Deepak		
2004	Stop!	Rahul		
2005	Shaadi No. 1	H.S Gulati		
2005	Koi Aap Sa	Naina's colleague		
2005	Navra Maza Navsacha	Film director	Marathi-language film	
2007	Partner	Naina's colleague		
2008	Sunday	Raj Khurana's son		
2009	Shortkut	Vikram		
2010	Tees Maar Khan	Burger		
2010	Ideachi Kalpana	Film director	Marathi language film, Special appearance	
2010	332 Mumbai to India			
2015	Solid Patels	Dr. Thanawala		
2017	Judwaa 2	Doctor Lulla		
2018	Pagalpanti	Chhoti Goli		
2019	Amavas	Gotti		
2021	12 'O' Clock	Doctor		
2022	Love You Loktantra			
2023	Shehzada	Arun		
2024	The U P Files			
2024	Navra Maza Navsacha 2	Laundry man	Marathi language film, Special appearance	
2025	Pintu Ki Pappi			

=== Television ===
Year	Series	Role	Notes	Refs
1987	Ek Do Teen Char	Johnny		
1987–1988	Chunauti	Yogesh		
1990	Neev	Manu		
1995–1996	Apne Jaise Types	Sameer		
1996–1998	Itihaas	Mukul		
1997	Aahat	Raj	2 episodes; Memory - Part I and Memory - Part II	
1998	Dil Vil Pyar Vyar	Kuku		
1998–1999	Do Aur Do Paanch	Harsh		
1999	Kartvya	Dheeraj		
2000–2008	Kahaani Ghar Ghar Kii	Kamal aggarwal		
2001–2003	Kutumb	Samay Mittal		
2002	Cactus Flower	Rajiv		
2003	Kya Hadsaa Kya Haqeeqat	Professor Samuel		
2003	Allah Meri Tauba			
2004	Kabhi Khushi Kabhi Dhoom			
2006	Kadvee Khattee Meethi	Karan		
2007–2013	Comedy Circus	Various characters		
2008	Say Shava Shava	Host		
2008	Zara Nachke Dikha	Himself	Captain of Tez Talwaar Ladke (Boys team)	
2009	Ghar Ki Baat Hai	Mr. X		
2009	Voice of India – Mummy Ke Superstars	Host		
2009	Yeh To Hona Hi Tha	Bobby		
2009–2011	F.I.R.	Inspector Raj Aaryan		
2010	Entertainment Ke Liye Kuch Bhi Karega	Himself	Celebrity special episode	
2010	National Bingo Night	Himself		
2011	Shadi 3 Crore Ki	Host		
2012–2014	Jeannie Aur Juju	Captain Vikram "Vicky/Juju" Khanna		
2013–2016	Comedy Nights with Kapil	Dadi and Various characters		
2015	C.I.D.	Himself	2 Episodes ' Ali Ki Khalbali Part I and II'	
2016	Chidiya Ghar	Nathu Nakabandi	Guest	
2016	Woh Teri Bhabhi Hai Pagle	Nathu Nakabandi		
2016–2017	The Kapil Sharma Show	Nani and various Characters		
2017	Trideviyaan	Katappi/Guddu		
2017	Sabse Bada Kalakar	Nurse Laila	Guest appearance	
2017	Super Night with Tubelight	Various Characters	Television special	
2017	Lip Sing Battle	Host		
2017–2018	The Drama Company	Various characters		
2018	Jio Dhan Dhana Dhan	Various characters		
2018–2019	Kanpur Wale Khuranas	Pramod's sister in law		
2019	Movie Masti with Maniesh Paul	Various characters		
2020	Akbar Ka Bal Birbal	Akbar		
2021	Zee Comedy Show	Various characters		
2022	Jhalak Dikhhla Jaa 10	Contestant	16th place	
2022–2023	Favvara Chowk	Ashok Indori		
2024	Wagle Ki Duniya - Nayi Peedhi Naye Kissey	Harish Khanna	Guest appearance	
2026	Family Full House with Rohit Sharma	Guest	Episode 13	

== Dubbing roles ==
=== Live action films ===
Film title	Actor	Character	Dub Language	Original language	Original Year Release	Dub Year Release	Notes
Ayalaan	Siddharth	Tattoo (voice)	Hindi	Tamil	2024	2025	

=== Animated films ===
Film Title	Original Voice	Character(s)	Dub Language	Original Language	Original Year Release	Dub Year Release	Notes
Despicable Me 3	Steve Carell	Gru and Dru	Hindi	English	2017	2017	
Despicable Me 4	Steve Carell	Gru	Hindi	English	2024	2024	

== Awards ==
Year	Awards	Category	Work	Result	Refs
2006	Indian Television Academy Awards	Best Actor/Supporting Role	Kahaani Ghar Ghar Kii	Won	
2008	Indian Television Academy Awards	Best Actor/Supporting Role	Kahaani Ghar Ghar Kii	Won	
2008	Indian Television Academy Awards	Best Anchor – Reality (Music Film) – TV	Say Shava Shava	Won	
2013	Indian Telly Awards	Best Actor in a Comic Role (Jury Award)	Jeannie Aur Juju	Won	
2013	Indian Television Academy Awards	Best Actor/ Supporting Role	Comedy Nights with Kapil	Won	
