= Super Night with Tubelight =

2017 Indian comedy television special

- Title card
- Genre: Sketch comedy Talk show
- Created by: Sunil Grover; Sony TV
- Developed by: Sunil Grover; Sony TV
- Presented by: Aparshakti Khurana
- Country of origin: India

Production
- Running time: 73 minutes

Original release
- Network: Sony Entertainment Television
- Release: 17 June 2017

Super Night with Tubelight is a 2017 Indian comedy television special developed by Sunil Grover and was broadcast on Sony TV. The special episode was hosted by Aparshakti Khurana. It was scheduled to release on 18 June 2017, but got aired a day before; due to the final match of 2017 ICC Champions Trophy between India and Pakistan on 18 June.

The episode was made by Sunil Grover for Salman Khan, where Khan promoted his film Tubelight. Grover reported DNA, "I came back to Sony only for a very special person, Salman Khan. It's a special show dedicated to his new film Tubelight."

== Plot ==
Dr. Mashoor Gulati operates Salman Khan on the stage and it was discovered that a dumbbell, a heater and a deodorant had been stuck inside Salman's abdomen.

Mouni Roy with child artists Masoom, Yogesh and Ditya performs some of the iconic numbers from Salman's films.

After playing the character of the doctor, Grover plays the character of Amitabh Bachchan and hosts Kaun Banega Crorepati Duplicate (spoof of Kaun Banega Crorepati), in which Salman and Sohail participates as contestants. Grover mimics Bachchan and repeating his popular dialogues 'toh computer ko lock kiya jaye'.

The episode also shows few glimpse of Salman's film Maine Pyar Kiya, in which Sugandha Mishra mimics actress Bhagyashree.

Sanket Bhosale mimics Sanjay Dutt while spoofing game show 10 Ka Dum.

The show ends with Jubin Nautiyal singing "Tinka Tinka", Nakash Aziz singing "Kintu Parantu" and Amit Mishra singing "Radio".

== Cast ==
- Sunil Grover as Dr. Mashoor Gulati, Amitabh Bachchan
- Aparshakti Khurana as Host
- Salman Khan as Guest
- Sohail Khan as Guest
- Ali Asgar as Laila, Pigeon
- Chandan Prabhakar
- Sugandha Mishra
- Sanket Bhosale as Sanjay Dutt

== Reception ==
Parmita Uniyal of India Today did not like the episode and said, "Without Kapil, despite all the masala acts the 2-hour special episode somewhere lacked in soul." Subhash K Jha of DNA also did not like the episode and said, "Super Night With Sunil Grover and Salman? Not so super!" He further asked Grover to go back to The Kapil Sharma Show.

However, Maggie Davis of India.com liked the episode and said, "Super Night with Tubelight was indeed a fun-filled episode!"
