= Krishna Arjun =

- Theatrical release poster
- Directed by: Shailendra Shukla
- Produced by: Shailendra Shukla
- Starring: Jeetendra; Vivek Mushran; Karina Grover; Upasna Singh
- Cinematography: Munir Khan
- Edited by: M.I. Shaikh
- Music by: Arup-Pranay
- Production company: Prerna Films International
- Release date: 18 August 1997
- Running time: 130 minutes
- Country: India
- Language: Hindi

Krishna Arjun is a 1997 Indian Hindi-language action film, produced & directed by Shailendra Shukla under the Prerna Films International banner. It stars Jeetendra, Vivek Mushran, Karina Grover, and Upasna Singh with music composed by Arup-Pranay.

== Cast ==
- Jeetendra as Krishna Yadav
- Vivek Mushran as Arjun Yadav
- Upasna Singh as Meera Krishnan
- Rohini Hattangadi as Sharda Yadav
- Ashutosh Rana as Billoo Singh
- Johny Lever as Rocky Dhillon
- Raza Murad as Thakur Shamsher Singh
- Kiran Kumar as Rana Abbas
- Puneet Issar as DIG Hidayath Ali Khan
- Pramod Moutho as Jathashankar Tripathi
- Javed Khan as Sewakram Deshmukh
- Arun Bakshi as Inspector Chatursen Chaubey
- Karina Grover as Poonam
- Birbal
- Jaimini Pathak
- Poorva Joshi

== Soundtrack ==
Music by Arup-Pranay, Lyrics by Nitesh, Yogesh.

		ger
1.	"Andekha Anjaana"	Alka Yagnik, Kumar Sanu
2.	"Jobna Mein Lagi Jwana"	Ila Arun, Alka Yagnik & Khalid Muhammad
3.	"Namasteji Welcomeji"	Asha Bhosle, Abhijeet & Nitesh Raj
4.	"Chhodo Bahut Ho Gayee"	Udit Narayan
5.	"Namasteji Welcomeji"	Asha Bhosle, Abhijeet & Nitesh Raj
6.	"Main Hoon Krishna Tu Hai Arjun"	Suresh Wadkar, Kumar Sanu
7.	"Aaya Kaisa Din Suhana"	Kumar Sanu, Alka Yagnik
8.	"Chhodo Bahut Ho Gayee"	Udit Narayan
9.	"Tumne Yeh Kar Dala"	Alka Yagnik, Ila Arun & Khalid Muhammad
