= Maamla Legal Hai =

2024 Indian television series

- Official release poster
- Genre: Legal drama Comedy drama
- Created by: Sameer Saxena; Saurabh Khanna; Kunal Aneja
- Showrunner: Sameer Saxena
- Directed by: Rahul Pandey
- Starring: Ravi Kishan; Nidhi Bisht; Yashpal Sharma; Tanvi Azmi; Naila Grrewal; Anant V Joshi; Gautam Rode
- Music by: Rohit Sharma; Nilotpal Bora
- Country of origin: India
- Original language: Hindi
- No. of seasons: 2
- No. of episodes: 16

Production
- Executive producer: Sameera Saxena
- Producers: Sameer Saxena; Amit Golani; Saurabh Khanna; Biswapati Sarkar
- Cinematography: Milind Prakash Jog
- Editors: Chandrashekhar Prajapati; Divesh Sonvania
- Running time: 27–42 minutes
- Production company: Posham Pa Pictures

Original release
- Network: Netflix
- Release: 1 March 2024 – present

Maamla Legal Hai is a Hindi language legal comedy drama television series released on Netflix. It is directed by Rahul Pandey and co-written by Saurabh Khanna and Kunal Aneja. It stars Ravi Kishan, Anant V Joshi, Nidhi Bisht, Naila Grrewal, Tanvi Azmi, and Yashpal Sharma. The series premiered on Netflix on 1 March 2024. The series was renewed for a second season in April 2024 which premiered on 3 April 2026.

== Premise ==
At District Court Patparganj, where eccentric staff members strive to dispense justice but not without a few objections, chaos collides with the letter of the law.

== Cast ==
- Season 1
- Ravi Kishan as Adv. Visheshwar D. Tyagi, Principal District Judge in Season 2
- Naila Grrewal as Adv. Ananya Shroff
- Anant V Joshi as Patparganj District Court Manager Vishwas Pandey
- Yashpal Sharma as Adv. Mahendra Phorey
- Nidhi Bisht as Adv. Sujata Negi alias "Sujata Didi"
- Brijendra Kala as Adv. PP
- Vijay Rajoria as Adv. Jagdish Gupta alias Munshi Ji
- Anjum Batra as Adv. Lakhmir Singh Balli alias Mintu
- Rajendra Gupta as Sarveshwar Tyagi, VD Tyagi's Father
- Vikram Pratap as Order
- Amit Vikram Pandey as Law alias Nikunj
- Tanvi Azmi as Judge Bainsla
- Vivek Mushran as KM Jaitley
- Pooja Shyam Prabhat as Varsha
- Adithi Kalkunte as SI Shyamali
- Kumar Saurabh as Shambhu
- Sam Mohan as Mangal Dheema
- Vijay Raaz as Narrator
- Ajay Raju as Villager
- Vijayant Kohli as Judge Sunil Pathak
- Garima Vikrant Singh as Adv. Sagarika
- Sudhir Sangwan as Inspector PEPSU
- Abhishek Sharma as Adv. Lallan Bagai
- Bishwanath Bhattacharya as Judge Ghosh
- Season 2
- Kusha Kapila as Naina Arora
- Dinesh Lal Yadav as Banaspati
- Dibyendu Bhattacharya as Judge Shubhkela / Sajjan Patnaik
- Prasanna Bisht as Sonam
- R Badree as Bipin Topo
- Arnav Bhasin as Nihal
- Gautam Rode as Danish Chandani
- Anand Tiwari as Sachin Kumar
- Raajeshwari Arora as Mrs. Baweja
- Poonam Mathur as Sharma Aunty
- Kamna Pathak as Pramila Kapoor
- Tenzein Choden as Maya Tamang

== Episodes ==
| Series | Episodes | Originally released |
|---|---|---|
| 1 | 8 | 1 March 2024 |
| 2 | 8 | 3 April 2026 |

=== Season 1 ===
| No. overall | No. in season | Title | Directed by | Written by | Original release date |
|---|---|---|---|---|---|
| 1 | 1 | "Egregious" | Rahul Pandey | Saurabh Khanna, Kunal Aneja | 1 March 2024 |
| 2 | 2 | "Darwaza" | Rahul Pandey | Saurabh Khanna, Kunal Aneja | 1 March 2024 |
| 3 | 3 | "Dignity" | Rahul Pandey | Saurabh Khanna, Kunal Aneja | 1 March 2024 |
| 4 | 4 | "Aukaat" | Rahul Pandey | Saurabh Khanna, Kunal Aneja | 1 March 2024 |
| 5 | 5 | "Touch" | Rahul Pandey | Saurabh Khanna, Kunal Aneja | 1 March 2024 |
| 6 | 6 | "Biradari" | Rahul Pandey | Saurabh Khanna, Kunal Aneja | 1 March 2024 |
| 7 | 7 | "Kutai" | Rahul Pandey | Saurabh Khanna, Kunal Aneja | 1 March 2024 |
| 8 | 8 | "Law vs Justice" | Rahul Pandey | Saurabh Khanna, Kunal Aneja | 1 March 2024 |

=== Season 2 ===
| No. overall | No. in season | Title | Directed by | Written by | Original release date |
|---|---|---|---|---|---|
| 9 | 1 | "Without Fear or Favour" | Rahul Pandey | Kunal Aneja, Syed Shadan, Mohak Aneja | 3 April 2026 |
| 10 | 2 | "Unbiased" | Rahul Pandey | Kunal Aneja, Syed Shadan, Tatsat Pandey, Mohak Aneja | 3 April 2026 |
| 11 | 3 | "Balanced" | Rahul Pandey | Kunal Aneja, Syed Shadan | 3 April 2026 |
| 12 | 4 | "Emotional Attachment" | Rahul Pandey | Kunal Aneja, Syed Shadan, Mohak Aneja | 3 April 2026 |
| 13 | 5 | "Juvenile" | Rahul Pandey | Kunal Aneja, Syed Shadan, Mohak Aneja | 3 April 2026 |
| 14 | 6 | "Act of God" | Rahul Pandey | Kunal Aneja, Syed Shadan, Tatsat Pandey, Mohak Aneja | 3 April 2026 |
| 15 | 7 | "Compromise" | Rahul Pandey | Kunal Aneja, Syed Shadan | 3 April 2026 |
| 16 | 8 | "Beyond Reform" | Rahul Pandey | Kunal Aneja, Syed Shadan | 3 April 2026 |

== Reception ==
Reviewing for The Indian Express, critic Shubhra Gupta wrote "Not all the episodes work; a couple are lax, and in a few of places the jokey tone is either at odds with the seriousness of the case, or doesn’t land."

India Today gave 3 stars out of 5 and stated "law and justice are two very different beasts". Archika Khurana of The Times of India gave 3.5 stars out of five and said, It is a unique series that transports viewers into the quirky world of the district court of Patparganj.

Aishwarya Vasudevan of OTT Play gave 3.5 stars out of 5 and said in her review that "Maamla Legal Hai does plead guilty to charges of tickling the funny bone in the right way, and it's the infamous cases along with the performances that serve as lawful entertainment."
