= Neev (TV series) =

Indian television series

Neev (lit. Foundation) is an Indian television series broadcast on the Indian Doordarshan network in 1992. The show was 13-episode long, and based on life of students in a boarding school.

The show, shot in Scindia School, Gwalior, was directed by Madan Kumar and produced by Sanjay Khanna. Title song of the show was Dharti par sooraj ki kirnein, sung by Amit Kumar, composed by Sapan Jagmohan and lyrics by Naqsh Layalpuri.

== Plot summary ==
The television show portrays life of students in a higher secondary boarding school (up to class XII). Headboy of the school is Rakesh Kapoor. His friends are Chatterjee, a geek, and Sabby and they have a rival group with schoolmate Francis.

Satish and Anurag Sharma are newcomer students to the school. Shahnaz is their dominating classmate, whose father Mr Khan is a kind and understanding housemaster. Actor Ali Asgar also plays a student.

Lives of students, their pranks, academics, inter-house rivalry, sports, how they adjust to life in a boarding school, and separation from family.
