= Tamasha (2015 film) =

2015 Indian film by Imtiaz Ali

- Theatrical release poster
- Directed by: Imtiaz Ali
- Written by: Imtiaz Ali
- Produced by: Sajid Nadiadwala
- Starring: Ranbir Kapoor; Deepika Padukone
- Cinematography: Ravi Varman
- Edited by: Aarti Bajaj
- Music by: A. R. Rahman
- Production company: Nadiadwala Grandson Entertainment
- Distributed by: UTV Motion Pictures
- Release date: 27 November 2015
- Running time: 139 minutes
- Country: India
- Language: Hindi
- Box office: est. ₹136.63 crore

Tamasha (transl. Scene/Drama) is a 2015 Indian Hindi-language coming-of-age romantic drama film written and directed by Imtiaz Ali and produced by Sajid Nadiadwala from his studio, Nadiadwala Grandson Entertainment. It stars Ranbir Kapoor and Deepika Padukone. The film score and soundtrack album were composed by A. R. Rahman, while the lyrics for the songs were written by Irshad Kamil. Tamasha was filmed in the Indian cities of Shimla, Delhi, Gurgaon, and Kolkata, with additional filming in Tokyo and Corsica. The film tells the story of character Ved Vardhan Sahni (played by Kapoor) in three stages–as a 9-year-old child (played by child artist Yash Sehgal), a 19-year-old adolescent and a 30-year-old adult in a nonlinear narrative.

Tamasha was released on 27 November 2015 to mixed reviews from film critics, who praised the performances of Ranbir Kapoor and Deepika Padukone, but criticized the complexity of the plot. The film grossed ₹136.63 crore worldwide against its budget of ₹87 crore. Despite being an underwhelming commercial success at the time of its release, the film is considered as a cult film specially among the youth.

At the 61st Filmfare Awards, Tamasha received 4 nominations, including Best Actor (Ranbir Kapoor) and Best Music Director (A.R. Rahman), winning Best Lyricist (Kamil for "Agar Tum Saath Ho"). At the 2016 Stardust Awards, the film won Best Actress (Deepika Padukone).

== Plot ==
The film begins as an onstage skit as part of a spectacle by Ved (Ranbir Kapoor) and Tara (Deepika Padukone). The skit presents the monotonous office lives of people in general along with their pasts, which are shown through flashback sequences. The film switches to a flashback, in Shimla, showing Ved (Yash Sehgal), as a kid growing up, being fascinated by the stories narrated by a roadside storyteller (Piyush Mishra) who keeps mixing up his characters.

The film then shifts to a time where Tara meets an adult Ved while both are on a holiday in Corsica. After instantly connecting, they produce an amusing verbal pact to keep their real identities undisclosed, with hopes of not falling in love, as they explore the island together. One of their frequent jovial activities includes pretending to be movie characters where Ved often poses as "Don" and Tara, as "Mona Darling". As their bond grows stronger, Tara realizes she is falling in love with Ved and afterward, decides to leave Corsica. The film moves back to another flashback where a young Ved is seen questioning the storyteller about the reason for happy times ending rapidly, after noticing a sad part in all of his stories.

Back in India, after Tara returns to Kolkata, her father (Nikhil Bhagat) hands over his tea business to her and she expands it by starting a line of tea boutiques, taking the company ahead. Four years later, after going to Delhi for work, she still thinks of Ved and often goes to a spot she knew he frequented. She finally meets Ved and learns he is now a product manager. They reveal their real identities and she becomes excited to spend time with him, ready to act on her initial love for him. However, as they spend time together, she notices how vastly his charismatic persona and carefree attitude has changed. He talks differently, behaves more formally at their dates, and shows up at a fixed time at her place. His monotonous and tedious lifestyle on a daily basis, from morning to evening in a similar pattern, includes him waking up on time, completing the morning chores, wiping the car, ignoring the hijra on the way, helping an elderly woman at his office, giving a presentation for work, and, meeting Tara in the evening. Ved, now more reserved, proposes to Tara with a ring on his birthday but she declines as she is unhappy with this reserved version of him. Ved leaves for his home and on the way, the driver (Ishteyak Khan) tells him about how his dreams of becoming a singer were crushed in earning his livelihood. Ved finally breaks down, narrating through a flashback as he remembers a tense conversation with his father, Brijmohan Sahni (Javed Sheikh), about his career.

Ved ends up upsetting his boss with nonsensical presentations and random behavioral issues in business meetings. As Ved begs Tara to come back to his life, she indirectly informs him she is fixated on his cheerful personality from Corsica instead of his attitude of simply living by societal conventions. After claiming his lively nature to be his true, undiscovered identity and politely asking him to genuinely figure himself out, Tara tearfully expresses her realization of unintentionally hurting him and apologizes. Frustrated and confused, Ved leaves in tears. The next day, he slightly changes his daily routine at the office, gives the ring to the hijra, and afterward gets evicted from his workplace for his continuous mindless actions. Ved returns to Shimla and gets in a tussle with Brijmohan, after telling him he had lost his job and had been wandering around for six months. Ved then gains introspection from a reflection in the mirror, as he decides to meet the old storyteller from his childhood in order to complete his own story. Upon their encounter, the old storyteller criticizes Ved's irrationality and confronts him to complete his own story. This opens Ved's eyes and he goes back to his house where he starts narrating events that happened in their family, using theatrics and metaphors in the form of storytelling to the family audience. Moved by his art of storytelling, Brijmohan forgives him for leaving his job and lets him pursue his life as he wishes.

Ved returns to Delhi and accepts the ring being kindly returned to him by the hijra. Tara, after finishing a business meeting at Oracle in Tokyo, is surprised when Ved shows up back with his gleeful attitude and they both happily begin impersonating characters again. The film goes into a flashback and through a montage sequence, shows Ved in three of his stages as a child, an adolescent, and an adult, sequentially. The film cuts back to the onstage skit again, which is in continuation of the opening scene of the film and the elaborated allegorical spectacle, as Ved and Tara prepare for its conclusion. The film ends with Ved taking a bow amid the applause of the audience.

== Cast ==
- Ranbir Kapoor as Ved Vardhan Sahni (Don)
  - Yash Sehgal as younger Ved Vardhan Sahni
- Deepika Padukone as Tara Maheshwari (Mona Darling)
- Piyush Mishra as Storyteller
- Javed Sheikh as Brij Mohan Sahni, Ved's father
- Himanshu Sharma as Lord Ram, Prince of Ayodhya.
- Ishwak Singh as Tara's friend (guest appearance)
- Sushma Seth as Ved's grandmother
- Vivek Mushran as Vivek Ahuja, Ved's boss
- Arushi Sharma as Samyukta, Ved's History Teacher
- Kshitij Sharma as Theatre Artist
- Kanwalpreet Singh as Dhillon
- Nikhil Bhagat as Mr. Maheshwari, Tara's father
- Ishteyaq Khan as Auto Driver
- Richa Rathore
- Naila Grrewal

== Production ==
=== Development ===
"This thought played in my mind for very long, basically who are we? Sometimes people have to pretend what they have to be, than what they actually are. In front of people, we all have to behave in a certain way, we are in some character. We can't be who we are. I had this thought even as a kid. I think it's coming from there."

— Imtiaz Ali on how he got the film's idea.

In 2013, it was announced that director Imtiaz Ali will be making a film with Ranbir Kapoor and Deepika Padukone in the lead titled, Window Seat. Anushka Sharma was the original choice for the lead actress which later went to Padukone. The title was changed to Tamasha in 2014 which was taken from the lines of poet Ghalib–"Hota Hai Shab-O-Roz Tamasha Mere Aagey" (your most personal thought is your life's biggest spectacle). Ali said that the film is "about the journey of someone who has lost his edge in trying to conform to the society" and about "abrasion and loss of self in attempt to fit in". He called the film "severely intense and personal" story that questions the "systems we get trapped in and crushed childhood dreams".

Talking about the reason behind the working title Window Seat, Ali said: "It's that thought that crosses your mind when you are sitting by the window of a train and watching Ratlam go by and you think, what if I get down from this train? What life awaits me there?". Ali stated that he wanted to create "different tone" for the film and thus made Kapoor look attractive in Corsica and ordinary in Delhi. Both Ali and Kapoor met Teejan Bai for the research for narrations of the Mahabharata in the film. Ali described the characters of Ved and Tara as "storyteller" and "emotionally agile" respectively. He called these characters as the closest to him. When the characters meet for the first time in the film, they decide not to disclose their identities. The film paid homage to actor Dev Anand through this act. Kapoor took classes from mime artists to mimic the requisite dialogues. Pakistan actor Javed Sheikh was cast in the role of Kapoor's father. Aki Narula designed the costumes for Kapoor, whereas Anaita Shroff Adajania for Padukone. The costumes were made according to the different mood of the film.

=== Filming ===
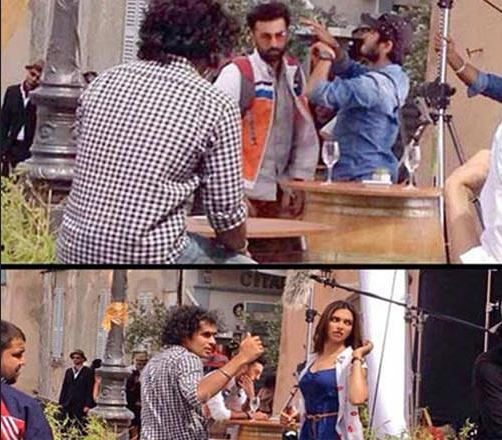
Ali, Kapoor and Padukone filming in Corsica.

Principal photography began in Corsica, France on 9 July 2014 and was wrapped on 30 July 2014. The song "Matargashti" was shot in Bastia. Some portions were shot in Shimla for 15 days featuring flashback sequences of a younger Ved. Tamasha was also shot in Kolkata in January 2015, where Padukone's office scenes were filmed on a set in the office of J Thomas & Co. Pvt. Ltd. The song titled, "Heer To Badi Sad Hain" was shot in Kolkata. The sequence between Kapoor and Padukone before the song "Agar Tum Saath Ho" took over three days to finish as Ali felt it was "emotionally draining" for Kapoor and Padukone. Ali said he was inspired by a real girl he saw in Europe who was continuously crying on a bench and people were coming and going. Padukone did not use glycerin for the scene and cried for real. The following scenes were improvised.

The Delhi schedule of filming began on 29 January 2015. Scenes featuring Kapoor were shot at the Time Tower Business Park in Gurgaon. Padukone joined the same schedule, a day later, beginning the shoot in southern Delhi's Hauz Khas. The schedule was wrapped up by 23 February 2015. Certain scenes were shot in Delhi from 10 March 2015, extending a week further. Majority of the scenes were shot at Bishop Cotton School, Shimla. The next filming schedule began in Tokyo on 8 April 2015 and lasted for two days. Further filming continued in Delhi for five days. In August 2015, the last schedule of filming began at Mehboob Studio in Mumbai. The filming was completed on 6 August 2015. Tamasha was shot in 91 days in Corsica, Shimla, Delhi, Tokyo, Kolkata and Mumbai. Ravi Varman and Aarti Bajaj served as the film's director of photography and editor respectively.

== Themes ==
The film is noted for its portrayal of mental health. Kapoor plays a character who depicts a mental health crisis, showing symptoms of borderline personality disorder.

== Soundtrack ==
The soundtrack album and film score is composed by A. R. Rahman with song lyrics by Irshad Kamil. The soundtrack album's first single "Matargashti" was released on 9 October 2015. The album was released on 16 October 2015 by the record label T-Series.

== Release ==
Tamasha was censored with U/A certificate on 7 November 2015. Scenes with bawdy dialogue references and comments addressing Padukone's character were muted. The censor board claimed it as the most lengthy kissing scene ever on screen, longer than the one picturised between Aamir Khan and Karisma Kapoor in the film Raja Hindustani (1996). On 17 November 2015, The British Board of Film Classification passed the film uncut with PG certificate. The film had a special screening at Yash Raj Studios on 26 November 2015.

The film released on 27 November 2015 at an estimate 2100 number of screens in India and 571 screens overseas.

== Critical response ==
=== India ===
Tamasha garnered mixed reviews from critics upon its theatrical release, praising the film's music, production values, cinematography and lead performances, but criticism was for the complexity of its plot and narration. Bollywood Hungama rated the film 3 out of 5 stars.

Critic Mehul of Deccan Chronicle awarded 4 stars (out of 5) and stated, "Imtiaz Ali, in this film, creates a different world and makes you believe in it till the last shot of the film." Ananya Bhattacharya of India Today gave the film 3.5 stars (out of 5), writing, "In all, Tamasha is vintage wine. There are inhibitions that keep you from falling head-over-heels in love with the film the first time you watch it. Once done away with the initial hesitation, Tamasha is an experience." For The Times of India, critic Priya Gupta said, "The route Tamasha takes is long-winded and plain boring at times." She gave the film 3 stars (out of 5). Pallavi Patra of Zee News gave the film 3.5 stars (out of 5) claimed, " A clear picture of how twisted your life can get under the painful currents of life. All said and done, the clear winners in this 'drama' are the protagonists, more than the story itself."

For The Huffington Post, critic Supratik Chatterjee writes, "Tamasha is, in many ways, a culmination of the recurring themes in Ali's filmography. It is tonally messier than his last film, Highway, but more emotionally satisfying than Rockstar and brings together elements from many of his films in a pleasing-enough manner." Writing for CNN-IBN, film critic Rajeev Masand called Tamasha an uneven film that oscillates between inventive and indulgent, never quite striking a consistent tone. He criticized the script but praised the performances of Kapoor and Padukone. He gave the film 2.5 stars (out of 5). A film critic based at Bollywood Hungama gave the film 2 stars (out of 5) and wrote, "On the whole, Tamasha comes across as a colossal disappointment in spite of towering performances and chemistry between the lead stars." In his review for NDTV, Saibal Chatterjee gave stars (2.5 out of 5) writes, "Tamasha is at best a one-time watch because of the sparkle the leads lend to it. It could have been so much more."

Surabhi Redkar of Koimoi pointed out, "Tamasha is different but not perfect. Ranbir Kapoor and Deepika Padukone deliver fine performances." However, she awarded the film 2.5 stars (out of 5). Critic Shubhra Gupta of The Indian Express reviewed in positive stating, "Deepika is luminous, and she is much more sure-footed in her part. Even though Ranbir gets more space, Tara is drawn with welcome depth." However, she gave the film 2 stars (out of 5). Critic Subhash K. Jha for Firstpost stated, "This is a film that doesn't entirely succeed in its endeavor to decode the heart's enigmatic excursions. But the journey is fascinating and admirable, though not entirely fulfilling." Critic Anupama Chopra, in her review to Hindustan Times writes, "Tamasha starts to feel indulgent and predictable. The writing also gets lazy — Imtiaz settles for stereotypes and simplistic resolutions."

In her review for The Hindu, critic Namrata Joshi called the film "ponderous and protracted". Rachit Gupta of Filmfare mentioned, " Ironically, it has a story that tries to ward off mediocrity in everyday life, and yet the film only manages to evoke mixed reactions. Satya Kandala who gives the film 3 (out of 5 stars) in her review, stated, "Tamasha fall short of true greatness is Ali's indulgence with the characters and situations, which at times makes the film look like it is trying too hard and a little too kitschy."

=== Overseas ===
Andy Webster for The New York Times emphasized reviewing the characters and the direction. In his review, he mentioned, "Imtiaz Ali actually celebrates two love affairs: Ved and Tara's, and (given Ved's universal adulation) with his own self-aggrandizing vision of his calling." In her review for Gulf News, Manjusha Radhakrishnan wrote, "The lead actors and Corsica look picture-perfect, but the movie isn't free of blemishes." Sneha May Franics of Emirates 24/7 opined, "Imtiaz Ali's indulgent narrative isn't quintessential Bollywood, and that's not necessarily bad". In a review for The Guardian, Mike McCahill wrote, "Imtiaz Ali's film is a surprising meta-narrative of archetypal star-crossed lovers, but its cool trickiness leaves little room for surrendering to the story." Deepa Gauri of Khaleej Times awarded the film 4 out of 5 stars and wrote, "Tamasha is un-Bollywood in its rhythm and pace, yet endears you with its essential simplicity." Lisa Tsering of The Hollywood Reporter stated, "The film is a moving meditation on what it means to find out who you really are." In his review for The Express Tribune, Rafay Mahmood gave the film 2.5 stars out of 5, stating: "Great music, exceptional performances and a different take on love don't prevent Imtiaz Ali's Tamasha from culminating in a disappointment." Jay Seaver of Online Film Critics Society noted, "So it's a little bit bigger than a romantic comedy, although still enough of one that the story of a guy finding what he wants to be doesn't overwhelm it. It's not a perfect film, but it's consistently a bit better than expected." Giving the film 2.5 stars out of 5, Mohaiminul Islam's review in The Daily Star opined, "This is Ali's most complex story, teeming with ideas, and gives us Ranbir back again, along with the lovely Deepika, even if the plot keeps losing sight of her."

== Box office ==
=== India ===
Tamasha opened with 40% occupancy on the day of release. The opening day nett figures were ₹10.94 crore (US$1.2 million). On the second day the film collected ₹13.17 crore (US$1.4 million). On the third day, the film raked in ₹14.12 crore (US$1.5 million) nett. The total opening weekend collections of the film were ₹38.23 crore (US$4.1 million) nett.

However, the collections dropped in the beginning of the first week, collecting ₹5.07 crore (US$540,000) on the first Monday. Estimating for individual days until Friday—collections were ₹4.07 crore (US$430,000) nett, ₹3.32 crore (US$350,000) nett, ₹2.77 crore (US$300,000) nett and ₹1.72 crore (US$180,000) nett. On the second Saturday and Sunday, the collections were ₹2.84 crore (US$300,000) nett and ₹3.21 crore (US$340,000) nett respectively. By end of first week, the total collections (on tenth day) were ₹53.46 crore (US$5.7 million) nett.

The collections between eleventh to fourteenth day were ₹2.37 crore (US$250,000) nett. By the end of second week, the total collections stood at ₹63.6 crore (US$6.8 million). The collections between fifteenth to twenty-first day were ₹3.64 crore (US$390,000) nett. By the end of third week, total collections were ₹67.24 crore (US$7.2 million). The collections between twenty-second to twenty-eighth day were ₹2 lakh (US$2,100) nett. By the end of fourth week, total collections were ₹67.26 crore (US$7.2 million). Film's lifetime collection at the Indian Box Office are ₹94.92 crore.

=== Overseas ===
By end of December 2015, the film earned ₹14.88 crore (US$1.6 million) gross in USA and Canada, ₹5.13 crore (US$550,000) gross in United Kingdom, ₹10.84 crore (US$1.2 million) gross in United Arab Emirates and Cooperation Council for the Arab States of the Gulf, ₹1.64 crore (US$180,000) gross in Australia, ₹30 lakh (US$32,000) gross in New Zealand, ₹4.05 crore (US$430,000) gross in Pakistan and ₹18 lakh (US$19,000) gross in Germany. In remaining territories of the world, the film collected ₹2.26 crore (US$240,000) gross. Summing up the collections at Indian and overseas box offices, the film collected an estimate ₹136.63 crore (US$15 million).

== Accolades ==
Award	Date	Category	Recipient(s)	Result	Ref.
BIG Star Entertainment Awards	14 December 2015	Most Entertaining Actor in a Romantic Role – Male	Ranbir Kapoor	Nominated	
BIG Star Entertainment Awards	14 December 2015	Most Entertaining Actor in a Romantic Role – Female	Deepika Padukone	Nominated	
BIG Star Entertainment Awards	14 December 2015	Most Entertaining Romantic Film	Tamasha	Nominated	
Stardust Awards	21 December 2015	Best Actor Of The Year (Male)	Ranbir Kapoor	Nominated	
Stardust Awards	21 December 2015	Best Actor Of The Year (Female)	Deepika Padukone	Won	
Stardust Awards	21 December 2015	Best Director Of The Year	Imtiaz Ali	Nominated	
Stardust Awards	21 December 2015	Best Playback Singer (Male)	Mika Singh (for the song "Heer Toh Badi Sad Hai")	Nominated	
Stardust Awards	21 December 2015	Best Playback Singer (Female)	Alka Yagnik (for the song "Tum Saath Ho")	Nominated	
Producers' Guild Film Awards	22 December 2015	Best Music	A. R. Rahman	Nominated	
Producers' Guild Film Awards	22 December 2015	Best Male Singer	Mohit Chauhan (for the song "Matargashti")	Nominated	
Producers' Guild Film Awards	22 December 2015	Best Female Singer	Alka Yagnik (for the song "Tum Saath Ho")	Nominated	
Screen Awards	8 January 2016	Best Actor (Popular Choice)	Ranbir Kapoor	Nominated	
Screen Awards	8 January 2016	Best Actress (Popular Choice)	Deepika Padukone	Nominated	
Screen Awards	8 January 2016	Best Jodi (Popular Choice)	Ranbir Kapoor & Deepika Padukone	Nominated	
Filmfare Awards	15 January 2016	Best Actor in a Leading Role (Male)	Ranbir Kapoor	Nominated	
Filmfare Awards	15 January 2016	Best Music Director	A. R. Rahman	Nominated	
Filmfare Awards	15 January 2016	Best Lyricist	Irshad Kamil	Won	
Filmfare Awards	15 January 2016	Best Playback Singer (Female)	Alka Yagnik (for the song "Tum Saath Ho")	Nominated	
Zee Cine Awards	18 February 2016	Best Music Director	A. R. Rahman	Nominated	
Zee Cine Awards	18 February 2016	Best Lyricist	Irshad Kamil (for the song "Tum Saath Ho")	Nominated	
Zee Cine Awards	18 February 2016	Best Playback Singer – Male	Mohit Chauhan (for the song "Matargashti")	Won	
Mirchi Music Awards	29 February 2016	Listener's Choice Song of the Year	"Agar Tum Saath Ho"	Won	
Mirchi Music Awards	29 February 2016	Female Vocalist of the Year	Alka Yagnik (for the song "Tum Saath Ho")	Nominated	
Mirchi Music Awards	29 February 2016	Lyricist of the Year	Irshad Kamil (for the song "Tum Saath Ho")	Nominated	
Mirchi Music Awards	29 February 2016	Song of The Year	"Agar Tum Saath Ho"	Nominated	
Times of India Film Awards	18 March 2016	Best Actor in a Leading Role (Female)	Deepika Padukone	Nominated	
Times of India Film Awards	18 March 2016	Best Album	A. R. Rahman	Nominated	
Times of India Film Awards	18 March 2016	Best Lyricist	Irshad Kamil (for the song "Tum Saath Ho")	Nominated	
International Indian Film Academy Awards	26 June 2016	Best Actor	Ranbir Kapoor	Nominated	
International Indian Film Academy Awards	26 June 2016	Best Lyricist	Irshad Kamil (for the song "Tum Saath Ho")	Nominated	
