= The Drama Company =

Indian television show

- Also known as: The Drama Company: Super Nights
- Genre: Sketch comedy
- Country of origin: India
- Original language: Hindi
- No. of seasons: 1
- No. of episodes: 43

Production
- Producers: Preeti Simoes; Neeti Simoes
- Production companies: Little Frodo Productions; Frames Production

Original release
- Network: Sony Entertainment Television
- Release: 16 July 2017 – 14 January 2018

The Drama Company or The Drama Company: Super Nights is an Indian comedy show on Sony Entertainment Television. It premiered on 16 July 2017. It features comedians Krushna Abhishek, Ali Asgar, Sugandha Mishra, Sudesh Lehri, Sanket Bhosale and actor Mithun Chakraborty as permanent guest.

== Cast ==
=== Main ===
- Krushna Abhishek as Various characters
- Ali Asgar as Various characters
- Sanket Bhosale as Baba and Various characters
- Sugandha Mishra as Altaf Jaja, Sidhu and Various characters
- Sudesh Lehri as Bachchan Sahab and Various characters
- Tanaji Galgunde as Various characters
- Mithun Chakraborty as Shambu Dada
- Karan Grover as Host/Presenter
- Aru Krishansh Verma as Various characters
- Ridhima Pandit as Various characters
- Roshni Chopra as Host/Presenter
- Rithvik Dhanjani as Host/Presenter
- Jay Bhanushali as Host/Presenter
- Divyanka Tripathi as Gareena Kapoor (season 2)

=== Guest ===
- Ankit Pathak as Guest Host (episode 17)
- Kashmera Shah as Herself (episode 15)
- Upasana Singh as Hockey Coach (episode 17)
- Sargun Mehta as Herself (episode 22)
- Gautam Mehrishi as Himself (episode 22)
- Ravi Dubey as Guest Host (episode 26–27)
- Shruti Seth as Guest Host (episode 28)
- Suresh Menon as Kachin Tendulkar (episode 30)

== Episode list ==
| No. | Guest(s) | Telecast date | Featured promotion | Ref |
|---|---|---|---|---|
| 1 | Tiger Shroff, Nidhhi Agerwal & Nawazuddin Siddiqui | 16 July 2017 | Munna Michael | |
| 2 | Anil Kapoor, Arjun Kapoor, Ileana D'Cruz and Athiya Shetty | 22 July 2017 | Mubarakan | |
| 3 | Babita Phogat and Pawan Kumar | 23 July 2017 | | |
| 4 | Terence Lewis and Gauahar Khan | 29 July 2017 | | |
| 5 | Aryan Prajapati, Matin Rey Tangu, Dishita Sehgal and Akshat Singh | 30 July 2017 | | |
| 6 | Vivek Oberoi and Richa Chadda | 5 August 2017 | Inside Edge | |
| 7 | Rajkummar Rao, Ayushmann Khurrana, Pankaj Tripathi, Seema Bhargava and Kriti Sanon | 6 August 2017 | Bareilly Ki Barfi | |
| 8 | Shraddha Kapoor, Siddhanth Kapoor | 12 August 2017 | Haseena Parkar | |
| 9 | Ahmed Khan, Geeta Kapoor, Marzi Pestonji | 13 August 2017 | | |
| 10 | Sidharth Malhotra and Jacqueline Fernandez | 19 August 2017 | A Gentleman | |
| 11 | Huma Qureshi and Gurinder Chadha | 20 August 2017 | Partition: 1947 | |
| 12 | Shalmali Kholgade, Amit Mishra and Guru Randhawa | 26 August 2017 | | |
| 13 | Nawazuddin Siddiqui, Bidita Bag and Divya Dutta | 27 August 2017 | Babumoshai Bandookbaaz | |
| 14 | Farhan Akhtar, Inaamulhaq, Ravi Kissen, Deepak Dobriyal, Diana Penty and Ronit Roy | 2 September 2017 | Lucknow Central | |
| 15 | Sunny Deol, Bobby Deol and Shreyas Talpade | 3 September 2017 | Poster Boys | |
| 16 | Sanjay Dutt, Aditi Rao Hydari, Sharad Kelkar and Omung Kumar | 9 September 2017 | Bhoomi | |
| 17 | Raveena Tandon | 10 September 2017 | | |
| 18 | Raveena Tondon, Jubin Nautiyal, Monali Thakur, Nakash Aziz and Divya Kumar | 16 September 2017 | | |
| 19 | Sunny Leone | 17 September 2017 | | |
| 20 | Shilpa Shetty, Geeta Kapoor and Anurag Basu | 23 September 2017 | Super Dancer 2 | |
| 21 | Roast special | 24 September 2017 | | |
| 22 | Saif Ali Khan, Raja Krishna Menon and Svar Kamble | 30 September 2017 | Chef | |
| 23 | Daboo Malik, Amaal Mallik and Armaan Malik | 1 October 2017 | | |
| 24 | Ravi Kishan, Dinesh Lal Yadav, Amrapali Dubey, Rani Chatterjee, Monalisa, Vikrant Singh Rajpoot and Vinay Anand | 7 October 2017 | | |
| 25 | Raveena Tandon, Shekhar Suman, Wadali Brothers and Lakhwinder Wadali | 8 October 2017 | | |
| 26 | Rohit Shetty, Parineeti Chopra, Tabu, Arshad Warsi, Kunal Khemu, Shreyas Talpade, Mukesh Tiwari and Tusshar Kapoor | 14 October 2017 | Golmaal Again | |
| 27 | Rohit Shetty, Parineeti Chopra, Tabu, Arshad Warsi, Kunal Khemu, Shreyas Talpade, Mukesh Tiwari and Tusshar Kapoor | 15 October 2017 | Golmaal Again | |
| 28 | Archana Puran Singh, Sohail Khan and Arbaaz Khan | 21 October 2017 | | |
| 29 | Govinda, Sunita Ahuja and Chunky Pandey | 22 October 2017 | | |
| 30 | Irfan Pathan and Yusuf Pathan | 28 October 2017 | | |
| 31 | Kumar Sanu, Alka Yagnik, Zaira Wasim, Meher Vij and Deep Sharma | 29 October 2017 | Secret Superstar | |
| 32 | Ajay Jadeja, Rajkumar Rao, Kriti Kharbanda, Manpreet Singh, Gurjant Singh, Harmanpreet Singh, S. V. Sunil and Akash Chikte | 4 November 2017 | Shaadi Mein Zaroor Aana | |
| 33 | Irrfan Khan and Parvathy | 5 November 2017 | Qarib Qarib Singlle | |
| 34 | Raveena Tondon, Anu Malik and Altaf Raja | 11 November 2017 | | |
| 35 | Bipasha Basu and Karan Singh Grover | 12 November 2017 | | |
| 36 | Manish Paul, Rani Rampal, Savita Punia, Gurjeet Kaur, Monika Malik, Sushila Chanu and Deepika Thakur | 18 November 2017 | | |
| 37 | Mika Singh, Gurdeep Mehndi, Navraj Hans and Rahul Vaidya | 19 November 2017 | | |
| 38 | Jeetendra and Tusshar Kapoor | 26 November 2017 | | |
| 39 | Riteish Deshmukh and Farah Khan | 9 December 2017 | Friendship Special | |
| 40 | Riteish Deshmukh, Farah Khan and Amey Wagh | 10 December 2017 | Faster Fene | |
| 41 | Kunal Khemu and Soha Ali Khan | 17 December 2017 | | |
| 42 | Mika Singh, Dharmendra, Shrivardhan Trivedi, Hardy Sandhu, Nora Fatehi and Neil Nitin Mukesh | 7 January 2018 | New Year Special | |
| 43 | Akshay Kumar, Ali Zafar, Ila Arun, Neha Kakkar, Geeta Kapoor, Mithali Raj, Anny Divya, Anjana Kashyap, Manushi Chhillar and | 14 January 2018 | Padman | |
