= Sanket Bhosale =

Indian comedian, actor, doctor and television presenter

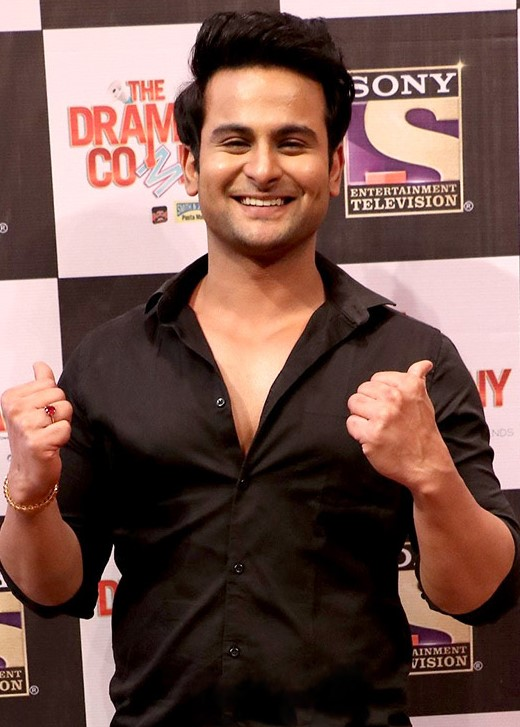
- Born: 9 May 1988 (age 38); Mumbai, Maharashtra, India
- Occupations: Physician, Comedian, Mimicry artist, Actor.
- Years active: 2012 – present
- Known for: Mimicry of Sanjay Dutt, Salman Khan, Ranbir Kapoor, Farhan Akhtar, Javed Akhtar, Kailash Kher, Nawazuddin Siddiqui, Sonu Nigam and others
- Spouse: Sugandha Mishra (m. 2021)
- Children: 1

Sanket Bhosale (born 9 May 1988) is an Indian comedian, actor, doctor and television presenter known for his work predominantly in Hindi television. He is known for mimicking the voices of many Bollywood celebrities, notably Salman Khan and Sanjay Dutt. Apart from his artistry, Bhosale is also a trained physician. He made his mimicry debut with the 2012 Laugh India Laugh, where he was among the top 10 finalists.

Born in a Marathi family, he was inspired to become a doctor after watching Sanjay Dutt in Munna Bhai M.B.B.S., and has been a vocal fan of the actor, whom he has popularly mimicked. He is married to fellow comedian, actress, singer and mimicry artist Sugandha Mishra.

== Television ==
Year	Title	Role	Notes
2016-2020	Baba Ki Chowki	Host	
2016-17	The Kapil Sharma Show	Baba	
2017	Super Night with Tubelight	Baba	
2017-18	The Drama Company	Baba	
2020	Gangs of Filmistan		
2021	Zee Comedy Show		
2022	Case Toh Banta Hai	Witness	Amazon miniTV series
2025–present	The Great Indian Kapil Show	Baba	Netflix series
2026	Taarak Mehta Ka Ooltah Chashmah	Sanket Gokhale	Guest appearance

== Mimicry ==
Actors that he highly mimicked include: Sanjay Dutt, Salman Khan, Ranbir Kapoor, Kailash Kher, Udit Narayan, Sonu Nigam, Ajay Devgn, Farhan Akhtar, Javed Akhtar, and Pankaj Tripathi.

Through his mimicry, he has also influenced and assisted Ranbir Kapoor to help capture the mannerisms of Sanjay Dutt for Rajkumar Hirani's 2018 biographical film Sanju, which is based on Dutt's personal life.
