= Hum Hain Khalnayak =

- Directed by: R. Thakur
- Starring: Arjun; Shakti Kapoor; Tiku Talsania
- Music by: Bappi Lahiri
- Release date: 1996
- Country: India
- Language: Hindi

Hum Hain Khalnayak is a 1996 Bollywood action drama film directed by R. Thakur, starring Arjun, Yunus Parvez, Shakti Kapoor and Tiku Talsania.

== Cast ==
- Arjun as Film Producer
- Shakti Kapoor as Tikka Sing
- Yunus Parvez
- Tiku Talsania as Subhashbhai
- Kishore Bhanushali
- Shehzad Khan
- Rajni Bala

== Soundtrack ==
No.	Title	Singer(s)
1	"Olaa Olaa"	Sudesh Bhosle, Rema Lahiri
2	"Pampum Pola"	Abhijeet
3	"Nazre Milake Tune Kya Kiya"	Kumar Sanu, Chandrani Mukherjee
4	"Mausam Haseen Hai"	Bappi Lahiri, Alka Yagnik
5	"Garam Garam Garma Garam"	Bappi Lahiri, Kavita Krishnamurthy
6	"Choli Purani" (I)	Sapan Chakraborty, Ila Arun, Alka Yagnik
7	"Choli Purani" (II)	Ila Arun, Alka Yagnik
