= Gangs of Filmistaan =

Indian Hindi stand-up comedy show

- Genre: Comedy
- Written by: Preeti Simoes; Neeti Simoes
- Starring: Sunil Grover; Shilpa Shinde; Sugandha Mishra; Sanket Bhosale; Paritosh Tripathi; Upasana Singh; Jatinder Suri; Siddharth Sagar; Devoleena Bhattacharjee
- Country of origin: India
- Original language: Hindi
- No. of seasons: 1
- No. of episodes: 45

Production
- Producers: Preeti Simoes; Neeti Simoes
- Running time: 22-24 Minutes
- Production company: Lil Frodo Productions house

Original release
- Network: Star Bharat
- Release: 31 August – 22 November 2020

Gangs of Filmistaan is a Hindi stand-up comedy show that is broadcast on Star Bharat and digitally available on Disney+ Hotstar. The show stars stand-up comedian Sunil Grover, Shilpa Shinde and other actors. This show is produced by Preeti Simoes and Neeti Simoes under banner of Lil Frodo Productions house.

== Premise ==
The show is based on Bhindi Bhai, who is a don. The don gave his house on rent. But instead of taking rent, he asks them to entertain him.

== Cast ==
- Sunil Grover as Bhindi Bhai, a don
- Shilpa Shinde
- Sugandha Mishra
- Sanket Bhosale
- Paritosh Tripathi
- Upasana Singh
- Jatinder Suri
- Siddharth Sagar
- Devoleena Bhattacharjee
- Mohammad Nazim
- Anup Jalota
- Shakti Kapoor

== See also ==
- List of programs broadcast by Star Bharat
