= Sugandha Mishra =

Indian playback singer, actress and comedian

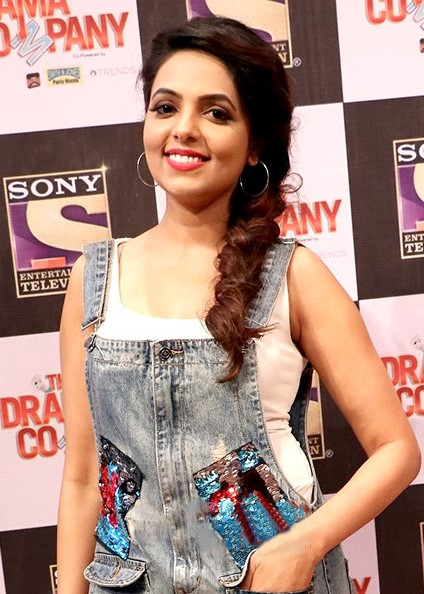
- Sugandha at the press conference of The Drama Company
- Born: 23 May 1988 (age 38); Jalandhar, Punjab, India
- Occupations: Actress; playback singer; television presenter; comedian; radio jockey
- Years active: 2008–present
- Spouse: Sanket Bhosale (m. 2021)
- Children: 1

Sugandha Santosh Mishra (born 23 May 1988) is an Indian actress, playback singer, television presenter, comedian and radio jockey in the Indian film and television industry. She is best known for her character in The Kapil Sharma Show. She was also noticed for her appearance in the TV reality show The Great Indian Laughter Challenge.

== Personal life ==
Sugandha Mishra was born on 23 May 1988, in Jalandhar, Punjab. Her parents are Santosh Mishra and Savita Mishra. She enrolled at Guru Nanak Dev University, Amritsar, Punjab and Apeejay College of Fine Arts, Jalandhar from where she completed her Master's in Music. Since childhood, she was inclined towards music as her family belongs to Indore Gharana. She is the fourth generation of her family into singing, she was classically trained by her grandfather Pt. Shankar Lal Mishra who was a disciple of Ustad Amir Khan Sahib. She has performed in the 149th Harivallabh Sangeet Sammelan 2023.

She married fellow comedian and co-star Sanket Bhosale on 26 April 2021. On 15 December 2023, she gave birth to their daughter Ihana.

== Career ==
Sugandha started her career as a radio jockey and worked with BIG FM India. After that, she started her singing career and sang many jingles, bhajans, and songs in many documentaries, plays, and short films. She also made her appearance in the famous TV reality show Sa Re Ga Ma Pa Singing Superstar as a participant and became third-runner up in the show. After that, she appeared in the TV comedy show The Great Indian Laughter Challenge as a participant and became one of the finalists in the show.

Apart from that she also gave her voice in Bollywood songs in the movies like Shree and Kamaal Dhamaal Malamaal. She also hosted many shows.

She made her acting debut on the big screen with the movie Heropanti in 2014 in a supporting role. She appeared on many TV shows like Dance Plus, IPL Extra Inning, Baal Veer, The Kapil Sharma Show, The Drama Company. She has performed in 133rd Harivallabh Sammelan in 2008, in which she gave a splendid performance with her Khayal singing, Thumri Tappa and bhajan.

== Filmography ==
Year	Title	Role	Notes
2014	Heropanti	Shalu	
2021	Rashna:The Ray of Light	Ayesha	Filmin

== Television shows ==
Year	Title	Role	Channel
2008	The Great Indian Laughter Challenge	Herself	Star One
2010	Sa Re Ga Ma Pa Singing Superstar	Herself	Zee TV
2011	Don't Worry Chachu	Bhawana C. Desai	SAB TV
2011	Comedy Circus Ke Taansen	Various Characters	Sony TV
2011	Chhote Miyan Bade Miyan		Colors
2012	Comedy Circus Ke Ajoobe		Sony TV
2012	Movers & Shakers		
2012	IPL Extra Innings		
2012	Family Antakshari		Zee TV
2013-2014	Baal Veer	Chhal Pari	SAB TV
2013-2014	Comedy Nights with Kapil	Various Characters	Colors TV
2013-2014	Tu Mere Agal Bagal Hai		
2016	The Kapil Sharma Show	Vidyavati (Teacher)	Sony TV
2016	The Voice India	Host	&TV
2016	Radio Mirchi Awards		Colors TV
2017	Super Night with Tubelight		Sony TV
2018	The Drama Company	Various Characters	Sony Entertainment Television
2018	Dance Plus	Sursuri Bhabhi co host Raghav Juyal	Star Plus
2018	Jio Dhan Dhana Dhan	Various Characters	Jio TV/Colors TV
2018	Kanpur Wale Khuranas	Pramod's sister-in-law	StarPlus
2020	Kuch Smiles Ho Jayein... With Alia	Herself	SAB TV
2020	Dance Plus 5	Sursuri Bhabhi guest host	Star Plus
2020	Gangs of Filmistan	Herself	Star Bharat
2020	Taare Zameen Par	Host	StarPlus
2021	Zee Comedy Show	Comedian	Zee TV
2021	Dance Plus	Sursuri Bhabhi guest host	Disney+ Hotstar
2022	Taarak Mehta Ka Ooltah Chashmah	Host	Sony SAB
2025	Wagle Ki Duniya – Nayi Peedhi Naye Kissey	Suman	Sony SAB

== Discography ==
Year	Song	Film	Notes
2012	Zor Naache	Kamaal Dhamaal Malamaal	Co-sung by Keerthy Sagathia
2012	Ishq Ki Dafli Baje	Kamaal Dhamaal Malamaal	Co-sung by Babul Supriyo and Bela Shende
2013	Tu Hass Le	Shree	
2015	Us Ladke Se Mohabbat Hai	Non-album single	
2016	Leading And Trending – Women's Day Special	Non-album single	
2018	Akhiyan	Non-album single	
2018	Chori Chori	Non-album single	
2018	Kinna Sohna	Non-album single	Duet with Anadi Mishra
2018	Challa	Non-album single	
2018	Loye Loye	Non-album single	
