= Jibraan Khan =

Indian actor (born 1993)

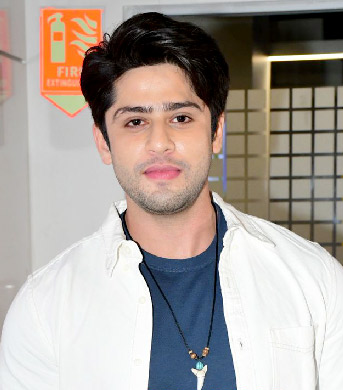
- Khan in 2024
- Born: 4 December 1993 (age 32); Mumbai, Maharashtra, India
- Occupation: Actor
- Years active: 1999–2002; 2024–present
- Parent: Firoz Khan (father)

Jibraan Khan (born 4 December 1993) is an Indian actor who primarily works in Hindi films. Born to actor Firoz Khan, he started his career as a child artist with films like Kabhi Khushi Kabhie Gham (2001) and Rishtey (2002). As an adult, Khan played a lead role in Ishq Vishk Rebound (2024).

== Early life ==
Khan was born on 4 December 1993, to actor Firoz Khan and his wife, Kashmira. He also has two sisters. Khan's father is known for his role as Arjuna in the television series Mahabharat (1988).

== Career ==
Khan started his acting career as a child artist with the 1999 film Bade Dilwala. He went onto appear as Govinda and Sushmita Sen's son Chintu in Kyo Kii... Main Jhuth Nahin Bolta (2001), Shah Rukh Khan and Kajol's son Krish in Kabhi Khushi Kabhie Gham (2001) and Anil Kapoor and Karisma Kapoor's son Karan in Rishtey (2002). Additionally, he also played Dhruva in the 2000 television series Vishnu Puran. In 2022, Khan worked as an assistant director in Brahmāstra: Part One – Shiva.

As an adult, Khan played the leading role in the 2024 film Ishq Vishk Rebound, a spiritual sequel to Ishq Vishk (2003). Khan portrayed Sahir, a college student opposite Pashmina Roshan. Bhavna Agarwal of India Today noted, "Jibraan Khan is charming on screen. Despite limited screentime, in moments of confrontation, he makes sure you take notice of his intense delivery style." While, Pratikshya Mishra of The Quint opined that Khan shows "potential" despite lack of nuance in performance.

== Filmography ==
=== Films ===
Key
†	Denotes films that have not yet been released

Year	Title	Role	Notes	Ref.
1999	Bade Dilwala	—N/a	Child artist	
2001	Kyo Kii... Main Jhuth Nahin Bolta	Chintu Malhotra	Child artist	
2001	Kabhi Khushi Kabhie Gham	Krish Raichand	Child artist	
2002	Rishtey	Karan Singh	Child artist	
2022	Brahmāstra: Part One – Shiva	—N/a	Assistant director	
2024	Ishq Vishk Rebound	Sahir Singh Rajput		

=== Television ===
Year	Title	Role	Notes	Ref.
2000	Vishnu Puran	Dhruva		

== Awards and nominations ==
Year	Award	Category	Work	Result	Ref.
2025	70th Filmfare Awards	Best Male Debut	Ishq Vishk Rebound	Nominated	
