= Ishq Vishk Rebound =

2024 Indian film by Nipun Dharmadhikari

- Theatrical release poster
- Directed by: Nipun Dharmadhikari
- Written by: Dr. Vinay Chhawal; Vaishali Naik; Ketan Pedgaonkar; Akarsh Khurana; Nipun Dharmadhikari
- Produced by: Ramesh Taurani; Jaya Taurani
- Starring: Rohit Saraf; Pashmina Roshan; Jibraan Khan; Naila Grrewal
- Cinematography: Milind Jog
- Edited by: Chandan Arora
- Music by: Songs: Rochak Kohli; Badshah; Hiten; Score: Ketan Sodha
- Production company: Tips Films
- Distributed by: Pen Marudhar Entertainment
- Release date: 21 June 2024
- Running time: 106 minutes
- Country: India
- Language: Hindi
- Box office: est. ₹6.13 crore

Ishq Vishk Rebound is a 2024 Indian Hindi-language romantic comedy-drama film directed by Nipun Dharmadhikari and produced by Ramesh Taurani and Jaya Taurani under Tips Films. A spiritual sequel to the 2003 film Ishq Vishk, it stars Rohit Saraf, Pashmina Roshan (in her acting debut), Jibraan Khan and Naila Grrewal.

Ishq Vishk Rebound was released in theatres on 21 June 2024 and received mixed reviews.

== Plot ==
The story follows Raghav Pandit, an aspiring screenwriter working for Tips Films, who is tasked with crafting a compelling romantic story. His boss pressures him to complete the script promptly, warning that failure to do so could jeopardize his position. Pressured by his boss to meet a looming deadline, he says that he is writing a film's story which draws inspiration from his own life. This premise sets the stage for Raghav to revisit the emotional journey he experienced over the past year with his closest friends.

The narrative then shifts to Raghav's hometown in Dehradun, where he shared a close bond with his childhood friends, Sanya and Sahir. The trio had been inseparable through their school years. As they transition into adulthood when they were in college, the dynamics among them evolve. Sanya and Sahir, once platonic companions, embarks on a romantic relationship. Raghav also enters into a relationship with Riya Mathur, a socially conscious college student and green activist.

Although Raghav is with Riya, much of his emotional energy is consumed by Sanya and Sahir's volatile relationship. Constantly caught between their fights, he acts as a mediator between them, often at the cost of his own romantic happiness. One day when Riya and Raghav began to kiss, he gets a call from Sanya informing him that she's breaking up with Sahir. Riya grows frustrated with Raghav's emotional unavailability and eventually breaks up with him, accusing him of being more invested in his friends than in their relationship.

Raghav goes to Sanya to offer to resolve her and Sahir's relationship, but Sanya explains that the relationship fell apart, driven by unresolved differences and pressure from Sahir's conservative family, and Raghav also can't reconcile these differences this time. Sahir returns all gifts given to him by Sanya through Raghav. Sanya also asks Raghav to bring him back the dog that she gifted to Sahir as a puppy when they were still in a relationship. Nevertheless, Raghav initially very reluctant, goes to Sahir's house due to her pestering and steals the dog, which is now a grown-up and gives it back to Sanya. Needless to say, the dog, having grown up with Sahir from its life as a puppy, runs right back to the family. In the meanwhile, Sanya accidentally and then spontaneously kisses Raghav, much to the confusion and anxiety of Raghav. Raghav believes this would distort their relationship as friends and his dynamic with Sahir.

The next day, Sanya calls Raghav, but he hesitates to pick up and talk, afraid of the repercussions this could have for Sahir, who he cannot fathom the thought of "betraying". Sahir calls Raghav to meet him the following day. Raghav is initially afraid Sahir may have learnt about his moment with Sanya, but is relieved when Sahir instead bars him from visiting his house again after having noticed he was involved in getting the dog out. Sahir gives him a ticket to a trip originally planned for him and Sanya. When Raghav goes to Sanya to return the ticket, she invites Raghav to the trip. During the journey, Raghav and Sanya grow closer, sharing their vulnerabilities and seeking solace in each other's company. Their bond culminates in a spontaneous kiss, marking the beginning of a rebound relationship. One night, the remote location where they were staying catches fire and the group, in order to save themselves, leaves, but mistakenly leaves Raghav alone there. When Raghav gets to know about this, he fears dying in the isolated environment and nervously sends a voice message to Riya saying that he still loves her. However, when Sanya realizes Raghav is left behind, she comes back to save him and eventually also proposes to him. Raghav, who had also started harboring feelings for Sanya during their vacation, accepts her proposal and they share a kiss.

After they came back from their trip, Sanya plans a special date with Raghav, but Sahir also comes to Sanya's house with Raghav, much to her disappointment. Sahir invites Sanya and his mother to his sister's wedding. Sanya nevertheless goes out with Raghav on their date, where they spend time together. While shopping for Sahir's sister's wedding, Sanya leaves briefly for an urgent task and asks Raghav to pay the bill, but when his card declines, Riya shows up, helping him pay his bill. From their conversation, Raghav gets to know that Riya still loves her as she was unable to move on from him. Sanya calls Raghav and asks him to tell the truth about their relationship to Sahir as he is their best friend. Raghav says that he'll surely tell Sahir everything at the danceball ceremony.

At the ceremony, Raghav still feels anxious about telling the truth to Sahir. Before Raghav can say anything, Sahir says that he still harbors feelings for Sanya. During the dance, Sahir eventually tries to kiss Sanya, and out of protest she pushes him away. She herself reveals the truth to Sahir about her and Raghav's relationship. Sahir becomes infuriated at Raghav for hiding the truth from him. Riya also confronts Raghav over the relevance of his earlier voice message. Raghav becomes furious after listening to the allegations levelled against him and confronts Sahir over getting trapped in the complexities of his relationship with Sanya, which took a toll on his relationship with Riya, something they did not even care for. After also confronting Riya for breaking up with him this way, Raghav decides to distance himself from everyone and moves to Mumbai to focus on a writing career.

Back in the present, Raghav throws himself into finishing the screenplay based on his tangled relationships. His boss insists the story must have a satisfying ending, warning that without it, the film will flop. He struggles with the ending, still unsure how to bring closure to either the story or his real-life emotions since all contact between him, Sanya, Sahir and Riya has had been broken. Confused, he decides to end the story with Raghav asking Riya for forgiveness admitting he still loves her. When he narrates this ending to his boss, she approves it and the film commences shooting.

One day, Sahir's sister calls Raghav and informs him about Sahir's accident. Hearing of this, Raghav immediately comes back to Dehradun to meet him, where he learns that Sahir has not met any accident, but he has been beaten up violently by his father, only because he couldn't fulfill his dream of joining the Indian Army. Raghav confronts Sahir's father about this, causing him to physically assault Raghav. Seeing this, an infuriated Sahir finally stands up to his father and prevents him from hitting Raghav any further. They leave, and Sahir apologizes to Raghav for everything, while also prompting him to reconnect with Sanya; when they visit her, she is emotionally unsettled by his sudden reappearance. She shuts the door on Raghav, who admits to being confused but now being clear that he only loves Sanya. Saying this, Raghav returns to Mumbai to work on the film shoot.

On the last day of shoot, Raghav receives a call from Sahir, who reveals he is now working at the café owned by Sanya's mother, having embraced a simpler, more grounded life. Raghav asks him about Sanya, to which he responds by saying she is out someplace. Assuming she doesn't want to talk to him and Sahir is covering up for her, he is startled when Sanya shows up, confessing she felt bad rejecting him. Seeing her, Raghav is overjoyed and finally reunites with his true love. As they are about to leave together, Sanya discovers that in the script of the film Raghav had written, he had concluded the story with his past relationship with Riya. Amused by this revelation, Sanya begins to laugh as the story ends.

== Cast ==
- Rohit Saraf as Raghav Pandit
- Pashmina Roshan as Sanya Malhotra
- Jibraan Khan as Sahir Singh Rajput
- Naila Grrewal as Riya Mathur
- Akarsh Khurana as Raghav's father
- Shilpa Vishal Shetty as Raghav's mother
- Supriya Pilgaonkar as Sanya's mother
- Shataf Figar as Sahir's father
- Anita Kulkarni as Sahir's mother
- Kusha Kapila as a film producer
- Adhaar Khurana as a film director
- Jaanam Raaj as Priya
- Sheeba Chaddha in a cameo appearance

== Production ==
Rohit Saraf, Pashmina Roshan, Jibraan Khan and Naila Grrewal were cast as the leads. The film marks Khan and Roshan's screen debut. The principal photography commenced in June 2022 and wrapped first schedule in July 2022. The film was mostly shot on location in Mumbai and Dehradun.

== Music ==
Ishq Vishk Rebound

Soundtrack album by Rochak Kohli, Badshah and Hiten
- Released: 22 June 2024
- Recorded: 2022–23
- Genre: Feature film soundtrack
- Length: 26:30
- Language: Hindi
- Label: Tips Music

The music of the film is composed by Rochak Kohli, Badshah and Hiten. Lyrics are written by Gurpreet Saini, Kumaar, Gautam G Sharma and Badshah.

The first single, "Ishq Vishk Pyaar Vyaar", was recreated from an alternate title track to the 2003 prequel, which was originally sung by Sonu Nigam. The second single, "Chot Dil Pe Lagi", which was sung by Alisha Chinai and Kumar Sanu, was also recreated from the 2003 prequel. Both songs were written by Sameer and composed by Anu Malik. The fourth single, "Gore Gore Mukhde Pe", was a recreation of the original song sung by Udit Narayan and Alka Yagnik, written by Sameer and composed by Anand-Milind, which was part of the soundtrack to the 1994 film Suhaag.

Track listing
No.	Title	Lyrics	Music	Singer(s)	Length
1.	"Ishq Vishk Pyaar Vyaar"	Gurpreet Saini	Rochak Kohli	Sonu Nigam, Nikhita Gandhi, Mellow D	3:21
2.	"Soni Soni"	Gurpreet Saini	Rochak Kohli	Darshan Raval, Jonita Gandhi, Rochak Kohli	2:56
3.	"Chot Dil Pe Lagi"	Gurpreet Saini	Rochak Kohli	Asees Kaur, Varun Jain	4:45
4.	"Gore Gore Mukhde Pe"	Badshah	Badshah, Hiten	Udit Narayan, Badshah, Nikhita Gandhi	2:26
5.	"Rehmat"	Gurpreet Saini, Gautam G Sharma	Rochak Kohli	Jubin Nautiyal	2:59
6.	"Jaavi Na"	Kumaar	Rochak Kohli	Darshan Raval, Jasleen Royal	4:21
7.	"Rehmat" (Rebound)	Gurpreet Saini	Rochak Kohli	Rekha Bhardwaj, Rochak Kohli	2:56
8.	"Rehmat" (ALT)	Gurpreet Saini, Gautam G Sharma	Rochak Kohli	Rochak Kohli	2:46
Total length:					26:30

== Reception ==
On the review aggregator website Rotten Tomatoes, 25% of 8 critics' reviews are positive, with an average rating of 5.5/10.

A critic for Bollywood Hungama rated the film 2 stars out of 5 and wrote "Ishq Vishk Rebound has youthful appeal but it suffers due to a weak second half."

Devesh Sharma of Filmfare gave the film two and a half out of five stars and wrote, "Ishq Vishk Rebound starts off as being a frothy romantic comedy but then loses its fizz midway. Watch it if you have a yen for rom coms and have to catch every such outing…"

Bhavna Agarwal of India Today gave the film two and a half out of five stars and wrote, "The major problem with the film is not that it makes rebound seem 'frivolous'. But, it makes a half-hearted attempt or resorts to tokenism to entertain. It is funny and cheesy, yes! But all of this without a soul, feels like a wasted opportunity."

Saibal Chatterjee of NDTV gave the film two and a half out of five stars and wrote, "The best way to approach Ishq Vishk Rebound as a viewer is not to expect the world from it. At least parts of it might then pleasantly surprise you."

Pratikshya Mishra of The Quint wrote, "Ishq Vishk Rebound is not a horrible movie – it has some of its better moments. There are times when the dialogues get an unexpected laugh out of you even as they remind you how inconsistent the writing has been."

Mayur Sanap of Rediff.com rated 1.5/5 stars and notes "Ishq Vishk Rebound is a drab romance and dull comedy that even the intended teen audience might have a hard time keeping up with."

=== Box office ===
The film collected ₹1 crore on its first day with a weekend total of ₹3.40 crore with a lifetime collection of ₹6.02 crore only. The small box office collection is also attributed to the fact that the film was released in only around 700-800 theatres nationwide.
