= National Bingo Night (Indian game show) =

- Genre: Game Show
- Presented by: Abhishek Bachchan
- No. of seasons: 1
- No. of episodes: 13

Original release
- Network: Colors TV
- Release: 23 January – 3 April 2010

National Bingo Night is an Indian game show, based on the American game show of the same name, produced by Urban Brew Studios which schedule to premiere on Colors TV on 23 January 2010. The show is hosted by Indian actor Abhishek Bachchan. The first celebrity guest on the show was Amitabh Bachchan, the father of the show's host.

== Overview ==
National Bingo Night is marketed as an interactive experience for both the studio audience and viewers at home. Members of the studio audience attempted to win a game of bingo while competing against a solo studio contestant as well as live television audience.

=== Rules ===
In each episode, two fast-paced, rounds of BINGO are played. The contestant plays one of many in-studio games, which is driven by the game ball numbers (1–75). The nation can play alongside the studio contestant by crossing out the numbers on their own 'National Bingo Night' tickets.

Each Ticket is only applicable for the Game number specified on it. Every episode of the Game Show will have two games: a Yellow Ticket Game and a Green Ticket Game. The host announces the game number and colour of the ticket to be played on at the beginning of each Game. The home viewer has to circle the numbers announced by the host that are taken out of the dome, if they appear on their ticket. Viewers are instructed not to poke a hole in their tickets, or scratch out or strike-through the numbers. All the balls/numbers that are taken out will be displayed on the television screen from time to time during the game.

=== Marketing ===
National Bingo Night, had teaser campaign running in the form of Abhishek Aaram Classes where individuals could take a quiz of being lazy, sign a lazy petition earn a certificate for being lazy or the coined term being aarami. The show was first unveiled to viewers via a teaser campaign and witnessed the host, Abhishek Bachchan associated with 'Abhishek's Aaram Classes'.

== Guests appearance ==
Guest(s)	Date	Prize won	Notes
Amitabh Bachchan	23 January 2010	₹ 25,00,000	First guest
Vidya Balan; Arshad Warsi	30 January 2010		For the promotion of Ishqiya
Karan Johar; Shahrukh Khan	6 February 2010	Maruti Suzuki Sx4 Car ₹ 25,00,000	For the promotion of My Name Is Khan
Kirron Kher; Sonali Bendre	13 February 2010	Maruti Suzuki Sx4	
Deepika Padukone; Farhan Akhtar	27 February 2010	Maruti Suzuki Sx4 ₹ 25,00,000	For the promotion of Karthik Calling Karthik
Avinash Mukherjee as Jagdish; Avika Gor as Anandi	6 March 2010	Maruti Suzuki Sx4	In Balika Vadhu
Pravesh Rana; Vindu Dara Singh	13 March 2010	Maruti Suzuki Sx4	Bigg Boss 3 Contestant
Ritesh Deshmukh; Jacqueline Fernandez	3 April 2010	₹ 1,00,000	For the promotion of Jaane Kahan Se Aayi Hai
