= Kanpur Wale Khuranas =

Indian television comedy show

- Genre: Sketch comedy Chat show
- Presented by: Aparshakti Khurana
- Starring: Sunil Grover; Ali Asgar; Sugandha Mishra; Upasana Singh; Adaa Khan; Aparshakti Khurana; Farah Khan; Shilpa Shinde; Antara Biswas; Karishma Tanna; Vivek Dahiya; Divyanka Tripathi; Hina Khan
- Country of origin: India
- Original language: Hindi
- No. of seasons: 1
- No. of episodes: 16

Production
- Producers: Preeti Simoes; Neeti Simoes
- Production locations: Mumbai, India

Original release
- Network: Star Plus
- Release: 15 December 2018 – 9 February 2019

Kanpur Wale Khuranas is an Indian Hindi comedy show that talks about the highlights of 2018. Celebrities who made news in the year will be seen interacting with the Khurana family. The show is broadcast on Star Plus. The show, premiered on 15 December 2018.

== Cast ==
- Sunil Grover as Pramod Kumar
- Adaa Khan as Mrs. Pramod Kumar
- Aparshakti Khurana as Host, Pramod's brother-in-law
- Jatinder Suri (actor) as Pramod's sister-in-law
- Ali Asgar as Pramod's sister-in-law
- Sugandha Mishra as Pramod's sister-in-law
- Upasana Singh as Pramod's sister-in-law
- Farah Khan as neighbour of Khuranas

== List of episodes ==
No.	Guest(s)	Date of Broadcast	Featured Promotion	Ref
1	Ranveer Singh & Rohit Shetty	15 December 2018	Simmba	
2	Ranveer Singh, Rohit Shetty, Sonu Sood & Siddhartha Jadhav	16 December 2018	Simmba	
3	Dharmendra & Badshah	22 December 2018	Guest Appearance	
4	Udit Narayan, Deepa Narayan & Aditya Narayan	23 December 2018	Guest Appearance	
5	Hina Khan, Karishma Tanna, Vivek Dahiya and Divyanka Tripathi	29 December 2018	Guest Appearance	
6	Kumar Sanu & Bappi Lahiri	30 December 2018	Guest Appearance	
7	Neha Kakkar, Tony Kakkar, Jassi Gill & Sonu Kakkar	1 January 2019	Guest Appearance	
8	Vicky Kaushal & Yami Gautam	2 January 2019	Uri: The Surgical Strike	
9	Rajkummar Rao	12 January 2019	Ek Ladki Ko Dekha Toh Aisa Laga	
10	Nawazuddin Siddiqui & Swara Bhaskar	13 January 2019	Guest Appearance	
11	Govinda & Shakti Kapoor	19 January 2019	Rangeela Raja	
12	Saina Nehwal & Parupalli Kashyap	20 January 2019	Guest Appearance	
13	Sushant Singh Rajput, Bhumi Pednekar & Manoj Bajpai	26 January 2019	Sonchiriya	
14	Kapil Dev	27 January 2019	Guest Appearance	
15	S. Sreesanth, Shilpa Shinde	3 February 2019	Guest Appearance	
16	Kartik Aaryan, Kriti Sanon and Pankaj Tripathi	9 February 2019	Luka Chuppi	
