= Sunil Grover =

Indian actor, comedian (born 1977)

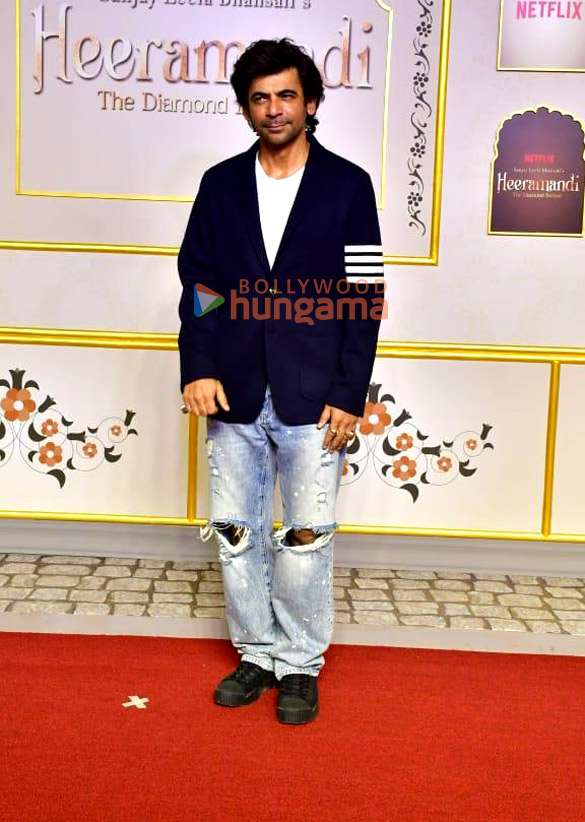
- Grover in 2024
- Born: 3 August 1977 (age 49); Mandi Dabwali, Haryana, India
- Occupations: Actor; comedian
- Years active: 1995–present
- Spouse: Aarti Grover
- Children: 1

Sunil Grover (born 3 August 1977) is an Indian actor and comedian who works in Hindi and Punjabi language films and television. He came into limelight for his portrayal as Gutthi on television show Comedy Nights with Kapil but gained popularity for playing the role of Dr. Mashoor Gulati, Rinku Devi and Pidu on The Kapil Sharma Show. Grover has appeared in several films such as Ghajini, Gabbar Is Back, Baaghi, The Legend of Bhagat Singh, Bharat and Jawan.

== Personal life ==
Grover was born on 3 August 1977 in Mandi Dabwali town of Sirsa district, Haryana. He received a Master's Degree in Theatre from Panjab University Chandigarh. He is married to Aarti and has a son. His brother Anil Grover is also an actor.

In February 2022, Grover suffered a heart attack, and had to undergo four bypass surgeries.

== Career ==
Grover was discovered during his college days by the late satirist and comedian Jaspal Bhatti. He has also acted in India's first silent comedy show, SAB TV's Gutur Gu in the initial 26 episodes.

During 2000s, he made his television debut with Chala Lallan Hero Banne on Filmy.

He gained a lot of popularity from the comedy shows Comedy Nights with Kapil and The Kapil Sharma Show, through which he became well known for his comical characters like Gutthi, Rinku Bhabi and Dr. Mashoor Gulati. He also mimics famous Bollywood actors like Amitabh Bachhan and many others in the show which were mostly liked by the viewers. But after having a fight with his co-actor Kapil Sharma, Sunil left the show.

Soon after leaving Kapil's show, Grover returned to television with Star Plus's show Kanpur Wale Khuranas with Aparshakti Khurana as the host. The plot of the show was similar to that of The Kapil Sharma Show, but it didn't last long and soon went off air.

In 2016, Grover debuted in the Punjab film industry with Vaisakhi List and in the same year, he portrayed Shraddha Kapoor's father in Baaghi.

He made a comeback in television industry in August 2020 with the show Gangs of Filmistan on Star Bharat where he played role of Bhindi Bhai. The show ended in October 2020.

In 2021, Grover portrayed Gurpal Chauhan in political drama web series Tandav, directed by Ali Abbas Zafar with an ensemble cast of Saif Ali Khan, Tigmanshu Dhulia, Kumud Mishra, Mohammed Zeeshan Ayyub, Gauahar Khan, Amyra Dastur, Kritika Kamra, Sarah Jane Dias and Sandhya Mridul, Anup Soni and Dino Morea. In the same year, he portrayed Sonu Singh in the thriller web-series Sunflower, for which he shed almost 8.1 kilos.

After a seven-year fallout, Grover reunited with his long-time co-star Kapil Sharma for The Great Indian Kapil Show, which started streaming on Netflix from 30 March 2024. His mimicry of Salman Khan, Aamir Khan, Kader Khan and Gulzar has received widespread praise.

== Filmography ==
Key
†	Denotes films that have not yet been released

=== Films ===
List of Sunil Grover film credits
Year	Title	Role
1998	Pyaar To Hona Hi Tha	Barber Totaram
1999	Mahaul Theek Hai	
2002	The Legend of Bhagat Singh	Jaidev Kapoor
2005	Insan	Mahesh
2006	Family: Ties of Blood	Aryan's Friend
2008	Ghajini	Sampat
2011	Mumbai Cutting	
2013	Zila Ghaziabad	Faqeera
2014	Heropanti	Driver Devpal
2015	Gabbar is Back	Constable Sadhuram
2016	Vaisakhi List	Tarsem Lal
2016	Baaghi	P. P. Khurana
2017	Coffee with D	Arnab Ghosh
2018	Pataakha	Dipper
2019	Bharat	Vilayti Khan
2022	Goodbye	Pandit Ji
2023	Jawan	Irani
2024	Blackout	Bewdiya/Asgar Don
2026	The Vvaan: Force of the Forrest	Deepak

=== Television ===
List of Sunil Grover television credits
Year	Title	Role	Notes
1995	Full Tension	Various characters	
2001	Professor Money Plant	Various characters	Punjabi Television series
2002	Ssshhhh...Koi Hai	Unnamed	
2005	Lo Kar Lo Baat	Himself	
2007	Kaun Banega Champu	Ruk Ruk Khan	
2008	Kya Aap Paanchvi Fail Champu Hain?	Ruk Ruk Khan	
2008	Chala Lallan Hero Ban ne	Lallan	
2010–2012	Gutur Gu	Balu Kumar	
2012	Comedy Circus	Various characters	
2013	Safar Filmy Comedy Ka	Host	
2013–2016	Comedy Nights with Kapil	Gutthi, Khairatilal, Kapil's father in law and Various characters	
2014	Mad In India	Chhutki	
2016–2017	The Kapil Sharma Show	Dr. Mashoor Gulati, Rinku Devi, Piddu and Various characters	
2017	Indian Idol 9	Dr. Mashoor Gulati/Rinku Devi	
2017	Sabse Bada Kalakar	Dr. Mashoor Gulati	Guest appearance
2017	Super Night with Tubelight	Dr. Mashoor Gulati, Bachchan Sahab and Various characters	Television special to promote Tubelight
2018	Super Night with Padman	Dr. Mashoor Gulati, Rinku Devi and Various characters	Television special to promote Padman
2018	Dus Ka Dum	Bachchan Sahab and Rinku Devi	Television special
2018	Jio Dhan Dhana Dhan	Professor Sahab	
2018–2019	Kanpur Wale Khuranas	Mr. Khurana	
2018	25th Star Screen Awards	Stree	Co-hosted the show with Ayushmann Khurana, Vicky Kaushal and Salman Khan
2019	Bigg Boss	Guest appearance	Along with Haarsh Limbachiyaa
2020	Gangs of Filmistan	Bhindi Bhai	
2021	Tandav	Gurpal Chauhan	
2021–2024	Sunflower	Sonu Singh	
2023	United Kacche	Tejinder "Tango" Gill	
2024–present	The Great Indian Kapil Show	Dhafli, Engineer Chumbak Mittal and various characters	
2025	Dabba Cartel	Chacko Kurian	

=== Radio ===
Title	Notes
Hansi Ke Phavare-1	Sud on Radio Mirchi

=== Songs ===
List of Sunil Grover song credits
Title	Role
"Daaru Peeke Girna"	Billa Sharabi
"Mere Husband Mujhko Piyar Nahin Karte"	Rinku Bhabhi

== Dubbing roles ==
=== Animated films ===
List of Sunil Grover dubbing roles in animated films
Film title	Original voice	Character	Dub Language	Original Language	Original Year Release	Dub Year Release	Notes
Chicken Little	Adam West	Ace – Hollywood Chicken Little	Hindi	English	2005	2015	

== Awards ==
List of Sunil Grover awards
Year	Category	Film/Role	Result
2018	ITA Award For Special Mention Comic Icon	Mimicry of Amitabh Bachchan	Won
