= Khichdi (franchise) =

Media franchise

Khichdi franchise
- Created by: Hats Off Productions
- Original work: Khichdi

Films and television
- Film(s): Khichdi: The Movie (2010); Khichdi 2: Mission Paanthukistan (2023)
- Television series: Khichdi; Instant Khichdi; Khichdi Returns

Miscellaneous
- Years: 2002–present
- Developed by: Aatish Kapadia; Jamnadas Majethia
- Directed by: Aatish Kapadia; Deven Bhojani
- Main cast: Supriya Pathak; Rajeev Mehta; Anang Desai; Vandana Pathak; Jamnadas Majethia

The Khichdi franchise is a Hindi language franchise of television series and films created by Hats Off Productions and UTV Software Communications, written and directed by Aatish Kapadia. It is one of the earliest franchises on Indian Television to adopt the western model of appearing in seasons and also the first Indian television series to be adapted into a Bollywood film series.

The franchise began as a weekly sitcom, debuting its first season on 10 September 2002 on Star Plus. The principal cast, consisting of actors Supriya Pathak, Rajeev Mehta, Anang Desai, and Vandana Pathak, was joined by Jamnadas Majethia who also served as a co-producer of the series alongside Kapadia. It was succeeded by a direct continuation called Instant Khichdi that aired on Star Plus's sister channel, Star One.

In 2010, the franchise was rebooted and adapted into a full-length feature film titled Khichdi: The Movie, with most of the main cast reprising their roles from the television series. 8 years later, the franchise returned with a third season (another soft reboot with the same main cast) as a prime-time weekend show on Star Plus and then on streaming platform Hotstar. A direct sequel to the first film, titled Khichdi 2: Mission Paanthukistan, released in 2023.

Over the years, the franchise has seen several re-airings on Star Plus and its affiliated channels like Pogo, Star Utsav, Star Bharat etc and has garnered a cult following.

== Development ==
After establishing their company "Hats Off Productions" to produce plays, Jamnadas Majethia and Aatish Kapadia engaged in various projects, including their collaborations for serials like Ek Mahal Ho Sapno Ka with Vipul Shah and Babul Ki Duwayen Leti Jaa with Shobhana Desai. As they transitioned from theatre to television, they recognized a void in the television landscape at that time with dearth of comedy-centric content. Aiming to fill this gap, they approached Star Plus with their proposal for a new show, inspired by the storyline of their first Gujarati Play from Hats Off Productions which was titled Ladakvaya, that led to the creation of Khichdi.

== Format ==
The first two seasons on television primarily followed an episodic format, with most plots resolving within one or two episodes. Occasionally, the show delved into subplots that spanned a few episodes and sometimes employeed flashbacks to advance the narrative. The initial episodes of the first season portrayed the trials and tribulations of a joint family and often touched an emotional cord. Subsequently, particularly in the second season, the focus shifted towards situational comedy as the characters started fitting themselves into their eccentricities.

Several new characters are introduced during the course of the television series, enriching the ensemble. With the film adaptation in 2010, the franchise took a new direction and dropped-off most of the recurring characters from the television series, focusing mainly on the principal ones.

== Television series ==
=== Khichdi (2002–2004) ===
The series introduces the Parekhs as an eccentric Gujarati joint family living in an old mansion in Mumbai.

The first season focuses on the idiosyncratic members of the family, led by the elderly Tulsidas Parekh who does not permit his family members to sell off their house and separate into nuclear families. Later, the Parekhs move into a much larger house left behind by a deceased aunt of Tulsidas. In the last episode, Parekhs become overnight millionaires when they discover oil in their older property.

=== Instant Khichdi (2004–2005) ===
The second season focused on the Parekhs as they try to settle themselves into higher society with their new-found wealth (in the first season). They live on in their own eccentric way, trying to ace the lives of the super-rich.

=== Khichdi Returns (2018) ===
The third season presents a rebooted story-line, as Parekhs gets stuck after the builder escapes in between the construction of their apartment and some people threaten them to kill until they do not return the money taken in exchange of apartments.

== Films ==
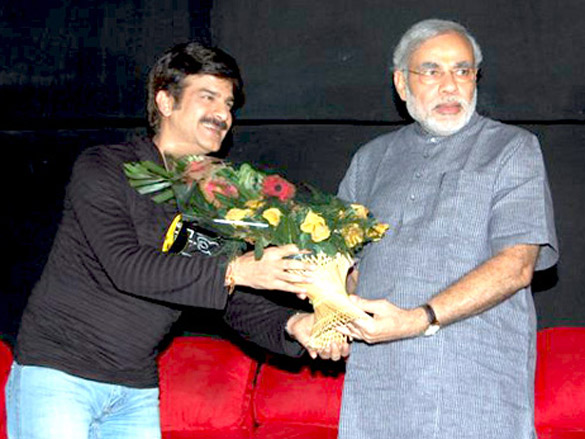
Jamnadas Majethia with Narendra Modi, at the screening of Khichdi: The Movie in 2010.

=== Khichdi: The Movie (2010) ===
A film based on the series, titled Khichdi: The Movie, was released on 1 October 2010 starring most of the same principal cast. In the film, Parekhs deal with the murder mystery of their neighbor Chakku Singh.

=== Khichdi 2: Mission Paanthukistan (2023) ===
In the sequel, the Parekhs are sent on a covert operation to a country called "Paanthukistan" to abduct the tyrannical king and free an Indian nuclear scientist held captive to construct a weapon of mass destruction.

== Crossovers ==
- In 2005, the series had a crossover with Sarabhai vs Sarabhai, where Himanshu and Hansa are revealed as distant cousins of Maya Sarabhai. The crossover is titled as Khichdi with Sarabhai, with Part 1 and Part 2 serving as the 25th episodes of Sarabhai vs Sarabhai and Instant Khichdi, respectively.
- In 2010, the cast of Khichdi: The Movie made a special appearance in SAB TV's sitcom Taarak Mehta Ka Ooltah Chashmah to promote their film.

== Cast and characters ==
Character	TV series			Films	
Character	Khichdi (2002–2004)	Instant Khichdi (2004–2005)	Khichdi Returns (2018)	Khichdi: The Movie (2010)	Khichdi 2: Mission Paanthukistan (2023)
Main
Hansa Parekh	Supriya Pathak	Supriya Pathak	Supriya Pathak	Supriya Pathak	Supriya Pathak
Praful Parekh	Rajeev Mehta (Note: Rajeev Mehta also portrays the character of Tulsidas's deceased wife, Damyanti Parekh, occasionally in the series.)	Rajeev Mehta	Rajeev Mehta	Rajeev Mehta	Rajeev Mehta
Tulsidas Parekh ("Babuji")	Anang Desai	Anang Desai	Anang Desai	Anang Desai	Anang Desai
Jayshree Parekh	Vandana Pathak	Vandana Pathak	Vandana Pathak	Nimisha Vakharia (Note: Nimisha Vakharia replaced Vandana Pathak in the 2010 film due to Pathak's unavailability. Vakharia had earlier appeared in a guest role in season one.)	Vandana Pathak
Himanshu Seth (Note: Himanshu's character is introduced midway through the first season and later becomes one of the main characters in the franchise.)	Jamnadas Majethia	Jamnadas Majethia	Jamnadas Majethia	Jamnadas Majethia	Jamnadas Majethia
Parminder Singh-Seth (Note: Parminder's character appears intermittently in the franchise as Himanshu's love interest or wife, occasionally taking on a more prominent role, especially noticeable in the films.)	Anokhi Srivastava	Anokhi Srivastava	Sameksha Singh	Kirti Kulhari	Kirti Kulhari
Recurring
Chakki Parekh	Richa Bhadra	Richa Bhadra	Mishri Majethia	Kesar Majethia	Shivika Rishi
Jacky Parekh	Yash Mittal	Yash Mittal	Agastya Kapadia	Markand Soni	Arisht Jain
Dheeman and various characters	Deepesh Shah	Deepesh Shah	Deepesh Shah		
Tiwariben Parekh ("Badi Ma")	Dina Pathak / Lily Patel	Lily Patel			
Mira Parekh	Ami Trivedi	Ami Trivedi (archived footage)			
Raju Parekh	Amit Varma	Amit Varma			
Melissa Parekh	Tina Parekh	Tina Parekh			
Bhavesh Kumar	Kamlesh Oza	Kamlesh Oza			
Heera Parekh	Arya Rawal	Arya Rawal			
Madhuri	Sweety Nayak	Sweety Nayak			
Mr. Mehta	Dinyar Contractor	Dinyar Contractor		Dinyar Contractor (Note: Dinyar Contractor appears in a brief role in the 2010 film as the Courtroom Judge.)	
Rekha Teacher	Vipra Rawal				
Saguna	Naini Shah		Falguni Rajani		
Jayantilal / Chandrakant Seth	Arvind Vaidya		Arvind Vaidya	Arvind Vaidya	
Hemlata Seth	Rita Bhaduri				
Jagdamba Maami	Kalpana Diwan	Kalpana Diwan (photo, archived footage)			
Parminder Singh	Gireesh Sahedev	Gireesh Sahedev	Balvinder Singh Suri	Gireesh Sahedev	
Bhabhi Parminder	Seema Pandey		Anuradha Verma	Ruby	
Bhai Parminder	Daman Baggan			Nitin Handa	Nitin Handa
Jignesh and various characters	Aatish Kapadia	Aatish Kapadia	Aatish Kapadia	Aatish Kapadia	
Rambha	Kishwar Merchant	Kishwar Merchant			
Sadhvi Sandhya Devi		Smita Singh			
Savitri		Aanchal Dwiwedi			
Peter D'Souza			Bakhtiyaar Irani		
Mrs. D'Souza			Melissa Pais		
Tony			Farhad Shahnawaz		
Advocate and various characters			Paresh Ganatra	Paresh Ganatra	Paresh Ganatra
Farah Khan				Farah Khan (Note: Bollywood filmmaker and choreographer Farah Khan plays a fictional version of herself in the film series.)	Farah Khan
Kushal					Anant Vidhaat Sharma

== Reception ==
"The essence of comedy is to surprise people with as many unusual things as possible & make their eyes go wide in amazement."

— Jamnadas Majethia in 2004, on the success of the first season.

The first season consistently ranked among the top family-oriented shows on Star Plus till its last episode in July 2004.

The 2010 film initially performed below expectations at the Box Office and was declared "Below Average" but it ultimately recovered its costs and yielded decent profits. The sequel, released in 2023, received mixed critical response.

== Awards and nominations ==
=== Khichdi ===
==== Indian Television Academy Awards ====
Winner

- 2004: Best Actress-Comedy – Supriya Pathak as Hansa

==== Indian Telly Awards ====
Winner

- 2003: TV Actor in a Comic Role (Female) – Supriya Pathak as Hansa
- 2004: BEST Actor in a Comic Role (Male) – Rajeev Mehta as Praful
- 2004: Sitcom Writer of the Year – Aatish Kapadia

Nominated

- 2003: TV Child Artiste of the Year – Yash Mittal as Jacky
- 2004: The TV Sitcom / Comedy programme of the Year
- 2004: Lyricist of the Year – Aatish Kapadia
- 2004: Music Director of the Year – Uttank Vora
- 2004: Director of the Year (Sitcom) – Aatish Kapadia
- 2004: Child Artiste of the Year (Female) – Richa Bhadra as Chakki
- 2004: Child Artiste of the Year (Male) – Yash Mittal as Jacky
- 2004: Actor in a Comic Role (Male) – Rajeev Mehta as Praful
- 2004: Actor in a Comic Role (Male) – Anang Desai as Tulsidas Parekh
- 2004: Actor in a Comic Role (Female) – Supriya Pathak as Hansa
- 2004: Actor in a Comic Role (Female) – Vandana Pathak as Jayshree
- 2004: Ensemble (complete star cast of a programme)
- 2004: The Weekly Serial of the year
- 2004: Scriptwriter of the year – Aatish Kapadia

=== Instant Khichdi ===
==== Indian Telly Awards ====
Winner

- 2005: Best Actor in a Comic Role ( Female ) – Supriya Pathak as Hansa
- 2005: Best Child Artiste (Male) – Yash Mittal as Jacky

Nominated

- 2005: Best Sitcom / Comedy Writer – Aatish Kapadia
- 2005: Best Actor in a Comic Role (Female) – Vandana Pathak as Jayshree
- 2005: Best Actor in Comic Role (Male) – Rajeev Mehta as Praful
- 2005: Best Sitcom/Comedy Programme

=== Khichdi: The Movie ===
6th Apsara Film & Television Producers Guild Awards

- Nominated:
  Apsara Award for Best Performance in a Comic Role – Jamnadas Majethia

2011 Zee Cine Awards

- Nominated:
  Zee Cine Award for Best Performance in a Comic Role – Jamnadas Majethia

2011 Filmfare Awards

- Nominated
  Best Actress in a Supporting Role — Supriya Pathak
