= Khichdi (disambiguation) =

Khichdi, or Khichri, is a South Asian rice and lentil dish.

Khichdi may also refer to:

- Khichdi (franchise), Hindi language franchise of sitcoms and film
  - Khichdi (2002 TV series), 2002 Indian TV series
  - Khichdi: The Movie, 2010 Bollywood comedy film
  - Khichdi (2018 TV series), 2018 Indian TV series
  - Khichdi 2: Mission Paanthukistan, 2023 sequel to the 2010 film

== See also ==
- Kichadi, a Sadhya meal served for Onam
- Khichra, a variation of the dish haleem
- Kedgeree, Anglo-Indian fish and rice dish derived from khichdi
