= Vandana Pathak =

Indian actress

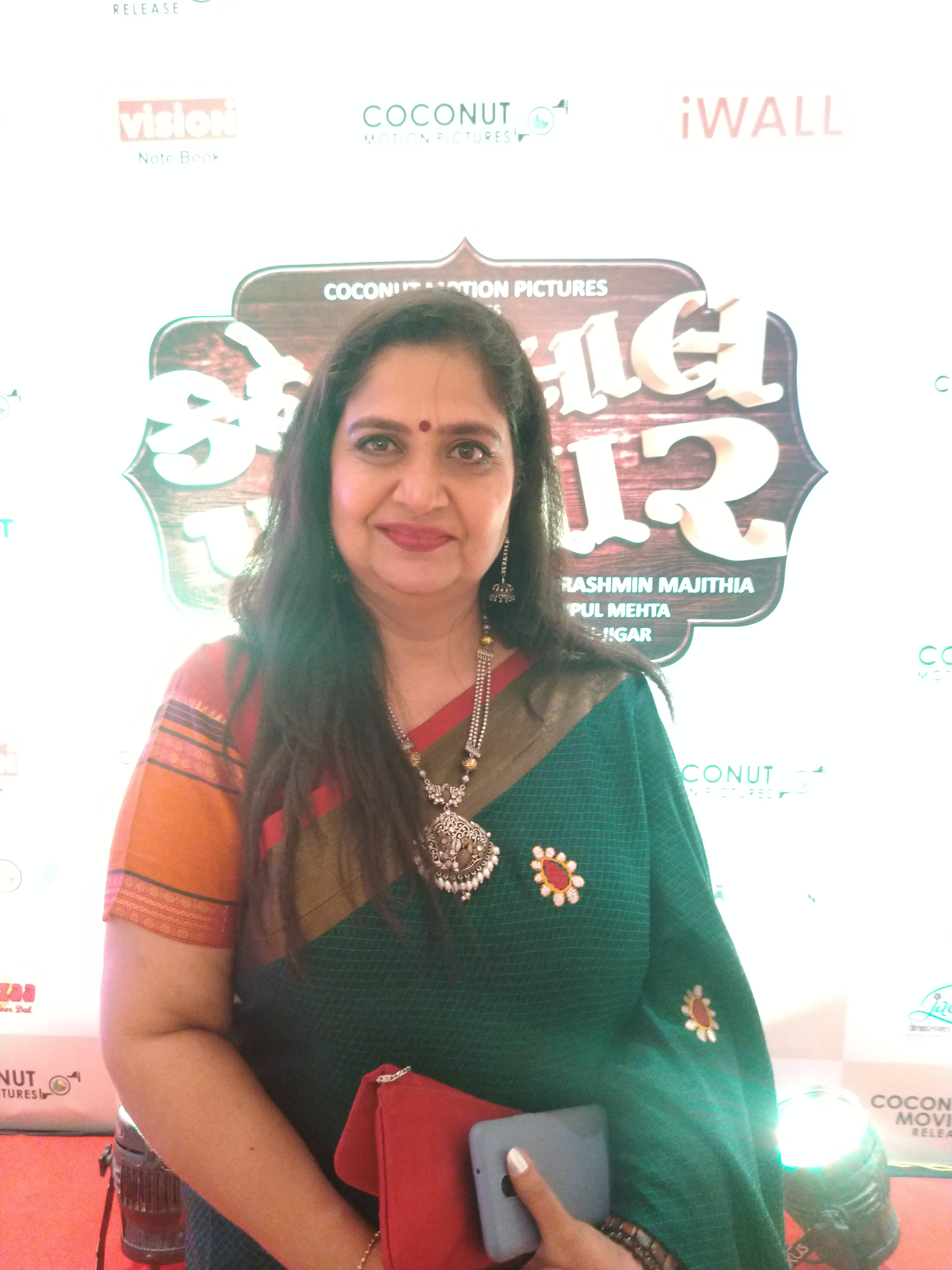
- Vandana Pathak at premiere of Kehvatlal Parivar (2022)
- Born: Vandana Vaidya; Ahmedabad, Gujarat, India
- Occupation: Actress
- Years active: 1995–present
- Notable work: Hum Paanch as Meenakshi Mathur; Khichdi as Jayashree Parekh; Saath Nibhaana Saathiya as Gaura Suryavanshi
- Spouse: Neeraj Pathak (m. 1992)
- Children: 2
- Father: Arvind Vaidya

Vandana Pathak is an Indian actress who appears in Hindi films, stage and television. She is known for her role as Jayshree Parekh in the Khichdi franchise; as well as her antagonistic role as Gaura in the soap opera Saath Nibhaana Saathiya. She has played many Gujarati roles in Indian serials. In a career spanning more than two decades, she has most of her memorable work in comedy plays and sitcoms.

Born in Maharashtrian family and brought up in Ahmedabad, she is the daughter of Gujarati actor Arvind Vaidya. Making her television debut in 1995, she gained notice due to her performance as Meenakshi Mathur in the sitcom Hum Paanch.

== Career ==
She started her career with Hum Paanch in 1995. She also acted in Gujarati plays. After the success of Hum Paanch, Pathak was chosen to star in another sitcom called Khichdi, playing the role of Jayashree Parekh. In 2005, she reprised the same character in its sequel, Instant Khichdi which was equally successful as its predecessor. However, she was replaced by actress Nimisha Vakharia in the film adaptation of the series, which was released in 2010.

She portrayed the twisted character of Sheela Devi in SAB TV's light-comedy show Main Kab Saas Banoongi.

In 2011, she had a starring role in another comedy show, R. K. Laxman Ki Duniya. She also starred in Mahisagar.

She played the role of an alien in television series Badi Door Se Aaye Hai. She said that she took inspiration from her father for the character.

In 2015, she entered Star Plus's longest-running popular show Saath Nibhaana Saathiya. Pathak said that she "had been doing comedy for the last 14 years" and "was on the lookout for more serious roles when Gaura of Saathiya came her way.". She took a break from the show in May 2016; but returned to the series in October 2016. The show went off-air in July 2017.

In 2017, she was cast as the villainous character of Padmini (also called Vaidehi) in Colors TV's medical drama show Savitri Devi College & Hospital.

== Personal life ==
Pathak was brought up in Ahmedabad, where her father, Arvind Vaidya was involved in Gujarati theatre, Gujarati and Hindi films and television series. She is married to writer-director Neeraj Pathak who has made films like Apne, Gumnaam (2008) and Right Yaaa Wrong (2010). The couple has two children: son Yash and daughter Radhika.

In 2016, she fell down the stairs and injured herself on the sets of her show Saath Nibhaana Saathiya.

== Television series ==
- Hum Paanch as Meenakshi Mathur (1995–1996, 2005–2006)
- Ek Mahal Ho Sapno Ka (1999–2002)
- Khichdi as Jayshree Parekh (2002–2004)
- Ye Meri Life Hai as Rasik's wife, Pooja's mother (2004–2005)
- Instant Khichdi as Jayshree Parekh (2005)
- Main Kab Saas Banoongi as Sheela Devi (2008–2009)
- Mrs. & Mr. Sharma Allahabadwale as Rajshri Shah (2010–2011)
- R K Laxman Ki Duniya as Bakula "Baku" Bhavesh Vasavda (2011–2013)
- Mahisagar as Anusuya Mehta (2014–2015)
- Badi Door Se Aaye Hai as Daadi "90" (2014–2015)
- Saath Nibhaana Saathiya as Gaura Suryavanshi (2015–2016; 2016–2017)
- Savitri Devi College & Hospital as Padmini/Vaidehi (2017–2018)
- Khichdi Returns as Jayshree Parekh (2018)
- Manmohini as Devki Dai (2018–2019)
- Tumm Se Tumm Tak as Gayatri Devi (2025–present)

== Filmography ==
- Golkeri (2020, Gujarati)
- Swagatam (2021, Gujarati)
- Kehvatlal Parivar (2022, Gujarati)
- Nava Pappa (2023, Gujarati)
- Bushirt T-shirt (2023, Gujarati)
- Gulaam Chor (2023, Gujarati)
- Khichdi 2: Mission Paanthukistan (2023, Hindi)
- Vanilla Ice Cream (2024, Gujarati)
- Umbarro (2025, Gujarati)
- All The Best Pandya (2025, Gujarati)
- Jai Mata Ji - Let's Rock (2025, Gujarati)
- Jalebi Rocks (2025, Gujarati)
- Aachari Baa (2025, Hindi)
