= Baa Bahoo Aur Baby =

Indian television series

- Genre: Comedy drama
- Written by: Aatish Kapadia
- Directed by: Sameer Kulkarni; Dipesh Shah; Amitava Bhattacharya
- Creative director: Deven Bhojani
- Starring: Sarita Joshi; Shakti Arora; Arvind Vaidya; Benaf Dadachandji; Lubna Salim; Paresh Ganatra; Vaishali Thakkar; Gautam Rode
- Opening theme: "Baa Bahoo Aur Baby" by Vinod Rathod and Madhushree
- Country of origin: India
- Original language: Hindi
- No. of seasons: 2
- No. of episodes: 559

Production
- Producers: Jamnadas Majethia; Aatish Kapadia
- Cinematography: Vijay Soni; Raju Desai
- Camera setup: Multi-camera
- Running time: 20-40 minutes
- Production company: Hats Off Productions

Original release
- Network: StarPlus
- Release: 5 August 2005 – 22 February 2010

Baa Bahoo Aur Baby (colloquially known as BBB or B3; transl. Mom, daughter-in-law and Baby) is an Indian television dramedy series that aired in prime time on StarPlus between 2005 and 2010 with a total of two seasons. The series was produced by Hats Off Productions and centered around a fictitious Gujarati Thakkar family living in Parla East, Mumbai.

After the end of the first season, the second season was brought in August 2009. However, it was not well received and went off the air on 22 February 2010.

== Series overview ==
Season	Episodes	Originally broadcast (India)	
Season	Episodes	First aired	Last aired
1	511	5 August 2005	5 April 2009
2	48	23 August 2009	22 February 2010

== Plot ==
=== Season 1 ===
The season begins with a detailed introduction of all the household members and how they deal with all the issues impacting a joint family structure. They face different problems and misunderstandings. Notable episodic stories of this season are: Family unable to find a groom for Radhika due to her polio; Radhika's unrequited love for Anish; an NRI; Anish and Dimple's love story; Arvind not talking to his father, Labhshankar due to his drinking habit that has caused severe issues to the family from childhood till date; Harshad being turned out of the house by Godavari and his return after 5 years; Soumil's brain tumour; Praveena's tragic demise; Radhika and Birju's love story; Meenakshi's complicated pregnancy; Hemal and Gurinder's wedding; Gattu getting lost during a family trip and becoming a waiter; the calamity of Praveen selling the house without everyone's consent to save Hemal's life by helping him to return the money taken as loan; and Jigar's coming of age. The inner turmoil of a matriarch leading a 20+ members family is beautifully represented.

=== Season 2 ===
The sons get Krishna villa renovated. The season focuses on the relationship of Radhika - Birju, and Jigar - Rimjhim. Reluctance from the family of Birju to accept Radhika as their daughter-in-law creates initial hiccups, but they get married eventually. Rimjhim is the daughter of a wealthy businessman, and the Thakkar family helps her to elope from a forced arranged marriage as she and Jigar love each other. While Rimjhim and Jigar try to prove themselves worthy, Rekha enters the household as the unwed mother of a newborn whom she hands over to Gattu for care-giving. Gopal grows attached to the newborn girl.

In the last episode of the season; Godavari's biography, Sanyukt Parivaar Ki Safal Yatra: Baa, Bahoo Aur Baby, gets officially published.

==== Three Years Later ====
Leela and Arvind are about to go to United States as Dimple is pregnant. Praveen's children are all grown up and pursuing their careers. Harshad and Shilpa open a maternity home in Godavari's name. Meenakshi is expecting her third child. Gudiya has had twin daughters. A breakthrough in polio treatment has helped Baby to recover from her polio. Birju and Radhika have a son named Aahan. Rimjhim has started a family catering business known as 'Thakkar Caterers'. Labhshankar has finally stopped drinking and is helping Rimjhim in business partnership by handling the accounts and deliveries of the catering service. And Gattu is taking care of babies in his playhouse which is built on the name of his foster daughter- 'Gatuki Palna Ghar' as he still misses Rekha and Gatuki. The season ends with the Thakkar family winning the 'Family of the Decade' award and all the family members are taking a family picture together.

The third season is yet to be released.....

== Cast ==
=== Main ===
- Sarita Joshi as Godavari Labh Shankar Thakkar a.k.a. Baa: She is the matriarch of the Thakkar family. She is a strict, stubborn, loving and caring woman. She has six sons (Hemal is adopted) and two daughters. Her husband Labh Shankar used to spend money in alcohol leading to poverty for family members, leading to strained relationship between them. She used to run Tiffin service to manage the household expenses and educate her children. If someone disobeys her or interrupts in her conversation, she says- 'Koi behes nahi karega, jo behes karega vo sidha ghar se bahar jayega.' To that, her son Gopal always replies 'Aise... aise karke....' (while showing actions through his hand). She also has a catchphrase- "Kuch nahi sikhaya maa-baap ne, bas bhej diya!" She is secretly called Mogambaa, Jog Maya etc. by a few members of the family due to their frustration on her. Krishna Villa was given by her deceased father and sister-in-law Gunvanti to her family. (2005–2010)
- Arvind Vaidya as Labh Shankar Thakkar a.k.a. Bapuji: He is Godavari's husband, a jolly and fun loving man who loves his family, a theatre actor and the patriarch of the family, only for saying as he was an alcoholic man and used to spend his earnings in wrong habits due to which the family had to live in poverty. He frequently sings the famous song of the film Mughal-e-Azam 'Mohe panghat pe.... Nandlaal chedh gayo re....' He always teases Arvind to try and make Arvind talk to him, as Arvind never talks to him directly due to his habit of drinking. Gopal always calls his liquor 'Kaala khatta' as it smells very bad. (2005–2010)
- Benaf Dadachandji as Radhika Birju Mehta a.k.a. Baby: Radhika is Godavari and Labh Shankar's youngest child and younger daughter. She is handicapped (affected with polio). She is stubborn and lazy, yet everyone's favourite. She understands life and cares for all her family members. She had love for Anish but after knowing that Anish and her niece Dimple love each other, she happily accepted their relationship. Later, she fell in love with Birju and married him. and have a son, Ahaan. (2005–2010)
- Deven Bhojani as Gopal Labh Shankar Thakkar a.k.a. Gattu: He is Godavari and Labh Shankar's youngest (own) son. He is a foodie and an intellectually disabled child. He is also a great fan and admirer of actress Rani Mukherjee and always says that he wants to marry her after she finishes all her films' shootings. He is everyone's favourite in the family, mostly amongst his nephews and nieces. Gattu’s innocence and persistent childlike nature, which gets him into trouble, most of the time, is a matter of concern for Baa (2005–2010(
- Rajeev Mehta as Arvind Labh Shankar Thakkar a.k.a. Mota Bhai: He is Godavari and Labh Shankar's eldest son, Leela husband and father of Dimple and Jigar. He is an ill-tempered, strict and old-fashioned insurance agent. He mostly (even on special occasions like marriage) wears his checks-designed shirt. He always thinks about his brothers and sisters before himself. He obeys Baa at any point of time and say "Baa kabhi galat nahi hoti hai." Whenever he gets angry, he loudly says "Ha...". (2005–2010)
- Lubna Salim / Anjali Mukhi as Leela Arvind Thakkar: She is Priyavardhan Raichura's daughter, Arvind's wife and mother of Dimple and Jigar. She came from a rich family and always insists on having imported things in the house. She had two dreams - to go to U.S.A. and do acting in films. She is called Hema Malini of Thakkar family. She loves everyone in the family except but often fights with Charubala. (2005–2009) / (2009–2010)
- Paresh Ganatra as Praveen Labh Shankar Thakkar a.k.a. Labaad: Praveen is Godavari and Labh Shankar's second son. He is Praveena's widower and father of Mehul, Mitali and Chaitali. He is a stingy saree businessman. He has a love hate relationship with Baa and always try to make money. Though he loves Hemal, despite the latter being his adopted brother, he used to hate it when he earlier did not give money in the house. (2005–2010)
- Vaishali Thakkar as Praveena Thakkar a.k.a. Bhullakad: She was Shakuntala's daughter, Devki's sister, Praveen's wife and mother of Mehul, Mitali and Chaitali. She named Baa by many names like Jog Maya, Mogambaa in frustration. She had a habit of forgetting things and also used to bet with family members. She was a very strict mother and always got angry when her kids wreaked havoc in the house. She loved everyone in the family, but due to the love-hate relationship, with Charubala, she often fought with her. She died in the crash of a building. (2005–2008)
- Nimisha Vakharia as Charubala Bhayani a.k.a. Charr, Charu: She is Godavari and Labh Shankar's third child and elder daughter. She is married to Tushar, who she calls 'Tussshar...' and is mother of Simran and Khushi. She lives in Walkeshwar. She keeps comparing the lifestyle of people in town and of those in suburbs. She has a love hate relationship with Leela and Praveena. She often fights on petty issues and irritates everyone. (2005–2010)
- Nitin Vakharia as Tushar Bhayani: He is Malti's son, Charubala's husband and father of Simran and Khushi. He always cracks stupid and irritating jokes which only Charubala finds funny. Praveen secretly calls Tushar a hyena as Tushar always laughs like one. (2005–2010)
- Jamnadas Majethia as Dr. Harshad Labh Shankar Thakkar: He is Godavari and Labh Shankar's third son, Shilpa's husband and father of Soumil and Saloni. When he was a child, one of his school friends once taunted him that as his mother was a cook, she would make Harshad a cook too. Baa felt insulted and vowed to make Harshad a doctor. Harshad, to fulfill his mother's dream, worked hard and became a successful doctor. He is calm, patient, responsible and kind hearted. He can do anything for the betterment of the family members, even crossing the extra mile, which led to the family members being overdependent on him, which indirectly led to him and his family leaving Krishna Villa for five years, prior to returning. (2005–2010)
- Sonali Sachdeva as Dr. Shilpa Harshad Thakkar: She is Harshad's wife and a doctor. She is a loving, caring, calm, patient and responsible wife, daughter-in-law and mother. (2005–2010)
- Rajesh Kumar as Subodh Labh Shankar Thakkar: He is Godavari and Labh Shankar's fourth son, Meenakshi's husband and father of Manav and Disha. He is an actor. He is a calm, patient and responsible man. (2005–2010)
  - As the narrator in Season 2: Episode 48 (2010)
- Suchita Trivedi as Meenakshi Subodh Thakkar: She is Subodh's less educated, shy and slow wife and mother of Manav and Disha. Subodh fall in love with her at first sight. She is a big devotee of Lord Krishna. Whenever Subodh tries to have romance with her, she runs away as she is old-fashioned. She is from a poor family hailing from a small village near Kolkata what she often refers while talking. She always starts crying in small things. (2005–2010)
- Kamlesh Oza as Hemal Labh Shankar Thakkar a.k.a. Mafatlal: He is Godavari and Labh Shankar's youngest (adopted) son. Hemal is actually the nephew of Godavari's sister-in-law, Gunvanti. But Hemal's parents died when he was very young. Thus, Godavari adopted him and raised him like his own son. He first worked in a call center, but later joined a bank. Earlier, Praveen used to hate that he never gave money in house. He earlier liked many girls, but eventually met Gurinder, fell in love and married her to adopt her niece Lucky. He later became father to twin daughters. (2005–2010)
- Sweta Keswani as Gurinder Hemal Thakkar a.k.a. Gudiya: She is Hemal's Punjabi wife. She and Hemal fell in love with each other when they both met in bank. Later, Hemal secretly married her in the court to help Gurinder adopt her niece Lucky. When Godavari found about it, she decided to get Hemal and Gurinder married again as per the Hindu rituals in Mandap, along with Dimple's wedding. After marriage, Gurinder had a few problems adjusting in the house. But the Thakkars accepted her eventually. She has habit of clarifying words or names with two different meanings or persons whenever not needed. She later became mother to twin daughters. (2007–2010)
- Amit Varma as Birju Mehta: He is Sumitra's son, Janki's nephew and Radhika's husband. He is an artist. His father had died in a car accident when Birju was just a child. He used to imagine Radhika in his paintings even before meeting her. He fall in love with her at first sight. Later, they got married and have a son. (2008–2010)

=== Recurring ===
- Manva Naik as Dimple Anish Kotak: She is Arvind and Leela's daughter, Jigar's sister and Anish's wife. She is Radhika's niece and best friend. She is caring and kind hearted. (2005–2007)
- Gautam Rode as Anish Ashutosh Kotak: He is Revathi and Ashutosh's son, Aarya's brother and Dimple's husband. His father owns a beer company in U.S.A. and his parents got separated in his childhood. He is Radhika's best friend, whom she loved earlier. He loves Thakkar family a lot as after meeting them, he recovered from loneliness due to separation of his family. (2005–2007)
- Jay Soni / Shakti Arora as Jigar Arvind Thakkar: He is Arvind and Leela's son Dimple's younger brother and Rimjhim's husband. He is fun loving and handsome. He wanted to become an actor but pursued medical studies under pressure of his father. He fell in love with his college mate Rimjhim and married her after much conflict between their families. (2005–2008) / (2008–2010)
- Menaka Lalwani as Rimjhim Jigar Thakkar: She is Parshuram Talwar's daughter and Jigar's wife. She fall in love with her college mate Jigar and married after much conflicts between their families. (2009–2010)
- Devarsh Thakkar / Hardik Chandarana as Mehul Praveen Thakkar: He is Praveen and Praveena's son and brother of Mitali and Chaitali. He is mischievous to the core and often angers his parents, due to his naughtiness, and rebellious attitude. (2005–2008; 2009–2010) / (2008–2009)
  - Devarsh Thakkar retook his role as Mehul Thakkar from Season 1: Episode 504 till end of Season 2.
- Richa Bhadra as Mitali Praveen Thakkar: She is Praveen and Praveena's elder daughter and Mehul and Chaitali's sister. She is responsible and caring. (2005–2010)
- Swini Khara as Chaitali Thakkar: She is Praveen and Praveena's younger daughter and Mehul and Mitali's sister. She is intelligent, and mischievous. She is Krishna Villa's James Bond. She finds out everyone's secrets and later uses that information as blackmailing tool. (2005–2010)
- Khushi Dubey / Afia Tayeb Ali as Simran Tushar Bhayani: She is Charubala and Tushar's elder daughter and Khushi's sister. She, like her mother, keeps showing off and comparing the life of people in town and of those in suburbs. (2005–2008)
- Kartik Gantha as Soumil Harshad Thakkar: He is Harshad and Shilpa's son. He suffered from brain tumor. But with family's support and proper treatment, he recovered. He is caring and responsible like his father. (2005–2010)
- Devanshi Jhaveri / Juhi Rangparia as Saloni Thakkar: She is Harshad and Shilpa's daughter and Saumil's elder sister. She is caring and fun loving. (2005–2010)
- Smith Seth as Manav Subodh Thakkar: He is Subodh and Meenakshi's son, and Disha's elder brother. His cousins sometimes, but Gattu most of the time casually calls him 'Mansukhlal'. He is smart but often starts crying like his mother. (2005–2010)
- Navika Kotia as Lucky Hemal Thakkar: She is Gurinder's fun loving niece. After her mother (Gurinder's sister) died, Hemal and Gurinder adopted Lucky and raised her as their own daughter. (2008)
- Siddarth Jadhav as Rajja: Rajja is the Thakkars' cook. He is fond of acting and dancing, who earlier used to work in local drama group. He sometimes speaks Marathi. He and Arvind have a complicated relationship. (2006–2009)
- Honey Chhaya as Narsi: Narsi Kaka is the Thakkars' elderly worker, who Godavari considers like her brother as he raised her in childhood. He is strict and laughs only occasionally. He loves to watch T.V. serials and does not work after 10 pm. (2005–2009)

=== Episodic appearances ===
- Lily Patel as Moti Baa: She is Labh Shankar's mother and Godavari's mother-in-law. She is also Arvind, Subodh, Harshad, Gopal, Charubala, Praveen and Radhika's grandmother, and Hemal's foster grandmother. She has Amnesia and hence forgets things and sometimes thinks she's in the past or in the future. Hence few members make fun of her illness by saying 'Phirse channel change hogaya'.
- Supriya Pathak as Gunvanti Mami: She is Godavari's sister-in-law. As she decided to settle in USA, she gave her bungalow, Krishna Villa, to Godavari. She offered to make the bungalow Godavari's legal property. But Godavari said that it was not needed as she trusted Gunvanti, and that she had faith that Gunvanti would not make them all homeless. She is much stingy and demanding. She often starts crying remembering her deceased brother (Hemal's biological father) and shows off her in his name. She is Raju's mother.
- Jiten Lalwani as Malay Tijoriwala: He is the Thakkars' childhood friend. His wife died due to tumor. Gopal wanted him to marry Radhika.
- Girish Pardeshi as Kamlesh Kakkad: He is Radhika's friend and ex prospectkve groom. He used to stammer on the letter k but with proper therapy, he can now speak k without stammering. Charubala had thought of getting Radhika and Kamlesh married, but Radhika refused for marriage saying that she wanted to see the world and be something.
- Madhavi Juvekar as Urmila Wagle: She is one of the Thakkars' neighbours. Due to a misunderstanding created by Arvind and Gopal, the Thakkars casually call her UW (which actually stands for Underwear).
- Atmaram Bhende as Damodar Kaka: He is one of the Thakkars' neighbours. As he faced a financial loss, the Thakkars helped him to pay for his grand daughter Vandana's wedding.
- Ayush Mahesh Khedekar as Gullel: He was kidnapped and taken away from his parents. Somehow, he escaped the kidnappers and started living on streets. Gopal found him and brought him home. The Thakkars published his photo in the newspaper, hoping that his parents would come for him. And they did come. They heartily thanked the Thakkars and took him home.
- Nimisha Vakharia as Prema: Prema is a maid who looks exactly like Charubala. Leela and Praveena hired her to tease and irritate Charubala.
- Kamalika Guha Thakurta as Revathi: She is Ashutosh'z ex-wife, and Anish and Aarya's mother. She first hesitated to follow Godavari's traditions in Dimple and Anish's engagement. But eventually, she agreed.
- Jitendra Trehan as Ashutosh Kotak: He is Revathi's ex-husband, Anish and Aarya's father. He and Revathi were divorced.
- Aditi Pratap as Aarya Kotak: She is Anish's sister.
- Ali Raza Namdar as Jasvant a.k.a. Jassu Bhai: He was about to be engaged to Leela, but Leela's father changed his mind and got Arvind and Leela married. Thus, when Jassu Bhai came to the Thakkars' house, Arvind got jealous on seeing Leela giggling and blushing. Arvind grunted every time he saw Jassu Bhai with Leela, and tried to keep them from talking to each other.
- Pushkar Shrotri as Inspector Paranjpe: He is a police inspector and the Thakkars' neighbour.
- Shubha Khote as Mangu Mausi: She is the Thakkars' new neighbour. She is a trickster and asks for things from people in a way that no one can deny. She fills people's mind with rubbish things.
- Simple Kaul as Malaika: She was Birju's first crush.
- Aatish Kapadia as Prinjal: He was the Thakkars' former neighbour. His parents sent his marriage proposal for Radhika. But after meeting Prinjal, Radhika refused to marry him.
- Arya Rawal as Amita: She was engaged to Harshad. But she requested Baa to break the engagement due to an affair between her and someone else, and because she was pregnant. Baa broke the engagement. Baa did not disclose the reason for breaking the engagement, to preserve Amita's reputation. Amita's mother, unaware of this secret, criticised Baa for ten years until she found out the truth.
- Resham Tipnis as Devki: She is Praveena's sister and Mehul, Mitali and Chaitali's aunt. Few Thakkar family members wanted her to marry Praveen after Praveena's death.
- Bhamini Oza as Ms. Jagruti: She is the children's Gujarati and P.E. teacher, who had a fight with Praveen.
- Deepshikha Nagpal as Ichha: She is the Thakkars' childhood friend. All the males in the family, especially Praveen, try to impress her whenever she visits them. This annoyed the ladies of the house.
- Amit Singh Thakur as Mr. Kakkad
- Chetan Hansraj as Kuku: He is Gurinder's friend whom she thought of as a brother. After seeing that all the males in the family were circling Ichha, and ignoring their wives, Gurinder invited Kuku to make the males jealous.
- Anupama Singh as Sumitra Mehta: She is Birju's mother and Radhika's mother-in-law.
- Dolly Minhas as Janki Mehta: Birju's aunt (Tai). Her husband died in a car accident along with his younger brother (Birju's father).
- Neena Kulkarni as Asha Ben: She was a writer who wrote Godavari's biography as a dedication to all those housewives whose work went unappreciated.
- Amardeep Jha as Meenakshi: the dhabha owner.
- Meenal Karpe as Malti Bhayani: Tushar's mother and Charubala's mother-in-law.
- Mehul Buch as Devendra Marfatia: Pooja's father.
- Mohan Bhandari as Priyavadhan Raichura: He is Leela's father, Arvind's father-in-law and Jigar and Dimple's maternal grandfather. He is a rich businessman who married Leela in the Thakkar family seeing Godavari's feminism and caring nature. He and Arvind have a complicated relationship.
- Darshan Jariwala as Dr. Akhilesh Jha: He is the doctor who conducted Soumil's operation during Soumil's tumor.
- Swati Shah as Mayuri Ben: She is one of the Thakkars' neighbours.
- Pooja Ruparel as Falguni Ruparel: She is a rich girl. Hemal fell in love with her. But after learning that Falguni wanted to marry her equal (someone rich), Hemal forgot about her.
- Delnaaz Irani as Zenobia: Praveen once fell in love with her before marriage.
- Karan Sharma as Anirudh Desai
- Harish Patel as Parshuram Talwar
- Rupali Ganguly as Rekha Sharma: Gatuki's mother.
- Firoz Irani as Baba Bakshi: He is a builder who tried to buy Krishna Villa forcibly from the Thakkars. He tried many tricks to convince them. He even tried to kill them all once. But eventually, the Thakkars saved Krishna Villa. And, after getting a glimpse of Godavari's feminism and courage, he excepted his defeat and became a good man.
- Sakshi Sem as Pooja Marfatia: Hemal's second love, who betrayed his trust.

=== Special appearances ===
- Sharman Joshi to promote Shaadi No. 1
- Soha Ali Khan to promote Shaadi No. 1
- Ayesha Takia to promote Shaadi No. 1
- Fardeen Khan to promote Shaadi No. 1
- Esha Deol to promote Shaadi No. 1
- Zayed Khan to promote Shaadi No. 1
- Falguni Pathak as Herself in the Navratri special episode
- Jay Chhaniyara to promote The Great Indian Laughter Challenge
- Bakhtiyaar Irani to promote Nach Baliye 2
- Tanaaz Currim to promote Nach Baliye 2
- Rakhi Sawant to promote Nach Baliye 3
- Abhishek Avasthi to promote Nach Baliye 3
- Juhi Chawla to promote Bhoothnath
- Katrina Kaif to promote Singh Is Kinng

== Production ==
The series was filmed at Swathi Studio in Goregaon, Mumbai.

In November 2008, the shootings and telecast of all the Hindi television series including this series and films were stalled on 8 November 2008 due to dispute by the technician workers of FWICE (Federation of Western India Cine Employees) for increasing the wages, better work conditions and more breaks between shootings. FWICE first took a strike on 1 October 2008 when they addressed their problems with the producers and production was stalled. A contract was signed after four days discussions, and shooting was happening only for two hours per day, after which differences increased between them while channels gave them time until 30 October 2008 to sort it out. Failing to do so led to protests again from 10 November 2008 to 19 November 2008, during which channels blacked out new broadcasts and repeat telecasts were shown from 10 November 2008. On 19 November 2008, the strike was called off after settling the disputes and the production resumed. The new episodes started to telecast from 1 December 2008.

== In other media ==
Gattu's character, portrayed by Deven Bhojani, was used in the 2012 drama serial Alaxmi Ka Super Parivaar where he came as the nephew of Natwarlal and Mohandas.

== Reception ==
The Indian Express stated, "The strength of the show is its characters that deliver a power-packed performance. The right concoction of situational humour and proper representation of characters remains the forte of the show. With an ensemble cast of seasoned stage artistes, the show manages to hold attention and evoke laughter. The show is an instant hit among the womenfolk. It's a sweet humorous tale worth a dekko."

== Awards and nominations ==
Year	Awards	Category	Recipient(s)	Result	Ref{s}
2006	Indian Television Academy Awards	Best Actor – Comedy	Deven Bhojani	Won	
2006	Indian Television Academy Awards	Best Supporting Actress – Drama	Vaishali Thakkar	Won	
2007	Indian Television Academy Awards	Best Serial – Drama	Baa Bahoo Aur Baby	Won	
2007	Indian Television Academy Awards	Best Supporting Actor – Male	Paresh Ganatra	Won	
2007	Indian Television Academy Awards	Best Actress – Comedy	Sucheeta Trivedi	Won	
2007	Indian Television Academy Awards	Best Child Artist	Swini Khara	Won	
2007	Indian Television Academy Awards	Best Teleplay	Aatish Kapadia	Won	
2008	Indian Television Academy Awards	Best Actor – Drama	Deven Bhojani	Won	
