= Instant Khichdi =

Indian sitcom series

- Logo
- Genre: Sitcom
- Starring: See below
- Country of origin: India
- Original language: Hindi
- No. of seasons: 3
- No. of episodes: 38

Production
- Running time: approximately 25 minutes

Original release
- Network: STAR Plus
- Release: July 1 – August 7, 2005

Related
- Khichdi; Khichdi Returns

Instant Khichdi is an Indian sitcom that aired on STAR One from 1 July 2005 to 7 August 2005. The series served as the second season of Khichdi franchise and a sequel to the show Khichdi, which aired on STAR Plus channel. The show has been made into a film: Khichdi: The Movie.

== Plot ==
The series portrays the life of an eccentric Gujarati joint family living in Mumbai. The family is led by the elderly Tulsidas Parekh and consists of his offspring, who he acquired at a local carnival. The first season, particularly the initial episodes, focus on the idiosyncratic members of the family who are only united by their desire to separate from each other. Since the patriarch does not permit them to sell off their house and separate into nuclear families, they live on hoping that he changes his mind or passes away. Eventually, they move into a much larger house left behind by a deceased aunt.

They become overnight millionaires when they discover oil in their older property. The second season portrays humorous depictions of a bourgeois family that is trying to settle itself into higher society with their new-found wealth. They live on in their own eccentric way, trying to ace the lives of the super-rich.

== Cast ==
- Anang Desai as Tulsidas Parekh a.k.a. Babuji: Praful, Bharat, Raju, Heera and Meera's father; Hansa, Jayashree, Melissa and Bhavesh Kumar's father-in-law; Damyanti's widower; Tiwariben's son and Jackky and Chakki's grandfather.
- Rajeev Mehta as Praful Tulsidas Parekh:Tulsidas and Damyanti's elder son; Hansa's husband; Bharat, Raju, Heera and Meera's elder brother and Chakki's father.
- Supriya Pathak as Hansa Praful Parekh: Praful's wife; Chandrakant's daughter; Himanshu's elder sister; Tulsidas's eldest daughter-in-law and Chakki's mother.
- Vandana Pathak as Jayshree Bharat Parekh:Tulsidas's widowed second daughter-in-law; Bharat's widow; Jignesh's elder sister and Jackky's mother.
- Jamnadas Majethia as Himanshu Chandrakant Seth: Hansa's younger brother; Behen Parminder's husband.
- Richa Bhadra as Chakki Praful Parekh:Hansa and Praful's daughter. Jackky's cousin and Tulsidas's granddaughter.
- Yash Mittal as Jackky Bharat Parekh: Jayashree and Bharat's son; Chakki's cousin and Tulsidas's grandson.
- Amit Varma as Raju Tulsidas Parekh
- Tina Parekh as Melissa Raju Parekh
- Arya Rawal as Heera Tulsidas Parekh: Tulsidas's eldest daughter; Praful, Bharat, Raju and Meera's sister.
- Kamlesh Oza as Bhavesh Kumar
- Aatish Kapadia as Jignesh
- Gireesh Sahedev as Parminder Singh: Bhai Parminder and Behen Parminder's brother.
- Anokhi Srivastava as Parminder Himanshu Seth: Bhai Parminder and Parminder Singh's sister and Himanshu's wife.
- Sweety Nayak as Madhuri
- Lily Patel as Tiwariben Parekh a.k.a. Badi Maa
- Deepesh Shah as Inspector Dheeman (and various characters)
- Ami Trivedi as Mira Tulsidas Parekh (archived footage)

=== Guest appearances ===
- Delnaaz Irani as Shehnaaz
- Sachin Shroff as Pranay
- Disha Vakani as Nisha
- Kalpana Diwan as Jagdamba Maami (photo)
- Kishwer Merchantt as Rambha
- Shabnam Sayed as Kaamna
- Dinyar Contractor as Mr. Mehta
- Deven Bhojani as 'Vodka' Genie
- Smita Singh as Sandhya Devi
- Aanchal Dwivedi as Savitri
- Shweta Kawatra as Cindy
- Manav Gohil as Wilson
- Chetan Hansraj as Rakesh
- Dimple Shah as Hetal
- Jignesh Joshi as Manish (and other characters)
- Cast of Sarabhai vs Sarabhai in the crossover episode

== Awards and nominations ==
=== Indian Telly Awards ===
Year	Nominated Work	Category	Result	Ref.
2005	Supriya Pathak as Hansa	Best Actor in a Comic Role (Female)	Won	
2005	Yash Mittal as Jacky	Best Child Artiste (Male)	Won	
2005	Aatish Kapadia	Best Sitcom / Comedy Writer	Nominated	
2005	Vandana Pathak as Jayshree	Best Actor in a Comic Role (Female)	Nominated	
2005	Rajeev Mehta as Praful	Best Actor in Comic Role (Male)	Nominated	
2005		Best Sitcom/Comedy Programme	Nominated	
