= Producers Guild Film Award for Best Actor in a Comic Role =

Annual Indian film award

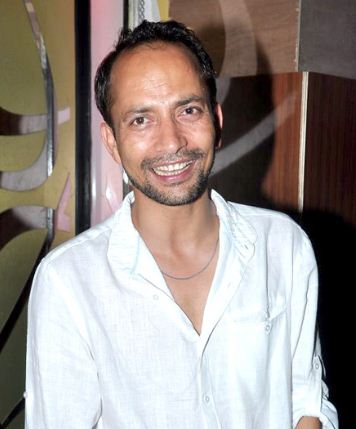
- 2016 Recipient Deepak Dobriyal
- Awarded for: Best Performance by an Actor in a Comic Role
- Country: India
- Presented by: Film & Television Producers Guild
- First award: 2008 (for performances in films released around 2007)
- Currently held by: Deepak Dobriyal, Tanu Weds Manu Returns (2016)
- Website: Producers Guild Film Awards

The Producers Guild Film Award for Best Actor in a Comic Role (previously known as the Apsara Award for Best Actor in a Comic Role) is given by the producers of the film and television guild as part of its annual award ceremony for Hindi films, to recognise an actor who has delivered an outstanding performance in a comic role. While the official awards ceremony started in 2004, this category was first introduced four years later.

== Superlatives ==
Superlative	Best Actor in a Comic Role	
Actor with most awards	--	--
Actor with most nominations	Vinay Pathak; Ritesh Deshmukh; Sanjay Mishra	2
Actor with most nominations (without ever winning)	Ritesh Deshmukh; Sanjay Mishra	2

== Winners and nominees ==
=== 2000s ===
- 2004 – No award
- 2005 – No award
- 2006 – No award
- 2007 – No award
- 2008 Vinay Pathak – Bheja Fry as Bharat Bhushan
  - Akshay Kumar – Bhool Bhulaiyaa as Dr. Aditya Shrivastav
  - Govinda – Partner as Bhaskar Devakar Chaudhary
  - Irrfan Khan – Life in a... Metro as Monty
  - Javed Jaffrey – Dhamaal as Manav Shrivastav
- 2009 Anil Kapoor – Welcome as Majnu Bhai
  - Boman Irani – Dostana as M a.k.a. Murli
  - Nana Patekar – Welcome as Uday Shetty
  - Rajpal Yadav – Bhoothnath as "The Bhooth" Anthony
  - Shreyas Talpade – Welcome to Sajjanpur as Mahadev Kushwaha

=== 2010s ===
- 2010 Ajay Devgn – All the Best: Fun Begins as Prem Chopra
  - Darshan Jariwala – Ajab Prem Ki Ghazab Kahani as Shiv Shankar Sharma
  - Ritesh Deshmukh – Do Knot Disturb as Govardhan
  - Sanjay Mishra – Aloo Chaat as Chhadami Mama
  - Vinay Pathak – Rab Ne Bana Di Jodi as Balwinder "Bobby" Khosla
- 2011 Paresh Rawal – Atithi Tum Kab Jaoge? as Lambodar Bajpai (Chachaji)
  - Jamnadas Majethia – Khichdi: The Movie as Himanshu Seth
  - Omkar Das Manikpuri – Peepli Live as Natha
  - Ritesh Deshmukh – Housefull as Baburao (Bob)
  - Sanjay Mishra – Phas Gaye Re Obama as Bhai Saab
- 2012 Deepak Dobriyal - Tanu Weds Manu as Pappi Ji
  - Bobby Deol - Yamla Pagla Deewana as Gajodhar Singh Dhillon
  - Javed Jaffrey - Double Dhamaal as Manav Shrivastav
  - Kartik Tiwari - Pyaar Ka Punchnama as Rajat
  - Paresh Rawal - Ready as Balidaan Bhardwaj
- 2013 Abhishek Bachchan & Annu Kapoor - Bol Bachchan & Vicky Donor as Abbas Ali/Abhishek Bachchan & Dr. Baldev Chaddha
  - Ritesh Deshmukh - Kyaa Super Kool Hain Hum as Sid
  - Krishna Abhishek - Bol Bachchan as Ravi Shastri
  - Rishi Kapoor - Student of the Year as Deon Yogendra Vasisth
  - Johnny Lever - Housefull 2 as Mithai Patil
- 2014 Varun Sharma & Arshad Warsi - Fukrey & Jolly LLB as Dilip Singh & Jagdish Tyagi/Jolly
- 2015 Varun Dhawan - Main Tera Hero as Seenu
- 2016 Deepak Dobriyal - Tanu Weds Manu: Returns as Pappi Kutti

== See also ==
- Producers Guild Film Awards
