= Baap Re Baap (2019 film) =

2019 Gujarati thriller comedy film

- Theatrical Release Poster
- Directed by: Sagar Kalaria
- Written by: Dhaval Rathod
- Produced by: Parth Banugaria; Sachin Rathod
- Starring: Rajeev Mehta; Tej Joshi; Tillana Desai; Bhargav Thaker; Pratik Rathod
- Cinematography: Bhumil Soochak
- Edited by: Sachin Desai; Kaushal Gondaliya
- Music by: Rajiv Bhatt
- Production companies: Patang Films; Fikar Not Films
- Release date: 18 January 2019
- Running time: 120 minutes
- Country: India
- Language: Gujarati

Baap Re Baap (English: Father O Father!) is a 2019 Gujarati comedy thriller film directed by Sagar Kalaria, produced by Parth Banugaria and Sachin Rathod under the banner of Patang films in association with Fikar Not Films. The film starring Rajeev Mehta in the title role along with Tej Joshi, highlights a father and son relationship. The film was released in India on 18 January 2019.

== Plot ==
The relation between Ajay (Tej Joshi) and his father (Rajeev Mehta) has turned sour after the untimely death of the former's mother. As Ajay becomes more and more egotistic, self-centered and rebellious, he even loses his best friends in the process. At such an unexpected crossroads of his life, fate serves him a lesson he must learn and put at stake everything that he has taken for granted. What ensues is a hyper-coaster ride of thrill, humor and emotions altogether. The film traces his journey of grappling with these challenges and coming to terms with everything he has ruined.

== Cast ==
- Rajeev Mehta as Purushottam (The Baap)
- Tej Joshi as Ajay
- Tillana Desai as Sapna
- Bhargav Thaker as Vinit
- Pratik Rathod as Divyesh
- Farooq Khan as Sukhiram
- Dilip Dave as Shantilal
- Kiran Mehta as Hoshiyarchand
- Paresh Shukla as Mansukh
- Manohar Kapadia as Bahadur
- Tejas Parmar as Aamli
- Nihar Nanavati as Pipli
- Hemang Dave as Champak Sheth
- Dilip Soni as Harbu
- Prapti Ajwalia as Nidhi
- Alka Mehta as Hansaben
- Maurali Patel as Sarlaben
- Deepika Ajwalia as Mallikaben
- Milan Trivedi as Kidnapper

== Production ==
=== Development ===
The idea for the film was conceived in April, 2015 when the producers hired Sagar Kalaria as the director for their maiden project. Patang Films struck up an association with Fikar Not Films, two-time Gold Film of the Year winners at India Film Project. This liaison led to the other key members joining the team. Scripting began in the month of May and was concluded in the month of October. Tej Joshi was cast as the lead and Rajeev Mehta was signed for the titular role of the father.

=== Filming ===
Principal photography commenced in November, 2015. The film was shot at various locations of Rajkot and Ahmedabad.

=== Post-production ===
The film suffered numerous unforeseen challenges in the post-production phase which lasted for almost three years.

== Soundtrack ==
The music was released by Krup Music.

Track listing
No.	Title	Lyrics	Singer(s)	Length
1	"Baap Re Baap"	Aarsh Panchmatiya	Jasraj Joshi	3:16
2	"Andharya Raste"	Bhargav Thaker	Divya Kumar	3:52
3	"Baap Re Baap" Rap	Arjun Mehta	Arjun Mehta	3:34
			Total Length:	10:42

== Release ==
The trailer of the film was unveiled on 20 December 2018 and the film was released on 18 January 2019.
