= Rajeev Mehta =

Indian actor

- Born: India
- Occupation: Actor
- Years active: 1992–present

Rajeev Mehta is an Indian actor who works in Hindi television shows and Hindi films. He is best known for his comic role as Praful Parekh in the television comedy-drama Khichdi and as Arvind Thakkar in Baa Bahoo Aur Baby, both of which aired on Star Plus.

== Filmography ==
=== Films ===
Year	Film	Character	Notes
1992	Beta	Groom in a Marriage	
1995	Rangeela	Steward in Restaurant	Cameo
1997	Daud: Fun on the Run	Khurana	
1998	Satya	Lawyer	
2000	Hera Pheri	Laundry Business Owner	Cameo
2000	Khiladi 420	Rajiv	
2004	Aan: Men at Work	Tawde	Cameo
2005	Waqt: The Race Against Time		
2010	Khichdi: The Movie	Praful Parekh	
2011	Bbuddah... Hoga Terra Baap	Prem	
2012	Businessman	Arun Ghokale	Telugu film
2013	Sadda Haq	Professor	
2013	Happy Family Pvt Ltd	Uttam	Gujarati film
2015	Bas Ek Chance		Gujarati film
2017	Irada	Abdul Hassan	
2017	Chal Man Jeetva Jaiye	Suryakant	Gujarati film
2018	Back Bencher	Principal	Gujarati film
2019	Baap Re Baap	Purushottam (The Baap)	Gujarati film
2023	Khichdi 2: Mission Paanthukistan	Praful Parekh/ Shehanshah	
2024	Sikandar Ka Muqaddar	Mangesh Desai	
2025	Vishwaguru		

=== Television ===
Year(s)	Show	Role	Notes
1988–1990	Jeevan Mrityu	Son in Law	Gujarati-language series
1999–2002	Ek Mahal Ho Sapno Ka	Sameer Purushottam Nanavati	
2000	Hum Sab Ek Hain	Fursad Mehta (stockbroker)	Episode 98
2002–2003	Khichdi	Praful Parekh	
2003	Karishma Kaa Karishma	Praful Parekh	Special appearance
2005–2006	Instant Khichdi	Praful Parekh	
2005	Sarabhai vs Sarabhai	Praful Parekh	Khichdi with Sarabhai Part 1 and 2
2005–2010	Baa Bahoo Aur Baby	Arvind Thakkar	
2010	Taarak Mehta Ka Ooltah Chashmah	Praful Parekh	Special appearance to promote Khichdi: The Movie
2012	Ek Doosre Se Karte Hain Pyaar Hum	Nikhilesh Majumdar	
2013–2014	Bh Se Bhade		
2015	Badi Door Se Aaye Hai		
2015	Comedy Classes	Praful Parekh	Guest
2016	Khidki	Ashok Kumar Thakkar	Story 1 "Anju ki Shadi"
2016	Khidki	Professor Hasmukh Jobanputra	Story 6 "Kya Karain Kya na Karain?"
2018	Khichdi	Praful Parekh	
