= Khichdi (2018 TV series) =

- Also known as: Khichdi Returns
- Genre: Sitcom
- Written by: JD Majethia
- Directed by: Aatish Kapadia
- Starring: Supriya Pathak; Anang Desai; Rajeev Mehta; Vandana Pathak; JD Majethia
- Country of origin: India
- Original language: Hindi
- No. of episodes: 23

Production
- Producer: JD Majethia
- Production locations: Mumbai, Maharashtra, India
- Production company: Hats Off Productions

Original release
- Network: StarPlus
- Release: 14 April – 17 June 2018

Related
- Khichdi; Instant Khichdi

Khichdi is an Indian television comedy series that premiered on 14 April 2018 on StarPlus. Positioned as the third season on television and the fourth installment in the Khichdi franchise, the show featured the same principal cast and introduced a slightly modified storyline.

The series ended on 17 June 2018 as it did not receive expected ratings.

== Cast ==
=== Main ===
- Anang Desai as Tulsidas Parekh (Babuji)
- Rajeev Mehta as Praful Parekh
- Supriya Pathak as Hansa Parekh
- Vandana Pathak as Jayshree Parekh
- JD Majethia as Himanshu Seth

=== Recurring ===
- Sameksha as Parminder
- Mishri Majethia as Chakki
- Agastya Kapadia as Jackky
- Balvinder Singh Suri as Parminder Singh
- Anuradha Verma as Mrs.Parminder Parminder Singh
- Shruti Rawat as Mrs Menon
- Melissa Pais as Mrs. D'Souza
- Farhad Shahnawaz as Tony
- Bakhtiyaar Irani as Peter
- Arvind Vaidya as Chandrakant Seth
- Falguni Rajani as Saguna
- Punit Talreja as Various characters
- Vindhya Tiwari as Various characters
- Aatish Kapadia as Jignesh and various characters
- Amit Dolawat as Various characters
- Ashita Dhawan as Komal

=== Guest ===
- Renuka Shahane as Bawaskar Madam
- Vinay Rohrra as Indra
- Sarita Joshi as Champa Kaki
- Deepak Pareek as Arnab Sardesai
- Umesh Shukla as Painter
- Debina Bonnerjee as Painter
- Rajesh Kumar as Ravana
- Krunal Pandit as Jadugar Vashikaran
- Manoj Goyal as Mr. Jagat Agarwal
- Neelam Pathania as Mrs. Agarwal
- Deepshikha Nagpal as Dr. Tilottama Dhakdhaki
- Paresh Ganatra as Advocate Pandit (Lawyer)
- Apara Mehta as Yashoda Mausi
- Romiit Raaj as Virendra Pathak (The Poet)
