= Deven Bhojani =

Indian actor (born 1969)

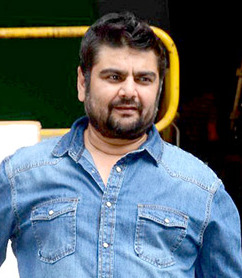
- Bhojani in 2016
- Born: 25 November 1969 (age 56); Bombay, Maharashtra, India
- Occupations: Actor, director
- Years active: 1987–present

Deven Bhojani (born 25 November 1969) is an Indian actor. He is a theatre artist, who is best known for his Gujarati plays. He made his television debut with Shankar Nag’s famous show Malgudi Days in 1987. He mainly gained popularity for his comic roles and for playing some supporting characters. He has won three best director awards for Sarabhai vs Sarabhai, The ITA Award, The Indian Telly Award and The Apsara Award.

== Early life ==
Bhojani is a Gujarati Lohana, born and raised in Bombay (now Mumbai), Maharashtra.

== Education ==
He completed his schooling from Gokalibai Punamchand Pitamber High School, Vile Parle, Mumbai. Bhojani did his graduation in Commerce from SVKM's NMIMS, Mumbai. He studied film direction at the University of Southern California.

== Filmography ==
=== Films ===
==== As actor ====
Year	Titles	Role	Notes
1992	Jo Jeeta Wohi Sikander	Ghanshyam (Ghansu)	Also assistant director
1994	Aaja Sanam		
1994	Andaz	Ajay	
1994	Kranti Kshetra		
1995	Sarhad: The Border of Crime	Deven	
1995	Kartavya		
1996	Uff! Yeh Mohabbat		
1997	Dil Kitna Nadan Hai	Daddu	
1999	Chalo America	Akshay	
2004	Yeh Lamhe Judaai Ke	Vipul Kothari	
2010	Khichdi: The Movie	Brain Hemorrhage Patient	Special appearance
2011	Chala Mussaddi... Office Office	Patel	
2012	Agneepath	Azhar Lala	
2023	Dunki	Advocate Puru Pardipbhai Patel	
2024	Murder Mubarak	Devendra Bhatti	
2024	Udan Chhoo	Hasmukh Mehta	Gujarati cinema debut
2026	Dhabkaaro	Dahyabhai / Ashok Patel	
2026	Reporting Live	Vinod	Plays a news cameraman.

==== As director ====
Year	Titles
2017	Commando 2: The Black Money Trail

=== Television ===
==== As actor ====
Year	Titles	Role	Notes
1987	Malgudi Days	Nitya	Episode 22
1993–1994	Dekh Bhai Dekh	Karima	
1993	Tara	Petha	
1994	Shrimaan Shrimati	Adult Chintu	Episode 63
1995	V 3 +	Vinny	
1997	Ek Mahal Ho Sapno Ka	Raju Rajkotwala	
1998–2001	Hum Sab Ek Hain	Rohan Khachroo	
2001–2004	Office Office	Patel	
2002	Shree Sifarshilaal	Sifarshilaal	
2003	Khichdi	Dr. Praful Shah	
2004–2006	Sarabhai vs Sarabhai	Dushyant	Also Creative director
2005–2010	Baa Bahoo Aur Baby	Gopal Thakker (Gattu)	Also Creative director
2005	Instant Khichdi	Genie	Special appearance
2006	Naya Office Office	Patel	
2009	Remote Control	Babulnath	
2011	Mrs Tendulkar	Mr. Suhaas Tendulkar	
2012–2013	Alaxmi Ka Super Parivaar	Gattu	
2013	Bh Se Bhade	Bhade	
2014	Badi Door Se Aaye Hai	Advocate Jugal Raichura	Special appearance
2014	Gulmohar Grand	Mr. Gopal	Episodic role
2017	Sarabhai vs Sarabhai Take 2	Dushyant	
2018	Namune	Murari	
2019–2020	Bhakharwadi	Balkrishna Gokhale (Anna)	Lead
2021	Wagle Ki Duniya - Nayi Peedhi Naye Kissey	Balkrishna Gokhale (Anna)	Guest
2023	Taaza Khabar	Mehboob	
2023	Scoop	Mama	
2025	Black, White & Gray - Love Kills	Rao	
2026	Adarsh Baal Vidyalaya	Goldy Randhawa	
2026	Chumbak	Kuku Merchant	

==== As director ====
Year	Title	Notes
2004–2006	Sarabhai vs Sarabhai	Creative Director
2014–2015	Pukaar - Call For The Hero	
2015–2016	Sumit Sambhal Lega	

==== As producer ====
Year	Titles	Notes
2012	Bhai Bhaiya Aur Brother	
