= Anang Desai =

Indian film and television actor

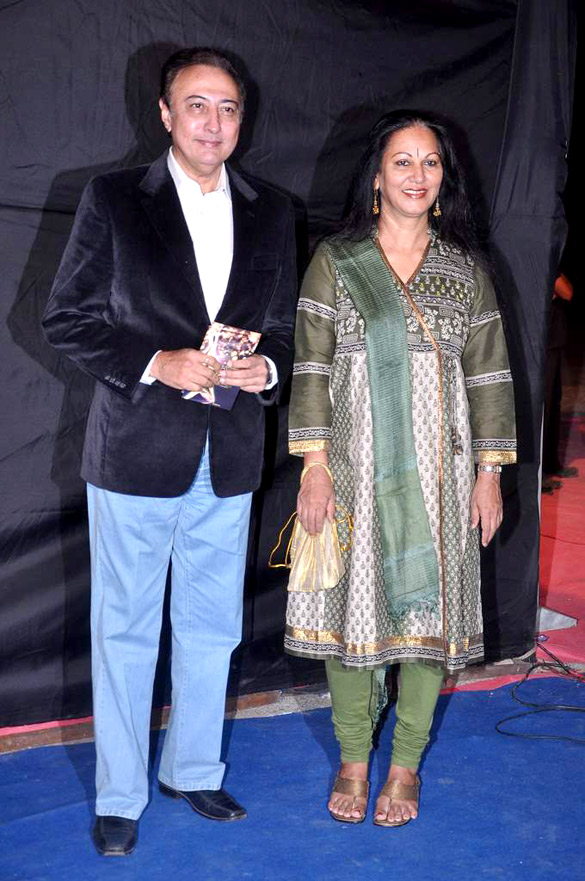
- Anang Desai with his wife at Colors Indian Telly Awards
- Born: 4 May 1953 (age 73); Ahmedabad, Bombay State, India (now in Gujarat)
- Occupation: Actor
- Years active: 1982–present

Anang Desai (born 4 May 1953) is an Indian film and television actor. Desai has appeared in more than 100 television shows and 70 films, known for his portrayal of the character Babuji in the television series Khichdi and its eponymous film. He is an alumnus of the National School of Drama, New Delhi and was a part of the institute's professional repertory, performing Hindi theatre extensively before starting his career in the television and film domains.

== Film career ==
Anang Desai started his film career in 1982 with Gandhi, in which he played Indian politician J. B. Kripalani.

== Filmography ==
Year	Title	Role	Language	Notes	Ref.
1982	Gandhi	J.B. Kripalani	English		
1986	Antaheen				
1986	The Natural World - The Man Eaters of Kumaon	Shankar			
1986	New Delhi Times	Inspector	Hindi		
1988	Falak (The Sky)	Doctor			
1988	Bharat Ek Khoj	Raja Ram Mohan Roy			
1989	Parinda	Inspector Meerani	Hindi		
1989	Parinati	Lachman			
1990	Kroadh	Jailor Aslam Khan			
1990	Jurm	Inspector Narayan	Hindi		
1990	Aashiqui	Mr. Paul	Hindi		
1992	Suraj Ka Satvan Ghoda	Jamuna's father			
1992	Angaar	Doctor at State Mental Asylum		Uncredited	
1992	Junoon	Dr.Desai	Hindi	Uncredited	
1993	Lootere				
1993	Sir	The doctor	Hindi		
1993	Gumrah	Ahuja			
1993	Amok	Le chauffeur	French		
1993	Gunaah	Rai	Hindi		
1994	Dilwale	Dr. Deshpande			
1995	Tarpan (The Absolution)	Pratap Singh			
1995	Trimurti				
1995	Dil Ka Doctor	Mehboob Sahle			
1996	Bal Bramhachari	Prof. Vijay Tripathi	Hindi		
1998	Jhooth Bole Kauwa Kaate	Mr. Sharma			
1999	Dahek: A Burning Passion	Javed Bahkshi			
1999:	Hum Dil De Chuke Sanam				
2000	Hamara Dil Aapke Paas Hai	Avinash's father	Hindi	Uncredited	
2001	Ek Rishtaa: The Bond of Love	Brij	Hindi		
2001	Yaadein	L. K. Malhotra	Hindi		
2001	Bas Itna Sa Khwaab Hai	Chandan Shrivastav	Hindi		
2002	Mamta				
2002	Raaz	Mr. Dhanraj upset father	Hindi		
2002	Na Tum Jaano Na Hum	Akshaye's dad	Hindi		
2002	Badhaai Ho Badhaai	Moses D'Souza	Hindi		
2002	Shararat	Mr Sengupta	Hindi		
2002	Pyaasa	Mr Thakur	Hindi		
2002	Maa Tujhe Salaam	Shiva	Hindi		
2003	Dum	Leader			
2003	Ishq Vishk				
2003	Tere Naam	Doctor	Hindi		
2003	Baghban	Mr. Verma (Kapil's dad)			
2003	Raja Bhaiya		Hindi		
2003	Maa Santoshi Maa				
2004	Uuf Kya Jaadoo Mohabbat Hai		Hindi		
2004	Madhosi	Oberoi	Hindi		
2004	Agnipankh				
2005	Yakeen	Doctor			
2005	7 1/2 Phere: More Than a Wedding	Suresh Joshi	Hindi		
2005	Dhamkee	Jagannath Dholakia aka J.D.	Hindi		
2006	Humko Tumse Pyaar Hai	Raj's Father			
2006	Sandwich	The plastic surgeon	Hindi		
2006	Utthaan	Chaudhary	Hindi		
2006	Sarhad Paar	R. K. Gupta, Home Secretary			
2007	Salaam-e-Ishq: A Tribute to Love	Mr Raina	Hindi		
2007	Good Boy, Bad Boy	Mr. P.K. Malhotra			
2008	Ek Vivaah... Aisa Bhi	Natasha's dad			
2010	Khichdi: The Movie	Tulsidas Parekh	Hindi	Based on the sitcom Khichdi	
2011	Warning	Mauland Asfraf	Hindi		
2012	Kevi Rite Jaish	Ishwarbhai Patel	Gujarati	Won Best Supporting Actor at 12th Transmedia Awards	
2015	Take it Easy	Dadaji	Hindi		
2016	Rustom	Judge Patel	Hindi		
2022	Jaysuk Zdpayo	Pratap Rai	Gujarati		
2022	Tu Rajee Re		Gujarati		
2022	Dhaman		Gujarati		
2023	Aazam	Firoz Namazi	Hindi		
2023	Welcome Zindagi		Gujarati		
2023	Khichdi 2: Mission Paanthukistan	Tulsidas Parekh	Hindi		
2024	Kaagaz 2	Politician	Hindi		
2025	Haq	Judge H. N. Vashishth	Hindi		
2025	Malik Ni Varta		Gujarati		
2026	Firki		Gujarati		

=== Television shows ===
- Pratishodh as Raghunath Verma
- 1988: Bharat Ek Khoj as Rajan (in Episode 3 - The Arrival of the Vedic People)
  Ram Mohan Roy (in Episode 41 - The Bengal Renaissance)
- 1990: Tenali Rama as King Krishnadevaraya
- 1991–92: Humrahi
- 1994: Byomkesh Bakshi (Episode: Ret ka Daldal/Quicksand) as Himangshu Roy
- 1995: Aahat as Abhay Kumar (in Episode 7 - Death Sentence)
  Pritvi (in Episode 88-89 - Yaad)
- 1995–1996: Akbar Birbal as Birbal
- 1996: Karm as Mr. Solanki
- 1997–1998: Chattaan as Kamal Chopra
- 1997: Bombay Blue as Dr. Johal
- 1997–1999: Tanha
- 1998 Teacher
- 1998–1999: Tejaswini
- 1999: Basera: Special Appearance
- 2001 Kudrat as Udaynarayan Seth
- 2001-2003: Gharana
- 2002–04: Khichdi as Tulsidas Parekh
- 2003 Vishwaas as Raghuvansh Pradhan
- 2004: Pyaar Ki Kashti Mein
- 2004–2006: Reth as Gyan Pandey
- 2005–06: India Calling as Mr. Kapoor
- 2005–06: Instant Khichdi as Tulsidas Parekh
- 2006–2007: Woh Rehne Waali Mehlon Ki as Jamnadas (J.D.) Thapar
- 2006–2007: Kashmakash Zindagi Ki as Rajdev
- 2006–2007 Lucky as Acharya Joshi
- 2007–09: Teen Bahuraaniyaan as Dwarkadas
- 2007–09: Lucky as Acharya Joshi
- 2008–09: Jasuben Jayantilaal Joshi Ki Joint Family as Jayantilaal Joshi
- 2009: Star Vivaah: Guest appearance
- 2009: Ladies Special as Jassi's father
- 2009-10: Jo Kahunga Sach Kahunga as prosecutor KK gairola
- 2010: Miley Jab Hum Tum as Shashi Bhushan
- 2010: Taarak Mehta Ka Ooltah Chashmah as Tulsidas Parekh (Special appearance)
- 2010: Mrs. & Mr. Sharma Allahabadwale as Sharma's boss
- 2011: Sanskaar Laxmi as Jugmohan Purohit
- 2011–12: Don't Worry Chachu as Popatlal Desai
- 2012: Yeh Zindagi Hai Gulshan
- 2012: Ek Kiran Roshni Ki as P.K. Khanna
- 2012–13: Alaxmi Ka Super Parivaar as Natwarlal Kapadia
- 2013: The Girl with the Indian Emerald (German) as Rajesh
- 2013: Pradhanmantri as Sheikh Abdullah
- 2013: Chhanchhan as Matilalbhai Borisagar
- 2014: Main Naa Bhoolungi as Mahanto Jagannath
- 2014: Chandrakant Chiplunkar Seedi Bambawala as Hasubhai Mehta
- 2014: Badi Door Se Aaye Hai as Judge (Cameo)
- 2015 Dilli Wali Thakur Gurls as Justice L.N Thakur
- 2015: Chalti Ka Naam Gaadi...Let's Go as Anil Ahuja
- 2016: Chidiya Ghar as Markati's father and Gadha Prasad's Father in law
- 2016: Khidki as Father of Nandini Tripathi
- 2018: Khichdi Returns as Tulsidas Parekh
- 2020: Shubharambh as Fufaji- Raja's paternal uncle and a lawyer by profession
- 2021: Vidrohi King as Badamba king naresh
- 2021: Mere Sai as Gajanand Kaka
- 2021: Bhabiji Ghar Par Hain! As Danny Sharma: Anita's loving and rich father who is an NRI based on America and hates Vibhuti because of their love marriage and his unemployment
- 2022: Shadyantra as Shivshankar Dubey
- 2023: Faltu as Brijmohan
- 2024: Murshid
- 2025 Mandala Murders as Giyasuddin Khan
