= Jamnadas Majethia =

Indian actor, director and producer (born 1966)

Jamnadas Majethia (JD)
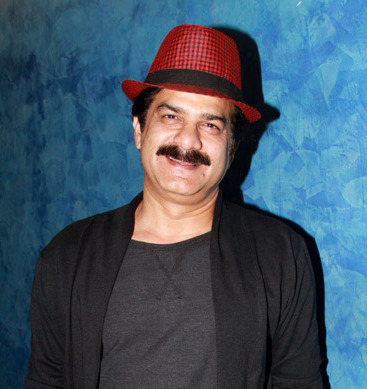
- Jamnadas Majethia in 2018
- Born: 5 February 1969 (age 57); Jam Salaya, Devbhumi Dwarka district (formerly Jamnagar district), Gujarat
- Other name: JD
- Occupations: Actor; Director; Producer
- Years active: 1989–present

Jamnadas "JD" Majethia (born 5 February 1969) is an Indian actor, director and producer. He is well known for his work in Gujarati and Hindi plays, dramas, serials and film. Having given successful cult shows like Badi Door Se Aaye Hain, Wagle Ki Duniya, Sarabhai vs Sarabhai, and Khichdi, he is a very successful showmaker. On stage, he has been active in Gujarati theater for the last 20 years. He formed a company Hats Off Productions. While he is usually associated with comic roles, he is also known to portray supporting characters to a certain extent.

He was nominated in 2011 for Apsara Award for Best Actor in a Comic Role for his role as Himanshu Seth in Khichdi: The Movie. In 2013, Majethia launched his acting academy, HatsOff Actors Studios.

== Personal life ==
Jamnadas Majethia was born on 5 February 1969 in a Gujarati Hindu family in Jam Salaya, Devbhoomi Dwarka, Gujarat.

Jamnadas is married to Nipa Majethia. They have two daughters, Kesar and Mishri.

== Films ==
Year	Titles	Role	Notes
1999	Dariya Chhoru	Chhoru	Gujarati-language film
1999	Khoobsurat	Mayur	
2010	Khichdi: The Movie	Himanshu Seth	Also producer
2023	Khichdi 2: Mission Paanthukistan	Himanshu Seth	Also producer

=== Television ===
Year	Titles	Role	Ref(s)
1991–1992	Chanakya	Malayketu	
2003–2004	Karishma Kaa Karishma	Paresh	
2003–2004	Khichdi	Himanshu Seth	
2005–2006	Instant Khichdi	Himanshu Seth	
2005–2010	Baa Bahoo Aur Baby	Dr. Harshad Thakkar	
2012	Survivor India	Contestant	
2016	Khidki	Host	
2017	Sarabhai vs Sarabhai Take 2	Prahlad	Guest
2018	Khichdi Returns	Himanshu Seth	
2023	Wagle Ki Duniya – Nayi Peedhi Naye Kissey	Himself	Guest
2025	Wagle Ki Duniya – Nayi Peedhi Naye Kissey	Govind	Guest

== Productions ==
Year	Titles
2002–2004	Khichdi
2003	Main Office Tere Angan Ki
2005	Instant Khichdi
2004–2006	Sarabhai vs Sarabhai
2004	Batliwala House No. 43
2005–2010	Baa Bahoo Aur Baby
2006	Resham Dankh
2007	Chalti Ka Naam Gaddi
2007–2008	Remote Control
2008–2009	Jasuben Jayantilaal Joshi Ki Joint Family
2008	Ek Packet Umeed
2008–2009	Shree
2009	Bhure Bhi Hum Bhaley Bhi Hum
2009–2010	Sukh By Chance
2010	Khichdi: The Movie
2010	Mera Naam Karegi Roshan
2010–2011	Behenein
2011	Mrs. Tendulkar
2011	Choti Si Zindagi
2011–2012	Chintu Chinky Aur Ek Badi Si Love Story
2011–2013	R. K. Laxman Ki Duniya
2012	Ek Doosre Se Karte Hain Pyaar Hum
2012	Byaah Hamari Bahoo Ka
2012	A Laxmi Hamari Super Bahu
2013–2015	Mahisagar
2013	Bh Se Bhade
2013	Madhuri Middle Class
2014–2016	Badi Door Se Aaye Hai
2016	Naya Mahisagar
2016	Khidki
2017	Sarabhai vs Sarabhai Take 2
2017	Bakula Bua Ka Bhoot
2018	Khichdi
2019–2020	Bhakharwadi
2021	Janani
2021–2025	Wagle Ki Duniya – Nayi Peedhi Naye Kissey
2022–present	Pushpa Impossible
2023	Happy Family: Conditions Apply
2024	Kuch Reet Jagat Ki Aisi Hai
2026	Chumbak
