= Badi Doooor Se Aaye Hai =

Indian TV series

- Genre: Science fantasy; Sitcom
- Created by: Jamnadas Majethia; Aatish Kapadia; Vipul D. Shah
- Directed by: Dhawala Shukla
- Starring: See below
- Country of origin: India
- Original language: Hindi
- No. of seasons: 1
- No. of episodes: 636

Production
- Producers: Jamnadas Majethia; Vipul D. Shah
- Production location: Mumbai
- Camera setup: Multi-camera
- Running time: 20 minutes
- Production company: Hats Off Productions

Original release
- Network: Sony SAB; SonyLIV
- Release: 9 June 2014 – 14 November 2016

Badi Dooooor Se Aaye Hain (transl. We've Come From Far Away) is an Indian television sitcom created by Vipul D. Shah and Jamnadas Majethia or Aatish Kapadia that aired on Sony SAB from 9 June 2014 to 14 November 2016.

== Plot ==
Badi Dooooor Se Aaye Hai is a story of an extraterrestrial family who come to Earth with an aim to find their eldest and lost son, named 2015, whom they have been searching for on many planets.

The spaceship of Alien family crashes in a jungle as they land on Earth. After landing, they are shocked to see human civilization and its form. Later they realize that if they move around in their alien form they will be treated differently or may be taken captive for research and analysis, thus risking their existence. But since they get very strong clues of their lost son 2015 to be living on Earth, they forcefully take the form of humans and secure their lives. The alien family consists of Vasant, his wife Varsha, his younger brother Sharad and two sons, Hemant and Shishir. The residents of Sunshine Colony are unique and funny in their own different ways. At first, they found it difficult to accept the Ghotalas because they are weird but slowly they treated them as their own seeing their kind and selfless nature. Sharad falls for Anna. Ghotala's tries to search for 2015 but fail various time. Due to their weirdness towards human customs, they get targeted by Sunshine Colony members. Later, the family learn that God has created their destiny for various special mission more than their hunt for their son 2015.

Firstly, they save Liza and Ronnie's daughter's life with Hemant's newly discovered superpower of healing. They later save Shishir's real human form from Bureau of Alien Investigation and Research (BAIR) who learns about Ghotala's real alien form but mistake them the real human form. Later, BAIR agents, Pritesh, and the scientist Rajender create hurdles and the alien family almost escapes from revealing their true form. Later, Lord asks the family to visit Runnotsav of Kutch where they rescue Murlidhar Ojha's long lost son Manav Ojha who was presumed to be dead. Manav now helps Ghotala whenever Sunshine colony members blame them for various situations. When Manav reveals his feelings for Anna, this starts a love triangle between Sharad, Anna and Manav.

During their stay on Earth, Dada 420 as Bharavi's grandfather's doppelgänger, Dadi 90 as Bharavi's grandmother's doppelgänger, Nani 555 as Urvashi Dholakia's doppelgänger, their daughter 333 visit the family on Hemant's invitation which also creates problems for the family.

On a trip, Pritesh fake's his illness and Ghotala's in an attempt to save his life, expose their superpowers. Due to this, the colony hates the family. Pritesh has a change of heart and convinces the colony to save Ghotala family for good.

Through much trouble the Ghotala family finds out their son 2015 has been held captive at an evil Alien's (1313) chamber, because he wanted him to repair Weather Controlling Machine, which is capable of destroying the Earth. Ghotala family defeats 1313 and got back their son and named him Samar. Now the Ghotalas decides to leave for their planet. As they are midway, they got the news of 2015's wife and son, on Earth. Due to this the Ghotala family crash-land on Earth one more time.

When Ghotalas meet Daulatram's (Samar's Father-in-law) he falls in love with Varsha at first sight and Varsha is smitten by him but he starts suspecting them. Anna and Sharad finally get married. Ghotala's now tires to convince Daulatram for the sake of Sonachandi and Maakhan. Sunshine colony members help the family in the process.After a series of events Sonachandi announces that she and 2015 are expecting another child. Vasant accidentally showcases his superpowers and Daulatram finds out that the Ghotala's are aliens. Afraid that Daulatram will expose their secret to the BAIR, Ghotalas decide to leave Earth immediately and move to their home planet, along with Daulatram's family. After some time they realize that they forgot Shishir and Maakhan at the Earth itself. Thus they decide to return to Earth, and crash lands on Earth for the third time. In the last scene of the show, Maakhan is shown thinking that now since the Ghotalas have been exposed to Daulatram, it would be more interesting to watch the Vasant-Daulatram clash.

== Cast ==
=== Main ===
- Sumeet Raghavan as Vasant Ghotala aka 9211 – Sharad's brother; Varsha's husband; Samar, Hemant, and Shishir's father; Maakhan's grandfather. He often commits mistakes. He always corrects Hemant/-426 for his error of language and hits him when he commits blunder. He always scolds Varsha for hitting on and flirting with Daulat Ram. His superpowers are Power Transfer, High Speed Rotation, Body to object transformation, and Magnetic Strength. (2014–2016)
- Rupali Bhosale as Varsha Ghotala aka 1721; Vasant's wife; Sharad's sister-in-law; Samar, Hemant, and Shishir's mother Maakhan's grandmother. She always adores Hemant for his smartness and gets angry when someone hits him. She is always corrected by Vasant when she uses wrong idioms. She has a big crush on Daulat Ram and always gets angered on Vasant for insulting Daulat Ram. Her superpowers are:- Extensibility and contractibility. (2014–2016)
- Vinay Rohrra as Sharad Ghotala aka 87 square – Vasant's brother, Anna's husband; Samar, Hemant, and Shishir's uncle. He develops a crush on Anna. When Anna praises him, he often says "Ya Ya Ya..." His catchphrase is "Logically..." He gets upset when Anna leaves for Goa right after their marriage. His superpowers are:- Telepathy, Hynotising, Mind Reading and Body transformation. (2014–2016)
- Bhavna Khatri as Anna D'Souza Ghotala – Ronnie's sister Sharad's wife. She was raised by Liza and Ronnie. She is fluent in many languages and customs. She always helps Ghotala with advice during human function. She always says, "I don't believe this" when someone commits a blunder. She earlier had confused feelings between Manav and Sharad but later chose Sharad when Manav was too revealed to be Alien. (2014–2016)
- Amit Dolawat as Samar Ghotala aka 2015 – Vasant and Varsha's eldest son; Hemant and Shishir's brother; Sonachandi's husband; Maakhan's father. He adores Sonachandi a lot and always gets romantic with her. He shakes his hands when he tries to lie. He was captured by 1313. His superpowers are Far-sight seeing. (2016)
- Punit Talreja as Hemant Ghotala aka -426 – Vasant and Varsha's second son; Samar and Shishir's brother; Heeramoti's fiancé; He is a little dumb but has a big heart. His superpowers are:- Healing and invisibility and handi-craft making. (2014–2016)
- Sujay Bagwe as Shishir Ghotala aka 225 – Vasant and Varsha's youngest son; Samar and Hemant's brother He is cute and helpful and clever. He has storage of information about humans and helps the family in the time of needs. His superpowers are Live Capture and Video player. (2014–2016)
- Vindhya Tiwari as Sonachandi Yadav Ghotala – Daulat's elder daughter; Heeramoti's sister; Samar's wife; Maakhan's mother. She respects Vasant and Varsha and would even go against her father for them. She too adores Samar a lot and always gets romantic with him. She is quite dumb and has horrible cooking skills. (2016)
- Prema Mehta as Heeramoti Yadav – Daulat's younger daughter; Sonachandi's sister; Hemant's fiancé. She is dumb as Hemant and Bhairavi and asks questions after every statement. (2016)
- Rajesh Kumar as Daulat Ram Yadav – Sonachandi and Heeramoti's father; Maakhan's grandfather. He owns a dairy farm and fond of milk and milk products and recites their examples. He always taunts Vasant and adores women and respects them. He is in love with Varsha and envies Vasant. He wants her and tries to separate by making Varsha believe that Vasant is having an affair with Svetlana His Boss so that he can have both Maakhan and Varsha. (2016)
- Runav Shah as Maakhan Ghotala – Samar and Sonachandi's son. He has powers of communication and object control. He always contacts his parents and grandparents and others for communication. (2016)

=== Recurring ===
- Purvi Vyas as Bhavana Trivedi Bhatt – Ila's sister; Bhadresh's mother; Pritesh and Mitesh's grandmother. She is native to Gujarat. She always scolds Bhadresh for his unemployment and Bhairavi for her mistakes. She always taunts Ghotala family and Ojha's but also cares for them a lot. She often replies "Haa Baba" when someone calls "Kaa Baa?" (2014–2016)
- Krunal Pandit as Bhadresh Bhatt – Bhavana's son; Bhairavi's husband; Mitesh and Pritesh's father. He is unemployed and likes to rest all the time. Bhavna, Ronnie and Murlidhar taunt upon his unemployment. He often replies Haa Baa when she calls Kaa Baba ?(2014-2016)
- Shruti Rawat as Bhairavi Bhatt – Bhadresh's wife; Mitesh and Pritesh's mother. She is dumb and considers Hemant as her brother due to similarity in thoughts. She knew Ghotala's secret from Day 1 but never revealed. She always commits blunder when work told by Bhavna but always proves other wrong. She has the catchphrase "To Barobar". (2014–2016)
- Sneh V. Mirani as Mitesh Bhatt – Bhadresh and Bhairavi's elder son; Pritesh's brother. He always helps Pritesh in his plan against Ghotala's but guides him when he creates differences between the colony. (2014–2016)
- Aryan Prajapati as Pritesh Bhatt – Bhadresh and Bhairavi's younger son; Mitesh's brother. He always makes attempts to expose the alien family but always makes mistakes in the process. He even guides the scientists and BAIR agents to expose Ghotalas. (2014–2016)
- Falguni Rajani as Ila Trivedi Mehta – Bhavna's sister. She always fakes her call-connections with high personalities and celebrities. (2014–2016)
- Pradeep Duhan as
  - Captain Manav Murlidhar Ojha – Murlidhar and Lajwanti's son. He had crush on Anna. He was sacrificed while serving the nation. (2014)
  - 100÷100=1/ Manav – High Command's son; Murlidhar and Lajwanti's adopted son. While gaining Manav's memory, he also gains his emotions. He also develops true feelings for Anna creating confusion in their love life. He later continued to stay with Ojha family for the sake of their happiness. He always helps the Ghotala family against Sunshine Colony members allegations. (2015-2016)
- Deepak Pareek as Murlidhar Ojha – Lajwanti's husband; Manav's father. He is Dandy towards beautiful women. He kept a secret about his son's death from his wife. He is a miser and always asks for offers, gifts and money. He is a proud Marwari and always tries to promote Rajasthan. (2014–2016)
- Neelam Pathania as Lajwanti "Laajo" Ojha – Ramdulari's sister; Murlindhar's wife; Manav's mother. She is a housewife and has immense love for her son. She also berates Murlidhar when he adores other women. (2014–2016)
- Rahul Singh as Chandrabhan Yadav – Lajwanti and Murlidhar's brother-in-law. He pens worse poems with the meanings and words he wrote the poem for. He agrees with his wife Ramdulari with her wrong English. (2015–2016)
- Anuradha Verma as Ramdulari Yadav – Lajwanti's sister. She speaks wrong English. She is Lajwanti's sister. She always agrees with Chandrabhan's poems and Bhairavi's wrong logic. She is referred to as Bhojpuri Queen Victoria. (2015–2016)
- Bakhtiyaar Irani as Ronnie D'Souza – Anna's brother; Liza's husband; Angel's father. He always find difficulties in speaking Hindi. He is impulsive and hotheaded. He also adores other ladies. He sacrificed his parenthood along with Liza with Angel for his younger sister Anna. (2014–2016)
- Tannaz Irani as Lisa D'Souza – Ronnie's wife; Angel's mother. She always asks Ronnie to keep calm. She always corrects Ronnie with Hindi. She is mother like figure to Anna. She along with Ronnie sacrificed her parenthood with Angel for her sister-in-law Anna. She guides Anna during her love conflict. (2014–2016)
- Sara Abdi as Angel D'Souza – Ronnie and Liza's daughter. She was born with a disorder. When she was about to die, she was revived by Hemant with his healing powers. (2014–2015)
- Balvinder Singh Suri as Inspector Sweety Singh. He is the colony inspector. He is always annoyed by the colony members and mostly Ghotala's. (2014–2016)
- Jayshree Mehta as Dolly. She is the wicked aunt of the colony. She has a crush on the men of the colony and tries to woo them. (2014–2015)
- Mukesh Ramani as Watchman Khadak Singh. He modern and up-to-date. He uses smartphones and Internet for the work assigned by the colony residents. (2014–2015)
- Vandana Pathak as Peas Ghotala aka 90 – Vasant and Sharad's grandmother; Samar, Hemant, and Shishir’s great-grandmother. She is Bhairavi's grandmother's doppelgänger. She has hearing issues and transforms into a young lady. (2015)
- Urvashi Dholakia as
  - Urvashi aka 555 – Varsha's mother, She always taunts Vasant and Sharad and tries to troubles them. She downloads everyone's accents and communicates with them. She adores Hemant and devises plan to insult Vasant in front of Varsha. (2015)
  - Fake Dr. Kameshwari Prempipasu (2015)
- Jia as Padmavati Devi. She along with Prithesh try to expose the alien family. She hates when she is called only Padmavati and not Padmavati Devi. (2015)
- Dipesh Shah as Charles Ghotala aka 420 – Peas's husband; Vasant and Sharad's grandfather; Samar, Hemant, and Shishir’s great-grandfather. He is Bhairavi's grandfather's doppelgänger. He has issues with hearing. He later transformed into a dog in front of the colony members. (2015)
- Abhishek Verma as Jackie/1947. He along with 2015 landed on Earth. (2015)
- Karan Thakur as Scientist Rajinder Singh. He is on a search for the aliens. He is always guided by Pritesh in the same. (2014–2015)
- Ankit Gera as Yuvraaj Chaudhary, Senior BAIR agent, Agent Q and Agent X's boss. He wants to attain alien superpowers. (2014)
- Surjit Saha as BAIR agent Q. He is quite dumb. He agrees with anything and everything and hence commits blunder for his organisation. He is also referred as Pinky by Kumkum Balkukreti aka KuKu. (2014–2016)
- Krupa Shah as BAIR agent X. She always taunts and rebukes Agent Q for his blunders. (2014–2016)
- Sharika Raina as 2/2, Samar's alien fiancé, She took the human form of Bahu Meri Beti Nahin Samdhan Dahej Deti Nahi vamp. (2016)
- Rakesh Paul as Dr. Jayant Dikshit/1313, he captured 2015 and tortured him. He has captured various planets. He wants to rule Earth with the help of Weather Control Machine. He is in love with Varsha's Real Form.(Main Antagonist) (2016)
- Farzil Pardiwalla as 1600+, 1313's helper. (2016)
- Rhea Sharma as Priyanka Prabhakar Datar (2014)
- Sangram Singh as Armaan Kumar (2015)
- Atul Parchure as Bhoot Bhaiya Ghost Prabhakar. He was killed by his family members. He seeks Sharad's and Ghotala's help to save her daughter from the clutches of his evil family and imprison them. (2015)
- Abraam Pandey as Ketan, Daulatram's sidekick. (2016)
- Sharad Vyas as Harvinod Bhai (2015)
- Rajeev Mehta as Don Ramesh. He is Don of Mumbai who steals jewelry. He suffers short-term memory loss frequently. He kidnapped Bhairavi, when his henchmen saw Vasant disguised as Bhairavi using superpowers. (2015)
- Jaswinder Gardner as Kumkum Balakukreti. A secret government agent. She is also Agent Q's best friend. (2015)
- Varun Khandelwal as Captain Iqbaal of Pakistan. (2015)
- Aditi Gowitrikar as Vidya Mandodre. She is an evil lady with criminal background. She troubled the Sunshine colony during 2015 Ganapati Utsav but later turns good towards them when they save her in an asthma attack. (2015)
- Giaa Manek as Shanti Roy (2015)
- Navina Bole as Nisha(alias Nisha Ahaha Ahaha), Ronnie's ex-girlfriend. Ronnie broke up with her when she criticised Ronnie's love and respect for Indian culture. (2015)
- Dinyar Contractor as boss of Rajinder Singh (2014)
- Sukesh Anand as Vinod, PA of Vidya Mandodore (2015)
- Monica Castelino as Pushpagandha Puryakusthu, Ronnie and Hemant's Hindi Teacher. She is referred to as Gandapushpa by Ronnie. (2015)
- Abraam Pandey as Ketan Akka Aadhey Adhurey (2016)
- Sameksha as Toffee Raheja (2015)
- Pariva Pranati as Premlata, Vasant's fake wife. She lost touch with her husband who is Vasant's look-alike. (2016)
- Dilnaz Irani as Laxmi, Vasant's fake sister. Vasant used Sharad's transformation superpowers to change into Laxmi in order to get Samar, Sonachandi and Maakhan along with Ghotala family. She was Daulatram's love interest. (2016)
- Chirag Desai as 212, 2015's sidekick. He along with Jackie/1947 and Samar/2015. (2016)

=== Guest ===
- Akshay Kumar as himself, to promote their film Entertainment (2014)
- Krushna Abhishek as himself, to promote their film Entertainment (2014)
- Deven Bhojani as Defence Lawyer Jugal Raichura (2015)
- Nimisha Vakharia as Prosecutor Neelima Jugal Raichura (2015)
- Anang Desai as Judge Desai (2015)
- Manav Gohil as Yamraj from Yam Hain Hum. He came to take Hemant's life but left him back to Earth when he saw Ghotala's innocence and philanthropist nature. (2015)
- Rishi Kapoor as himself, to promote their film All Is Well (2015)
- Abhishek Bachchan as himself, to promote their film All Is Well (2015)
- Aditi Govitrikar as Vidya Mandodre (2015)
- Emraan Hashmi as himself, to promote Azhar (2016)

== See also ==
- List of Hindi comedy shows
