= Paresh Ganatra =

Indian television, stage and film actor (born 1965)

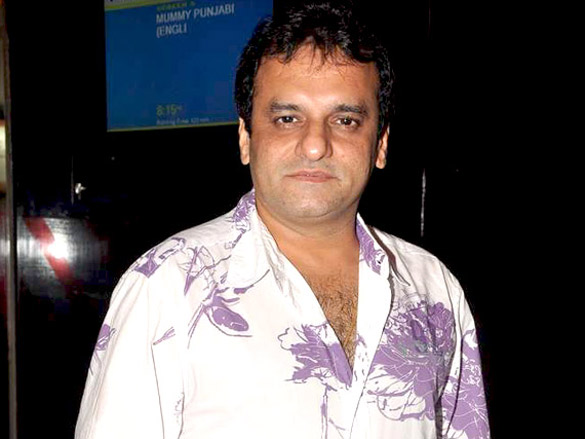
- Born: 19 February 1965 (age 61); Mumbai, Maharashtra, India
- Occupation: Actor • Comedian • Producer • Theatre Artist
- Years active: 1982–present

Paresh Ganatra (born 19 February 1965) is an Indian television, stage and film actor. He is known for his role as Praveen Thakkar in the Star Plus comedy series Baa Bahu Aur Baby (2005–2010), SAB TV's sitcom Chidiya Ghar and films like No Entry (2005), Rowdy Rathore (2012) amongst others.

== Early life and education ==
Paresh Ganatra was born on 19 February 1965 in a Gujarati household in Mumbai, India, where he was brought up. He did his schooling from Lions Juhu High School in 1981. Thereafter he graduated from Narsee Monjee College of Commerce and Economics in 1986, and joined Management studies at Somaiya College, Mumbai.

== Career ==
Participating in theatre while still in college, he started his acting career with Gujarati theatre in the city from 1984 to 1992. He made his film debut with a role in Mann in 1999. He acted in TV series Ek Mahal Ho Sapnon Ka, a Colonial Cousins music video, TV commercials (including Symphony Air Coolers, Tata Phones, Coffee Bite, LG TV, Nerolac, Dabur and McDonald's), when he reached fame with the 2002 multi-star hit film Aankhen.

From then on, he has been active in Bollywood. He is known for his comic roles in comedic films, including No Entry, Welcome, Money Hai Toh Honey Hai and Delhi Belly amongst others. Rowdy Rathore, in which Paresh played a supporting role with Akshay Kumar, became a milestone for him as it succeeded at the box office. He worked in the comedy film, Bol Bachchan, starring Ajay Devgn, Abhishek Bachchan, Asin Thottumkal, Prachi Desai and directed by Rohit Shetty.

== Filmography ==
- Mann (1999)
- Kai Zhala (2001)
- Aankhen (2002)
- No Entry (2005)
- Dil Diya Hai (2006)
- Welcome (2007)
- Money Hai Toh Honey Hai (2008)
- Khallballi: Fun Unlimited (2008)
- Khichdi: The Movie (2010)
- No Problem (2010)
- Delhi Belly (2011)
- Rowdy Rathore (2012)
- Main Krishna Hoon (2013)
- Shree (2013)
- Ramaiya Vastavaiya (2013)
- Freaky Ali (2016)
- Yamla Pagla Deewana Phir se (2018)
- Dabangg 3 (2019)
- Khichdi 2: Mission Paanthukistan (2023)

As a Producer

- Threesome (2018)

=== Television ===
Year	Serial	Role	Notes
1999–2002	Ek Mahal Ho Sapno Ka	Dheeraj Rajguru	
2005	CID Special Bureau	Ganshu	Episode "The Case Of The Surprised Return Part 4"
2005–2010	Baa Bahoo Aur Baby	Praveen Thakkar	
2008–2009	Jasuben Jayantilaal Joshi Ki Joint Family	Purushottam Thakkar	
2009–2010	Comedy Circus	Contestant	
2009	Sajan Re Jhoot Mat Bolo	Natwarlal	
2011–2017	Chidiya Ghar	Ticket Collector Ghotak Narayan	
2013–2016	Comedy Nights with Kapil	Various characters	
2014	Samvidhaan: The Making of the Constitution of India	Prof. K. T. Shah	
2016–2017	The Kapil Sharma Show	Various characters	
2018	Khichdi	Advocate	Episodic role
2019–2020	Bhakharwadi	Mahendra Thakkar	
2020	Scam 1992	Maheshwari	
2022	The Great Weddings of Munnes	Phatte Phupha	
2023	Happy Family: Conditions Apply	Dr. Jatin Kumar	
2024	Aapka Apna Zakir	Himself	
2025	Wagle Ki Duniya – Nayi Peedhi Naye Kissey	Himanshu, Deepanshu and Dr. Sudhanshu	
2026	The Great Indian Kapil Show	Paparazzi	Episode 44
2026	Made In India: A Titan Story	Ravindra/Devendra naik	

== Awards and nominations ==
Year	Awards	Category	Work	Result
2007	Indian Television Academy Awards	Best Supporting Actor – Male	Baa Bahoo Aur Baby	Won
2012	Indian Telly Awards	Best Actor in a Comic Role	Chidiya Ghar	Nominated
2015	Indian Telly Awards	Best Actor in a Supporting Role (Comedy)	Chidiya Ghar	Nominated
