= Gireesh Sahdev =

Indian television actor

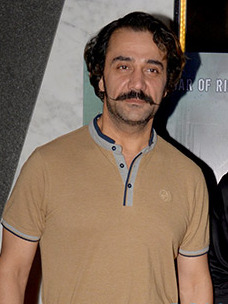
- Sahdev in 2007
- Occupation: Actor
- Years active: 1998–present
- Relatives: Piyush Sahdev (brother); Meher Vij (sister)

Gireesh Sahdev is an Indian film and television actor who appears in Hindi films and television serials. He is best known for his roles in the serials Best of Luck Nikki, Navya..Naye Dhadkan Naye Sawaal, Ardhangini – Ek Khoobsurat Jeevan Saathi, Aladdin - Naam Toh Suna Hoga and Instant Khichdi. He has also appeared as a supporting actor in several films including Jab Tak Hai Jaan, Dabangg 2 and Khichdi: The Movie. His brother Piyush Sahdev and sister Meher Vij are also actors.

== Personal life ==
Gireesh Sahdev's brother Piyush, sister Meher and brother-in-law Manav Vij are also actors.

== Filmography ==
=== Film ===
Year	Title	Role	Notes	Ref(s)
2007	Return of Hanuman	Professor Antariksh	Voiceover	
2008	Ghatothkach	Kantakasur	Voiceover	
2010	Khichdi: The Movie	Parminder		
2012	Dabangg 2	Inspector Siddique		
2012	Jab Tak Hai Jaan	Captain Jagdeep Deewan		
2012	Thuppakki	Police Inspector	Tamil film	
2013	Ramaiya Vastavaiya			
2013	Satyagraha			
2013	Goliyon Ki Raasleela Ram-Leela			
2014	Manjunath	Jai		
2014	Holiday	ACP Ashok Gaikwad		
2014	Ungli	Inspector Dighe		
2015	Ramta Jogi	Charan	Punjabi-language film	
2016	Rustom	Lieutenant commander Pujari		
2019	72 Hours: Martyr Who Never Died	Company Commander Sher Singh		
2020	Guns of Banaras	STF Officer		
2025	Romeo S3	Bala		

=== Television ===
Year	Title	Role	Notes
2002	1857 Kranti	William Bentinck	
2003–2004	Khichdi	Parminder	
2005	Instant Khichdi	Parminder	
2005	Sarabhai vs Sarabhai	Jugal Kishore/Surjit Singh Suri/Parminder	
2006–2007	Solhah Singaarr	Yashvardhan Bharadwaj	
2007–2008	Ardhangini – Ek Khoobsurat Jeevan Saathi	Harish Bhattacharya	
2008	Miley Jab Hum Tum	Ravi Bhushan	
2011–2012	Navya..Naye Dhadkan Naye Sawaal	Deepak Mishra	
2011–2016	Best of Luck Nikki	Avatar Singh	
2014–2015	Shastri Sisters	Surender Sareen	
2015	Goldie Ahuja Matric Pass	Avtar Singh	Crossover episode with Best of Luck Nikki
2017	Pehredaar Piya Ki	Sajjan Singh	
2017–2018	Saam Daam Dand Bhed	Pankaj Chaudhary	
2018	Zindagi Ke Crossroads		
2018–2019	Dastaan-E-Mohabbat Salim Anarkali	Maan Singh	
2018–2020	Aladdin - Naam Toh Suna Hoga	Mohammad Omar	
2019	Divya Drishti	Chetan Shergill	
2019	Paramavatar Shri Krishna	Maharaj Bali	
2021	Dev DD	Mamaji	
2021	The Empire	Baisangar	
2021–2025	The Legend of Hanuman	Vibhishana (voice)	
2022	Crime Patrol	S.H.O. Ajit Singh	
2022	Bravehearts: The Untold Stories of Heroes	Balram	
2022–2023	Katha Ankahee	Kailash Garewal	
2023–2024	Vanshaj	Dhanraj Mahajan	
2026	Taara	Vikram Shekhawat	

== Dubbing roles ==
=== Animated films ===
Film title	Original Voice(s)	Character	Dub Language	Original Language	Original Year Release	Dub Year Release	Notes
Beauty and the Beast	Richard White	Gaston	Hindi	English	1991	2009	

=== Live-Action films ===
Film title	Original Voice(s)	Character	Dub Language	Original Language	Original Year Release	Dub Year Release	Notes
Superman	Nathan Fillion	Green Lantern Guy Gardner	Hindi	English	11 July 2025	11 July 2025	Streaming on Amazon Prime Video and JioHotstar
