= Jay Chhaniyara =

Indian stand-up comedian

- Born: 22 October 1993 (age 32); Rajkot, Gujarat, India

Comedy career
- Genre: stand-up comedy

Jay Chhaniyara (born 22 October 1993) is an Indian stand-up comedian. A performer since the age of six, he came to public attention following appearances on Star One's The Great Indian Laughter Challenge. He has also performed on Zee TV in Aashayein, and on SAB TV longest show Taarak Mehta Ka Ooltah Chashmah in 2011 during Gokuldham Khel Mahotsav. Chhaniyara was diagnosed with cerebral palsy at an early age.

== Early life ==
Jay Chhaniyara was born in Rajkot, Gujarat. His father is a retired government servant in water supply board, His mother is a housewife. He has an elder brother named Ravi.

== Career ==
Chhaniyara started to perform to his family as a child to deal with the pain of operations. His parents arranged for him to perform publicly during the Gujarati festival of Navratra. The audiences were enthralled and there was a standing ovation for him.
