= Khichdi 2: Mission Paanthukistan =

2023 Indian comedy film

- Theatrical release poster
- Directed by: Aatish Kapadia
- Written by: Aatish Kapadia
- Produced by: Vineet Jain; Jamnadas Majethia
- Starring: Supriya Pathak Kapur; Rajeev Mehta; Anang Desai; Vandana Pathak; Jamnadas Majethia; Kirti Kulhari
- Cinematography: Vijay Soni
- Edited by: Aajay K.
- Music by: Songs: Chirantan Bhatt; Background Score: Raju Singh
- Production company: Hats Off Productions
- Distributed by: Zee Studios
- Release date: 17 November 2023
- Running time: 122 minutes
- Country: India
- Language: Hindi
- Box office: ₹5.65 crore

Khichdi 2: Mission Paanthukistan (Note: Paanthukistan (lit. 'paan spitstan') being a fictional desert country neighboring India.) (Hindi pronunciation: [kʰɪt͡ʃ.ɽiː ʈuː mɪʃn pə̃tʰuːkɪstaːn]) is a 2023 Indian Hindi-language comedy film written and directed by Aatish Kapadia, and produced by Vineet Jain and Jamnadas Majethia. The film stars Supriya Pathak Kapur, Rajeev Mehta, Anang Desai, Vandana Pathak, Jamnadas Majethia. It is the fifth overall installment of the Khichdi franchise, and a direct sequel to the 2010 film Khichdi: The Movie.

== Cast ==
- Supriya Pathak Kapur as Hansa Praful Parekh
- Rajeev Mehta as Praful Tulsidas Parekh and Imam Kha Ke Thuk (double role)
- Anang Desai as Tulsidas Parekh (Babuji)
- Vandana Pathak as Jayshree Bharat Parekh
- Jamnadas Majethia as Himanshu Chandrakant Sheth
- Kirti Kulhari as Parminder Kaur Sheth, Himanshu's wife
- Anant Vidhaat Sharma as Kushal, TIA (Thodi Intelligent Agency) agent
- Reyaansh Vir Chadha as Wazir
- Flora Saini as Rani Gulkanda
- Shivika Rishi as Chakki
- Arisht Jain as Jacky
- Harry Josh as Tambaku
- Pratik Gandhi as Pilot (Special appearance)
- Farah Khan as herself (Special appearance)
- Kiku Sharda as Robot (Special appearance)
- Paresh Ganatra as Makhanwala (Special appearance)

== Production ==
=== Development ===
The success and positive feedback of the 2010 film after its telecast on television encouraged Aatish Kapadia to start working on a sequel. In 2017, the producer of the film, Jamnadas Majethia, confirmed the sequel to Khichdi: The Movie was in the works. In February 2023, Kirti Kulhari announced the sequel to "Khichdi: The Film" was in production.

=== Casting ===
Supriya Pathak, Jamnadas Majhetia, Anang Desai, Rajeev Mehta, and Kirti Kulhari will reprise their roles, while Vandana Pathak will return to her role of Jayshree, after previously being replaced by Nimisha Vakharia in the first film. Furthermore, Farah Khan, Anant Vidhaat, Pratik Gandhi, Paresh Ganatra, Kiku Sharda, and Flora Saini will make special appearances in the film.

=== Filming ===
In February 2023, Kirti Kulhari announced that the filming of the film is already started in Mumbai.

== Release ==
=== Theatrical ===
The film was released on 17 November 2023.

=== Home media ===
The film premiered on ZEE5 from 9 February 2024.

== Critical response ==
Shubhra Gupta of The Indian Express gave the film 1 out of 5, writing, "Why did this ultra-loud, blindingly colour-coordinated bunch who did nothing of any consequence in the first movie, bother to circle back for a sequel?"

Deepa Gahlot of Rediff.com gave the film 2 out of 5, calling the production values as "shoddy" and the plot "incoherent." Agnivo Niyogi of The Telegraph India criticised the screenplay and "focus on several subplots", writing, "Khichdi 2: Mission Paanthukistan struggles to create the kind of comedic moments that were the hallmark of the original TV serial."

A critic from Bollywood Hungama rated the film 2.5/5 stars and wrote "Khichdi 2 suffers from a weak second half and an unimaginative script."
