= Khichdi: The Movie =

2010 Indian comedy movie

- Theatrical release poster
- Directed by: Aatish Kapadia
- Story by: Aatish Kapadia
- Based on: Khichdi and Instant Khichdi by Aatish Kapadia
- Produced by: Jamnadas Majethia
- Starring: Supriya Pathak; Anang Desai; Rajeev Mehta; Jamnadas Majethia; Nimisha Vakharia
- Narrated by: Kesar Majethia; Markand Soni
- Cinematography: Sanjay Jadhav
- Edited by: Hemal Kothari
- Music by: Raju Singh
- Production company: Hats Off Productions
- Distributed by: Fox Star Studios
- Release date: 1 October 2010
- Running time: 120 minutes
- Country: India
- Language: Hindi
- Budget: ₹4.5 crore
- Box office: ₹8.1 crore

Khichdi: The Movie (Hindi pronunciation: [kʰɪt͡ʃ.ɽiː]) is a 2010 Indian comedy film, written and directed by Aatish Kapadia. It is the first film by Hats Off Productions and stars Anang Desai, Supriya Pathak, Rajeev Mehta, Nimisha Vakharia and Jamnadas Majethia in the lead roles. The film was a moderate commercial success.

The film is based on the STAR India's Khichdi franchise. It is also the first film in the history of Hindi cinema to be based on a television series.

== Plot ==
Two kids, Jacky and Chakki, narrate the story of their family at a summer camp.

The god of knowledge, Ishwar Buddhidev, visits the Parekh family, consisting of the elder Babuji, his eldest son Praful, Praful's wife Hansa, Hansa's brother Himanshu, Praful's little brother's widow Jayshree, Hansa and Praful's daughter Chakki, and Jayshree's son Jacky. The Parekhs drive the god crazy and he runs back to heaven.

The Parekhs are informed that Hansa and Himanshu's father is on his deathbed. Before dying he states that his last wish is to fulfill Himanshu's dream. Himanshu reveals that his dream is to have a legendary marriage. But after getting rejected by hundreds of brides, he falls in love with their neighbour's daughter Parminder Kaur. The two get engaged. On the day of the wedding, Himanshu realises that his marriage is not legendary, as it lacks thrill and adventure. The Parekhs stall the wedding and try to turn the Parminders against Himanshu so the two get broken up and then have a legendary reunion.

The Parekhs decide to rob Parminder's close friend Chakku Singh's house, but they discover that Chakku has been murdered and the police arrest Himanshu as the suspect. Parminder's brother breaks the marriage but it is revealed that Parminder is marrying another groom tomorrow. During the court hearing, it is revealed that Chakku is alive and confesses that he committed suicide and Himanshu is released.

The Parekhs rush to Parminder's wedding. Parminder's brother sees the news and happily accepts Himanshu as his brother-in-law.

== Cast ==
- Anang Desai as Tulsidas Parekh a.k.a. Babuji: Praful and Bharat's father; Hansa and Jayshree's father-in-law; Jackky and Chakki's grandfather.
- Rajeev Mehta as Praful Tulsidas Parekh: Tulsidas' elder son; Hansa's husband; Jayshree's brother-in-law; Chakki's father.
- Supriya Pathak as Hansa Praful Parekh(née Seth): Chandrakant's daughter; Himanshu's elder sister; Praful's wife; Jayshree's sister-in-law; Chakki's mother.
- Jamnadas Majethia as Himanshu Chandrakant Seth: Chandrakant's son; Hansa's brother; Praful's brother- in-law; Chakki's uncle.
- Nimisha Vakharia as Jayshree Parekh: Bharat's widow; Jackky's mother; Tulsidas' daughter-in-law; Praful and Hansa's sister-in-law.
- Kirti Kulhari as Parminder “Pammi” Kaur / Laado Rani (Himanshu's love interest)
- Gireesh Sahedev as Parminder Singh, Pammi's brother
- Farah Khan as herself (cameo) – special appearance
- Arvind Vaidya as Chandrakant "Chandu" Seth, Himanshu and Hansa's father
- Dinyar Contractor as Judge
- Satish Shah as Ishwar Buddhidev (cameo)
- Deven Bhojani as hospital patient (cameo)
- Paresh Ganatra as Advocate Pandit (cameo)
- Kesar Majethia as Chakki Praful Parekh (narrator)
- Markand Soni as Jackky Bharat Parekh (narrator)
- Neel Patel as School Kid #1
- Juhi Rangpariya as School Kid #2
- Neil Jaysinghania as School Kid #3
- Anuj Gupta as Police Inspector
- Tina Parekh as Margaret “Maggie” D'Silva

== Release ==
The film released on 1 October 2010 and became the first Indian television series to be adapted into a film. The film faced stiff competition from films Anjaana Anjaani and the Hindi-dubbed version of Enthiran (Robot), and its performance at the box office was subsequently termed a hit.

== Awards and nominations ==
6th Apsara Film & Television Producers Guild Awards

- Nominated:
  Producers Guild Film Award for Best Actor in a Comic Role — Jamnadas Majethia

2011 Zee Cine Awards

- Nominated:
  Zee Cine Award for Best Actor in a Comic Role — Jamnadas Majethia

56th Filmfare Awards

- Nominated
  Filmfare Award for Best Supporting Actress— Supriya Pathak

== Sequel ==
A sequel titled Khichdi 2: Mission Paanthukistan was released on 17 November 2023.
