= Rajesh Kumar (actor) =

Indian actor

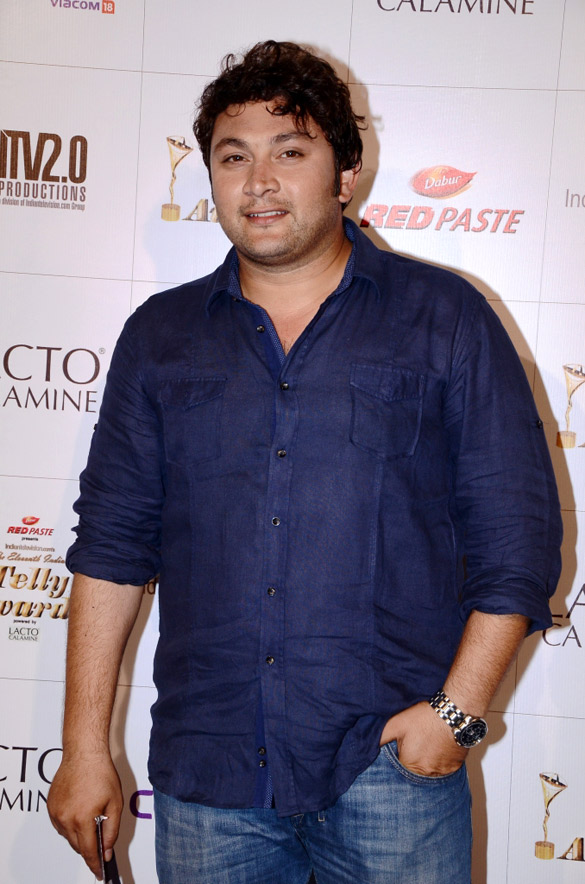
- Kumar at the Colors Indian Telly Awards, 2012
- Born: Gaya, Bihar, India
- Occupations: Actor, Producer
- Years active: 1999–present
- Spouse: Madhavi Chopra (m. 2004)

Rajesh Kumar is an Indian actor and producer, best known for his roles in Indian television shows such as Baa Bahoo Aur Baby and Sarabhai vs Sarabhai. Rajesh is an alumnus of Hindu College, University of Delhi. He quit acting and at the age of 41, he took up farming as a profession as, according to him, that served for the greater purpose for life. He has since returned to acting.

== Personal life ==
Rajesh Kumar resides in Mumbai with his family. His ancestral home is in Gaya District, Bihar. He married Madhavi Chopra in 2004.

== Filmography ==
=== Television ===
Year	Series	Role	Notes
1999–2001	Ek Mahal Ho Sapno Ka	Rishabh	
2000–2001	Ghar Ek Mandir	Vilas	
2001–2003	Kkusum	Shashank Deshmukh	
2001–2003	Des Mein Niklla Hoga Chand	Narendra Singh	
2001–2003	Shikwah		
2001–2002	Kaun Apna Kaun Paraya		
2002	Krishna Arjun		
2004	Shararat	Sheyro Jungliani	Guest
2004–2006; 2017	Sarabhai vs Sarabhai	Rosesh Sarabhai	
2005	CID Special Bureau	Raghav	Episode: Murder In Trance Part I & II
2005–2010	Baa Bahoo Aur Baby	Narrator/Subodh Labshankar Thakkar	
2006–2007	Kulvaddhu	Jaswant Singh Rathore	
2007	Durgesh Nandinii	Dheeraj	
2007	Comedy Circus	Contestant	
2008–2009	Comedy Circus Kaante Ki Takkar	Contestant	Winner with Swapnil Joshi, V.I.P. and Rajiv Nigam
2008	Ek Packet Umeed	Gudiya's groom	Episode 2
2009	Bhootwala Serial	Vicky	
2010–2011	Mrs. & Mr. Sharma Allahabadwale	Dishtdumn Sharma	
2011–2012	Chintu Chinki Aur Ek Badi Si Love Story	Chintu Dwivedi	Also producer
2012	Arjun-Har Yug Me Aayega Ek	Pathan Lala	
2012	Lakhon Mein Ek	Mahesh	Episode ″Venkatlaxmi″
2012	Bhai Bhaiya Aur Brother	Chaman	
2012	Bhoot Raja aur Ronnie	Raja/ Bhoot Raja	Television film
2013	Time Out with Imam	Himself	
2014	Pritam Pyare Aur Woh	Dara Koyla	
2014	Tu Mere Agal Bagal Hai	Lal Sing	
2014	Bhoot Raja aur Ronnie 2	Raja/ Bhoot Raja	Television film Sequel to 2012 film
2015	Zindagi Khatti Meethi	Diptiman Roy Chowdhury	
2015–2016	Neeli Chatri Waale	Bhagwan Das Chaubey	
2015–2016	Yam Kisi Se Kam Nahin	Yam Raj	
2016–2017	Badi Door Se Aaye Hai	Daulat Ram Yadav	
2017	TV, Biwi aur Main	Jijaji	
2017	Comedy Dangal	Various characters	
2018	Belan Wali Bahu	Mahesh	
2018	Khichdi	Ravan	Guest
2018	Hamari Bahu Silk	Kapadia	
2019	Apna News Aayega	Various characters	
2020	Maharaj Ki Jai Ho!	King Suryabhan	
2020	Excuse Me Maadam	Sanam Harjaayi	
2020	Bhalla Calling Bhalla	Rajesh Bhalla	
2021–2024	Kota Factory	Gagan Rastogi	
2023–2024	Yeh Meri Family	Sanjay Awasthi	
2023	Rana Naidu		
2024	Freedom at Midnight	Liaquat Ali Khan	
2024	Khet Khet Mein	Host/presenter	

=== Films ===
Year	Title	Role	Notes
2011	Men Will Be Men	Preet	
2014	Super Nani	Suketu	
2019	Student of the Year 2	Prem Narayan Sachdev	
2023	Haddi	Satto	
2024	Teri Baaton Mein Aisa Uljha Jiya	Mama	
2024	Rautu Ka Raaz	Naresh Prabhakar Dimri	ZEE5 film
2024	Binny And Family	Vinay Singh	
2025	Saiyaara	Mr. Batra	
2025	Mannu Kya Karegga	Suryaprakash Sarod	
2025	Nishaanchi	Bhola Pehalwan	
2026	Hai Jawani Toh Ishq Hona Hai	Ghuggi	
2026	Ohh My Dog	Policeman	
2026	Babita Singh Reporting	SI Sethi	

== Awards ==
Year	Award	Category	Serial	Outcome
2005	Indian Telly Awards	Best Actor in a Comic Role	Sarabhai vs Sarabhai	Won
2012	Indian Telly Awards	Best Actor in a Comic Role (Jury Award)	Chintu Chinki Aur Ek Badi Si Love Story	Won
