= Khichdi (2002 TV series) =

Indian sitcom series

- Genre: Sitcom; Comedy drama
- Written by: Aatish Kapadia
- Directed by: Aatish Kapadia
- Country of origin: India
- Original language: Hindi
- No. of seasons: 3
- No. of episodes: 98 (list of episodes)

Production
- Executive producers: Ronnie Screwvala; Zarina Mehta
- Producers: Jamnadas Majethia; Aatish Kapadia
- Production companies: Hats Off Productions; UTV Software Communications

Original release
- Network: StarPlus
- Release: 10 September 2002 – 20 July 2004

Related
- Instant Khichdi; Khichdi Returns

Khichdi is a Hindi language sitcom produced by UTV Software Communications in association with Hats Off Productions, which debuted on StarPlus on 10 September 2002. The series has been rerun on StarPlus and its sister channels several times. It served as the first series in the Khichdi franchise. The second series in the franchise was called Instant Khichdi, which aired on Star Plus's sister channel, Star One. The reruns have aired on several channels including Star Utsav and Pogo. A twenty-episode third series also titled Khichdi premiered on 14 April 2018 on StarPlus.

== Premise ==
Khichdi follows the story of a Gujarati family called Parekhs, who lives in an old mansion. The joint family encounters many typically Indian situations, but they try to solve it in the most atypical fashion imaginable. This is a funny bunch of people that are firmly united in their movement to get separated. They want to sell their ancestral property and move out and form their own nuclear families. But the head of their family does not agree. He gives them the choice to walk out and survive on their own, but nobody is ready to let go of the money that is due to them. So they stay together and wait for the 'head' to change his mind or stop breathing, whichever happens first. And this is where the upwardly mobile middle-class joint family faces their trials and tribulations. Khichdi examines the lighter side of an Indian joint family.

== Characters ==
=== Main ===
Character	Portrayed by	Notes
Tulsidas Parekh	Anang Desai	Praful, Bharat, Raju, Heera and Meera's father; Damyanti's widower; Diwaliben's son; Jackky and Chakki's grandfather. He is the family patriarch. He is always in a bad mood but is known to have a good heart. His wife, Damyanti, died of a heart attack, Tulsidas lives with his family in his very old ancestral house called 'Mohan Niwas'. He does not agree to sell it at any cost, despite his children's pleas. Despite the frustration they cause, he still loves them. All family members call him 'Babuji'.
Praful Tulsidas Parekh	Rajeev Mehta	Tulsidas and Damyanti's elder son; Bharat, Raju, Heera and Meera's eldest brother; Hansa's husband; Chakki's father. He is notoriously stupid. He is often seen interpreting things at face value, leading to hilarious situations. He never does anything right, which makes people (especially Tulsidas) mad at him, who would utter the now popular dialog "Praful! Tu toh Gadhaa Hai!" (Praful! You're a Donkey!). He also translates English words for his wife, although always incorrectly.
Hansa Praful Parekh (née Seth)	Supriya Pathak	Praful's wife; Himanshu's elder sister; Chakki's mother and Chandrakant's daughter. She never works in the house, while repeating, "Mein to thak Gayi bhaaishaab" ("I'm so tired"). She is always richly dressed and cannot live without wearing 'Gajre' (strings of flowers) in her hair. She does not speak English and hence relies on Praful's errant translations.
Jayshree Bharat Parekh	Vandana Pathak	Bharat's widow; Jackky's mother; Jignesh's elder sister. She loves to cook and gossip and is often seen on the phone talking to her Baa (mother). She controls the management of the household. She aims to sell 'Mohan Niwas' and live in an independent apartment. She always irritates Tulsidas while serving tea to him. Hansa and Jayshree are childhood friends.
Himanshu Seth	Jamnadas Majethia	Hansa's younger brother; Behen Parminder's husband; Chandrakant's son. He also lives with the Parekhs and is as stupid as Hansa and Praful, with Babuji derisively addressing him as Moonchowaale Hansa (Mustached Hansa). He has a catering business. His favorite line is "Kissi ko pata nahi chalega" ("No one will know about it").
Chakki Praful Parekh	Richa Bhadra	Hansa and Praful's daughter. Unlike her parents, she is intelligent. She and her cousin Jacky use the catchphrase "Bade Log Bade Log" (Oh! the elders, the elders!).
Jackky Bharat Parekh	Yash Mittal	Jayashree and Bharat's son. Like Chakki, he is also intelligent and has the catchphrase "Bade Log Bade Log", which he says along with Chakki.

Character	Portrayed by	Notes
Diwaliben Parekh	Dina Pathak / Lily Patel	Tulsidas's mother; Praful, Bharat, Raju, Heera and Meera's paternal grandmother. She is fun-loving and fond of pani-puri (a popular spicy snack).
Raju Tulsidas Parekh	Amit Varma	Tulsidas and Damyanti's younger son; Praful, Bharat, Heera and Meera's brother; Melissa's husband. He flirts with any young beautiful girl he meets despite being married to Melissa.
Melissa Raju Parekh	Tina Parekh	Raju's wife. She is beautiful and educated. Jayshree is jealous of her and calls her 'Kadki'. Tulsidas regularly says of her, "Maine to pehle hi Kaha tha ki ye ladki Raju ke liye theek Nahi hai" ("I had said at the outset that this girl is not right for Raju").
Heera Tulsidas Parekh	Arya Rawal	Tulsidas's eldest daughter; Praful, Bharat, Raju and Meera's sister. She is lazy and often goes to the toilet. She is older than her fraternal twin, Meera.
Madhuri	Sweety Nayak	She is Heera's personal maid. Though she is a servant, Tulsidas fears her because she is often angry with him.
Meera Bhavesh Kumar	Ami Trivedi	Tulsidas's youngest daughter; Bhavesh Kumar's wife; Praful, Bharat, Raju and Heera's younger sister. She always holds a stick and behaves like a teacher. She is married to Bhavesh Kumar.
Bhavesh Kumar	Kamlesh Oza	Meera's husband. He lives with the Parekhs instead of in his own house. He often eats, but never works.
Mr. Mehta	Dinyar Contractor	He is Praful's boss in the office. He is infuriated by Praful's mistakes.
Parminder Singh (I)	Gireesh Sahedev	Bhabhi Parminder's husband; Bhai Parminder and Behen Parminder's elder brother. He becomes the neighbor of the Parekhs when they start living in 'Jagdamba Niwas'. In his entire family, everybody else is also named Parminder. He often argues with Tulsidas. He and his family imitate all the happenings in Chandigarh in their lifestyle.
Bhabhi Parminder	Seema Pandey	Parminder Singh's wife. Whenever she speaks, she makes a weird face which confuses everyone whether she meant good or bad.
Bhai Parminder	Damandeep Singh Baggan	Parminder Singh and Behen Parminder's brother. He is as stupid as Praful.
Heera's servant	Urmila Katkar	She is the maid of Heera.
Behen Parminder	Anokhi Srivastava	Himanshu's wife; Parminder Singh and Bhai Parminder's younger sister. She marries Himanshu.
Jignesh	Aatish Kapadia	Jayashree's younger brother. Also living with the Parekhs, he often repeats a sentence three times before finally speaking. He frequently says "Mujhe lagta hai ki..."

=== Guest appearances ===
- Alpana Buch as School Teacher.
- Amit Bhatt as various characters'
- Amit Singh Thakur as George Fernandaz, Melissa's father
- Anurag Prapanna as Pritam Bharadwaj
- Apara Mehta as Sandhya
- Arvind Vaidya as Chandrakant Seth
- Asha Bachani as Shiela Fernandaz, Melissa's mother
- Dilip Rawal as Inspector Dheeman Zhaveri
- Disha Vakani as various characters
- Ghanashyam Nayak as various characters
- Kabir Sadanand as grown-up Jacky
- Kalpana Diwan as Jagdamba Maami
- Kishwer Merchant as Rambha
- Krunal Pandit as School Principal's bodyguard
- Madhur Mittal as Honey Mehta
- Mayank Tandon as Hoshi
- Nitin Vakharia as Hotel Manager
- Nimisha Vakharia as Jyotsana Bai
- Prakash Bharadwaj as various characters
- Pratima T. as Hasumati Ben
- Rajesh Kumar as Chaggan / Vinod Kumar
- Rita Bhaduri as Hemlata Seth
- Sharad Sharma as Khabheja
- Shweta Tiwari as herself
- Simple Kaul as Manthara
- Sonu Kakkar as herself, in the Navratri special episode
- Suchita Trivedi as Mayuraakshi
- Sudha Chandran as helself
- Tapan Bhatt as Rajesh Gulati
- Vaishali Parmar as Praveena
- Vipra Rawal as Rekha Miss
- Utkarsh Mazumdar as various characters

== Awards and nominations ==
Khichdi has been almost continuously awarded television awards ever since its debut

=== Winner ===
- 2004: Best Actress-Comedy – Supriya Pathak as Hansa

=== Winner ===
- 2003: TV Actor in a Comic Role (Female) – Supriya Pathak as Hansa
- 2004: BEST Actor in a Comic Role (Male) – Rajeev Mehta as Praful
- 2004: Sitcom Writer of the Year – Aatish Kapadia

=== Nominated ===
- 2003: TV Child Artiste of the Year – Yash Mittal as Jacky
- 2004: The TV Sitcom / Comedy programme of the Year
- 2004: Lyricist of the Year – Aatish Kapadia
- 2004: Music Director of the Year – Uttank Vora
- 2004: Director of the Year (Sitcom) – Aatish Kapadia
- 2004: Child Artiste of the Year (Female) – Richa Bhadra as Chakki
- 2004: Child Artiste of the Year (Male) – Yash Mittal as Jacky
- 2004: Actor in a Comic Role (Male) – Rajeev Mehta as Praful
- 2004: Actor in a Comic Role (Male) – Anang Desai as Tulsidas Parekh
- 2004: Actor in a Comic Role (Female) – Supriya Pathak as Hansa
- 2004: Actor in a Comic Role (Female) – Vandana Pathak as Jayshree
- 2004: Ensemble (complete star cast of a programme)
- 2004: The Weekly Serial of the year
- 2004: Scriptwriter of the year – Aatish Kapadia

== See also ==
- List of Hindi comedy shows
