= Sarabhai vs Sarabhai =

Indian sitcom

- Genre: Sitcom
- Written by: Aatish Kapadia
- Directed by: Deven Bhojani; Aatish Kapadia
- Starring: Satish Shah; Ratna Pathak Shah; Sumeet Raghavan; Rupali Ganguly; Rajesh Kumar
- Opening theme: "Sarabhai Vs Sarabhai" by Usha Uthup
- Country of origin: India
- Original language: Hindi
- No. of seasons: 2
- No. of episodes: 80

Production
- Producers: Jamnadas D. Majethia; Aatish Kapadia
- Production company: Hats Off Productions

Original release
- Network: Star One (season 1); Disney+ Hotstar (season 2)
- Release: 1 November 2004 – 17 July 2017

Sarabhai vs Sarabhai is an Indian Hindi-language television sitcom that aired on STAR One from 1 November 2004 to 16 April 2006 and on Disney+ Hotstar from 15 May to 17 July 2017 for two seasons in 80 episodes altogether. The show was directed by Deven Bhojani and produced by Jamnadas D. Majethia and Aatish Kapadia under the production banner of Hats Off Productions. Starring an ensemble cast of Satish Shah, Ratna Pathak Shah, Sumeet Raghavan, Rupali Ganguly, and Rajesh Kumar, the show revolves around the Sarabhais, a quintessential upper-class Gujarati family living in the upmarket neighbourhood of Cuffe Parade in South Mumbai. The family members include the matriarch, Maya; her husband, Indravadan; their two sons, Sahil and Rosesh; Sahil's wife, Monisha; Indravadan and Maya's son-in-law, Dushyant; and Indravadan's brother-in-law, Madhusudan Fufa. Regarded as being ahead of its generation in terms of its concept, writing, and average viewership ratings at the time of its initial release, the show ultimately has gone on to become a cult classic.

== Synopsis ==
Sarabhai vs Sarabhai portrays the lives of the Sarabhais, a quintessential upper-class Gujarati family living in the upmarket neighbourhood of Cuffe Parade in South Mumbai. The matriarch of the family is Maya, a snobbish woman who always tries to maintain her high-society status. Her husband, Indravadan, is an indolent, insensitive and mischievous man, who enjoys teasing his wife and other family members. The couple has two sons and a daughter; Sahil, Rosesh and Sonia. Sahil is a cosmetologist and is quite calm, wise and noble as compared to other characters, while Rosesh is an aspiring poet and actor who often makes everyone cringe with his eccentric poetry and acting as well his peculiar and amusing voice. Sahil is married to Monisha, a middle-class Punjabi girl who constantly tries to fit in with her wealthy in-laws. Maya's socialite attitude and Monisha's middle-class habits always lead to conflicts and Indravadan's playful nature only increases them, while Sahil deals with his own personal and professional challenges.

Indravadan and Maya's son-in-law, Dushyant Painter, and Indravadan's brother-in-law, Madhusudan Fufa, are also part of the family. The gadget-freak Dushyant, married to Indravadan and Maya's psychic daughter, Sonia, is an electrical engineer, who has a morbid fascination for various electronic machines. He always irritates the family by explaining different theories about different gadgets and using Rosesh for each demonstration. Dushyant's catchphrase is "I'll explain!" and does not understand sarcasm which leads to humorous situations. On the other hand, the deaf Madhusudan Fufa, married to Indravadan's older sister, Ilaben, usually does not acknowledge the fact that he cannot hear and refuses to use a hearing aid. He is a former freedom fighter who repeatedly asks questions and blames others for speaking softly. Madhusudan Fufa interrupts almost always during conversations with his catchphrase "Hain?" and his misinterpretations are particularly bothersome to Indravadan.

Comedy and conflict ensue in the daily events occurring in the Sarabhais' lives and much of the mother-in-law humour in the show is derived from the shallow interactions among the city's elite and their perceived notions of the shortcomings and failings of middle-class society. The show has a cult-like status among all the Indian sitcoms.

== Cast ==
=== Main ===
- Satish Shah as Indravadan Sarabhai: Pankorben and Vallavdas's son; Ilaben's brother; Maya's husband; Sahil, Sonia and Rosesh's father
- Ratna Pathak Shah as Maya Mazumdar Sarabhai: Vidisha and Nayesha's sister; Indravadan's wife; Sahil, Sonia and Rosesh's mother
- Sumeet Raghavan as Dr. Sahil Sarabhai: Maya and Indravadan's son; Sonia and Rosesh's brother; Monisha's husband
- Rupali Ganguly as Manisha "Monisha" Singh Sarabhai: Jugalkishore's cousin; Sahil's wife
- Rajesh Kumar as Rosesh Sarabhai: Maya and Indravadan's younger son; Sahil and Sonia's brother; Jasmine's boyfriend
- Vaibhavi Upadhyay as Jasmine Mavani: Rosesh's girlfriend

=== Recurring ===
- Deven Bhojani as Dushyant Painter: Sonia's husband
- Arvind Vaidya as Madhusudan: Ilaben's husband
- Rita Bhaduri as Ilaben: Pankorben and Vallavdas's daughter; Indravadan's sister; Madhusudan's wife
- Kshitee Jog / Shital Thakkar / Aishwarya Sakhuja as Sonia Sarabhai: Maya and Indravadan's daughter; Sahil and Rosesh's sister; Dushyant's wife
- Tarla Joshi as Pankorben Sarabhai aka Baa: Vallavdas's wife; Indravadan and Ilaben's mother; Sahil, Sonia and Rosesh's grandmother
- Ghanashyam Nayak as Vitthal: Domestic worker of the Sarabhai family
- Sulbha Mantri as Radhabai: Domestic help of the Sarabhai family
- Aatish Kapadia as poet and competition judge Anirudh Mehta a.k.a. Kachcha Kela
- Ali Raza Namdar as Dinesh Jagirdar: Indravadan's close friend
- Shilpa Mehta as Sarita Jagirdar: Dinesh's wife; Indravadan and Maya's socialite friend
- Gurpal Singh as Baldev Singh: Swaroopa's husband; Indravadan and Maya's socialite friend
- Minal Karpe as Swaroopa Singh: Baldev's wife, a classical singer and Maya's socialite friend
- Usha Bachani as Vidisha Mazumdar: NRI; Maya and Nayesha's sister
- Girish Sahadev as Jugalkishore Singh: Monisha's cousin; Nayesha's husband
- Bhamini Oza as
  - Rita: Roshesh's theatre friend
  - Kissme: Madhusudhan's niece
- Chirag Channa as
  - Sharman Kapadia: Sarabhai's Close Relative
  - Krish Mazumdar: An Occult Science Student
- Meher Acharia Dar as Simple Khilawala

=== Cameos ===
- Yatin Karyekar as flop author Nagesh Iyer in "Meet The Sarabhais"
- Kishwer Merchant as Sahil's colleague Dr. Kiran in "Husbands Do Not Cheat"
- Deepali Sayyad as Rosesh's girlfriend Matsyagandha a.k.a. Maggi in "Rosesh Falls In Love"
- Mandira Bedi as Indravadan's girlfriend Cookie Sharma in "Indravadan's New Friend: Cookie Sharma"
- Manini Mishra as Sahil's former patient Dinky Chakravarti in "Who Is Dinky?"
- Supriya Pathak and Jamnadas D. Majethia as Maya's distant cousins Hansa Parekh and Himanshu Seth from the show Instant Khichdi in "Khichdi With Sarabhais"
- Mallika Sherawat as destitute girl Sunehri in "Sarabhais And Sunehri"
- Vaishali Thakkar as Sahil's patient Nilima Verma in "Nilima And Sahil"
- Parvin Dabas as upcoming artist Sudhanshu Khan in "Maya And Sudhanshu"
- Makarand Deshpande as famous hypnotist Dr. Siddharth Anirudh Prasad in "Indravadan Hypnotised: Part 1 And 2"
- Roop Kumar Rathod and Sonali Rathod as themselves in "Maya, Monisha And Antakshari"
- Aamir Ali as television actor Patang Kumar in "Monisha's Date With Actor Patang Kumar"
- Sunil Tawde as social activist Phadke in "Indravadan Becomes Homeless"
- Jaywant Wadkar as Yamraj in "Yamraj Comes For Indravadan"
- Parmeet Sethi as television character Detective Omkarnath in "The African Chant's Magic!"
- Rohitash Gaud as psychic Cindolin in "A Peek Into The Future"
- Siddharth Jadhav as killer at the Sarabhais in the future in "A Peek Into The Future"
- Madhavi Chopra as Priya, Dinesh and Sarita's daughter, Sahil's ex-fiancée

== Episodes ==
Series	Episodes	Originally released	
Series	Episodes	First released	Last released
1	70	1 November 2004	16 April 2006
2	10	15 May 2017	17 July 2017

=== Season 1 ===
The season revolves around the lives of five main characters and portrays conflicts in various contexts, focusing on themes such as family life and the upper class of Mumbai. The season features a variety of supporting characters that are intertwined with the lives of the main five characters, to add drama and comedy to the show. One of the main plots of the season is Rosesh's quest for a girl, and we get to meet different potential suitors throughout the season, all with extreme traits that clash with different members of the house. Another common plot is the conflict between Maya and Monisha in terms of her "middle-class" behaviour, with Sahil often caught in the middle of this conflict. Indravadhan, Maya's husband, is often found instigating these conflicts for his enjoyment. Throughout the season, the characters go through different social and emotional experiences, delving into their relationships, conflicts, interactions, and history. In the final episode, the principal characters state that there will be another season of the series.

=== Season 2 (Sarabhai vs Sarabhai: Take 2) ===
After eleven years, not much has changed in the life of the Sarabhai family. Monisha and Sahil now have a seven-year-old son named Aurnob, also known as Guddu. Rosesh has finally found love with Jasmine Mavani, who was given the main role in a TV serial but eventually lost it. The family has moved to new penthouses, and the season ends with Monisha asking for a divorce from Sahil, hinting at a new season to come.

== Production ==
=== Conception ===
Season 1

The show was produced by Jamnadas Majethia and Aatish Kapadia under the banner of Hatsoff Productions. The show was directed by Deven Bhojani along with Aatish Kapadia and the story and screenplay was also written by Aatish Kapadia. Sahil and Monisha are married and are living across Sahil's parents, Indravadhan and Maya Sarabhai, and Rosesh, their son, and Sahil's younger brother. Maya constantly taunts Monisha because of her behavior and language tone and constantly refers to her as "middle-class". Throughout the entire series, Sahil is kind of stuck between whether to take his wife's side or his mother's. Meanwhile, Indravadhan supports his daughter-in-law all the time. Rosesh, on the other side, is an actor who writes poetry that Sahil and Indravadhan dislike. Rosesh is a momma's boy and Maya's favorite child. Maya is a classy and sophisticated woman. The show also revolving around the relationships of rosesh and he get dumped by them for various reasons. The series goes through various events involving their lives.

Season 2 (Sarabhai vs Sarabhai: Take 2)

During the finale of season 1, the cast of the series confirmed returning with a new season. However, in 2012, Deven Bhojani denied that the series would return. The cast reunited in June 2016 over the belated 65th birthday party of Satish Shah, when the future of the show was discussed. The producer Jamnadas Majethia promised some good news for the fans. Later, the actors of the show confirmed the return of the new season as a web series entitled Sarabhai vs Sarabhai: Take 2. The series was picked up by Hotstar with the same cast, and the story is set 11 years after the last season's conclusion.

=== Casting ===
Deven Bhojani made a debut as a director in the first season. He also played the recurring character of Dushyant Painter in the series.

=== Filming ===
The first season was shot on sets located at Kanjurmarg in suburban Mumbai. The cast were provided with their own rooms backstage with nameplates with each character's name for rehearsals and preparations.

== Adaptations ==
Many of the characters in the Marathi series produced by Hats Off production as Madhuri Middle Class in 2014 on Star Pravah were inspired from Sarabhai, despite being a different story and character backgrounds. The show was unofficially adapted in Pakistan as Chana Jor Garam.

== Broadcast ==
Season 1 was broadcast from 2004 to 2006 on STAR One. Reruns of the series also aired on sister channel Star Utsav. Season 2 was released on digital platform Hotstar from 15 May 2017 to 17 July 2017.

The show was telecast from 6 April 2020 on Star Bharat, as the production of the ongoing series had to be stopped by the channel due to the COVID-19 pandemic.

== Reception ==
=== Critics and ratings ===
==== Season 1 ====
Season 1 was a weekly television show and was closed after two years due to low TRPs. The newly introduced stand-up comedy shows on the same network garnered TRPs as high as 9 while the Sarabhai received TRPs of as low as 0.63 during its inception. The highest rating it garnered during its original run time was 2 TVR. Only after the series started re-running episodes as a daily show multiple times, it became popular with a good viewership and response.

Hindustan Times appreciated the series, "Besides the concept that intrigued audiences of all age groups, the childlike accent of Rosesh Sarabhai (played by Rajesh Kumar) struck the right chord and became the ultimate trendsetter. Sarabhai vs Sarabhai turned the tables and gave each and every character equal screen space and importance.

Sampada Sharma of The Indian Express compared the series to American sitcom Everybody Loves Raymond, writing, "We have all loved Sarabhai vs Sarabhai, and for many, it is still one of the best Indian comedy shows, but what if I told you that way before Sarabhai, there was a show in the US that had a similar premise. This isn’t to say that Sarabhai is a copy of something Western but just to acknowledge that while Sarabhai’s jokes and characters are as original as they can be, the show’s basic plotline could have been somehow inspired by Ray Romano’s Everybody Loves Raymond."

==== Season 2 ====
Season 2 was one of the most anticipated sitcom sequels in India. It opened to a rather mixed response as compared to season 1. Later, the show was heavily criticized for poor writing and sets, but the performances were praised.

While Arushi Jain from The Indian Express appreciated the initial episode of the series stating, "After watching the entire episode of the Sarabhai Vs Sarabhai Take 2 and the same madness that prevailed in the Sarabhai family seven years ago, we felt as if the characters have not changed a bit. Though some jokes were repeated still we are not complaining. The nostalgia of watching the funny banter between Indravadan and Rosesh, and Maya Sarabhai on an anti-Monisha mission left us rolling on the floor laughing. It seems, some things just get better with age and Sarabhai vs Sarabhai definitely belongs to that category", while Sampada Sharma from the same outlet criticised the series in comparison with season 1 as, "The show was updated, the sets were glamorous, but sadly, it did not even come close to creating the charm that the original show had. While the original was known for its quick wit, sharp dialogues and sassy performances, the new one did nothing but remind us of the good old days."

=== Impact ===
The show was unofficially adapted in Pakistan as Chana Jor Garam for which in December 2020 the makers and cast of Sarabhai condemned for violating the copyrights of the series and also criticised the series for spoiling the essence of Sarabhai.

== Accolades ==
Season 1

The show won 5 Indian Telly Awards and Indian Television Academy Awards in 2005.

Indian Television Academy Awards 2005

- Best Serial, Comedy (Jury)
- Best Director, Comedy (Jury) – Deven Bhojani
- Best Actor, Comedy (Jury) – Satish Shah
- Best Actress, Comedy (Jury) – Ratna Pathak Shah
- Best Dialogues (Jury) – Aatish Kapadia

Indian Telly Awards 2005

- Best Serial (Comedy)
- Best Director (Comedy) – Deven Bhojani
- Best Actor (Comedy) – Satish Shah
- Best Actress (Comedy) – Ratna Pathak Shah
- Best Art Direction (Fiction) – Omung Kumar Bhandula
