= Rasik Dave =

Indian actor (1957–2022)

- Born: 19 June 1957
- Died: 29 July 2022 (aged 65)
- Education: Bachelor of Laws
- Occupation: actor
- Known for: his role of Nanda baba, father of Krishna in B. R. Chopra's television show Mahabharat
- Spouse: Ketki Joshi-Dave (m. 1983)
- Children: 1 son, 1 daughter

Rasik Dave (19 June 1957 – 29 July 2022) was an Indian actor working predominantly in Hindi television industry. He is best known for his role of Nanda baba, father of Krishna in B. R. Chopra's television show Mahabharat (1988). Dave had a Bachelor of Laws but pursued acting as career. His first appearance was in the Gujarati film Putra Vadhu.

== Personal life ==
Dave was married to actress Ketki Joshi-Dave; who is daughter of actress Sarita Joshi and Gujarati theatre actor Pravin Joshi. They met in 1979 during a common play and married in 1983. They together have a daughter Riddhi Dave and son Abhishek Dave. Riddhi is also a theatre actress.

== Death ==
Rasik Dave died on 29 July 2022 due to complications from kidney failure. He suffered for over four years and was on dialysis frequently.

== Filmography ==
Year	Title	Role	Genre	Language	Notes
	Putra Vadhu		Film	Gujarati	1985 Jhoothi film Hindi
	Mahabharat	Nanda baba	TV series	Hindi	Aired on DD National
1989	Eeshwar	Eeshwar's son	Film	Hindi	
1994–95	Tehkikaat	Various roles	TV series	Hindi	Aired on DD National
1996	Masoom		Film	Hindi	
1997	Hasratein	Bobby Mehra	TV series	Hindi	Aired on Zee TV
1997	Byomkesh Bakshi	Inspector Ratikant Chaudhry	TV series	Hindi	Aired on DD National; Episode Aag aur Patanga
1998	Alpviram	Amit Bakshi	TV series	Hindi	Aired on Sony TV
1999–2000	Ek Mahal Ho Sapno Ka	Shekhar Purushottam Nanavati	TV series	Hindi	Aired on Sony TV
2006	Nach Baliye 2	Self	Reality TV show	Hindi	Celebrity Dance competition Aired on StarPlus
2009	Straight	Jaysukh kaka	Film	Hindi	
2002	Lipstick	Vivek	TV series	Hindi	Aired on Zee TV
2013–14	Sanskaar - Dharohar Apnon Ki	Karsandas Vaishnav	TV series	Hindi	Aired on Colors TV
2014	Piya Basanti Re	Mahesh Shah	TV series	Hindi	Aired on Sony TV
2017–18	Aisi Deewangi Dekhi Nahi Kahi	Dharam Singh Rathod	TV series	Hindi	Aired on Zee TV
2018–19	Roop - Mard Ka Naya Swaroop	Haren Patel		Hindi	Aired on Colors TV
	Savdhaan India	Doctor Naik		Hindi	Episode 1298
1985	Jhoothi	Sunil	Film	Hindi	
