= List of Sarabhai vs Sarabhai characters =

Sarabhai vs Sarabhai is an Indian sitcom that ran on STAR One from 1 November 2004 to 16 April 2006 and on Hotstar from 15 May 2017 to 17 July 2017 for two seasons. The show was produced by Jamnadas Majethia and Aatish Kapadia under the banner of Hats Off Productions and was directed by Deven Bhojani. Starring an ensemble cast of Satish Shah, Ratna Pathak Shah, Sumeet Raghavan, Rupali Ganguly and Rajesh Kumar, the show revolves around a quintessential upper-class family living in the upmarket neighbourhood of Cuffe Parade in South Mumbai. Regarded as being ahead of its generation in terms of its concept, writing, and average viewership ratings at the time of its initial release, the show has gone on to become a cult classic.

== Main characters ==
=== Indravadan "Indu" Sarabhai ===
Indravadan Sarabhai, portrayed by Satish Shah, is Pankorben and Vallavdas's son, Ilaben's brother, Maya's husband, Sahil, Sonia and Rosesh's father. He is an ex-director of a multinational company, who retired early to take care of the children and help his wife Maya work as a social worker. He is arguably one of the funniest characters in the show who does not hesitate to make a joke about something or someone even in the worst of situations. He constantly makes fun of Maya and plays tricks on her but still loves her a lot, he has a fun and friendly rapport with his older son Sahil, and also loves his daughter Sonia, but makes fun of his younger son Rosesh, irritating him on various occasions, while he still loves him. He also shares a playful rapport with his daughter-in-law, Monisha and sides with her during her and Maya's confrontations. He gets irritated by his son-in-law Dushyant, as well as his sister's husband Madhusudan Bhai.

=== Maya Mazumdar Sarabhai ===
Maya Mazumdar Sarabhai, portrayed by Ratna Pathak Shah, is Indravadan's wife, Sahil, Sonia and Rosesh's mother. She is the matriarch of the Sarabhai family and runs the family like a pro. Being a snooty upper-class socialite, her daughter-in-law Monisha's middle-class money-saving techniques and unkempt behaviour are constant pet peeves for Maya. Her catchphrase is "It's catastrophically middle-class!" and continuously uses sarcasm to taunt Monisha and make her see the error of her ways. Whenever she taunts Monisha, depending on the intensity of the taunts, one to three gunshots are heard in the background, increasing the humor in these situations and portraying her as a verbal bullet. She is constantly after her husband Indravadhan to fix his dietary and cleanliness habits, not much unlike Monisha, and pampers her younger son Rosesh, also making sure he does not take a middle-class wife like her older son Sahil. Her son-in-law Dushyant also irritates her by dropping in every time an appliance is damaged.

=== Dr. Sahil Sarabhai ===
Dr. Sahil Sarabhai, portrayed by Sumeet Raghavan, is Maya and Indravadan's son, Sonia and Rosesh's brother, Monisha's husband and Aurnob's father. He is a cosmetologist and very composed as compared to the other characters. He is calm, wise, and noble, and is constantly trying to resolve various conflicts in his family between Maya and Monisha, and Maya and Indravadan. He often gets sandwiched between his mother and wife and tries his best not to hurt anyone. He avoids conflicts but loves making fun of his younger brother Rosesh, similar to Indravadan. When he was a child, Indravadan revealed that Sahil always used to be the protagonist whenever they used to act.

=== Manisha "Monisha" Singh Sarabhai ===
Monisha Singh Sarabhai, portrayed by Rupali Ganguly, is Sahil's wife and Aurnob's mother. She is a middle-class, Punjabi girl from Noida, who rarely keeps the house clean and is always lazing around watching daily soaps on the television. She develops a dramatic nature from these shows. Her passion is to save money, in every situation. She is always at loggerheads with Maya for her thrifty ways. Her father-in-law Indravadan always supports her, while her husband Sahil is torn between the two. Despite being careless, Monisha is an honest, innocent, and a loving woman. She was originally named "Manisha" but was renamed "Monisha" after marriage by Maya as she found the name Manisha "too middle-class".

=== Rosesh Sarabhai ===
Rosesh Sarabhai, portrayed by Rajesh Kumar, is Maya and Indravadan's son, Sahil and Sonia's brother and Jasmine's love interest. He is a theatre artist, an aspiring actor, and a so-called poet. He is Maya's favourite and she pampers him a lot. He wants to become an actor and his mother Maya supports him the most. Maya is the only member of the Sarabhai family who approves of and appreciates his absurd poetry and acting skills. He has a love-hate relationship with Indravadan as he is always the target of his jokes and pranks. He always seconds his mother even if he does not feel like it. He has a peculiar and amusing voice, and his poems are always bad but funny. He speaks very oddly, and Sahil and Indravadan always compare his voice with animals like ducks and machines like a mixer. Indravadan always trolls Rosesh for being a mother's puppet, yet he loves him and it is proven by the fact that whenever Rosesh is in danger, he is ready to help him.

=== Aurnob Sarabhai (Season 2) ===
Aurnob Sarabhai is Monisha and Sahil's son. He is the only heir to the Sarabhai family and has inherited equal traits from his parents as sometimes he shows so-called middle-class habits like watching daily soaps with his mother Monisha; and sometimes he shows the upper-class attitude like his paternal grandmother Maya. He is loved by all the family members and has a playful and friendly rapport with his paternal grandfather Indravadan. He always promotes the technology advancements of the modern times and sometimes even shows eccentric behaviour like his family.

== Recurring characters ==
=== Sonia Sarabhai ===
Sonia Sarabhai, portrayed by Kshitee Jog and Sheetal Thakkar in Season 1, and by Aishwarya Sakhuja in Season 2, is Maya and Indravadan's daughter, Sahil and Rosesh's sister and Dushyant's wife. She is a psychic, who exhibits some of Maya's socialite attitude and can see future through some techniques which is often a trouble for the Sarabhai family.

=== Dushyant Painter ===
Dushyant Painter, portrayed by Deven Bhojani, is Sonia's husband. He is an electrical engineer, whose catchphrase is "I'll explain!" is much despised by the rest of the family, even by the normally affable Monisha. He has a morbid fascination for various electronic appliances from toasters to tubelights to refrigerators to elevators and loves to explain different theories about the machines whenever he finds a chance. He does not understand sarcasm which leads to humorous situations.

=== Ilaben Sarabhai ===
Ilaben Sarabhai, portrayed by Rita Bhaduri, is Madhusudan Bhai's wife, Vallavdas and Pankorben's older daughter, Indravadan's older sister, Maya's sister-in-law, Sahil, Sonia and Rosesh's paternal aunt, Monisha and Dushyant's aunt-in-law, and in Season 2, also Aurnob's grandaunt. She often visits her brother Indravadan and sister-in-law Maya, and helps them sort their daily troubles. She is a sweet, lively person who is extremely tolerant with her husband Madhusudan Bhai and is the only one able to communicate with him through hand gestures.

=== Madhusudan Bhai ===
Madhusudan Bhai, portrayed by Arvind Vaidya, is Ilaben's husband, Indravadan's brother-in-law, Maya's co-brother, Sahil, Sonia and Rosesh's uncle, Monisha and Dushyant's uncle-in-law, Vallavdas and Pankorben's older son-in-law, and in Season 2, also Aurnob's granduncle. He is deaf and a former freedom fighter, who refuses to use a hearing aid and usually does not acknowledge the fact that he cannot hear. He blames others for speaking too softly and repeatedly asks questions. He is particularly bothersome to his wife's brother Indravadan and interjects almost always during conversations with his catchphrase "Hain?". A lot of humour is derived from his misinterpretations and the difficulty that people have in explaining things to him, which only his wife Ilaben is able to do.

=== Pankorben Sarabhai ===
Pankorben Sarabhai a.k.a. Baa, portrayed by Tarla Joshi, is Vallavdas' wife, Indravadan and Ilaben's mother, Maya and Madhusudan Bhai's mother-in-law, Sahil, Sonia and Rosesh's paternal grandmother, Monisha and Dushyant's grandmother-in-law, and in Season 2, also Aurnob's great-grandmother. She died five years before the show began. She is often mentioned by Indravadan and Maya and appears in some flashback scenes, where she ridicules her daughter-in-law Maya for being snooty and "high-society", and rebukes her son Indravadan for his choice to marry her.

=== Jasmine Mavani (Season 2) ===
Jasmine Mavani, portrayed by Vaibhavi Upadhyay, is Madhusudan Bhai's distant relative and Rosesh's love interest. She is a singer and theatre artist, whose accent and broken English is disapproved by Maya.

== Other characters ==
Other characters include the Sarabhai family's domestic helpers Radhabai (portrayed by Sulbha Mantri) and Vitthal Kaka (portrayed by Ghanashyam Nayak), Maya's socialite friends Baldev (portrayed by Gurpal Singh) and Sarupa Singh, Maya's close friend Sarita (portrayed by Shilpa Mehta) and her husband Dinesh, and Maya's younger NRI sisters; Vidisha (portrayed by Usha Bachani), a single socialite, and Nayesha Mazumdar (portrayed by Sumeet Raghavan in a dual role), a divorcee, who is remarried with Monisha's cousin brother Jugalkishore Singh (portrayed by Gireesh Sahedev), and a poet having different poetry similar to that of Rosesh named Anirudh Mehta a.k.a. Kaccha Kela (portrayed by Aatish Kapadia), as well as Madhusudan Bhai's niece Kismi, and Rosesh's co-actress Rita (both portrayed by Bhamini Oza Gandhi).

== Guest ==
=== Season 1 ===
- Yatin Karyekar as writer Nagesh Iyer in Sahil In A book(Pilot)
- Kishwer Merchant as Dr. Kiran in Husbands Do Not Cheat
- Usha Bachani as Vidisha in Maya's Cleanliness Drive
- Mandira Bedi as Cookie Sharma in Indravadhan's Fantasies, Foiled
- Deepali sayad as Maggie (Matsyagandha) "Rosesh Is In Love"
- Manini Mishra as Dinky Chakravarthy in Sahil's Personal Diary
- The Khichdi (TV series) Family from the Khichdi Crossover Episode ( Khichdi With Sarabhais of Sarabhai vs Sarabhai and Episode 25 of Instant Khichdi).
- Mallika Sherawat as Sunehri to promote her movie Bachke Rehna Re Baba in Sarabhais With Sunehri
- Vaishali Thakkar as Neelima Verma in Nilima And Sahil
- Parvin Dabas as Sudhanshu Khan in Sudhanshu Paints Maya and Maya And Sudhanshu
- Makrand Deshpande as the hypnotist Siddharth in Indravadan Hypnotized Part 1 and Indravadan Hypnotized Part 2
- Roop Kumar Rathod & Sunali Rathod as themselves in Maya, Monisha And Antakshari
- Jimit Trivedi
- Aamir Ali as Patang Mahajan in Monisha's Date With Actor Karan
- Aatish Kapadia as the poet Anirudh Mehta urf "Kachcha Kela" in Episode 53
- Parmeet Sethi as Detective Omkar Nath to promote the Star One show D.O.N. in The Midas Chang's Magic
- Shilpa Mehta as Maya's socialite friend Sarita, seen in many episodes.
- Rohitash Gaud as Mr. Cindolin, the mystic who shows Sarabhai family their future in Crystal Ball Time.
- Bhamini Oza Gandhi as Kissme, Madhusudhan's niece and Rita
- Sanat Vyas as Dr. Acharya (Original)

=== Season 2 ===
- Aatish Kapadia as the poet Anirudh Mehta urf "Kachcha Kela" in Episode 6 and 8
- Vishal Gandhi as "Bahu Machhar Beta Khachhar" Director in Episode 9
- Jamnadas Majethia as Prahlad in Episode 9
- Sameksha Singh as Arnab's Teacher Ms. Pochkanwala
- Bhakti Chauhan as Patralekha Patni
