= Jhoothi =

- Directed by: Hrishikesh Mukherjee
- Written by: Sachin Bhowmick(screenplay); Bimal Dutta (story); Rahi Masoom Reza (dialogue)
- Produced by: Debesh Ghosh
- Starring: Rekha; Raj Babbar; Amol Palekar; Supriya Pathak
- Cinematography: Jaywant Pathare
- Edited by: Khan Zaman Khan
- Music by: Bappi Lahiri
- Release date: 23 September 1985
- Running time: 136 minutes
- Country: India
- Language: Hindi

Jhoothi (transl. Liar) is a 1985 Indian Hindi-language comedy film directed by Hrishikesh Mukherjee. The film stars Rekha, Raj Babbar, Amol Palekar, Supriya Pathak and Deven Verma.

== Plot ==
Kalpana, a tomboyish character, lives with her mother, sister Alpana and brother Kamal, a police inspector. Kalpana is a compulsive liar but always for a good cause, landing herself and others often, in peculiar situations and misunderstandings too. While she sets up her brother with Seema and helps her sister Alpana come closer to Rasik, she herself falls for Dr Anil.

== Songs ==
Maya Govind wrote all the songs.

Song	Singer
"Chanda Dekhe Chanda, To Woh Chanda Sharmaye"	Kishore Kumar, Lata Mangeshkar
"Bhaaga Bhaaga"	Asha Bhosle
"Jhoothi Jhoothi"	Asha Bhosle
"Thoda Jhuth To Akal Ka Ek Moti Hai"	Asha Bhosle, Usha Mangeshkar
"Aaya Jab Se Tu Dil Mein"	S. Janaki

== Cast ==
- Rekha as Kalpana Srivastav
- Raj Babbar as Dr. Anil Gupta / Nirmal
- Amol Palekar as Inspector Kamal Nath Srivastav, Kalpana & Alpana's elder brother
- Supriya Pathak as Seema
- Deven Verma as Rasik Lal Sharma
- Prema Narayan as Alpana Srivastav, Kalpana's middle sister
- Madan Puri as Professor Puri
- Goga Kapoor as Babulal
- Shammi as Shanti
- Dina Pathak as Seema's mother
- Gopi Desai as Kalpana' friend
- Ajit Vachani Lawyer
- Chandrakant Thakkar Public Prosecutor
- Manmauji Ganju (goon)
- Suresh Chatwal as Pancha
- Rasik Dave as Sunil/ Anil Gupta' brother
