= Darshan Gurjar =

Indian actor

- Born: 5 September 2001 (age 24); Ahmedabad, Gujarat, India
- Occupation: Actor
- Years active: 2012–present

Darshan Gurjar is an Indian film and TV actor working in Bollywood films and Indian TV Serials. He has worked in more than 5 films, 17 TV serials and around 10 commercial films.

== Career ==
Darshan started his films career in 2012 with Gunday, a film under the banner of Yash Raj Films. He played the young character of Ranveer Singh, Bikram. After that, got chances to work in several films such as Ishq Junoon, Tennis Buddies, Paper Boats, etc.

Darshan mainly worked in India Television daily soaps. He came into the limelight with the Colors TV show Udaan, as Suraj.

== Filmography ==
=== Television ===
Year	Title	Role
2012	Jamuna Paar	Chotte
2012	Devon Ke Dev...Mahadev	Kartikeya
2014	Udaan	Young Suraj
2022	Ziddi Dil Maane Na	Tilli
2022–2025	Pushpa Impossible	Chirag Patel

=== Films ===
Year	Title	Role	Notes	Ref.
2014	Gunday	Young Bikram Bose		
2016	An Untold Story of Paperboats		Short film	
2016	Ishq Junoon	Young Rajbir		
2018	Tennis Buddies	Arjun		
2021	Silence... Can You Hear It?	Trekker		
2026	Deewaar	Young Ravi Verma	Hindi film	
2026	Baazigar	Young Ravi Verma	Telugu film	
