= Ghoom (film) =

- Directed by: Saket Chaudhary
- Written by: Ashish Patil; Mahesh Ramchandani; Rahul Patel; Ashok Khanna; Varun Grover
- Based on: Dhoom by Vijay Krishna Acharya
- Produced by: Sailesh Dave; MTV
- Starring: Sumeet Raghavan; Gaurav Chopra; Ajay Gehi; Purbi Joshi
- Cinematography: Madhu Vanier
- Edited by: Vivek–Mayour
- Music by: Lovvkhush
- Production companies: Runaway Productions; MTV Fully Faltoo Films
- Distributed by: Viacom 18
- Release date: 2 June 2006
- Running time: 60 minutes
- Country: India
- Language: Hindi

Ghoom is an Indian parody comedy film directed by Saket Chaudhary and produced by Runaway Productions on 2 June 2006. The film is a spoof of the 2004 film Dhoom. The film stars Sumeet Raghavan, Ajay Gehi, Purbi Joshi and Gaurav Chopra. The film had a limited theatrical release in four cities on 2 June 2006 before its television premiere on 17 June 2006 on MTV India.

== Plot ==
A super cop, wanting to get back at a gang of five biker thieves, enlists the help of a mechanic. The mechanic is revealed to be of lesser intelligence than that of the cop. A robbery takes place at a well-known dance bar, resulting in a riot of idiotic incidents.

== Cast ==
- Sumeet Raghavan as Inspector Vijay Dikshit
- Gaurav Chopra as Balbir
- Ajay Gehi as Neal
- Benika Bisht as Tweety Dikshit
- Purbi Joshi as Sun tanned, moon-shined girl
- Feroz as Amitabh Bachchan
- Gufi Paintal as Vijay Dikshit's boss
- Rajesh Balwani as Mohre
