= Bollywood Beats =

- Theatrical release poster
- Directed by: Mehul Shah
- Screenplay by: Mehul Shah
- Produced by: Mehul Shah; Mansi Patel; JoseLuis Partida
- Starring: Sachin Bhatt; Lilette Dubey; Pooja Kumar; Sarita Joshi; Mansi Patel; Mehul Shah
- Cinematography: Roger Lindley
- Edited by: Kuldeep Dhyani
- Music by: Indraneel Hariharan
- Distributed by: Breaking Glass Pictures; Kinetik Films, LLC
- Release date: 2009
- Running time: 113 minutes
- Country: United States
- Language: English

Bollywood Beats is a 2009 Bollywood-inspired dance film written and directed by Mehul Shah. It was produced by Kinetik Films and distributed by Breaking Glass Films.

== Plot ==
Raj (Sachin Bhatt) is an Indian-American choreographer trying to make it in the bustling city of Los Angeles. After being dumped by his girlfriend, bombing another dance audition, and nearly getting kicked out of his parents' home, Raj's luck changes when he meets Jyoti, (Lilette Dubey), a sexy Indian woman, who suggests for him to teach her and a group of Indian women dance.

While unsuccessful at the start, Raj's class grows with Vincent, (Mehul Shah), a gay teen who wants to dance regardless of what his father thinks, Laxmi, (Pooja Kumar), a South Indian woman new to this country and friendless, Puja, (Mansi Patel) an unenthusiastic high school student, who is being dragged by her grandmother, Vina (Sarita Joshi).

Through it all, the group manages to find family, love, and acceptance where they least expected to.

== Cast ==
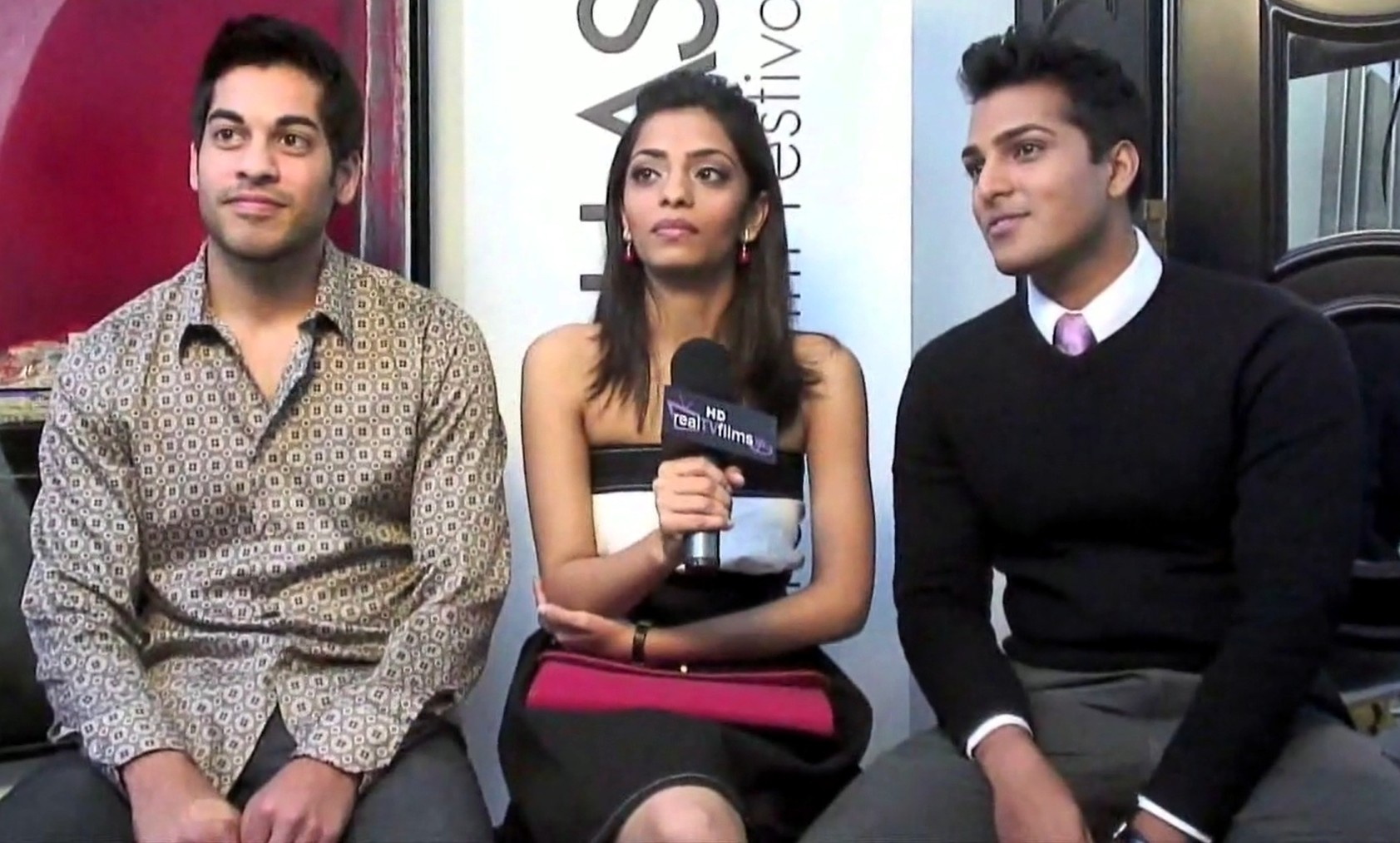
Left to right:Actors Sachin Bhatt, Mansi Patel, director Mehul Shah discuss Bollywood Beats in 2009

- Sachin Bhatt as Raj
- Lilette Dubey as Jyoti
- Pooja Kumar as Laxmi
- Mansi Patel as Puja
- Mehul Shah as Vincent
- Namrata Nagraj as Payal
- Ramesh Chandiramani as Ramesh
- Aarti Chandiramani as Kirti
- Farah White as Elizabeth
- Nishendu Vasavada as Manoj
- Asif Taj as Ram
- Sarita Joshi as Vina

== Release ==
=== Release ===
Bollywood Beats travelled internationally to various film festivals, including the Mumbai International Festival, the St. Louis International Film Festival, The Mahindra Indo-American Arts Council Film Festival, Tongues on Fire International Film Festival in London, AFI Film Festival in Dallas, and the Asian Festival of First Films in Singapore.

It is currently being distributed by Breaking Glass Pictures domestically and internationally. The film can be seen on here TV and OUTtv in Canada.

== Film Festivals ==
2009 Mumbai International Film Festival-Official Selection
2009 AFI Dallas-Official Selection
540 Film Festival in Fayetville, AR-Official Selection
2009 St. Louis International Film Festival-Official Selection
2009 Mahindra Indo-American Film Council Film Festival, New York-Official Selection
2010 Tongues on Fire Film Festival, London-Official Selection
2010 Asian Festival of First Films, Singapore-Official Selection (Best Screenplay Nominee)
2015 Whistler Pride Film Festival, Whistler, Canada

== Soundtrack ==
The soundtrack has music featuring the Indian hip hop group The Bilz ft. Kashif with the tracks "Turn the Music Up," and "Two-Step Bhangra." It also features tracks from London-based Punjabi rapper Hard Kaur, featuring the songs "Sexy Boy" and "Bombay Deewana." The soundtrack also featured classic Bollywood Tunes such as "O Haseena Zulfowali", "Dum Maro Dum", "Jawani Janeman", "Say Na Say Na", and the title track "Dance all Night" by Indraneel Hariharan and Siddhant Bhatia.
