= Preston Strother =

American teen actor (born 1999)

- Born: Preston Thomas Strother; January 28, 1999 (age 26); Dallas, Texas
- Education: Oaks Christian School
- Alma mater: University of California, Los Angeles
- Occupation: Actor
- Years active: 2005–present

Preston Strother (born January 28, 1999) is an American teen actor born in Dallas, Texas.

== Biography ==
He is best known for playing the Fox in Ni Hao, Kai-Lan, Arthur Junior in Batman: The Brave and the Bold, and several television shows and movies. His older brother, Tyler Strother, is also an actor and now attends Bentley University in Boston, Massachusetts.

At the age of four, Preston Strother started acting, signing with a talent agent in Dallas, who booked him in a commercial audition for Lowes. Preston's first coach was Catherine Hart, a Dallas-based acting coach who has taught many young actors.

Strother first appeared in plays for Dallas Children's Theater, and has appeared on many commercials nationally and locally such as for Pizza Hut and the American Heart Association.

He ran varsity cross country and track at his high school, Oaks Christian School in Westlake Village, California. He now attends the University of California, Los Angeles.

== Filmography ==
Year	Title	Role	Notes
2005	Hate Crime	Boy in Church	Uncredited
2006	Barney	Peter	3 Episodes
2008	The Temerity of Zim	Student	Short Film
2008	Ni Hao, Kai-Lan	Fox (voice)	19 Episodes
2009	Eli Stone	Italian Boy	Season 2, Episode 11
2009	Midgets vs. Mascots	Kickball Kid	Uncredited
2009	The Final Destination	Pool Boy with Mask	Uncredited
2009	Community	Guard Kid	Season 3, Episode 20
2009	Leo Little's Big Show	Cousin Rick	
2010	What Would Jesus Do?	Jake Mitchell	
2010	Brothers & Sisters	Narrator	Season 5, Episode 4
2010	Criminal Minds	Sammy Bennett	Season 6, Episode 5
2011	BrainSurge	2 Episodes	
2011	Oliver's Ghost	Tony	
2010-2011	Batman: The Brave and the Bold	Arthur Jr./Kyle (voice)	3 Episodes
