= Footfairy =

2020 Hindi film

- Promotional poster
- Directed by: Kanishk Varma
- Written by: Kanishk Varma
- Screenplay by: Prawaal Raman
- Produced by: Anurag Bedi; Ruchir Tiwari; Nitin Upadhyaya
- Starring: Ashish Pathode; Gulshan Devaiah; Sagarika Ghatge; Kunaal Roy Kapur; Muskan Bamne; Karan Arvind Bendre; Shamal Rokade; Yogesh Soman
- Cinematography: Pratik Deora
- Edited by: Sumit Purohit
- Music by: Jeet Gannguli
- Distributed by: &pictures
- Release date: 24 October 2020 (India)
- Running time: 115 minutes
- Country: India
- Language: Hindi

Footfairy is a Hindi-language crime-thriller film, directed by Kanishk Varma and produced by Anurag Bedi, Ruchir Tiwari and Nithin Upadhyaya. It starrs Gulshan Devaiah, Sagarika Ghatge, Kunaal Roy Kapur, Muskan Bamne, Karan Arvind Bendre, Ashish Pathode, Shamal Rokade and Yogesh Soman.

== Plot ==
Footfairy begins with the murder of Rita Madhav, whose body is discovered in a red suitcase, her feet missing. Inspector Vivaan (Gulshan Devaiah) is assigned to investigate the case, which is the latest in a string of killings by a serial killer dubbed "Footfairy." The killer targets women near railway tracks, leaving their bodies mutilated.

Vivaan meets pediatrician Devika, who shares her knowledge of psychopathy, and they soon begin dating. The investigation leads the police to a suspect, Joshua (Kunaal Roy Kapur), a restaurant owner with a foot fetish and a history of violent tendencies. However, despite circumstantial evidence, they cannot definitively prove his guilt. When Vivaan's neighbor becomes the next victim, he violently interrogates Joshua, but DNA evidence exonerates him. Joshua sues the police for defamation, and the case stalls as the killings mysteriously stop when Joshua leaves town.

Seven years later, Vivaan has left the police force, married Devika, and started a security agency. A chance encounter with a child at the railway tracks reveals that the real Footfairy is still at large. The film ends with the suggestion that the killer has moved to another country, as shown in the final scene where a similar murder occurs abroad.

== Cast ==
- Gulshan Devaiah as CBI Inspector Vivan Deshmukh
- Sagarika Ghatge as Devika
- Shonita Joshi as Anisha Kulkarni
- Kunaal Roy Kapur as Joshua Matthews
- Yogesh Soman as Saleem Sir
- Ashish Pathode as Harsh
- Taneea Rajawat as Rita Madhav

== Soundtrack ==
The movie has three songs recorded at Zee Music Company by music director Jeet Gannguli.

Track listing
No.	Title	Lyrics	Music	Singer(s)	Length
1.	"Andhera"	Rashmi Virag	Jeet Gannguli	Shivi	04:16
2.	"Andhera Unplugged"	Rashmi Virag	Jeet Gannguli	Pawni Pandey	03:50
3.	"Andhera"	Rashmi Virag	Jeet Gannguli	Jyotica Tangri	04:12
Total length:					11.78

== Release ==
The film was released on &pictures on 24 October 2020. A week later it is released on Netflix.

== Reception ==
Rishita Roy Chowdhury for India Today rated the film 4 out of 5 stars and wrote, "Footfairy is paced impressively. As soon as one attempts to crack the identity of the serial killer, the story turns. One is kept guessing throughout the run of the film, until the very closing scene." Moumita Bhattacharjee of Rediff.com found Footfairy an "intriguing and shocking". She further wrote, "The performances are nuanced and not a single character is without a purpose. Gulshan Devaiah takes time to grow on you because he isn't the usual brooding police officer with a dark past. There's no back story here, just the investigation."

Conversely, Ruchi Kaushal of Hindustan Times felt upset about the disappointing ending and writes, "Even if the maker wants to not just highlight the obsession of the footfairy but also of a CBI officer obsessed with finding the culprit, the film feels pointless".
