= Muskan Bamne =

Indian actress (born 1999)

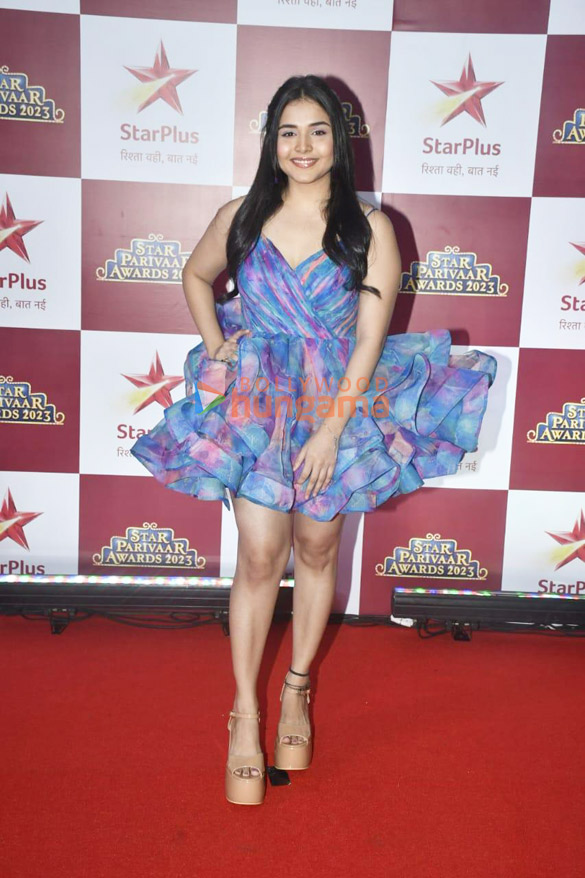
- Bamne at the Star Parivaar Awards 2023
- Born: 10 September 1999 (age 27); Itarsi, Madhya Pradesh, India
- Occupations: Actress; model
- Years active: 2013-present
- Known for: Anupamaa; Bigg Boss 18; Pushpa Impossible

Muskan Bamne (born 1999) is an Indian film and television actress. She is best known for her role as Pakhi Shah in the Star Plus television series Anupamaa (2020–2023). Bamne began her career as a child artist and later gained wider recognition through her work in Hindi cinema and television. In 2024, she participated in Bigg Boss 18.

== Early life ==
Bamne was born on 10 September 1999 in Itarsi, Madhya Pradesh, India. She later relocated to Mumbai, Maharashtra, where she resides and works. She has a younger sister, Simran Bamne, who is also an actress.

== Career ==
Bamne began her acting career in the Hindi film industry. She made her film debut in 2017 with Haseena Parkar, in which she portrayed the younger version of the character played by Shraddha Kapoor. In 2018, she appeared in the film Helicopter Eela, playing a supporting role as a friend of the protagonist’s son.

Alongside films, Bamne worked in television, appearing in supporting roles in shows such as Bakula Bua Ka Bhoot, Super Sisters, and Gumrah. These early roles helped her establish herself as a television actress.

In 2020, Bamne was cast as Pakhi Shah in the StarPlus drama series Anupamaa. The character, the daughter of the show’s titular protagonist, was portrayed as emotionally complex and often conflicted. The series became one of the highest-rated television shows in India and Bamne’s performance brought her widespread recognition. She was part of the show for three years.

In 2023, Bamne exited Anupamaa. The departure coincided with a narrative shift in which her character was to be portrayed as a mother. Bamne stated that she felt she was too young to take on such a role and chose to leave the show amicably. She later described the role as a turning point in her career.

In 2023, she appeared in the Amazon miniTV web series Constable Girpade. In 2024, Bamne entered the reality television show Bigg Boss 18, hosted by Salman Khan. She was the second contestant to be evicted from the season, following a vote by fellow housemates rather than a public vote.

Since February 2026, Bamne appear as Shanaya Mehta in the Indian drama television series Pushpa Impossible.

== Filmography ==
In Anupamaa, Bamne portrayed Pakhi Shah, a character that earned her national recognition and established her as a prominent television actress.

Key
| † | Denotes films that have not yet been released |

=== Films ===
| Year | Title | Role | Language | Notes | Ref. |
|---|---|---|---|---|---|
| 2014 | Yoddha | Unknown | Bengali | Child/minor role | |
| 2016 | Daayra | Unknown | Hindi | Short film | |
| 2017 | Haseena Parkar | Umaira | Hindi | Bollywood debut; daughter of Shraddha Kapoor's character | |
| 2018 | Helicopter Eela | Deepti | Hindi | Alongside Kajol | |
| 2020 | Footfairy | Richa | Hindi | Released on &pictures; streaming on Netflix | |

=== Television ===
| Year | Title | Role | Notes | Ref. |
|---|---|---|---|---|
| 2012-2013 | Haunted Nights | Unknown | Episodic | |
| 2013-2020 | Crime Patrol | Various | Multiple episodes; Sony Entertainment Television | |
| 2014 | Gustakh Dil | Unknown | Guest Role | |
| 2016 | Gumrah | Unknown | Ekta Kapoor production | |
| 2017 | Bakula Bua Ka Bhoot | Dhabbu Mohit Raja | &TV | |
| 2018 | Ek Thi Heroine | Unknown | Episodic | |
| 2018 | Super Sisters – Chalega Pyar Ka Jaadu | Siddhi Sharma | Sony SAB | |
| 2018 | Savdhaan India | Various | Episodic appearances | |
| 2020-2023 | Anupamaa | Pakhi Shah | Star Plus; main role; (later Pakhi replaced by Chandni Bhagwanani as Pakhi Shah Mehta) after time leap | |
| 2023 | Constable Girpade | Meenu Kelkar | Amazon miniTV; cop-comedy web series; premiered 6 October 2023 | |
| 2024 | Bigg Boss 18 | Herself | Contestant; Colors TV; mid-week eviction | |
| 2026–present | Pushpa Impossible | Shanaya Mehta Patel | Sony SAB; entered February 2026 | |

== Awards and nominations ==
=== Star Parivaar Awards ===
| Year | Category | Role | Show | Result | Ref. |
|---|---|---|---|---|---|
| 2023 | Favourite Behen | Pakhi Shah | Anupamaa | Won | |

== Public image ==
Bamne is widely recognized for portraying strong, outspoken, and emotionally driven characters. Due to the popularity of her role in Anupamaa, she has often been closely associated with her on-screen persona. In interviews, she has emphasized that her real-life personality differs significantly from the characters she portrays.

== Controversies ==
Bamne has largely remained free of major controversies. In 2022, she publicly responded to online trolling after a social media user made derogatory remarks toward her family, clarifying that her real personality should not be confused with her television character.

In 2023, following public statements by a former co-actor describing the working environment of Anupamaa as negative, Bamne defended the show’s production team and stated that she did not share those views.
