= Ajit Vachani =

Indian actor (1951–2003)

Ajit Vachhani
- Born: 10 August 1951; Mumbai, India
- Died: 25 August 2003 (aged 52); Mumbai, India
- Occupation: Actor
- Spouse: Charusheela Sable

Ajit Vachhani (10 August 1951 – 25 August 2003) was an Indian film and television actor. He had worked in many Hindi films as a character actor, including Mr. India (1987) (as "Teja"), Maine Pyar Kiya (1989), Kabhi Haan Kabhi Naa (1993), Hum Aapke Hain Koun..! (1994) and Hum Saath Saath Hain (1999), the two latter being some of his most popular and commercially successful movies of all time. He acted in over 50 films including the Marathi-language film Eka Peksha Ek and three Sindhi movies. He also acted in television serials including Hasratein, Daane Anaar Ke and Ek Mahal Ho Sapno Ka and Mitti Ke Rang.

== Career ==
Ajit started his TV career with Samvaad Video's Bante Bigadte (1985), produced by Rakesh Chaudhary, and soon become a popular face on the television and soon he was appearing in Hindi films.

Vachhani has acted in over 50 Hindi films, three Sindhi films and was a regular in Gujarati and Marathi plays. He acted in Sooraj Barjatya's Maine Pyaar Kiya, Hum Aapke Hain Koun and Hum Saath-Saath Hain. Other films of his include Mr India, Aankhen, Har Dil Jo Pyar Karega, Phir Bhi Dil Hai Hindustani and Kabhi Haan Kabhi Naa.

Vachhani's last serial, Ek Mahal Ho Sapnon Ka, ran for 1,000 episodes in Gujarati, Hindi and Marathi.

== Personal life ==
He died in Mumbai on 25 August 2003, at the age of 52, after a prolonged illness and was survived by his wife Charusheela Sable and two daughters.

== Filmography ==
=== Films ===
- Jhoothi (1985)
- Khamosh (1985)
- Mr. India (1987)
- Yeh Woh Manzil To Nahin (1987)
- Qayamat Se Qayamat Tak (1988)
- Commando (1988)
- Main Azaad Hoon (1989)
- Tridev (1989)
- Elaan-E-Jung (1989)
- Maine Pyar Kiya (1989)
- Eka Peksha Ek (1989) (Marathi film)
- College Girl (1990)
- 100 Days (1991)
- Hatyarin (1991) as Kailash
- Aag Laga Do Sawan Ko (1991)
- Khooni Panja (1991)
- Gruhpravesh (1992) (Marathi film)
- Jaan Tere Naam (1992)
- Jo Jeeta Wohi Sikandar (1992)
- Deedar (1992)
- Suryavanshi (1992)
- Raju Ban Gaya Gentleman (1992)
- Bomb Blast
- Kabhi Haan Kabhi Naa (1993)
- Lootere (1993)
- Roop Ki Rani Choron Ka Raja (1993)
- Dil Ki Baazi (1993)
- Apaatkaal (1993) as Advocate Moolchandani
- Chhoti Bahoo (1994)
- Dilwale (1994)
- Beta Ho To Aisa (1994)
- Hum Aapke Hain Koun..! (1994)
- Policewala Gunda (1995)
- Ahankaar (1995)
- Aisi Bhi Kya Jaldi Hai (1996)
- Yash (1996)
- Kaalia (1997) as Home Minister
- Naseeb (1997)
- Phool Bane Patthar (1998) as D.I.G. Khanna
- Double Gadbad (1999) as A.C.P. Singh
- Teri Mohabbat Ke Naam (1999)
- Sirf Tum (1999)
- Hum Saath-Saath Hain: We Stand United (1999)
- Har Dil Jo Pyar Karega (2000)
- Kyo Kii... Main Jhuth Nahin Bolta (2001)
- Jodi No.1 (2001)
- Aankhen (2002)
- Tada (2003)

=== Television ===
Year	Serial	Role	Channel
1987	Chunauti		DD National
1987	Mujrim Hazir		DD National
1988	Bharat Ek Khoj	Tarachand in episode 34, "Golden Hind"	DD National
1990	Hasratein	Govind Sahai	Zee TV
1994–1995	Daane Anaar Ke		DD National
1994–1998	Junoon	KK's father	DD National
1996	Hum Hindustani	Mr. Advani	DD National
1997–1998	Zanjeerein		
1998–1999	Gudgudee	Mohan Shukla	
1999	Mitti Ke Rang		DD National
1999–2002	Ek Mahal Ho Sapno Ka	Purushottam Nanavati	Sony TV
2000–2001	Babul Ki Duwayen Leti Jaa	Govind, Naina's father	Zee TV
2003	Ghar Sansaar	Balraj Chaudhary	DD National
