= Midgets vs. Mascots =

- Directed by: Ron Carlson
- Written by: Kevin Andounian
- Produced by: Brad Keller; Terry Mann; Joey Stewart
- Starring: Gary Coleman; Scottie Pippen; Jason Mewes; Ron Jeremy; Akie Kotabe; Mark Hapka; Paul Rae
- Cinematography: Marc Carter
- Edited by: Christian Hoffman; Mike Mendez
- Distributed by: First Look Studios
- Release date: 2009
- Running time: 85 minutes
- Country: United States
- Language: English

Midgets vs. Mascots is a 2009 direct to video mockumentary film. It is notable for being the last film appearance of former Diff’rent Strokes child star Gary Coleman before his death in May 2010.

== Plot ==
Ten contestants consisting of five little people and five mascots compete in a series of competitions for ten million dollars in prize money.

== Cast ==
- Gary Coleman
- Scottie Pippen
- Jason Mewes
- Ron Jeremy
- Akie Kotabe
- Richard Howland
- Mark Hapka
- Brittney Powell
- Paul Rae
- Russell
- Bob Bledsoe
- Kayla Carlyle
- Joe Gnoffo
- Josh Sussman
- Leamone
- Richard Trapp
- P.J. Marino
- Terra Jole
- Steve Krieger
- Laura Pippen
- Preston Pippen
- Justin Pippen
- Tava Smiley
- Amanda Durbin
- Victoria Hines
- Normita Joven
- Jacqueline Kradin
- Jean Claude Kradin
- Sasha Snow
- Annette Algoso
- Gabriel D. Angell
- Geoffrey Betts
- Donny Boaz
- Tyler Brockington
- Stephen Brodie
- James Burleson
- Jenna Burris
- Kimberly Lynn Campbell
- Craig Cole
- Skai Dabney
- Brian Dakota
- Phillip-Charlie Daniell
- Gerardo Davila
- Jill Deramus
- Gary Eoff
- Nathan Fane
- Joe Francis
- Jayk Gallagher
- Ryan Gunn
- Robert Hayes
- Christopher Holt
- Kevin Holt
- Nicole Holt
- Mario Jimenez
- Michael S. Koenig
- Sunny Lane
- William Lanier
- Lon Lawson
- Tiffany McManus
- Mario Mims
- Kylie Moro
- François Nguyen
- Nic Novicki
- Jack O'Donnell
- Liam Owen
- Asa Patrick
- Collin Patrick
- Heda Patrick
- Ian Patrick
- Laurel Penn
- Jordan Prentice
- Lindsey Rayl
- Rhonda Reeves
- Reece Rios
- Ryan Daniel Rodriguez
- Scott Roland
- Brandy Schaefer
- Andrew Sensenig
- Mehul Shah
- Juanita Stone
- Preston Strother
- Anna Elisabeth Taylor
- James Michael Taylor
- Lianna Taylor
- Stephen Monroe Taylor
- Shain E. Thomas
- Drew Rin Varick
- Cha'liya Vertison
- Tamara Voss
- Austin Walker
- Drew Waters
- Farah White
- Steven Whitemon
- Joshua Wilkins
- Morgane Wood

== Reception ==
The film was panned by critics. On the review aggregator website Rotten Tomatoes, 0% of 9 critics' reviews are positive, with an average rating of 2.8/10.
