= Sarita Joshi =

Indian actress

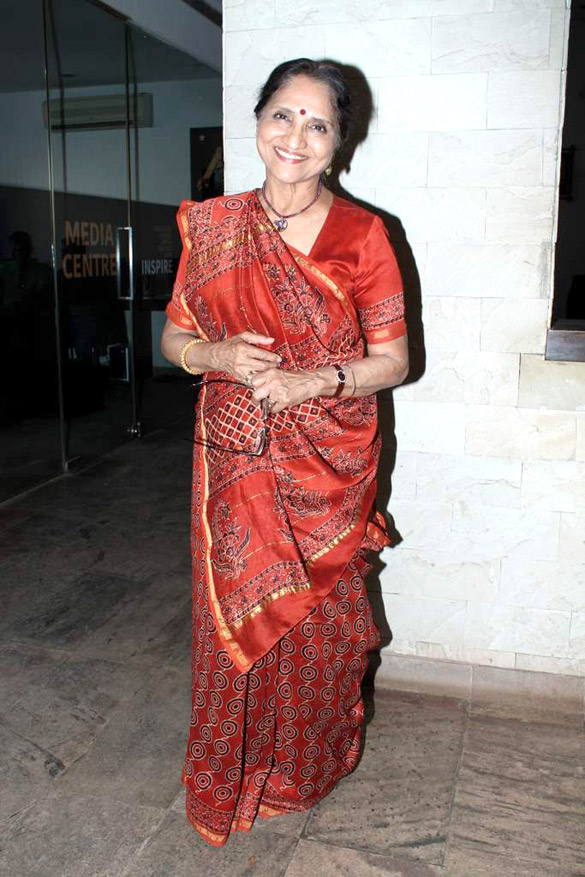
- Born: Sarita Bhosle; 17 October 1941 (age 84); Pune, Bombay Presidency, British India (present-day Maharashtra, India)
- Occupation: Actress
- Years active: 1950–present
- Spouses: Rajkumar Khatau (m. 1957; div. 1958); Pravin Joshi (m. 1958; died 1979)
- Children: Ketki Dave; Purbi Joshi
- Relatives: Roy–Joshi–Irani–Desai family

Sarita Joshi (née Bhosle; born 17 October 1941) is an Indian actress. Cited amongst the finest and most significant actors of Gujarati and Marathi theatre, Joshi is known for her Gujarati plays done with her husband Pravin Joshi in the 1970s. She garnered widespread recognition for her role as the matriarch Godavari Thakkar in the Star Plus hit dramedy Baa Bahoo Aur Baby (2005–2010). In 1988, she was awarded the Sangeet Natak Akademi Award for Acting in Gujarati by the Sangeet Natak Akademi, India's National Academy of Music, Dance & Drama. In 2020, she has been awarded with Padma Shri, India's fourth highest civilian award for her contribution in Art. She was recently seen in (2019) Zee TV's Hamari Bahu Silk as a hard-working business woman who hates films especially 'A' grade films. Sarita Joshi was seen on Anupama: Namaste America, a prequel web series to the Star Plus show Anupamaa in 2022.

She is currently playing the character of Radha Limaye aka Radha Tai/Kaku in Sony Sab's Pushpa Impossible.

== Early life ==
Sarita was born in a middle class Marathi family in Pune, on 17th October 1941, though she grew up in Vadodara. Her father, Bhimrao Bhosle, was a barrister and mother, Kamlabai Rane, was from Goa. She began acting on stage at the age of nine along with her sister Padmarani, due to financial problems that her family found itself in. Though she started with traditional theatre, she soon started working with noted artists like Shanta Apte. She is often confused with her sister, Padmarani, who is also an actress.

== Career ==
After working as child actor for six years, Joshi got her first lead role at age 16. She went to act with Indian National Theatre Gujarati, and it was here that she met her future husband Pravin Joshi.

She made her television debut in the 1980s, with the TV series, Titliyan (Butterflies), directed by Nadira Babbar, followed by numerous series in the 90s, including, Zee TV's Hasratein. She is best known for portraying Baa aka Godavari Labhshankar Thakkar a tough yet fair and loving matriarch in the household hit serial Baa Bahoo Aur Baby in which she was cast opposite a renowned theatre, film and television actor Arvind Vaidya with whom she also did the play named Masala Mami, which stopped on 28 March 2009 for a temporary seasonal break, but was renewed on popular demand. It is a popular show among masses and is still loved by the audience and are waiting for its next season. It ran for five years on television owing to its cast, storyline and performances. In 2009, Joshi played in the serial Kuchh Kook Hota Hai as Rani on 9X. Joshi played Asha Parekh's friend in the movie Kanyadaan in 1968 and also appeared in the song "Mil Gaye Milgaye Aaj Mere Sanam" from the same film. Joshi played Vijayanthimala's friend in the movie Pyar Hi Pyar in 1969. She also portrayed Abhishek Bachchan's mother in Guru, directed by filmmaker Mani Ratnam. She also played a central character in the 2008 movie Dasvidaniya. Joshi then travelled to the United States that year to be part of the crossover film, Bollywood Beats, starring alongside Lilette Dubey and Pooja Kumar, in a film directed by Mehul Shah. Out of all the mediums, she holds a special corner for theatre and stage performances. She claims that the joy of performing on stage is any time better than anything else and that theatre will always be her first love.

She stars in Star Plus' Chand Chupa Badal Mein, which is produced by Rajan Shahi as the caring, confident grandmother of female lead Nivedita, played by Neha Sargam. Her film Gangoobai has been released in theatres in January 2013 in which she plays the protagonist. She appeared in Meri Aashiqui Tumse Hi in 2015 as female lead (Radhika Madan's) grandmother aka Hansa Govardhan Parekh. She was also seen playing the character of Lalita Swamy "Amma" and as "daadi maa" in the episodic story 9 saal ki dadi maa in Sab TV's serial Khidki. She played the character of Bakula - the lead role in the &TV serial Bakula Bua Ka Bhoot in 2017.She also played cameo as Champa Kaki in (2005–2006) Star Plus's Khichdi Returns.

She played the character of Subhadra in the Colors TV show Silsila Badalte Rishton Ka (2018). She was seen in Zee TV's Hamari Bahu Silk (2019) in pivotal role as Aruna Parekh aka Baa— a wealthy and hardworking business woman who hates films especially 'A' grade films, she was also reunited with her onscreen son (Subodh) played by Rajesh Kumar in Baa Bahoo Aur Baby after 9 years on television.

== Personal life ==
Joshi was first married to Rajkumar Khatau. Later, she married theatre director and playwright Pravin Joshi. She is the mother of actresses Ketki Dave, who played the role of Daksha in Kyunki Saas Bhi Kabhi Bahu Thi and of Purbi Joshi, who appears on Comedy Circus as a host. Aruna Irani is her sister's niece from husband side. Her niece is Manasi Joshi Roy (wife of Rohit Roy) and nephew is actor Sharman Joshi (son in law of Prem Chopra), son of theatre veteran Arvind Joshi.

== Plays ==
- Ame Paranyaa (1948-50)
- Aaj ni Vaat (1948-50)
- Dil ki Pyaas, Aankh ka Nasha
- Ra Mandalik
- Malavpati Munj
- Prithvi Raaj Chauhan
- Kuleen Kanya
- Bal Kanaiyo
- Gunhegaar
- Inquilaab (Hindi)
- Anokhi Pooja
- Mangal Moorty
- Jojo Moda Na Padaota (1962)
- Prithvi Vallabh
- Saccha Bola Jutha Laga
- Balwant ni Baby
- Moti Veraana Chok ma
- Mograna Saap (1963)
- Chandarvo (1963)
- Saptapadi
- Veni Ma Char Phool
- Evam Indrajit
- Dhummas
- Sapna na Vavetar
- Sahebo Gulab no Chod
- Kaanch no Chandramaa
- Vaishaki Koyal
- Sharat
- Manju Manju
- Santu Rangili (1973)
- Kumarni Agashi (1975)
- Mausam Chalke
- Lady Lalkunwar
- Savita Damodar Paranjpe
- Do Diwane Shaher Mein
- Devki
- Gup Chup Gup Chup
- Sakha Sahiyara (also directed by her)
- Wrong Number
- Sambhav Asambhav
- Masala Mami (Gujarati)– with Arvind Vaidya and Disha Vakani in the cast
- Avsar Aavi ne Ubho Aangane
- Tu Chhe Lajawaab(2012)
- Ladies Special (2017)
- Sakubai (Hindi)
- Shyamchi Aai (Marathi)

== Filmography ==
=== Television ===
Year	Title	Role	Notes
1989	Titliyan		
1993	Junoon	Ranibai	Episodes 1–3
1993	Hasratein	Shanta Ben	
1999–2002	Ek Mahal Ho Sapno Ka.	Sumitra	
2000	CID	Suhasini Khandra	2 episodes
2005	Khichdi	Champa Kaki	Guest appearance
2005–2010	Baa Bahoo Aur Baby	Godavari Labhshankar Thakkar	
2009	Kuch Kook Hota Hai	Rani	
2010–2011	Chand Chupa Badal Mein	Naintara Sharma	
2012	Savdhaan India		Season 1; Episode 209
2012	Byaah Hamari Bahoo Ka	Tuljabai Dolkar	
2013	Adaalat	Kavita	
2013	Bh Se Bhade	Kalyani Joshi	
2014–2016	Meri Aashiqui Tumse Hi	Hansa Govardhandas Parekh	
2016	Khidki	Lalita Swami / Gomati	
2017	Bakula Bua Ka Bhoot	Bakula	
2017	Ayushman Bhava	Payal	Herself
2018	Silsila Badalte Rishton Ka	Subhadra	Cameo
2018	Khichdi	Champa Kaki	Guest
2019	Hamari Bahu Silk	Aruna Parekh	
2022–present	Pushpa Impossible	Radha Kulkarni Limaye	

=== Films ===
Year	Title	Role	Language
1967	Parivar	Amba	Hindi
1968	Kanyadaan		Hindi
1972	Janam Tip		Gujarati
1974	Trimurti		Hindi
1983	Khamma Mara Lal		Gujarati
1988	Main Zinda Hoon		Hindi
1992	Karm Yodha	Mrs. Dasgupta	Hindi
2005	Nazar		Hindi
2006	Darna Zaroori Hai	Satish's Mother	Hindi
2007	Guru	Mrs. Desai	Hindi
2008	Dasvidaniya	Maa	Hindi
2009	Bollywood Beats	Vina	English
2010	10ml LOVE		Hindi
2013	Gangoobai	Gangoobai	Hindi
2014	Singham Returns	Mrs. Jadhav	Hindi
2016	Samuel Street	Sarita Joshi	English
2018	Simmba	Bharti Ranade	Hindi
2021	Roohi	Budhiya	Hindi
2023	12th Fail	Dadi	Hindi

=== Web series ===
Year	Title	Role	Notes	Ref.
2021	Metro Park 2	Mummy		
2022	Anupama: Namaste America	Moti Baa		
2026	Chiraiya	TBA	JioHotstar series	

== Awards ==
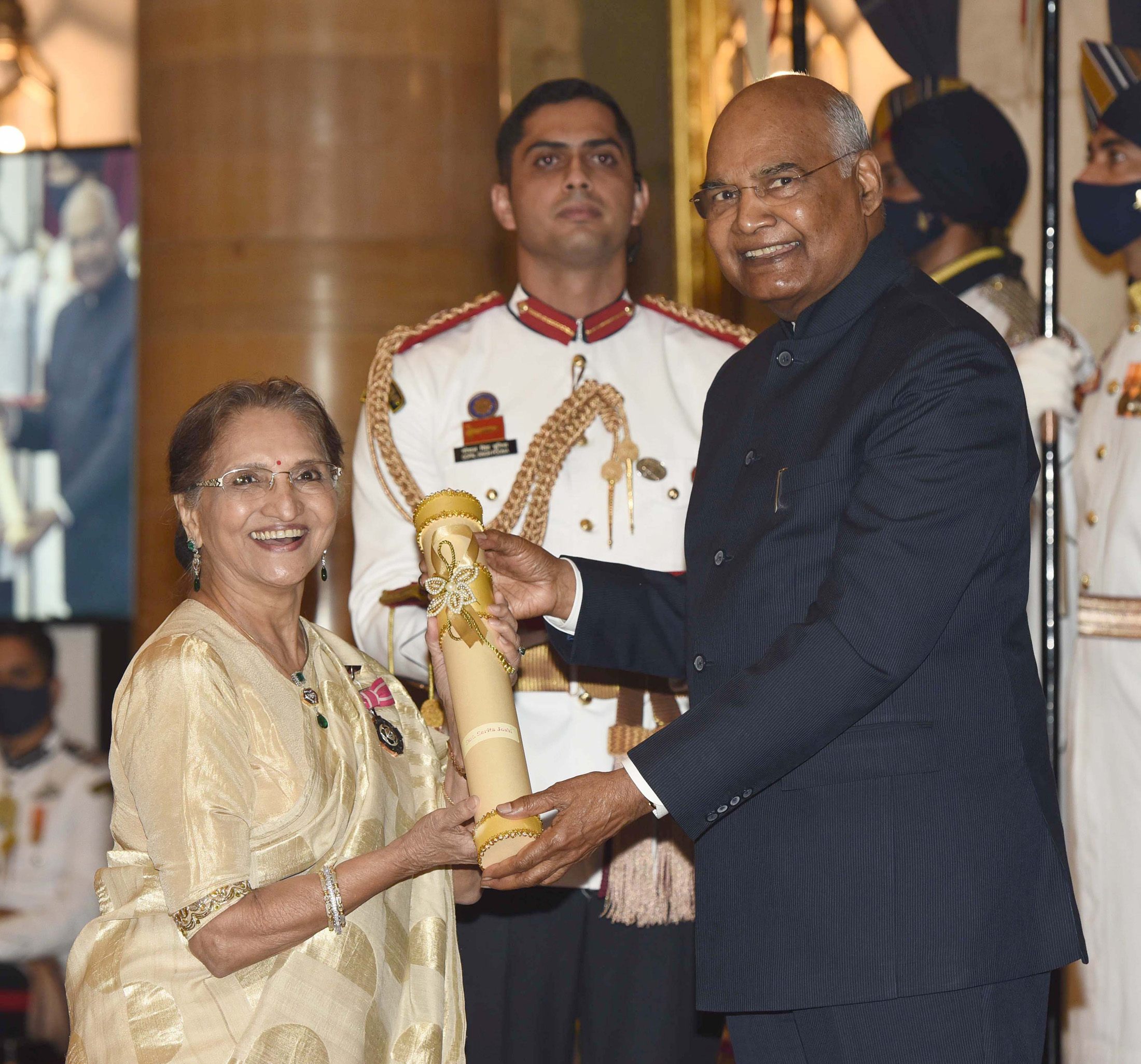
Joshi being awarded Padma Shri, c. 2021

- In 2020, the Government of India honoured her with the Padma Shri, the fourth highest civilian award in the Republic of India.
- In 1988, she was awarded the Sangeet Natak Akademi Award for Acting in Gujarati. In 2007, for her role as Godavari Labhshankar Thakkar in Baa Bahoo Aur Baby, she was awarded a Best Actress in a Drama award by the IDEA Indian Television Academy Awards.

Other awards include:

- Lifetime Achievement Award for Gujarati Theatre in 2007 by Transmedia (Organization felicitating artist on Gujarati Theatre & TV)
- Mumbai Nagar Palika – Gold Medal
- Marathi Natya Parishad – 1988
- Maharashtra Gaurav Puraskar – 1990
- Bank of India- Utkrushta Puraskar – 1997–98
- Indo-American Society Award for Excellence – 1998
- Gujarat Government Award – 1998
- Bruhad Mumbai Gujarati Samaj – 2000
- National School of Drama – (Delhi 2001)
- RAPA Award – 2008
- Jeevan Gaurav Puraskar – 2010
- Dhirubhai Thakar Savyasachi Saraswat Award (2023)
