= Purbi Joshi =

Indian film and television actress (born 1974)

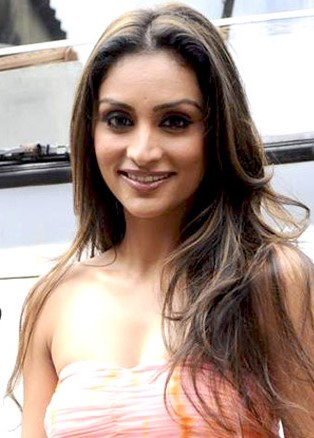
- Joshi at the shooting of Damadamm!
- Born: Bombay, Maharashtra, India
- Occupations: Actress, Voice actress, Television Presenter
- Years active: 1995–2021
- Known for: Hosting Comedy Circus
- Spouse: Valentino Fehlmann (m. 2014)
- Children: 1
- Parent(s): Pravin Joshi (father); Sarita Joshi (mother)
- Relatives: Ketki Dave (sister); Sharman Joshi (cousin); Manasi Joshi Roy (cousin)

Purbi Joshi is an Indian television actress and voice-dubbing actress who speaks Hindi, comedian, performer and anchor of television shows.

== Biography ==
Purbi Joshi is a daughter of actors Pravin Joshi and Sarita Joshi. She is a sister of Ketki Dave. There was a pressure to pursue the career of acting due to it being present in her family for generations.

== Television career ==
In 1995, Purbi got her first break in the television show Faasle.

Purbi started her career as a model in commercials for brands like Happy Dent chewing gum, Nirma Washing Powder, and Thompson Television. She did lead role in Doordarshan TV series Dishayein. She did double role of twin sisters.

In 2008, she participated in Mr. & Miss TV, a celebrity talent competition which she won and was declared "Miss TV". She is most well known for her association with the Comedy Circus. Purbi hosted several seasons of Comedy Circus and performed as a member of the principal cast. Purbi was also a part of MTV India's first spoof film of the Bollywood franchise Dhoom in the television movie, Ghoom.

She appeared as a Gujarati Indian American working family lady in Metro Park.

== Film career ==
She was part of an ensemble cast in the film Dasvidaniya released in 2008. She was part 2011 film Damadamm! as lead. She also lend her voice for the song, "Umrao Jaan" in the film.

== Filmography ==
=== Films ===
Year	Film	Role
2006	Ghoom	Sun tanned, moon shined girl
2008	Dasvidaniya	Garima
2010	Sky Ki Umeed	
2011	Damadamm!	Shikha
2019	Hala	Eram Masood

=== Television shows ===
Year	Series	Role	Notes
1995	Faasle		
2000–2002	Mehndi Tere Naam Ki	Nikki	
2001–2006	Dishayen	Nikita/Neha	Double role
2004–	The Great Indian Comedy Show	Various roles	
2008	Mr. & Ms. TV	Herself	Reality Show
2008–2012	Hamari Devrani	Daksha Deepak Patel	
2008	Comedy Circus Kaante Ki Takkar	Host	
2009	Comedy Circus - Chinchpokli To China	Host	
2010	Comedy Circus Ka Maha Sangram	Host	
2012	Kahani Comedy Circus Ki	Participant	
2012–2013	Comedy Circus Ke Ajoobe	Participant	
2014	Comedy Classes	Hawa Hawai	

=== Web series ===
Year	Show	Role	Notes
2019–2021	Metro Park	Payal Patel	
