= Ek Mahal Ho Sapno Ka (TV series) =

Indian television series

- Created by: Divya Drishti Tele Network
- Written by: Aatish Kapadia
- Directed by: Vipul Shah
- Starring: See Below
- Opening theme: Ek Mahal Ho Sapno Ka By Vinod Rathod; Mahalakshmi Iyer
- Country of origin: India
- No. of episodes: 1000

Production
- Producers: Nilesh Mehta; Meena Gheewala; Shobhana Desai
- Running time: 23 minutes

Original release
- Network: Sony Entertainment Television
- Release: January 25, 1999 – November 29, 2002

Ek Mahal Ho Sapno Ka (transl. A palace of dreams) is a Hindi language Indian soap opera that aired on Sony TV. The show was a remake of Gujarati show on ETV Gujarati called Sapna Na Vavetar. It was the first Hindi-language fiction series to reach 1000 episodes.

== Plot ==
The story revolves around a Gujarati business tycoon, Purushottam Nanavati, who is the head of his joint family of four married sons. It focuses on the trials & tribulations that a joint family faces, whether it is due to the family members' separation or their union. In addition, it shows how the family members find ways to cope with these differences.

== Cast ==
- Ajit Vachhani as Purushottam Nanavati
- Dina Pathak as Dadi
- Kalpana Diwan as Anusuya Purushottam Nanavati
- Sanat Vyas as Sanat Purushottam Nanavati
- Zankhana Desai / Meghna Roy as Panna Sanat Nanvati
- Rasik Dave as Shekhar Purushottam Nanavati
- Ragini Shah / Pallavi Pradhan as Rashmi Shekhar Nanvati
- Rajeev Mehta as Sameer Purushottam Nanavati
- Apara Mehta as Parolata Sameer Nanavati
- Manoj Joshi as Abhay Purushottam Nanavati
- Vandana Pathak as Sonal Abhay Nanavati
- Suchita Trivedi as Meenu Purushottam Nanavati (wife of Ketan Dalmiya)
- Supriya Pathak / Sejal Shah as Neelu Purushottam Nanavati
- Sarita Joshi as Sumitra, Rashmi's Mother
- Deven Bhojani as Raju Rajkotwala
- Deepak Gheewala as Parag Dalmiya, Meenu's Father-In-Law
- Rajni Shantaram as Saroj Dalmiya, Meenu's Mother-In-Law
- Shailesh Dave
- Swati Shah as Pallavi
- Dipesh Shah
- Darshan Jariwala as Vijay Saxeria
- Minal Padiyar a.k.a. Mansi Patel as Beena, Rashmi's Sister, and Mansi Saxeria
- Rita Bhaduri as Faiba
- Paresh Ganatra as Dheeraj, Raju's PA
- Trupti Bhupen
- Muni Jha as Bobby Anand
- Dinyar Contractor
- Vaishali Thakkar as Bharti
- Minal Karpe as Vasanti Ben
- Amita Choksi as Ganga
- Dhruvi Parekh as Riddhi
- Ravisha Parikh as Siddhi
- Dimple Shah as Gautami
- Arvind Vaidya as Gautami's father
