= Mehul Shah =

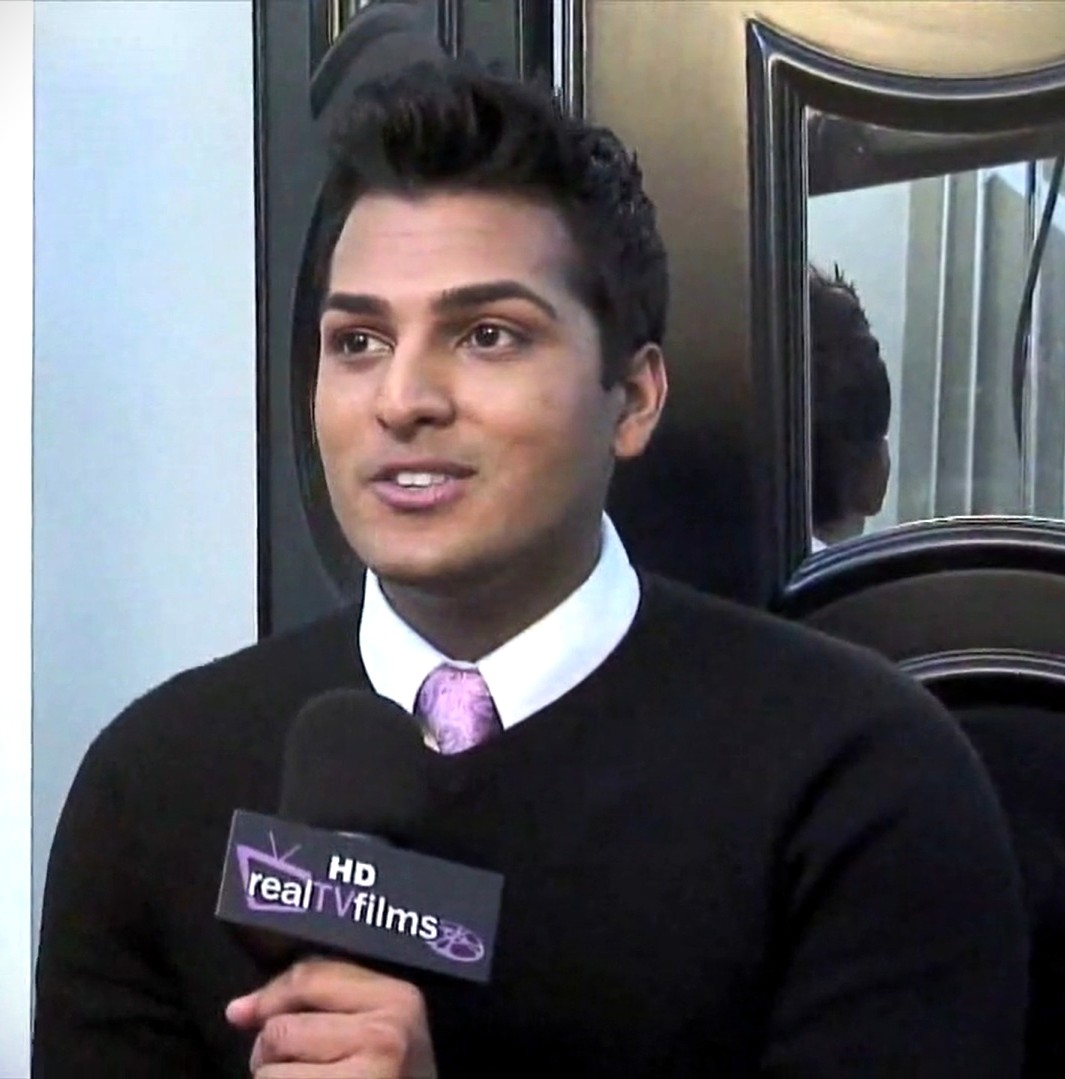
- Shah in 2009
- Born: Dallas, Texas, United States
- Occupations: Actor, Filmmaker, Director, Writer, Film Producer
- Website: Kinetik Films, LLC

Mehul Shah is an American actor, director, writer, and producer of Indian origin. He created his film production company, Kinetik Films right after he graduated from Southern Methodist University. His most notable works are Bollywood Beats, Nana's Secret Recipe, Explore Vegan ATX, and his co-starring role on Season 3 of the television series Homeland.

== Career ==
Mehul Shah began his love of performing and film at a very early age. After majoring in cinema in school, he decided to write and direct his first film, Diwali, which was an independent feature shot in Dallas. The story deals with three 20 something siblings, Anjali, Mihir, and Priti, who come back home during Diwali, the Indian New Year, and are forced to confront secrets that they are keeping from their families.

He then went on to write and direct a dance-comedy film titled Bollywood Beats, which starred Lillete Dubey, Pooja Kumar, Sachin Bhatt, and Sarita Joshi. He continued to produce films under his company, co-producing with SMU alum Wade McDonald on his film Hold Your Peace, as well as working on a documentary about hip-hop music in Dallas titled Tha Bridge, and producing the feature film Bug starring Gene Jones (actor).

His recent film Nana's Secret Recipe, was shot in Austin, Texas and is currently available on Amazon Prime, Tubi, and IMDBtv.

Mehul has also done commercial and print work for Dell, Comerica Bank, The Texas State Lottery, Chuck E. Cheese, Nokia, MTV India, J. C. Penney, and Motorola.

He is represented by Collier Talent.

== Filmography ==
Year	Film	Role	Language	Title
2003	Maybe Tomorrow	Jim	English	Actor
2004	Diwali	Mihir	English	Filmmaker/Actor
2009	Bollywood Beats	Vincent	English	Filmmaker/Actor
2010	Midgets vs. Mascots	Cashier	English	Actor
2010	Tha Bridge		English	Executive Producer
2010	Hold Your Peace		English	Producer
2012	Tied Up		English	Director/Producer
2013	Homeland #3.05	Aram	English	Actor
2013	Homeland #3.06	Aram	English	Actor
2014	Bug		English	Producer
2020	Nana's Secret Recipe		English	Director/Producer
2020	No Loss//No Gain		English	Associate Producer
2020	Explore Vegan ATX Web Series		English	Producer/Co-Host
