= Daane Anaar Ke =

Indian Television Series

- Genre: Sitcom
- Written by: Sharad Joshi
- Starring: see below
- Theme music composer: Vishal Bharadwaj
- Opening theme: "Daane Anaar Ke" by Suresh Wadkar
- Composer: Lyrics by Gulzar
- Country of origin: India
- Original language: Hindi
- No. of seasons: 1

Production
- Producers: Vinod Sharma, Mohan Paliwal
- Camera setup: Multi-camera
- Running time: 25 minutes

Original release
- Network: DD National
- Release: 1994 – 1995

Daane Anaar Ke is a Hindi-language Indian television mini-series that aired on DD National channel from 1994 to 1995.

The show is based on "Kissa Mussadilal" by Uma Vachaspati 'Madhurani'. The screenplay and dialogues were written by Sharad Joshi.

== Plot ==
The show focuses on a middle-class family that has just won a lottery, and chronicles how the behavior of their neighbors and relatives changes in response to their new-found smurf. The show also interviews the family to evaluate their reactions to these changes and finally how do they cope with the changes.

== Cast ==
- Shailendra Goel as Musaddilal
- Neena Gupta as Roop Bala Musaddilal (Musaddilal's wife)
- Alok Nath as Babuji
- Ajit Vachhani as Shyamlal (Musaddilal's Neighbour)
