= Sumeet Raghavan =

Indian Actor (born 1971)

Sumeet Raghvan
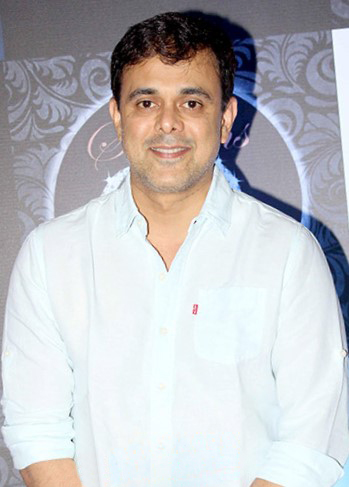
- Raghvan in 2017
- Born: 22 April 1971 (age 55); Bombay (now Mumbai), Maharashtra, India
- Occupations: Actor; Voice actor Producer
- Years active: 1986–present
- Spouse: Chinmayee Surve (m. 1996)
- Website: sumeetraghvan.com

Sumeet Raghvan (born 22 April 1971) is an Indian film, television, and theatre actor and producer known for his roles in Wagle Ki Duniya - Nayi Peedi Naye Kissey, Hudd Kar Di, Sarabhai vs Sarabhai, Sajan Re Jhoot Mat Bolo, Badi Doooor Se Aaye Hai, and Sarabhai vs Sarabhai: Take 2. As a child actor, he played the role of Sudama in Mahabharat serial of B. R. Chopra. He Was Nominated at Maharashtra State Film Award for Best Actor for Ekda Kaay Zala.

== Early life ==
Sumeet was born to Tamil father, R. Raghvan and a Kannadiga mother, Prema Raghvan.

== Personal life ==
Sumeet is married to actor Chinmayee Surve. They have two children, Neerad and Deeya.

== Theatre ==
Sumeet started his career with theatre in 1986. His play are Mala Bhet Havi Ho, Kabiracha Kay Karayacha, Rang Umaltya Manache, Jwalamukhi, Phakta Ekach Kaaran, Bomb-E-Merijaan, Lapandaav, Sakke Shejari, Lekure Udand Jhali, Ek Shunya Teen, Hamlet, Knock Knock Celebrity.

In 2026, Sumeet cofounded a theater production company, Natyaleela Theatres along his wife Chinmayee. He has produced and acted in Natyaleela Theatres' first Marathi Play ‘Hi Dosti Tutaychi Naay’ alongside Chinmayee. Sumeet And Chinmayee collaborated on a theatrical project together after almost 14 years.

== Filmography ==
=== Television ===
Year	Show	Role	Reference(s)/Note(s)
1987	Faster Fene	Faster Fene	
1988–1990	Mahabharat	Young Sudama	
1994–2000	Tu Tu Main Main	Driver	
1997–1998	Ek Do Teen	Various characters	
1999	Hudd Kar Di	Raju	
2000	Rishtey	Doctor Abhay Verma	Segment "Khel Khel Mein"
2002–2005	Sanjivani - A Medical Boon	Dr. Rajat Mehra	
2002–2004	Shubh Mangal Savadhan	Vinay Vanarveda	
2004	Bhagwan Bachaye Inko	Sid	
2004–2006	Sarabhai vs Sarabhai	Dr. Sahil Sarabhai	
2004–2006	Sarabhai vs Sarabhai	Nayesha Mazumdar Singh	
2006	Resham Dankh	Mr. Shantanu Balraj	
2008	Paani Puri	Vikas Puri	
2008	Say Shava Shava	Contestant	Winner
2009	Ghar Ki Baat Hai	Rajdip Yagnik	Nominated Best Actor in a Comic Role at 8th Indian Telly Awards.
2009–2012	Sajan Re Jhoot Mat Bolo	Apoorva Shah	Won Best Actor in a Comic Role Jury Award at Indian Telly Awards.
2009–2014	Jay Hind!	Host	Web Show
2010	Jhalak Dikhhla Ja Season 4	Host	
2011	Star Ya Rockstar	Contestant	
2012	The Late Night Show - Jitna Rangeen Utna Sangeen (Note: The show is a televised format of the Internet show "Jay Hind!".)	Host	Won Best Anchor Award at 12th Indian Television Academy Awards.
2012	Golmaal Hai Bhai Sab Golmaal Hai	Himself	Guest appearance
2013	Nautanki: The Comedy Theatre	Performer	
2014–2016	Badi Door Se Aaye Hain	Vasant Ghotala/9211	Nominated Best Actor in a Comic Role at Indian Telly Awards
2015	Taarak Mehta Ka Ooltah Chashmah	Vasant Ghotala/9211	Guest
2016	Raina Beeti Jaye- Jashn	Host	
2017	Sarabhai vs Sarabhai Take 2	Dr. Sahil Sarabhai	Web series
2018	India Ke Mast Kalandar	Host	
2021–2025	Wagle Ki Duniya – Nayi Peedhi Naye Kissey	Rajesh Wagle	
2021	Ziddi Dil Maane Na	Rajesh Wagle	Guest
2022;2023	Pushpa Impossible	Rajesh Wagle	Guest
2026	Chumbak	Dharmendra Kejriwal	

=== Films ===
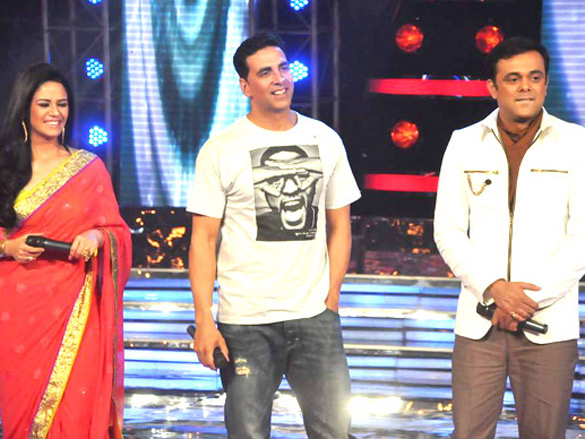
Raghavan (right) with Akshay Kumar (center) and Mona Singh (left) on sets of "Star Ya Rockstar"

Year	Film	Role	Notes	Ref(s)
2006	Ghoom	Inspector Vijay Dikshit		
2007	Saade Maade Teen	Himself	Cameo	
2008	U Me Aur Hum	Dr. Nikhil		
2009	Firaaq	Dr. Subhash		
2010	My Name Is Khan	Attacker		
2011	Kucch Luv Jaisaa	Shravan Saxena		
2014	Holiday	Sub Inspector Mukund Deshmukh		
2015	Sandook	Vamanrao Ashtaputre		
2018	Aapla Manus	Rahul Gokhale		
2018	Bucket List	Mohan Sane		
2018	Ani... Dr. Kashinath Ghanekar	Shreeram Lagoo		
2022	Ekda Kaay Zala	Kiran		
2025	Sangeet Manapmaan	Chandravilas		

== Dubbing roles ==
=== Animated series ===
Program title	Original Voice(s)	Character	Dub language	Original language	Number of episodes	Original airdate	Dubbed airdate	Notes
Aladdin	Jonathan Brandis and Jeff Bennett	Mozenrath	Hindi	English	86	5 September 1994 – 25 November 1995		
The Powerpuff Girls	Tom Kane	HIM	Hindi	English	78	11/18/1998- 3/25/2005	1999-2005	Aired on Zee TV and Cartoon Network.
The Batman	Kevin Michael Richardson	Joker	Hindi	English	65	9/11/2004- 3/8/2008		Aired on Cartoon Network.

=== Live action films ===
Film title	Actor(s)	Character	Dub language	Original language	Original Year release	Dub Year release	Notes
Blue Streak	Martin Lawrence	Miles Logan / Detective Malone	Hindi	English	1999	1999	
Rush Hour 2	Chris Tucker	Detective James Carter	Hindi	English; Cantonese Chinese; Mandarin Chinese	2001	2001	
Evolution	Orlando Jones	Professor Harry Block	Hindi	English			
Shanghai Noon	Owen Wilson	Roy O'Bannon	Hindi	English	2000	2000	
Shanghai Knights	Owen Wilson	Roy O'Bannon	Hindi	English	2003	2003	
Bad Boys II	Martin Lawrence	Detective Marcus Burnett	Hindi	English	2003	2003	
Harry Potter and the Chamber of Secrets	Christian Coulson	Tom Riddle	Hindi	English	2002	2003	

== See also ==
- Dubbing (filmmaking)
- List of Indian dubbing artists
