= Bakula Bua Ka Bhoot =

- Genre: Soap opera; Comedy
- Created by: Hats Off Production
- Written by: Aatish Kapadia.
- Starring: Sarita Joshi; Apara Mehta
- Country of origin: India
- Original language: Hindi
- No. of seasons: 1
- No. of episodes: 38

Production
- Producers: Jamnadas Majethia; Aatish Kapadia
- Production company: Hats Off Productions

Original release
- Network: &TV
- Release: 24 June – 5 November 2017

Bakula Bua ka Bhoot is a Hindi comedy drama that started on June 24, 2017 on &TV.

The show is about Bakula's family wanting Bakula to die because everyone in the house wants to do what they please. Mohit is the sensible one in the house. He loves Bakula Bua the most, more than his own mother. One day everyone prays to god that Bakula would die, and it happens. Bakula is now back on earth as a ghost and is going to get back at her family.

== Cast ==
=== Main cast ===
- Sarita Joshi as Bakula Raja a.k.a. Bakula Bua. She is the matriarch of the Raja Family who has a bossy and dominating nature that the whole family is tired of but besides that she is fun-loving and also cares and loves her family a lot. She addresses Lord Krishna her husband and also and treats him too. Vinay's sister, Rekha's sister-in-law, Shyam-Chandu-Mohit's aunt, Aditya-Megha-Munna-Malhar's grand-aunt, Rupal-Madhuri-Dhabbu aunt-in-law (protagonist).
- Apara Mehta as Rekha Vinay Raja. She tries to take the responsibilities of the house and family from Bakula. She is a silly and greedy woman who always goes to steal something but gets caught. She is adored and pampered by her husband. Vinay's Wife, Bakula's sister-in-law Mohit, Shyam, Chandu's mother, Rupal, Madhuri, Dabbu's mother-in-law. Munna-Malhar-Megha-Aditya's grandma.
- Deepak Parekh as Vinay Raja, Rekha's husband, Bakula's brother, Madhuri-Rupal-Dhabbu's father-in-law, Chandu-Shyam-Mohit's father, Malhar-Munna-Megha-Aditya's grandfather
- Aryamann Seth as Mohit Vinay Raja, Vinay- Rekha's son, Chandu- Shyam Brother, Rupal-Madhuri's brother-in-law, Dhabbu's husband
- Muskan Bamne as Dhabbu Mohit Raja, Mohits's wife, Vinay and Rekha's daughter-in-law, Rupal-Madhuri-Shyam-Chandu's sister-in-law
- Deeraj Kumar Rai as Chandu Vinay Raja, Madhuri's husband, Megha-Malhar-Munna's father, Vinay-Rekha's son, Mohit-Shyam's brother, Rupal-Dhabbu's brother-in-law
- Ragini Rishi as Madhuri Chandu Raja, Chandu's wife, Malhar-Megha-Munna's mother, Vinay-Rekha's daughter-in-law, Mohit-Shyam-Rupal- Dhabbu's sister-in-law
- unknown as Malhar Chandu Raja, Madhuri- Chandu's son, Megha-Munna's brother, Vinay-Rekha's grandson
- unknown as Megha Chandu Raja, Madhuri- Chandu's daughter, Munna-Malhar's sister, Vinay-Rekha's grandson
- Mihir Arora as Munna Chandu Raja, Madhuri-Chandu's son, Megha-Malhar's brother, Vinay-Rekha's grandson
- Tulika Patel as Rupal Shyam Raja, Shyam's wife, Aditya's mother, Vinay-Rekha's daughter-in-law. Mohit-Dhabbu-Madhuri-Chandu's sister-in-law.
- Amit Soni as Shyam Vinay Raja, Rupal's husband, Aditya's father, Vinay-Rekha's son, Madhuri-Dhabbu's brother-in-law, Chandu-Mohit's brother
- Rahul Rawal as Aditya Shyam Raja, Rupal-Shyam's son, Vinay-Rekha's grandson
- Rahul Rudra Singh as Shankar Bhagwan of Swarglok
- Lucky Mehta as Niyati Devi
- Amardeep Garg as Brahmadev
- Sudha Chandran as Guest Star
- Abraam Pandey as Narada
- Shraddha Dangar as ManiDadi
- Unknown as Chanchal
