= Damadamm! =

2011 Indian film by Swapna Waghmare Joshi

Damadamm
- Theatrical release poster
- Directed by: Swapna Waghmare Joshi
- Written by: Subrat Sinha
- Produced by: Himesh Reshammiya
- Starring: Himesh Reshammiya; Sonal Sehgal; Purbi Joshi
- Music by: Himesh Reshammiya; Sachin Gupta
- Distributed by: HR Musik Limited
- Release date: 27 October 2011
- Running time: 122 min
- Country: India
- Language: Hindi

Damadamm! (transl. Fun!) is a 2011 Bollywood romantic comedy film directed by Swapna Waghmare Joshi. The film stars Himesh Reshammiya, Sonal Sehgal and Purbi Joshi. Reshammiya plays a scriptwriter who is fed up with his girlfriend who always suspects him, though after she goes on holiday he openly parties and flirts with other girls. The real chaos starts once his girlfriend returns. The film was released on 27 October 2011, coinciding with the Diwali festival.

== Plot ==
Damadamm is about the life of Sameer, a writer who writes scripts for Indian films. He works with his girlfriend, Shikha, in the industry. Shikha is overly possessive over Sameer and suspects him all the time. Due to a specialty, Sameer cannot dump her either. He has no idea how to get rid of Shikha's suspicion, until one day her family invites her over for a relatives' wedding. She leaves for a few weeks, and until then, Sameer gets his total freedom. He drinks, parties, and even flirts with random girls. One day, a new girl, Sanjana, enters his office, and it is love at first sight for both of them. The two are then assigned to work together on a film, but Sameer has to be careful, as Sanjana is his boss' younger sister. Whilst working together, Sameer and Sanjana start to fall in love.

During this, Sameer even starts to ignore Shikha's phone calls. Getting fed up, Shikha arrives back home, and when she sees how close Sameer and Sanjana have gotten within 15 days, she gets jealous, causing an argument with Sameer, and the two break up. She then starts a friendship with Sameer after his boss arranges for Sameer and Sanjana's wedding. But before the wedding, Sameer eventually realises he truly loved Shikha and cannot live without her, so he breaks the marriage with Sanjana. Therefore, his boss sacks him, whereas Sameer replies that he would rather pick his girlfriend Shikha than his work. Sameer manages to convince Shikha to give him another chance.

Later, the boss rehires both Sameer and Shikha and even throws them a party. (The film ends with celebrations and the song "Umrao Jaan").

== Cast ==
- Himesh Reshammiya as Sameer "Sam" / Babu
- Purbi Joshi as Shikhaa
- Sonal Sehgal as Sanjana
- Rajesh Khattar as Sameer's boss / Sanjana's brother
- Lily Patel as Lily Aunty

== Reception ==
Taran Adarsh of Bollywood Hungama gave the film 2 out of 5, writing, "On the whole, DAMADAMM isn't bad, but it isn't great either. Though it has a hit score to its credit and some endearing moments, it will have to rely on a strong word of mouth to withstand a mighty opponent (Ra.One)." Mayank Shekhar of Hindustan Times added, "This film actually has a darn good script".

Dainik Bhaskar reviews it as "The story is simple, predictable with pinch of humour and emotions. This love saga is something anyone would have watched millions of times, however, what's noteworthy is the placement of the sequences which are successful in letting the story be a simple one and not complicating it further".

== Soundtrack ==
Damadamm!

Soundtrack album by Himesh Reshammiya
- Released: 9 September 2011
- Recorded: 2011
- Venue: Mumbai
- Genre: Film soundtrack
- Length: 45:30
- Label: T-Series and HR Musik
- Producer: Himesh Reshammiya

Himesh Reshammiya chronology
Bodyguard (2011)	Damadamm! (2011)	Dangerous Ishhq (2012)

Damadamm! was called one of the top 11 soundtracks of 2011 by Bollywood Hungama

=== Track list ===
All music is composed by Himesh Reshammiya.

No.	Title	Lyrics	Singer(s)	Length
1.	"Damadamm"	Shabbir Ahmed	Himesh Reshammiya, Vinit Singh, Alamgir Khan, Palak Muchhal, Shabab Sabri, Sabina Shaikh, Rubina Shaikh, Punnu Brar	05:54
2.	"Umrao Jaan"	Sameer	Himesh Reshammiya, Purbi Joshi	04:12
3.	"Aaja Ve"	Shabbir Ahmed	Himesh Reshammiya	02:46
4.	"Madhushala"	Sameer	Himesh Reshammiya, Aditi Singh Sharma	04:50
5.	"Yun Toh Mera Dil"	Sameer	Himesh Reshammiya, Sadhana Sargam	02:58
6.	"Hum Tum"	Sameer	Himesh Reshammiya, Vaishali Mhade	05:49
7.	"Tere Bina"	Sameer	Himesh Reshammiya	05:57
8.	"I Need My Space"	Sameer	Himesh Reshammiya	05:04
9.	"Mango"	Sameer	Himesh Reshammiya, Aditi Singh Sharma	03:40
