= Ketki Dave =

Indian actress

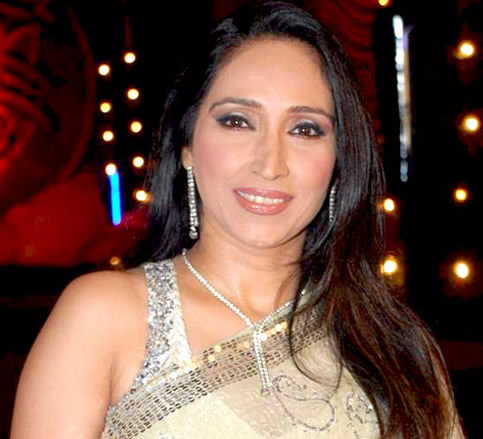
- Dave in 2010
- Born: Ketki Joshi; 23 June 1960 (age 66); Mumbai, Maharashtra, India
- Occupations: Actress, comedian, stand-up comedian
- Years active: 1983 – present
- Spouse: Rasik Dave (m. 1983; died 2022)
- Children: 2
- Parent(s): Pravin Joshi (father); Sarita Joshi (mother)
- Relatives: Purbi Joshi (sister); Sharman Joshi (cousin); Manasi Joshi Roy (cousin); Arvind Joshi (uncle)

Ketki Dave (Note: alternative spelling: Ketaki) (née Joshi; born 23 June 1960) is an Indian actress who mainly works in Hindi films and Hindi television and has also starred in many Gujarati films and theatre. She is widely popular for playing the character of Daksha Virani in the iconic tv soap opera Kyunki Saas Bhi Kabhi Bahu Thi, and its sequel Kyunki Saas Bhi Kabhi Bahu Thi 2 with her famous line "Aara ra ra ra". She has appeared in several films, including Aamdani Atthanni Kharcha Rupaiya, Money Hai Toh Honey Hai, Kal Ho Naa Ho, and Hello! Hum Lallan Bol Rahe Hain. She has worked in many television productions, including the reality shows Nach Baliye 2, Bigg Boss Season 2, and Behenein.

== Early and personal life ==
Ketki was born on 23 June 1960 to Sarita Joshi, an actress, and Pravin Joshi, a theatre director. She has a younger sister, Purbi Joshi, who is also an actress and anchor. She was married to the actor Rasik Dave. They met in 1979 during a common stage play and then married in 1983. Together they have a daughter Riddhi Dave and son Abhishek Dave. Riddhi is also a theatre actress. Rasik died on 29 July 2022 due to complications from kidney failure and was suffering for four years. Together, they ran a theatre company, Mudra.

She suffers from motion sickness.

== Career ==
Dave started her acting career when she was 13 years old, through Gujarati play Vaisakhi Koel as a replacement of one of the actresses, while she was accompanying her mother, Sarita Joshi, on a tour.

She appeared in various roles on the television, starting with Sai Paranjpye's serial Ados Pados in 1984. In 1996 got recognition in the show Hasratein on Zee TV. Her role in the show Kyunki Saas Bhi Kabhi Bahu Thi made her a household name, where she played the loud character of Daksha Virani, donning a big bindi. She left the show in 2001 but returned in 2007 and left again in 2008. She also played the role of Dr. Madhavi Dholakiya in Sanjivani which aired on Star Plus.

In 2006, she appeared on the celebrity couple dancing show Nach Baliye 2 along with her husband; but was the first couple to get eliminated. In 2008, she contested in the second season of Hindi Bigg Boss, where she was evicted on 26th day due to lack of public votes.

She reprised her role as Daksha Virani in Kyunki Saas Bhi Kabhi Bahu Thi 2 in 2025.

== Filmography ==
=== Television ===
All TV series are in Hindi, unless otherwise noted.

Year	Serial	Role	Notes	Ref.
1984	Ados Pados			
1995	Jeevan Mrityu			
1996	Aahat	Megha	Episodes 20 and 21: "Gambler" Part 1 and Part 2	
1996–1997	Hasratein	Mansi		
2000–2001; 2007–2008	Kyunki Saas Bhi Kabhi Bahu Thi	Daksha Virani	Nominated — Indian Telly Award for Best Actress in a Comic Role	
2001	Ye Dil Kya Kare	Revati		
2002	Sanjivani	Dr. Madhavi Dholakiya		
2006	Nach Baliye 2	Contestant	10th place	
2007	Comedy Circus 1	Contestant	Paired with Pratap Faujdar; voted out; replaced by Manini De in wild-card entry	
2008	Bigg Boss 2	Contestant	12th place	
2008	Comedy Circus - Kaante Ki Takkar	Contestant		
2008	Lo Ho Gayi Pooja Iss Ghar Ki	Rita Don		
2010–2011	Behenein	Nimafui		
2010–2011	Ram Milaayi Jodi	Ketki Masi		
2012	Aahat	Herself		
2012–2013	Pavitra Rishta	Snehlata Khandeshi		
2012–2013	Aaj Ki Housewife Hai... Sab Jaanti Hai	Sarla		
2014–2015	1760 Saasumaa	Ganga Katariya	Gujarati TV series	
2015	Maha Kumbh: Ek Rahasya, Ek Kahani	Thappadiya Mai		
2016	Tamanna	Baa		
2016	Naya Mahisagar	Diwaliben Mehta		
2017	TV, Biwi aur Main	Priya's mother		
2018	Silsila Badalte Rishton Ka	Herself, Nandini's Mother		
2019	Mere Sai Shradha aur Saburi	Kamla Tai		
2021–2022	Balika Vadhu 2	Gomati Anjaariya		
2022–2023; 2024	Pushpa Impossible	Kunjbala Parikh	Won — Indian Telly Award for Best Actress in a Supporting Role	
2025	Kyunki Saas Bhi Kabhi Bahu Thi 2	Daksha Virani		

=== Films ===
All films are in Hindi, unless otherwise noted.

Year	Film	Role	Notes	Ref.
1983	Kissi Se Na Kehna	Shyamoli		
1988	Falak	Julie		
1988	Kasam	Padma		
1990	Dil	Herself		
1999	Hogi Pyaar Ki Jeet	Shalini		
1999	Mann	Madhu		
2001	Aamdani Atthani Kharcha Rupaiyaa	Vimala	Nominated — Zee Cine Award for Best Actor in a Comic Role	
2002	Kitne Door Kitne Paas	Koki Patel		
2003	Parwana	Kamini Haryanvi		
2003	Kal Ho Naa Ho	Sarlaben Patel		
2005	Yaaran Naal Baharan	Geeta Thakur	Punjabi film	
2006	Love in Japan	Mrs. Mehta		
2007	Londonwali Se Neha Lagauli		Bhojpuri film	
2008	Money Hai Toh Honey Hai	Bobby's mother		
2009	Straight	Gujju Bai		
2010	Hello! Hum Lallan Bol Rahe Hain	Gujarati lady		
2010	I Hate Luv Storys	Simran's mom		
2016	Sanam Re	Visitor's wife		
2017	Pappa Tamne Nahi Samjaay	Sarla Mehta	Gujarati film	

=== Theatre ===
All plays are in Gujarati unless otherwise stated in the notes.

Title	Role	Written by	Directed by	Co-starring	Notes	Ref.
Ek Chatur Naar	Anjali	Imtiaaz Patel	Rasik Dave	Rasik Dave, Rajendra Butala		
Thank you Shivani	Neelam	Shailesh Dave	Rasik Dave	Riddhi Dave, Nayan Shukla, Suketu Mehta, Harikrushna Dave, Karan Mehta, Abhay Harpade		

== Awards and nominations ==
Year	Award	Category	Work	Result	Notes	Ref.
2002	Zee Cine Awards	Zee Cine Award for Best Actor in a Comic Role	Aamdani Atthanni Kharcha Rupaiya	Nominated		
2007	Indian Telly Awards	Indian Telly Award for Best Actress in a Comic Role	Kyunki Saas Bhi Kabhi Bahu Thi	Nominated		
2025	Indian Telly Awards	Indian Telly Award for Best Actress in a Supporting Role	Pushpa Impossible	Won		
