= Pushpa Impossible =

2022 Indian Hindi-language drama television series

- Genre: Drama
- Created by: Jamnadas Majethia
- Screenplay by: Rajesh Joshi; Shabia Walia
- Directed by: Pradeep Yadav; Nitin Patil
- Creative director: Nirav Vaidya
- Starring: See below
- Country of origin: India
- Original language: Hindi
- No. of seasons: 1
- No. of episodes: 1,396

Production
- Producer: Jamnadas Majethia
- Cinematography: Vijay Soni
- Editor: Aajay Kumar
- Running time: 22–26 minutes
- Production company: Hats Off Productions

Original release
- Network: Sony SAB; SonyLIV
- Release: 6 June 2022 – present

Pushpa Impossible is an Indian television drama series produced by Jamnadas Majethia under Hats Off Productions. The series stars Karuna Pandey Vaidya in the titular role and premiered on 6 June 2022 on Sony SAB and digitally streams on SonyLIV.

== Synopsis ==
The story revolves around Pushpa Randeriya Patel, a 45-year-old woman from Patan, who lives in the Bapodra Chawl of Mumbai with her children: Ashwin, Chirag, and Rashi. The show also focuses the life of Swara, an orphan whom Ashwin and Deepti adopted.

== Cast ==
=== Main ===
- Karuna Pandey Vaidya as
  - Advocate Pushpa Randeriya – Kanjibhai's daughter; Dilip's ex wife; Ashwin, Varun, Chirag and Rashi's mother; Ansh, Titli and Tushar's grandmother; Swara's adoptive grandmother (2022-present)
  - Hansika Jangid / Snigdha Suman as young Pushpa (2022) / (2022–2024)
  - Basanti Gupta: Pushpa's lookalike; Shikhar's ex-girlfriend (2024)
- Naveen Pandita as Ashwin Patel – Pushpa and Dilip's elder son; Varun, Chirag and Rashi's brother; Deepti's husband; Ansh and Titli's biological father; Swara's adoptive father. (2022–2025)
  - Samridh Bawa replaced Pandita as Ashwin (2025–present)
  - Abhay Pratap Yadav as young Ashwin (2022; 2023)
- Darshan Gurjar as Constable Chirag Patel – Pushpa and Dilip's younger son; Ashwin, Varun and Rashi's brother; Prarthana's widower; Shanaya husband (2022–2025)
  - Nitin Babu replaced Gurjar as Chirag (2025–present)
  - Riyansh Ayer as young Chirag (2022; 2023)
- Akshaya Hindalkar as Rashi Patel Trivedi – Pushpa and Dilip's daughter; Ashwin, Varun and Chirag's sister; Rishabh's ex-wife; Badshah's wife; Tushar's mother (2025–present)
  - Deshna Dugad as teenage Rashi (2022–2025)
  - Mahi Bhadra as child Rashi (2023)
- Garima Parihar as Deepti "Deepu" Parikh Patel – Sonal and Manish's daughter; Ashwin's wife; Ansh and Titli's biological mother; Swara's adoptive mother. (2022–2025)
  - Deeksha Joshi replaced Parihar as Deepti (2025–present)
  - Lavishka Gupta as young Deepti (2022)
- Indraxi Kanjilal as ASP Prarthana "Pannu" Bapodra Patel – Narhari and Sushila's daughter; Roshan's elder sister; Chirag's late wife (2022–2025)
  - Pooja Katurde replaced Kanjilal as Prarthana (2025–2026)
- Muskan Bamne as Shanaya Mehta Patel – Shantanu and Mansi's daughter; Chirag's second wife (2026–present)
- Siddharth Vakil as Saurabh Trivedi a.k.a. Badshah - Ravi, Badri and Panki's elder brother; Rashi's second husband; Tushar's stepfather (2026–present)
  - Hitul Pujara as teenage Saurabh (2024-2025)

=== Recurring ===
- Jayesh Barbhaya as Narhari Bapodra – Owner of Bapodra Chawl; Bharat's brother; Sushila's husband; Prarthana and Roshan's father (2022–present)
- Tulika Patel as Sushila "Sushi" Bapodra – Narhari's wife; Prarthana and Roshan's mother; Pushpa's best friend (2022–present)
- Sarita Joshi as Radha Kulkarni Limaye – Lakshman's daughter; Vinayak's widow; Pranav's mother; Mitali's's grandmother; Pushpa's mentor (2022–present)
- Bhakti Rathod as Sonal Parikh – Manish's wife; Deepti's mother; Ansh and Titli's grandmother; Swara's adoptive grandmother (2022–present)
- Sachin Parikh as Manish Parikh – Kunjbala's son; Sonal's husband; Deepti's father; Ansh and Titli's grandfather; Swara's adoptive grandfather (2022–2025)
- Amish Tanna as Mahendra Thakkar – A local shopkeeper at Bapodra Chawl; Golu's adoptive father. (2022–present)
- Hans Aslot as Gopal "Golu" Thakkar – Ayushi's son; Gaurav's step-son; Mahendra's adopted son. (2022–2025)
- Mansi Jain as Asawari Joshi Saran – Bhaskar's widow; Vikram's wife; Aarav's mother. (2022-present)
- Vikram Mehta as Bhaskar Joshi – Shobha's son; Ashwin's best friend; Asawari's first husband; Aarav's father. (2022–2024)
- Kavita Jadhav as Shobha Joshi - Bhaskar's mother. (2022-present)
- Sanat Vyas as Arvind Upadhyay – Pushpa's childhood teacher at Patan School. (2022–present)
- Chinmay Shivalkar as Munna Pandey – Chirag's friend. (2022–2025)
- Parthasarthi Vaidya as Kanjibhai Randeriya: Pushpa's father; Ashwin, Varun, Chirag and Rashi's grandfather; Ansh, Titli and Tushar's great grandfather; Swara's adoptive great grandfather; Pushpa and Jugal's mentor
- Aditi Bhagat as Manasi Raidhan – A stubborn and ambitious businesswoman; Shekhar and Vasundhara's daughter; Dilip's step-daughter (2022–2023)
- Jayesh More as Dilip Patel – Pushpa and Vasundhara's ex-husband; Ashwin, Varun, Chirag and Rashi's father; Manasi's step-father; Ansh, Titli and Tushar's grandfather; Swara's adoptive grandfather (2022–present)
- Deepali Pansare as Vasundhara Raidhan – Dilip's ex–wife; Manasi's mother (2023)
- Ketki Dave as Kunjbala Parikh – Manish's mother; Deepti's grandmother; Ansh and Titli's great grandmother; Swara's adoptive great grandmother (2022–2024)
- Jagat Rawat as Ashutosh Nanavati – Founder and Trustee at Nirmala Nanavati School; Pushpa's mentor (2022–2026)
- Adish Vaidya as Vikram Saran – Teacher at Nirmala Nanavati School; Rashi's mentor; Asawari's husband. (2022–2025)
- Pratham Bhatt as Sunny Bapodra – Bharat & Bharati's son; Narhari and Sushila’s nephew; Prathana and Roshan’s cousin (2022–2025)
- Saud Mansuri as Aryan Bharadwaj – Pramod's son; Rashi's enemy turned friend. (2022–2023)
- Dhruvansh Parmar as Parminder "Cheese" Singh – Rashi and Pushpa's classmate and friend. (2022–2024)
- Divyam Dubey as Sameer "Sam" – Rashi and Pushpa's classmate and friend. (2022–2024)
- Vrinda Duvani as Meghna – Rashi's best friend. (2022–2024)
- Neelam Singh as Neelima – Household help at Bapodra Chawal; Ramesh's wife. (2022-present)
- Neha Dandale as DCP Tejaswi Deshpande – Devi's friend and DCP officer (2022–present)
- Manoj Gupta as Inspector Manoj – Chirag's friend and employer (2022–2025)
- Urvashi Dholakia as Advocate Devi Singh Shekhawat – A criminal lawyer; Tejaswi's friend; Roshni's mother (2023–2025)
- Anshul Trivedi as Jugal Setalwaad – Shubhra's widower; Pushpa's childhood bestfriend; Viren's cousin; Kadambari's Husband (2023–2025)
  - Harsh Usdadiya Patel as Young Jugal (2023)
- Ravi Parmar as Binesh – Ashwin's friend turned Rival (2023-2024)
- Jya Mishra as Riddhi Ganatra – The News Spot; Chirag's friend (2023–2024)
- Hemant Kher as Viren Setalwaad – Patola Businessman; Jugal's cousin; Shubra's murderer (2023–2026)
- Utpal Dashora as Guru Bhasin; Dilip's rival and famous goon, Rashi and Roshni's kidnapper (2023–2024)
- Sampada Kulkarni as Varsha Limaye – Pranav's widow; Mitali's mother (2023–2024)
- Alisha Tunga as Mitali Limaye – Pranav and Varsha's daughter (2022,2024)
- Shahrukh Sadri as MLA Raj Patil - a politician of Jana Ganana Party (2023-2024)
- Pari Bhati as Swara Patel – Sarita's daughter; Deepti and Ashwin's adopted daughter; Ansh and Titli's adoptive sister (2025–present)
  - Vrihi Kodvara as child Swara (2024–2025)
- Aarya Dharmchand as Varun - Kavya's husband (2024–2025)
- Bhumika Chheda as Kavya - Varun's wife; Deepti's enemy (2024–2025)
- Nayan Bhatnagar as Badri Trivedi a.k.a. Stapler - Saurabh, Ravi and Panki's brother (2024–2025)
- Amit Shivade as Ravi Trivedi a.k.a. Chewingum - Saurabh, Badri and Panki's brother (2024–2025)
- Brinda Trivedi as Kadambari Mandaliya Setalwad- Jugal's widow turned murderer (2025–present)
- Hansika Jangid as Panki Trivedi a.k.a. Munni - Saurabh, Badri and Ravi's younger sister (2025)
- Gaurav Chopra as Professor Rajveer Shastri - Rohini's ex-husbund; Riya's father (2025–2026)
- Samveg Kaudan as Ansh Patel – Deepti and Ashwin's son; Titli's twin brother; Swara's adopted brother (2025–present)
- Bhoomi Ramola as Titli Patel – Deepti and Ashwin's daughter; Ansh's twin sister; Swara's adopted sister (2025–present)
- Pratham Walker as Roshan Bapodra - Sushila and Narhari's son; Prarthana's younger brother. (2025–present)
- Shrey Maradiya as Rishab Maheshwari - Bhavarlal and Madhumati'son; Rashi's ex-husband; Tushar's father. (2025–2026)
- Sejal Shah as Madhumati Maheshwari - Bhavarlal's wife; Rishab's mother; Tushar's grandmother (2025–2026)
- Nitin Vakharia as Bhavarlal Maheshwari - Madhumati's husband; Rishab's father; Tushar's grandfather (2025–2026)
- Deepak Pareek as Advocate Dakshesh "Dakku" Joshipura from Wagle Ki Duniya – Nayi Peedhi Naye Kissey (2025–present)
- Saptarshi Ghosh as Shantanu Mehta – Mansi's ex-husband; Shanaya's father (2026–present)
- Rasika Dhobale as Manva – Jagdish's daughter; Chirag's ex-fiance; Maulik's ex-girlfriend (2026–present)
- Vikas Basotra as Maulik – Manva's ex-boyfriend (2026–present)
- Raja Rupesh Singh Rajput as Constable Bharti - Chirag's friend (2026-present)
- Mukul Harish as Varun Patel: Pushpa and Dilip's second son; Ashwin, Chirag and Rashi's brother (2026–present)

=== Guest ===
- Kalpesh Chauhan as Advocate Kunal Asthana – Narhari's lawyer. (2022)
- Hemang K Palan as Jagdish – A local tailor; (2022-present)
- Mona Singh as Advocate Damini Mehra – Owner of Damini Mehra Associates; A social activist and reputed advocate of Mumbai; Shweta's mother; Pushpa's lawyer. (2022)
- Milky Shrivastav as Shweta Mehra – Damini's daughter. (2022)
- Sumeet Raghvan as Rajesh Wagle from Wagle Ki Duniya – Nayi Peedhi Naye Kissey (2022; 2023)
- Bharati Achrekar as Radhika Wagle from Wagle Ki Duniya – Nayi Peedhi Naye Kissey (2022)
- Sheehan Kapahi as Atharva Wagle from Wagle Ki Duniya – Nayi Peedhi Naye Kissey (2022; 2023)
- Amit Soni as Harshad Agarwal from Wagle Ki Duniya – Nayi Peedhi Naye Kissey (2023)
- Shatakshee Jain as Roshni Shekhawat – Devi Shekhawat's daughter. (2023)
- Gunjan Bhatia as Ayushi Agarwal – Golu's biological mother (2023)
- Dalip Gulati as Gaurav Agarwal – Ayushi's husband; Golu's stepfather (2023)
- Bhavya Gandhi as Prabhas Khanna: Raviraj's son (2024)
- Pragya Mishra as Sarita – Swara's biological mother (2024)
- Manish Khanna as Advocate Somnath Suryavanshi (2024)
- Mehul Kajaria as Dr. Jay Kamat – A neurosurgeon; Dr. Prabhakar Karnik's student (2024)
- Shruhad Goswami as Lord Krishna (2026)

== Production ==
=== Casting ===
Karuna Pandey Vaidya, Naveen Pandita, Deshna Dugad and Darshan Gurjar were cast in the leading characters of Pushpa Randeriya Patel, Ashwin Patel, Rashi Patel and Chirag Patel. In September 2025, Pandita quit the series, replaced by Samridh Bawa. In October 2025, the show took a six year leap following which many actors quit the show which included Garima Parihar, Darshan Gurjar, Indraxi Kanjilal and Deshna Dugad and were replaced by Deeksha Joshi, Nitin Babu, Pooja Katurde and Akshaya Hindalkar.

In February 2026, Muskan Bamne entered the show as Shanaya Mehta. In September 2026, Mukul Harish joined the show as Varun Patel, Pushpa and Dilip's long lost son

== Crossovers ==
Pushpa Impossible had multiple crossovers with Wagle Ki Duniya – Nayi Peedhi Naye Kissey, from 12 September 2022 to 13 September 2022, on 1 July 2023, on 9 September 2024 and on 14 September 2024.

It had a crossover with Itti Si Khushi from 24 September 2025 to 26 September 2025.

== Adaptations ==
| Language | Title | Original release | Network(s) | Last aired | Notes |
|---|---|---|---|---|---|
| Malayalam | Sudhamani Supera സുധാമണി സൂപ്പറാ | 12 June 2023 | Zee Keralam | 17 December 2023 | Remake |
