= List of Sarabhai vs Sarabhai episodes =

This is a list of episodes of the Indian television sitcom Sarabhai vs Sarabhai. The show had 70 episodes in Season 1 and 10 episodes in Season 2.

== Series overview ==
Series	Episodes	Originally released	
Series	Episodes	First released	Last released
1	70	1 November 2004	16 April 2006
2	10	15 May 2017	17 July 2017

== Episodes ==
=== Season 1 (2004–2006) ===
All episodes have been directed by Deven Bhojani.

No.	Title	Original release date
1	"Meet the Sarabhais"	1 November 2004
Sahil Sarabhai has run away from his house and has reached at a beach in Goa, away from his bothersome family. There, he meets a novelist, Nagesh Iyer. After a brief interaction, the story moves to Mumbai, where Sahil's family is introduced. By-and-by, Sahil describes past glimpses of each member of his family, thus describing their character traits. Finally, Nagesh ends up writing a book on Sahil's life. The latter takes this as an opportunity to show his family, about his obsession towards their incorrect behaviour towards each other. The attempt fails, and the family becomes even worse. Meanwhile, the episode ends on a note that the book is a hit, and Sahil MIGHT be running away, once again.
2	"Dr Acharya to the Rescue!"	8 November 2004
Maya is preparing a cake for her birthday. Indravadan comes in and teases her. On Sahil's arrival, Indravadan immediately reminds his son that his wife's birthday falls on the same day as that of Maya. Sahil lands in a dilemma as he commits to both Monisha and Maya, but cannot have dinner with both of them at a single time, keeping in mind the rivalry between the two women. Meanwhile, as Sahil plans to take Maya for lunch, on the pretext of taking her to the doctor (Dr Acharya), Indravadan comes up with a piece of false news, stating that Dr Acharya is a killer, who has murdered three of his patients. That way, Monisha is worried and creates even more chaos by ending up at Zodiac Bistro, where Maya is having lunch with Sahil. Sahil, on the other hand, has already asked his friend to pretend to be Dr Acharya. The result is that the fake and the real doctor, who has been purposefully called on by Indravadan, both end up at the Bistro, wreaking havoc. The confusing situation is handled by Sahil, who spills the beans that how he was unable to spend time with both the women of the house. At home, an emotional resolution takes place, and the episode ends with both the couples going for dinner at Zodiac Bistro. Guest Star: Gireesh Sahdev
3	"The family gets cricket fever"	15 November 2004
Monisha and Indravadan are very excited about watching final at Wankhede Stadium, but Maya does not approve of it because of their middle-class slogan. Indravadan tries to steal the tickets from his friend Jayant by inviting him to dinner. Maya finally gets two tickets. Indravadan eats paani puri and then gets Diarrhoea. Monisha fasts for his recovery. Maya bets with Monisha that it won't work. They bet the ticket. Finally, the match is postponed, which enables Indravadan to go to the match. When Monisha claims that she has won the bet, Maya refuses to accept it. They argue about it.
4	"Tiger Ya Tota?"	22 November 2004
The episode starts with Maya holding a party to collect fund for the poor, by drinking wine. Here, Maya's friend Sarita starts talking about various outrageous acts of her husband and claims that men are either tigers or parrots. Monisha supports Sahil; however, Sarita claims that even Sahil might be up to something. Meanwhile, Sahil is regularly flirted with by his female colleague, Dr Kiran. Meanwhile, Sahil's younger sister, Soniya, predicts a woman in Sahil's life. This enrages Monisha, who investigates and catches him with Kiran a.k.a. Shama. Meanwhile, Indravadan is also having an affair with another woman. His secret phone calls make Maya suspicious of her husband. Later, both the women complain about the respective extra-marital affairs of their respective husbands. However, both fake the case, claiming that they were simply trying to show the women how a tiger might behave. The episode ends with Sahil still being flirted with by Shama, and Indravadan gets a new phone, showing that he might indeed be having an affair with another woman, whom he calls by the name Sullu.
5	"Rosesh has a Hit Play"	29 November 2004
Rosesh is participating in a stage play written by Jaimin. Maya invites a critic for the play reading. Indravadan steals the script and makes inappropriate modifications using the gardener, servant and watchman. But the critic loves it. So Maya gets the gardener, servant and watchman to write the second act of the play.
6	"Remembering Popat Kaka"	6 December 2004
Maya's uncle Popatlal is sick, so she decides to go to Los Angeles to see him. Monisha gets excited because of a discount sale in the malls of LA. Sahil isn't able to travel because of a police case filed by a patient. Rosesh's visa gets rejected. But before they can travel, Popatlal dies. Maya decides to arrange a shradhanjali, but due to Monisha's old food, her throat gets sore. She is upset. So Monisha gets her Jalandhar Baba's well's water. After that, she completely loses her voice. Finally, Monisha sings at the Shradhanjali instead of Maya.
7	"Indravadan, inside a cupboard"	13 December 2004
Maya and Indravardhan have a tiff. To please her, Indravardhan buys her an old wooden wardrobe from a kabadiwala. Maya is disgusted and wants to throw it out, which upsets Indravardhan. Sahil assures him that Maya loves him. To prove it, he asks Indravadan to hide. When Maya is unable to find Indravadan, she becomes upset and calls Sonia to check Voodoo chart. Finally, because of Sahil's repeated singing of the same song, Maya finds the truth. To teach Indravadan a lesson, she calls and stages a drama with Kashyap where she plans to run away with him. Finally, Indravadan comes out of the wardrobe.
8	"Why should Men have all the Fun?"	20 December 2004
Maya and Monisha go out for some protests, so Sahil, Indravadan, Dushyant and Roshesh decide to party. Indravadan asks his friend to arrange a party. Unknowingly they end up with two beautiful girls who would dance and then massage them. They back-out and ask them to leave. The organizer, Babu wants them to pay the full Rs. 30,000. While they argue, Maya and Monisha return. After some slip-ups, Maya discovers everything. Finally, they enjoy the show as a family.
9	"Monisha Mends her ways"	27 December 2004
Monisha ends up sending an empty lunch box to Sahil's office. He is annoyed. To please him she makes him a meal, which is horrible. When he talks about that, she gets angry and fights with decides to leave the house. To teach her a lesson, he hires an attractive actress to play a maid. When Monisha sees the maid, she becomes very jealous and agrees to keep the house clean and take care of the other responsibilities also.
10	"The Scrabble Contest: Indu VS Maya"	3 January 2005
Maya challenges Indravardhan to a Scrabble competition when he makes fun of her when she wins a competition. Indravadan trains with Sahil's help and finally wins the competition.
11	"Maya Moves in with Monisha"	10 January 2005
Maya's sister, Vidheesha is coming to Mumbai. Monisha forces her to stay in her house. Maya wants to clean Monisha's house and plots to enter her house. Indravadan hears her and asks Monisha to spoil the plan by doing pest control. Finally Maya fakes illness and moves to Monisha's house. Indravadan fakes her report to scare her. Finally Vidheesha cancels her plan and Maya moves back to her house.
12	"Rosesh is in Love!"	17 January 2005
Roshesh falls in love with a high society girl, Maggie, who likes her pet more than Rosesh. She is vegan and Rosesh decides to do as she says. Maya is upset and then scolds him. Rosesh fights and leaves the house. Finally they broke up due to some issues with the pets and Rosesh returns home.
13	"Tit for Tat, Indu"	24 January 2005
Maya and Sahil play a prank on Indravardhan. Sahil helps Indravadan to prepare a drink and it is served to Dinesh who visits them for a chess match. Dinesh drops dead and everyone blames Indravadan for it. Ila Behen, Madhu Phoopha and Sarita arrive, they try to hide the fact that Dinesh is dead. When everything fails, Indravadan gets very tensed and Maya tells him that it was just a prank.
14	"Indu's new friend, Cookie Sharma"	31 January 2005
Maya treats Indravadan like a child and belittles his attempts to be romantic. While jogging, he meets actress Cookie Sharma. He is attracted to her and invites her to lunch. He tells Sahil that he is falling in love with Cookie. Sahil asks him to speak to Cookie. Indravadan discovers that Cookie sees him as her father. Heart-broken he comes home. Meanwhile Maya discovers hidden cookies at home and is upset with Indravadan. When he comes home, she asks him about Cookie, but he thinks she has found out about Cookie. Finally Indravadan realises that she is talking about Cookie and tell her that he needs some romance in their life. She agrees. Guest Star: Mandira Bedi
15	"Sonia's Vision Cause Chaos"	7 February 2005
Soniya makes a prediction about a woman's death with name starting with 'M' by 6:00 pm. The person will associated with glass and something black. Both Maya and Monisha are terrified.
16	"Rosesh gets Psychoanalysed"	14 February 2005
Rosesh has insomnia and it drives all the others crazy.
17	"Maya and Monisha wager a bet"	21 February 2005
Maya makes a bet with Monisha that men can't remember important dates. Then Maya sets to prove it.
18	"Sahil's New Car"	28 February 2005
Sahil buys a brand new Coyote car and Monisha and Maya fight to drive it first. On Indravadan's suggestion, Monisha takes out the car without telling Sahil and does an accident. Maya wanting to drive first cooks up a story about a sick child to drive the car. Rosesh while practicing for a beggar's role drops his lotta on the car. For the damage done by Monisha, Sahil blames Rosesh. Monisha confesses and Sahil forgives her.
19	"Indravadan on a Health Spree"	7 March 2005
Indravadan has borderline cholesterol problem and it is up to Maya to make him lose his flab and cholesterol. Maya forces him to exercise and Indravadan tries to get out of it. Finally he decides to work-out and becomes a health freak.
20	"How Sahil met Monisha"	14 March 2005
Maya explains to Dushyant how Sahil and Monisha met and how they fell in love and married. Sahil meets Monisha when asks for a lift. Then they become friends. But Maya arranges for Sahil's marriage with Sarita's daughter Priya.
21	"Sahil and Monisha getting Married"	21 March 2005
Monisha is also engaged to a vet. Later she realizes her feelings for Sahil and their marriage gets fixed.
22	"Who is Dinky?"	28 March 2005
Monisha finds Sahil's diary and discovers an affair. Sahil convinces her that he is innocent. Guest star : Manini Mishra
23	"Séance to connect to Baa"	4 April 2005
The building's lease papers are missing, so the building is about to be demolished. Soniya and her friend bring Ba's spirit in Monisha's body to find the papers.
24	"Baa Possesses Monisha"	11 April 2005
Sahil discovers that the whole spirit thing is a prank by Indravardhan and Monisha. He then decides to play a prank on them.
25	"Khichdi with Sarabhai – Part 1"	18 April 2005
Indravadan to invite Jayashree to his house for celebration of the International Family Week. He decides to invite Maya’s cousins also. Crossover: Khichdi
25	"Khichdi with Sarabhai – Part 2"	19 April 2005
Indravadan to invite Jayashree to his house for celebration of the International Family Week. He decides to invite Maya’s cousins also. Crossover: Khichdi
26	"Rosesh's Poetry Publication"	25 April 2005
Rosesh publishes a book of 110 poetries, Sahil and others criticize him. At last Sahil realises his mistake and motivates Rosesh to improve his poetry talent.
27	"Maya Hosts Baldev Singh"	2 May 2005
Maya invites Swaroopa and her husband Baldev Singh to her house for a party and ends up taking care of their spoilt doggy Dipender for a day.
28	"Rosesh-Indu fight over a Girl"	9 May 2005
Indravardhan and Rosesh decide to become friends.
29	"Sarabhais and Sunehri"	16 May 2005
Maya reluctantly agrees help a destitute girl as a maid to her house. She robs them. Guest star : Mallika Sherawat
30	"Dushyant and his unhelpfulness"	23 May 2005
Maya's mobile is defunct and flashbacks to the time when he repaired the fridge to convince Monisha why she should not tell Dushyant about it.
31	"Nilima and Sahil"	30 May 2005
Sahil and Monisha fight due to lack of Sahil's interest in Monisha. The reason for his inattentiveness is a crazy patient, Neelima Verma.
32	"Maya and her maids"	6 June 2005
Maya scolds her servants and they leave. The replacement smells and steals. Radhabai and Vittal also have troubles with alternate employment. Maya misses her old servants and hires them back.
33	"Sudhanshu paints Maya"	13 June 2005
Tired of playing mother and housekeeper, Maya decides to go out and when she returns, she has invited an upcoming artist, Sudhanshu, to her house, whose exhibition she went to see. Guest Star : Parvin Dabas
34	"Maya and Sudhanshu"	20 June 2005
Maya is ready to leave the house with Sudhanshu, but Sudhanshu is doubtful if she can leave Indravadan. Guest Star : Parvin Dabas
35	"Maya and Rationalism"	27 June 2005
Maya has bet with Indravadan that she can make fool of Sahil.Which results in Monisha threatening to leave the house but Sahil not stopping her to.
36	"Monisha's speech on Maya"	4 July 2005
The society is celebrating daughter-in-law day and Baldev proposes that Monisha should speak about her mother-in-law. Maya gets anxious about her speech.
37	"Sahil and Monisha to move to Delhi"	11 July 2005
Sahil and Monisha plan to shift to Delhi. Maya is scared that Sahil will become middle-class so she tries to stop them.
38	"Rosesh in a movie, Naya Don"	18 July 2005
Sahil is jealous of Rosesh when he gets a film offer. He is also upset because no one cares that he is being awarded for his sunscreen lotion.
39	"Monisha and Sahil's unromantic life"	25 July 2005
Monisha complains that Sahil is not romantic to her and their intimacy is lost. Maya decides to intervene and help. Sahil listens to a famous romantic poem by Anamika Thapar which boosts his hormones. Finally, Monisha and Sahil make love.
40	"Indravadan offends Dr. Siddharth"	1 August 2005
Indravadan makes fun of a famous hypnotist invited by Maya and in return the hypnotist hypnotises Indravadan to become Maya hilarious consequences follow. Guest star : Makrand Deshpande
41	"Indravadan in a Hypnotized state"	8 August 2005
Indravadan is finally out of hypnotism. He makes fun again, so the hypnotist makes him Rosesh. Guest star : Makrand Deshpande
42	"Maya, Monisha and Antakshari"	22 August 2005
Maya and Monisha play Antakshari as a challenge. Their friends help them. Guest star : Roop Kumar Rathod and Sonali Rathod
43	"Baldev and Sarupa's marital problems"	29 August 2005
Sarupa wants a divorce and Baldev does not. They come to Sarabhais for help.
44	"Rosesh is kidnapped"	5 September 2005
Rosesh is kidnapped for ransom and Indravardhan decides to bargain. When Rosesh finds out, he refuses to come home.
45	"Monisha, the Millionaire"	12 September 2005
Monisha's uncle Jaspal dies leaving behind expensive paintings and antiques for Monisha. Maya is outraged and tells Monisha to make use of the money by giving it to charity and not wasting it on discount sales. So they have a bet. If Monisha donates all the money and paintings she got from her uncle, Maya will donate 5 lakhs.
46	"Indravadan writes a play"	19 September 2005
Indravadan writes a play to show Maya that he can do something constructive. The actors goof up and the audience just laugh at them.
47	"Indravadan's 55th Birthday"	26 September 2005
As a birthday wish Maya gives Indravadan his bachelorhood. Sahil, Rosesh and Indravadan shift to Sahil's flat. Maya and Monisha stay in Indravadan's flat. The wish becomes disastrous when everything goes wrong.
48	"Helping Sharman Kapadia"	3 October 2005
Sharman, Sahil's cousin causes his friend's dad to have a heart attack three days before his wedding. When the police look for him, he decides to hide at Indravadan's house.
49	"Rosesh's Fake Marriage"	10 October 2005
To escape an arrange marriage with Ajanta (Sarita's niece), Rosesh confesses to Maya that he has a wife, Rita and a son, Daksesh.Maya is horrified by the news but afterwards she gets to know that it is a lie and proposes that Rita and Rosesh should get married officially.
50	"How Indravadan met Maya"	17 October 2005
The story of how Maya and Indravadan met in a party and fell in love.
51	"Maya, Monisha and Local Elections"	24 October 2005
To save her new pet, a goldfish, Monisha decides to stand against Maya in the society's general election. Sahil, on the other hand, is going out so he can avoid the elections. The results declared are that it is a tie but then Sahil comes and votes for Maya. Monisha is not disturbed because one night before the elections she gave her fish some Paneer and it died.
52	"Rosesh tries to get adopted"	31 October 2005
Rosesh discovers that Maya wanted to abort her 3rd child (Rosesh). So he decides to advertise for new parents.
53	"Monisha's date with Patang Kumar"	7 November 2005
Monisha wins a contest and TV actor Patang visits her home. Sahil is jealous because Monisha is smitten and Patang flirts with her. Guest star : Aamir Ali
54	"Indu-Rosesh's Poetry War"	14 November 2005
Rosesh challenges Indravardhan to a poetry competition.
55	"Monisha dreams of Maya"	21 November 2005
Maya loses her memory and becomes middle-class. Monisha loves it.
56	"Rosesh causes an accident"	28 November 2005
Rosesh hits a man and runs. Some social activists demand his arrest.
57	"Indravadan apologises to Sahil"	5 December 2005
Indravadan makes fun of Sahil publicly and they have a fallout.
58	"Indravadan Ousted from his home"	12 December 2005
Tired of Indravadan's childish activities, Maya throws him out of the house.
59	"Nayesha and Jugal's wedding"	23 December 2005
Maya's sister Nayesha and Monisha's cousin Jugalkishore visit. They fall in love.
60	"Indravadan–Rosesh wager a Bet"	30 December 2005
Indravadan tries to prove to Rosesh that women are always suspicious.
61	"Rosesh in love with Youyou"	6 January 2006
Rosesh falls in love with Youyou Khilawala. But Maya hates her mother. So he leaves the house to get married.
62	"Rosesh returns home"	13 January 2006
Rosesh breaks up with Youyou and returns. Maya tries to find him a bride.
63	"Kissme at the Sarabhais"	20 January 2006
Madhubhai's niece Kissme comes to live with Maya and Indravadan. Rosesh gets very friendly with her.
64	"Yamraj comes for Indravadan"	27 January 2006
Indravadan is visited by Yamraj. Maya begs and tries to save his life. This is later revealed to be a prank staged by Ramesh Shirke, from Rosesh’s theatre company, as a surprise for their wedding anniversary.
65	"Treasure Hunt Time"	3 February 2006
Sahil is invited by cricketer Vishal Guha for a party with a partner. Maya and Monisha fight to accompany him
66	"Monisha becomes sophisticated"	10 February 2006
On Maya's insistence, Monisha becomes sophisticated
67	"Monisha threatens suicide"	17 February 2006
Monisha decides to commit suicide. Maya celebrates.
68	"The Midas Chant's Magic"	24 February 2006
Dushyant gives Sahil an African Chant to recite. After that everything, Sahil wishes happens. Guest Star : Parmeet Sethi
69	"Brides for Rosesh"	3 March 2006
A psychic predicts that Rosesh should marry within a month or he will have to wait for 51 years. Rosesh freaks out
70	"Crystal Ball Time"	16 April 2006
Another psychic show the Sarabhais their future in a crystal ball. All comes out to be good till they receive a shock for their future in the following 7 years. Guest Star : Rohitash Gaud and Siddhartha Jadhav

=== Season 2 (2017) ===
The new season returned in May 2017 on Hotstar as a web series. The season was titled Sarabhai vs Sarabhai: Take 2. The takes leap of seven years with the introduction of some new characters.

No.	Title	Original release date
1	"Monisha Ki Mannat – 1"	15 May 2017
The Sarabhais are stuck in a bus on the edge of a cliff. In the flashback, on Sonya's tarot card reading, Monisha explains that she has vowed to pay visit to the shrine of Matkadharbaba for the marriage of Rosesh. Before boarding the bus, Rosesh meets his love-at-first-sight Jasmine.
2	"Monisha Ki Mannat – 2"	22 May 2017
Monisha gets Arnab out of the bus through window and he brings some villagers. They help them get out of the bus. Later Rosesh gets stuck on a bridge but Sahil saves him. Sarabhais visit the shrine of Matkadharbaba and fulfills the vow.
3	"Rosesh Gets Married"	29 May 2017
Rosesh decides to marry Jasmine without consent of Maya. Maya disapproves their marriage and tried to stop it with fake prophecy by Sonia. Jasmine announces pregnancy.
4	"Papa don't preach, says Sahil"	5 June 2017
Arnab's teacher complains that Arnab brings mobile in school. Sahil blames Indravadan from spoiling Arnab. Sahil and Indravadan starts to argue.
5	"Indu's antics"	12 June 2017
Sahil insults Indravadan for being reckless and unsuccessful. Everyone motivates Indravadan to open an antic shop. Arnab asks Sahil to apologize to Indravadan.
6	"Man of the hour, Kachcha Kela"	19 June 2017
No one purchase anything from Indu Antic shop. Dushyant who is later joined by Monisha and Jasmine, accuses Kachcha Kela for robbing something but is proved wrong. Sahil gets happy as the first day of the shop goes flop. Guest Star: Aatish Kapadia
7	"Jasmine, Maya locks horn"	26 June 2017
Maya asks everyone to write their true feelings on paper chits on the World Honesty Day. Everyone's printed chits are put in the Bowl.
8	"Maya vs Sahil"	3 July 2017
There are very bad comments for Maya written on the chits. Maya finds out it was Sahil as the chits were printed from his tablet. However, Maya finds out that it was Rosesh who had written about Maya. Guest Star: Aatish Kapadia
9	"Bahu Machhar Beta Khachhar"	10 July 2017
Rosesh and Jasmine do a drama serial. The director insults Rosesh and Jasmine feels bad and quit the serial with Rosesh. Maya and Rosesh shoot an advertisement with Prahlad but Prahlad doesn't like Rosesh's acting. Guest Star: Jamnadas Majethia and Vishal Gandhi
10	"Monisha–Sahil, Divorced?"	17 July 2017
Monisha and Maya goes to Arnab sports day and he gets misplaced. Monisha says that if Arnab will come home, she will leave Sahil forever. After Arnab gets home back, Monisha take Arnab with him and goes to her village, leaving Divorce papers for Sahil.
