= Pravin Joshi =

Indian stage director

- Born: 1 January 1934; India
- Died: 19 January 1979 (aged 45)
- Occupations: Actor; Director; Playwright
- Spouse(s): Tarla Joshi; Sarita Joshi
- Children: Purbi Joshi; Ketki Dave
- Relatives: Roy–Joshi–Irani-Desai family

Pravin Joshi (1 January 1934 – 19 January 1979) was an Indian stage actor and director. He was a leading figure of the commercial Gujarati theatre in the 1960s–70s.

== Biography ==
Pravin Joshi was one of the most dynamic figures of the contemporary Gujarati Stage. He participated in the one-act play competitions organised by the Bharatiya Vidya Bhavan in Bombay (now Mumbai) in the mid-1950s where he received attention. He crossed over naturally from the arena inter-collegiate competitions to the professional Gujarati Theatre. He joined the Indian National Theatre (INT) in 1956 was trained under Damu Jhaveri.

He was trained at the Royal Academy of Dramatic Art, London.

His about 25 plays produced under the INT introduced sophistication in the Gujarati theatre. He directed and acted in several successful adaptations including Mogarana Sap (Snake in the Jasmine, 1963, adapted from Frederick Knott's Dial M for Murder), Manju Manju (1965, adapted from Jean Kerr's Mary Mary), Chandarvo (Colourful Canopy, 1966, from Merry-go-round by Albert Maltz and George Sklar), Santu Rangili (Enchanting Santu, 1974, adapted from George Bernard Shaw's Pygmalion by Madhu Rye), Mosam Chhalake (Pleasant Times, 1978, adapted from Bernard Slade's Same Time, Next Year), Sharat (A Bet, adapted from Friedrich Dürrenmatt's The Visit) and Khelando (Player, adapted from Anthony Shaffer's Sleuth). His other successful plays as a director include Moti Verana Chokma and Kumarni Agashi (Kumar's Terrace, by Madhu Rye).

In most of the plays he acted alongside Sarita Joshi, whom he later married. Their daughters, Ketki Dave and Purbi Joshi, are also actors.

Pravin Joshi died in an accident on 19 January 1979.

== Plays ==
Year	Play	Role	Playwright
1958	Kadam Milake Chalo		Prabodh Joshi
1961	Kaumar Asambhavam		Hakumat Desai
1961	Meen Pyasi	Kakaji	Pravin Joshi
1962	Mogarana Saap	Amar	Pravin Joshi
1963	Shyam Gulab		
1964	Koino Ladkvayo		Pravin Joshi
1965	Manju Manju		
1966	Manas Name Karagar		Jayant Parekh
1966	Chandarvo		
1967	Ane Indrajit	Lekhak	
1967	Saptapadi		Tarak Mehta
1968	Dhummas		Madhukar Zaveri
1968	AganKhel		
1969	Moti Verana Chokma		Ramji Vaniya
1970	Sagpanna Phul		Anil Mehta
1971	Sapnana Vavetar	Arun	Anil Mehta
1972	Chor Bajar		Anil Mehta
1972	Kumarni Agashi	Bipin Khatri	Madhu Rye
1973	Santu Rangili	Prof. Himadrivadan Vaishnav	Madhu Rye
1974	Salgya Surajmukhi		
1975	Sharat	Mayor	Madhu Rye
1976	Khelando	Prof. Hirak Ganatra	Madhu Rye
1976	Vaishakhi Koyal	Mr. Nanavati	Sitanshu Yashahchandra
1976	Saybo Gulabno Chod		Anil Mehta
1977	Thank You Mr.Glad		Anil Mehta
1978	Mausam Chhalake		Tarak Mehta

== Filmography ==
- Kumkum Pagla (1972)
- Aakrant (1973)
