= Hasratein =

- Also known as: Desires
- Directed by: Ajai Sinha
- Starring: See below
- Music by: Sudhir Moghe
- Opening theme: Hasratein hi hasratein hai aur kya hai
- Country of origin: India
- Original language: Hindi
- No. of seasons: 4
- No. of episodes: 208

Production
- Producers: Sangeeta Sinha, Raakesh Shah
- Running time: 23 minutes (approx.)

Original release
- Network: Zee TV

Hasratein (transl. Desires) is an Indian Hindi-language soap opera that originally aired on Zee TV in the mid-1990s. Directed by Ajai Sinha and produced by Sangeeta Sinha and Raakesh Shah, the show was based on the Marathi novel Adhantari by Jaywant Dalvi. The series is currently available for streaming on ZEE5.

The drama became notable for its bold depiction of extra-marital relationships and women’s agency, centering on the character of Savi who leaves her husband to live with another married man while both their spouses are aware of the situation. Its success made it one of the most talked-about Indian television dramas of the decade, sparking discussions on marital discord and the evolving roles of women in Indian society.

== Plot ==
Hasratein focuses on the complexities of extra-marital relationships. One of the main storylines follows Savi, a woman who leaves her husband and maintains a relationship with another married man, with both their spouses being aware of the situation. Her actions are partly shaped by her childhood, when her mother left her father for another man. The show emphasizes the societal strain placed on marriages in Indian culture, especially the roles expected of women and the dissatisfaction sometimes felt by men.

== Production ==
Hasratein was one of the most popular television shows of the mid and late 1990s. According to critic Shubhra Gupta, the serial’s popularity "had made it a catalyst for the discussion of issues of marital discord, in spite of the embarrassment the serial generated for many people."

Seema Kapoor played the character of Savi for the first 125 episodes. She was later replaced by Shefali Chhaya (now Shefali Shah), whose performance earned her the Zee Woman of the Year award in 1997.

== Cast ==
- Seema Kapoor as Savi (episodes 45–126)
- Shefali Shah (credited as Shefali Chhaya) as Savi (episodes 126–209)
- Harsh Chhaya as Krishnakant Trivedi (KT)
- Mrinal Kulkarni as Asmita Krishnakant Trivedi
- Ajit Vachhani as Govind Sahai
- Rita Bhaduri as Madhvi Sahai
- Dharmesh Vyas as Professor Shyam Verma
- Himani Shivpuri as Sulakshana (Savi’s mother)
- Neha Pendse as Urja, daughter of Savi and KT
- Cezanne Khan as Yogesh, son of KT and Asmita
- Ketki Dave as Mansi
