= List of Marathi films of 2019 =

This is a list of Marathi (Indian Marathi-language) films that were released in 2019.

== January to March ==
Opening		Title	Director	Cast	Ref.
J A N	11	Love You Zindagi	Manoj Sawant	Sachin Pilgaonkar, Prarthana Behere, Kavita Lad	
J A N	25	Thackeray	Abhijit Panse	Nawazuddin Siddiqui, Amrita Rao, Sanjay Narvekar	
J A N	26	Veergati	Raju Desai, Vishal Desai	Aditi Bhaskar, Nikhil Chavan, Anwar Fatehan	
F E B	1	Sarva Line Vyasta Ahet	Pradip Mestry	Siddharth Jadhav, Mahesh Manjrekar, Sanskruti Balgude	
F E B	1	Dhappa	Nipun Dharmadhikari	Deepali Borkar, Sharav Wadhawekar, Sharavi Kulkarni, Shrihari Abhyankar, Akash Kamble	
F E B	1	Youth Tube	Pramod Prabhulkar	Shivani Baokar, Purneima Dey, Sharvari Gaikwad, Mrunmayee Kulkarni.	
F E B	7	Luckee	Sanjay Jadhav	Abhay Mahajan, Deepti Sati	
F E B	8	Aasud	Nilesh Jalamkar	Amitriyan Patil, Vikram Gokhale, Pradeep Welankar, Anant Jog	
F E B	15	Anandi Gopal	Sameer Vidwans	Bhagyashree Milind, Lalit Prabhakar, Kshitee Jog, Yogesh Soman	
F E B	22	Unmatta			
M A R	1	Dokyala Shot	Shivkumar Parthasarathy	Suvrat Joshi, Prajakta Mali, Rohit Haldikar, Omkar Govardhan, Ganesh Pandit	
M A R	1	Ashi Hi Aashiqui	Sachin Pilgaonkar	Abhinay Berde, Hemal Ingle, Sunil Barve, Karan Bhanushali	
M A R	29	Aamhi Befikar	Kavishwar Marathe	Suyog Gorhe, Mitali Mayekar, Rahul Patil, Swapnil Kale, Akshay Hadke	

== April to June ==
Opening		Title	Director	Cast	Ref.
A P R	26	Kaagar	Makarand Mane	Rinku Rajguru, Shubhankar Tawde, Shashank Shende, Suhas Palshikar	
M A Y	03	Baalaa	Sachindra Sharma	Ashish Gokhale, Vikram Gokhale, Mihiresh Joshi	
M A Y	10	66 Sadashiv	Yogesh Deshpande	Mohan Joshi, Vandana Gupte, Apurva Modak, Pravin Tarde, Yogesh D	
M A Y	24	Rampaat	Ravi Jadhav	Abhinay Berde, Kashmira Pardeshi, Kushal Badrike, Priya Arun	
M A Y	28	Takatak	Milind Arun Kumar Khavde	Pranali Bhalerao, Ritika Shrotri, Prathamesh Parab	
J U N	10	Adham	Abhishek Kelkar	Santosh Juvekar, Gauri Nalawade, Kishor Kadam	
J U N	21	Miss U Mister	Sameer Joshi	Mrunmayee Deshpande, Siddharth Chandekar, Savita Prabhune	

== July to September ==
Opening		Title	Director	Cast	Ref.
J U L	12	WhatsApp Love	Hemantkumar Mahale	Raqesh Bapat, Annuup Choudhari, Sareh Far, Amol More.	
J U L	19	Smile Please	Vikram Phadnis	Mukta Barve, Lalit Prabhakar	
J U L	26	Girlfriend	Upendra Sidhaye	Amey Wagh, Sai Tamhankar	
A U G	1	Once More	Naresh Bidkar	Rohini Hattangadi, Bharat Ganeshpure	
A U G	9	Ye Re Ye Re Paisa 2	Hemant Dhome	Sanjay Narvekar, Aniket Vishwasrao	

== October to December ==
Opening		Title	Director	Cast	Studio (Production house)	Ref.
O C T	11	Appa Ani Bappa	Garima Dhir, Jalaj Dhir	Subodh Bhave, Sanjay Choudhary, Tushar Dalvi		
O C T	18	Rom Com	Gorakh Jogdande	Vijay Gite, Madhura Vaidya		
O C T	24	Hirkani	Prasad Oak	Chinmay Mandlekar, Sonalee Kulkarni		
O C T	25	Triple Seat	Sanket Pawse	Ankush Chaudhari, Shivani Surve, Pallavi Patil		
N O V	15	Fatteshikast	Digpal Lanjekar	Chinmay Mandlekar, Mrinal Kulkarni, Sameer Dharmadhikari		
N O V	22	Kulkarni Chaukatla Deshpande	Gajendra Ahire	Sai Tamhankar, Rajesh Shringarpure, Nikhil Ratnaparkhi		
N O V	29	Girlz	Vishal Devrukhkar	Ankita Lande, Devika Daftardar, Ketaki Narayan, Parth Bhalerao		
D E C	6	Vicky Velingkar	Saurabh Verma	Sonalee Kulkarni, Spruha Joshi		
D E C	27	Aatpadi Nights	Nitin Supekar	Subodh Bhave, Pranav Raorane, Sayali Sanjeev		
