= Savita Prabhune =

Indian actress

- Prabhune in 2012
- Born: 18 April 1960 (age 66); Wai, Maharashtra, India
- Education: Bachelor of Arts
- Alma mater: National School of Drama
- Occupation: Actress
- Years active: 1984 - Present
- Spouse: Rajesh Singh (m. 1984; div. 2000)
- Children: 1

Savita Prabhune (born 18 April 1960) is an Indian actress who primarily worked in Marathi and Hindi television, theatre and cinema. With a career spanning nearly four decades, she is celebrated for her nuanced portrayals of strong, self-respecting women in Marathi films and for her impactful supporting roles on Hindi television. She has received several accolades, including two Maharashtra State Film Award, an Indian Telly Award, and a Natya Darpan Award.

An alumna of the NSD, she began her career in experimental and commercial Marathi theatre before transitioning to films in the mid-1980s. She earned early recognition for her performances in Lek Chalali Sasarla (1984), Gadbad Ghotala (1986), Dhakti Suun (1986) and Mamla Porincha (1988), eventually becoming a prominent leading actress in Marathi cinema with critically and commercially successful films like Kalat Nakalat, for which she received the Maharashtra State Best Actress Award in 1989.

By the mid-1990s, Prabhune had established herself on Indian television, with early appearances in serials such as Phoolwanti and Itihaas. Her transition to mother and character roles was met with critical acclaim, particularly for her performances in Koshish – Ek Aashaa, Kkusum and Kkavyanjali. She attained widespread popularity with her portrayal of Sulochana Karanjkar in the long-running Zee TV series Pavitra Rishta (2009–2014), a role that earned her multiple awards. Alongside her television success, she continued working in theatre and films, with notable performances in Char Divas Premache, Mumbai-Pune-Mumbai 2, and Miss U Mister, the latter earning her a Filmfare Marathi nomination.

Some of her other noteworthy works include the television shows Khulta Kali Khulena, Tujhse Hai Raabta, Swabhiman – Shodh Astitvacha and Anupamaa.

== Early life ==
Savita Prabhune was born on 18 April 1960, in Wai, Maharashtra, India, into a Maharashtrian family with deep-rooted cultural values. Her father was a renowned doctor and she has a younger brother who is also a doctor and settled in Pune. From an early age, Savita showed a keen interest in acting. After completing her primary education in Bachelor of Arts, her father encouraged her to pursue formal training in the performing arts. She went on to join the prestigious National School of Drama (NSD) in New Delhi, where she was batchmates with notable actors like Shrivallabh Vyas, Satyabrata Rout and Sushmita Mukherjee.

== Career ==
=== Early years and film debut (1983–1985) ===
After earning her diploma from the National School of Drama (NSD) in 1983, Prabhune began her professional acting journey with Maharani Padmini, an experimental play staged by the acclaimed theatre group Natyasampada. Her transition into commercial theatre came with Nishpap, helmed by veteran actor-director Sadashiv Amrapurkar. The production garnered appreciation, won a Maharashtra State Best Actress Award, and helped establish her early presence on the Marathi stage.

In 1984, even as she remained active in theatre, she ventured into Hindi cinema with minor appearances. She featured in NFDC’s Party, directed by Govind Nihalani, where she played a fan of Shafi Inamdar’s character, and also in Rajshri Productions’ Abodh, essaying the role of Madhuri Dixit’s sister-in-law. That same year marked her debut in Marathi films with supporting roles. Her first appearance came in N. S. Vaidya’s superhit Lek Chalali Sasarla, a dowry-themed marital drama produced by Annasaheb Deulgaonkar, in which she played a principled sister-in-law confronting domestic abuse. She shared the screen with Laxmikant Berde, Alka Kubal, Shashikala, and Mahesh Kothare. She next featured as the second lead in Aali Laher Kela Kahar, a romantic drama where she played a contemporary urban woman who captures the affection of Vicky, portrayed by Kuldeep Pawar.

=== Leading roles in Marathi cinema and critical acclaim (1986–1993) ===
Prabhune breakthrough as a leading actress arrived with Gadbad Ghotala, a comedy-drama opposite Ashok Saraf, where she portrayed Bhimrao’s daughter—an earnest young woman balancing love and her father’s political aspirations. The disco number “Tuje Maje Nathe Raja,” picturized on the film’s leads, became a cult favourite in the 1980s. This success was followed by Khara Varasdar, directed by Bipin Varti, in which she delivered a poignant performance as a devoted wife committed to her mentally challenged husband’s wellbeing. That same year saw her reunite with N. S. Vaidya in Dhakti Suun, playing the titular daughter-in-law, a resilient and self-respecting woman who turns adversity into achievement, ultimately becoming an entrepreneur. Each of these films fared well commercially, solidifying her image as a rising lead actress in Marathi cinema.

Continuing her momentum, she appeared in several films the following year. These included Chhakke Panje, a romantic comedy where she acted alongside Dilip Prabhavalkar; Vahinisaheb, a family drama where she played the title character; and Khara Kadhi Bolu Naye, a comedy directed by Ravi Namade, where she starred opposite Laxmikant Berde. Her films in 1988 featured Mamla Porincha, a Marathi adaptation of the Hollywood classic 9 to 5, where she played one of three headstrong working women who confront a lecherous boss. The film, co-starring Ashok Saraf, Laxmikant Berde, and Nivedita Joshi, turned into a major box office hit and was later remade in Hindi as Hello Darling (2010). That year, she also appeared in Gauracha Navra directed by Usha Chavan, in the role of a domestic worker.

In 1989, her only release was the comedy Pheka Pheki, directed by Bipin Varti, a Marathi remake of Aaj Ki Taaza Khabar (1973), the film featured her as a shrewd and suspicious wife opposite Ashok Saraf and its blend of sharp humour and chaos was both critically and commercially acclaimed. She as an actress received a major boost opposite Vikram Gokhale in Asmita Chitra’s acclaimed social drama Kalat Nakalat. She portrayed a strong-willed wife whose world is shaken after discovering that her husband had a one-night stand with his widowed secretary. The film was both a critical and commercial success, with particular praise for Prabhune’s powerful performance. A critic from WordPress observed, "The film derives the much-loved ‘creative tension’, thanks to the headstrong wife played by Savita Prabhune. She represents someone who is truly committed to the family and has not had any marital problems earlier." Kalat Nakalat bagged the National Film Award for Best Marathi Feature Film and secured seven Maharashtra State Film Awards, including Best Actress for Prabhune.

Following this acclaim, she next appeared in Tuzhi Mazhi Jamli Jodi, an ensemble family drama where she played a disillusioned wife coping with an alcoholic and philandering husband. The film was a major box office success.

Her television debut came in 1992 with Phoolwanti, a musical drama based on a story by noted writer Narayan Sitaram Phadke. Produced by Usha Mangeshkar and aired on Doordarshan, the series starred Arun Govil, Archana Joglekar, and Prabhune, who played Lakshmi, the dignified wife of Venkatadhwari Narasimha Shastri. The show gained significant popularity and became one of the most well-received television dramas of its time. She also had a brief yet impactful role in the Hindi film Current (1992), produced by NFDC.

The following year, she was seen in two significant Marathi films. In Shrabani Deodhar’s Lapandav, a National Award-winning comedy-drama, she played a wife suspicious of her husband’s fidelity, again opposite Vikram Gokhale and also featured in Paisa Paisa Paisa, directed by Kumar Sohoni, where she portrayed a materialistic woman. These films marked her final appearances as a leading lady.

=== Supporting and notable roles (1995–2013) ===
From 1995, she transitioned more regularly to television. She featured in episodic roles in Raaz....Ki Ek Baat... (1995), and subsequently in Sony TV’s comedy Yeh Shaadi Nahi Ho Sakti (1995–1997), followed by the period drama Itihaas (1996–1998), marking her first project with Ekta Kapoor for Balaji Telefilms. In 1998, she was cast in UTV’s Saaya, where she played the mother of Manasi Joshi Roy’s character in a story centred around two contrasting women. The next year saw her appear in Neena Gupta’s StarPlus drama Pal Chhin, and she also featured in an episode of Suraag – The Clue, a crime series.

Entering the new millennium, she starred in Kartavya, on Zee TV, a socio-moral drama examining dilemmas tied to duty and destiny, where she shared screen space with Anup Soni, Ali Asgar, Anant Jog, Nivedita Bhattacharya and Swati Chitnis. Another significant project was Koshish – Ek Aashaa, where her role further cemented her popularity in Hindi television. This led to prominent mother roles in Balaji's Kkusum (2001–2005), Kkavyanjali (2005–2006), and Neela Tele Films' Saarrthi (2005–2008), where she replaced Neena Kulkarni. Simultaneously, she was seen in the Asmita Chitra’s Marathi daily soap Oon Paus, aired on Zee Marathi. Her film work during this phase included supporting roles in Khalid Mohamed’s Fiza (2000) as a policewoman, Meghna Gulzar’s Filhaal... as Sushmita Sen’s mother, and Satish Kaushik’s Tere Naam as Salman Khan’s supportive sister-in-law. During this time, she also performed extensively in Char Divas Premache, a celebrated Marathi play written by Ratnakar Matkari and directed by Waman Kendre, alongside Prashant Damle, Arun Nalawade, and Kavita Lad. The play explores how marriage, over time, can lead to emotional stagnation, with Prabhune portraying multiple nuanced characters throughout its run. Her performance earned her the Natya Darpan Award.

In the mid-2000s, she appeared in the critical acclaimed Tamil-Telugu bilingual film 7G Rainbow Colony, playing a mother who ultimately empathizes with her daughter’s lover. She also featured in the Bhojpuri political drama film Banke Biharee M.L.A., alongside Ravi Kishan and Rambha. Her most iconic television role came as Sulochana Karanjkar in Balaji’s popular daily soap Pavitra Rishta, which aired on Zee TV from 2009 to 2014. She played the affectionate and principled mother of the female protagonist, portrayed by Ankita Lokhande. At the time, it became the third longest-running Indian television series on Zee TV, completing a successful five-year run. Prabhune’s performance earned her several awards and nominations in the Best Supporting Actress category, including the Indian Telly Award and two Boroplus Gold Awards.

=== Television expansion (2014–present) ===
In 2013, she stepped into Zee Marathi’s Mala Sasu Havi, replacing Asawari Joshi, and went on to lead the channel’s popular series Jawai Vikat Ghene Aahe the following year. That same year, she appeared briefly in Killa a critically acclaimed Marathi film directed by Avinash Arun. In 2015, she was seen as Mukta Barve’s mother in Satish Rajwade’s Mumbai-Pune-Mumbai 2, a film that was both a commercial and critical success, with her performance earning praise.

Balancing her work across mediums, Prabhune continued to appear in Marathi and Hindi serials. Notable among these were Khulta Kali Khulena (2016–2017) on Zee Marathi, Swabhiman – Shodh Astitvacha (2021–2023) on Star Pravah, and Zee TV’s Tujhse Hai Raabta (2018–2021), where she played the grandmother. In 2021, she took over the role of Anupamaa’s mother in StarPlus’s hit show Anupamaa, replacing Madhavi Gogate and remained part of the cast till 2024. On the big screen, she featured in the romantic drama TTMM – Tujha Tu Majha Mi (2017), the psychological horror Savita Damodar Paranjpe (2018), and the romantic film Miss U Mister (2018), portraying the mothers of characters played by Lalit Prabhakar, Trupti Toradmal, and Siddharth Chandekar, respectively. For the lattermost, she received a nomination for Best Supporting Actress at the Filmfare Awards Marathi. Contrasting these nurturing roles, she took on a more authoritative character as an advocate in the action drama Bandishala.

== Personal life ==
Prabhune married her NSD batchmate Rajesh Kumar Singh in 1984, but the couple later divorced in 2000. They have a daughter, Satwika Singh, who was formerly a model and is now professionally associated with Warner Bros. Pictures.

In 2011, she was part of the jury panel for the BIG Marathi Awards.

== Filmography ==
=== Films ===
Year	Title	Role	Language	Notes
1984	Party	Ravi's fan	Hindi	Special appearance
1984	Abodh	Sudhakar's wife	Hindi	Debut film
1984	Lek Chalali Sasarla	Jyoti Inamdar	Marathi	
1984	Aali Lahar Kela Kahar	Chaitali Deosarkar	Marathi	Lead Debut
1986	Gadbad Ghotala	Manisha	Marathi	
1986	Khara Varasdar	Durga	Marathi	
1986	Dhakti Suun	Ujjwala	Marathi	
1987	Chhake Panje	Usha	Marathi	
1987	Vahinisaheb	Vahinisaheb	Marathi	
1987	Khara Kadhi Bolu Naye	Priya Khote	Marathi	
1988	Gauracha Navra	Champa / Vidya	Marathi	
1988	Mamla Porincha	Sujata Solapure	Marathi	
1989	Pheka Pheki	Vijaya Rajan Pradhan	Marathi	
1990	Kalat Nakalat	Uma Desai	Marathi	
1990	Kuldeepak	Kiran Shyam Inamdar	Marathi	
1990	Tuzhi Mazhi Jamli Jodi	Asha	Marathi	
1990	Dhadaka	Kamal Paranjape	Marathi	
1992	Current	Radha	Hindi	
1992	Mai Lek		Marathi	
1993	Lapandav	Ulka Mahashabdey	Marathi	
1993	Paisa Paisa Paisa	Sheela Kelkar	Marathi	
1998	Do Numbri	Urmila Devi	Hindi	
2000	Fiza	Policewoman	Hindi	Special appearance
2002	Filhaal	Savita	Hindi	Special appearance
2003	Tere Naam	Gayatri Mohan	Hindi	
2004	7/G Rainbow Colony	Anita's mother	Tamil / Telugu	
2007	Banke Biharee M.L.A.		Bhojpuri	
2014	Killa	Mrs. Navte	Marathi	
2014	Bazar E Husn	Gangajali	Hindi	
2014	Aamhi Bolato Marathi	Savita	Marathi	
2015	Mumbai-Pune-Mumbai 2	Sunanda Deshpande	Marathi	
2015	Story of a Lonely Goldfish	Grandma	Hindi	Short film
2015	Highway	Savita	Marathi	Special appearance
2016	Duniya Geli Tel Lavat	Raja's mother	Marathi	
2017	TTMM – Tujha Tu Majha Mi	Jay's mother	Marathi	
2018	Youngraad	Suryavanshi Bai	Marathi	
2018	Savita Damodar Paranjpe	Kusum's mother	Marathi	
2018	Mumbai Pune Mumbai 3	Sunanda Deshpande	Marathi	
2019	Bandishala	Advocate Prarthana Sadavarte	Marathi	
2019	Miss U Mister	Vedha	Marathi	
2020	Kusum Manohar Lele	Nirmala Joshi	Marathi	Television film
2025	Vadapav	Subhadra	Marathi	

=== Television ===
Year	Show	Role	Channel	Language	Notes
1992	Phoolwanti	Lakshmi	DD National	Hindi	
1995	Raaz....Ki Ek Baat...	Episodic roles	DD National	Hindi	
1995–1997	Yeh Shaadi Nahin Ho Sakti	Golchi	SET	Hindi	
1996–1998	Itihaas	Kaushalya	DD National	Hindi	
1998–2000	Saaya	Sudha's mother	SET	Hindi	
1999	Pal Chhin	Damyanti Singh	StarPlus	Hindi	
1999	Suraag – The Clue	Shrikant's mother	DD National	Hindi	
2001	Bandini		DD Sahyadri	Marathi	
2000–2001	Kartavya	Sita	Zee TV	Hindi	
2000–2002	Koshish – Ek Aashaa	Rekha	Zee TV	Hindi	
2001	Sanskruti	Rukmani	StarPlus	Hindi	
2001–2005	Kkusum	Sumitra Deshmukh	SET	Hindi	
2003–2004	Jeet	Maa	StarPlus	Hindi	
2005	Oon Paus	Shalini Padmakar Sardesai	Zee Marathi	Marathi	
2005–2006	Kkavyanjali	Mrs. Salve	StarPlus	Hindi	
2005–2008	Saarrthi	Kumud Goenka	StarPlus	Hindi	
2007 2008	Main Aisi Kyunn Hoon	Pushpa	Sahara One	Hindi	
2007–2009	Sangam	Aai	StarPlus	Hindi	
2009–2014	Pavitra Rishta	Sulochana Karanjkar	Zee TV	Hindi	
2013	Mala Sasu Havi	Gayatri Ratnaparkhi	Zee Marathi	Marathi	
2014–2015	Jawai Vikat Ghene Aahe	Veena Pradhan	Zee Marathi	Marathi	
2015	Stories by Rabindranath Tagore	Apporba's Mother	Epic TV	Hindi	
2016–2017	Khulta Kali Khulena	Alaka Vijay Dalvi	Zee Marathi	Marathi	
2017	Ayushman Bhava	Kaushalya Dubey	STAR Bharat	Hindi	
2018	Tujhse Hai Raabta	Ahilya Deshmukh	Zee TV	Hindi	
2019	Saath De Tu Mala	Aai	Star Pravah	Marathi	
2021–2023	Swabhiman – Shodh Astitvacha	Suparna Suryavanshi	Star Pravah	Marathi	
2021–2023	Anupamaa	Kanta Joshi	StarPlus	Hindi	
2024–present	Gharo Ghari Matichya Chuli	Sumitra	Star Pravah	Marathi	

=== Play ===
- Maharani Padmini (1983)
- Nishpap (1985)
- Tu Fakt Ho Mhan
- Tichi Kathach Vegali
- Paul Na Vajavta
- Chitkar
- Shadyantra (1990)
- Char Divas Premache (1996)

== Awards ==
Year	Award	Category	For	Result
1986	Maharashtra State Film Awards	Best Actress in a Commercial Play	Nishpap	Won
1989	Maharashtra State Film Awards	Best Actress	Kalat Nakalat	Won
1997	Natya Darpan Awards	Best Actress (Play)	Char Divas Premache	Won
2009	Indian Telly Awards	Best Actress in a Supporting Role	Pavitra Rishta	Won
2010	Boroplus Gold Awards	Best Actress in Supporting Role (Critics)	Pavitra Rishta	Won
2011	Zee Rishtey Awards	Favourite Mata-Pita (along with Kishor Mahabole)	Pavitra Rishta	Won
2011	Boroplus Gold Awards	Best Actress in Supporting Role (Critics)	Pavitra Rishta	Won
2020	Filmfare Awards Marathi	Best Supporting Actress – Marathi	Miss U Mister	Nominated
