= Naanga Romba Busy =

2020 Indian Tamil-language comedy film directed by Badri

- Official poster
- Based on: Mayabazar 2016
- Story by: Radhakrishna Reddy
- Directed by: Badri
- Starring: Prasanna; Shaam; Ashwin Kakumanu; Yogi Babu; Shruti Marathe; Rittika Sen; VTV Ganesh
- Music by: C. Sathya
- Country of origin: India
- Original language: Tamil

Production
- Producers: Sundar C Kalanithi Maran
- Cinematography: E. Krishnasamy
- Running time: 150 minutes
- Production companies: Avni Movies; Sun Entertainment

Original release
- Network: Sun TV
- Release: 14 November 2020

Naanga Romba Busy (transl. We are very busy) is a 2020 Indian Tamil-language crime comedy film directed by Badri. It is a remake of the Kannada film Mayabazar 2016 (2020) and stars Prasanna, Shaam, Ashwin Kakumanu, Yogi Babu, Shruti Marathe, Rittika Sen, and VTV Ganesh. The film premiered as a Diwali special on Sun TV on 14 November 2020.

== Plot ==
Kuberan, a small-time crook, needs money to escape from police. Kumaravel is an honest police officer whose wife Sangeetha suffers from thyroid cancer, but he has no money to save her. Karthik is a poor carpenter who falls in love with rich girl Meera and also needs money to marry her.

During the demonetisation of banknotes in India in 2016, Kumaravel who works in IB hatches a plan, using Kuberan, to conduct fake IT raids on the black money holders, and the plan succeeds. Kumaravel asks Kuberan to stop the raids, but the situation becomes critical when Sangeetha needs more treatment to cure her cancer. Kumaravel agrees to one last raid, and Kuberan raids a house, gets crores in old currency and finds Karthik in the house owner's bedroom, but on Karthik's request, Kuberan agrees not to tell anyone about Karthik. Kuberan argues with Kumaravel about the raid, and Karthik discovers that the raid was fake and asks for a share in the money.

The money actually belongs to corrupt police officer ACP Ravichandran. He learns that the raid was fake and begins to investigate. Kumaravel tells that the CBI raids everywhere were to exchange old notes to new, and everyone is in urgent need of money, so he plans to steal in the house of notorious corporate Oorandai Govindan's, but the plan fails. Karthik leaves the group for the sake of his future child. Kumaravel goes back to an honest living and surrenders the money to Ravichandran. Kuberan raids Govindan's house with a new team and gets 15 crore new currency notes while dealing with Govindan. Ravichandran arrests Kuberan and takes the whole black money himself. However, Kuberan captures the whole thing in a secret camera. Finally, Ravichandran releases Kuberan and also gives a share in the money. Also, Sangeetha gets aid from a foundation for treatment. Karthik also marries Meera, who also gets a share in the money which Kuberan got. Kumaravel serves the duty with honesty, Karthik, his wife and Kuberan goes to Bangkok and settle there.

== Cast ==
- Prasanna as Kumaravel
- Shaam as Ravichandran
- Ashwin Kakumanu as Karthik
- Yogi Babu as Kuberan
- Shruti Marathe as Sangeetha
- Rittika Sen as Meera
- VTV Ganesh as Urundai Govindhan
- Powerstar Srinivasan as "Burma Bazaar" Poweru
- Singampuli as Constable Naidu
- Rajendran as a corrupt businessman
- Vichu Vishwanath as Kuberan's uncle
- R. N. R. Manohar as Meera's father
- Master Shakti as Vijay, Kumaravel's son
- Swaminathan as Swaminathan
- Manohar as Manohar
- M. J. Shriram as Karthik's father
- Thangadhurai as Thangadhurai
- Diwakar as Diwakar
- Vinodhini Vaidyanathan as Dr. Shantha
- Meena Vemuri as Mangalam
- Munnar Ramesh as Constable Moorthy
- Lollu Sabha Seshu as "Dubsmash" Rajagopal
- Muruganantham as Alex Pandian
- Aathma Patrick as Thief
- Samuthirakani as Himself (cameo appearance)

== Production ==
In early November 2020, the media reported that Sundar C had bought the remake rights of the Kannada film Mayabazar 2016 (2020). The film was launched on 14 September 2020 and is based on the 2016 Indian banknote demonetisation. He produced the film under his banner Avni Movies. The film is directed by Badri who previously worked with Sundar C as a dialogue writer for Kalakalappu (2012) and Action (2019). Prasanna and Shaam were cast as police officers while Ashwin Kakumanu and Yogi Babu were signed to portray a youngster and thief, respectively. Raiza Wilson was reported by the media as being a part of the film; however, this later proved to be false. Shruti Marathe, who starred in Guru Sishyan (2010), was cast as the female lead opposite Prasanna and this film marks her return to Tamil cinema. Rittika Sen, who was last seen in Dagaalty (2020), was cast as the female lead opposite Kakumanu. The film was shot in Chennai in twenty-six days during the COVID-19 pandemic. The title was later revealed to be Naanga Romba Busy. Prasanna later revealed that the inspiration for the title came after he said Naa Romba Busy (transl. I am very busy) on his birthday.

== Soundtrack ==
The songs are composed by C. Sathya.

- Theera Karai – Diwakar
- Adalu Amta Seenu – Gana Sallu, Diwakar, Ranina Reddy
- Raathiri – Chinmayi, Sathyaprakash

== Release and reception ==
The film was telecasted as direct television premiere via Sun TV on 14 November 2020 on Diwali festival. A critic from The Times of India said that "This demonetisation comedy often lacks spunk". A critic from Cinema Express wrote that "This remake manages to not just do justice to the original but also efficiently cater to the local audience".
