= Char Divas Premache =

Play written by Ratnakar Matkari

- Original language: Marathi
- Written by: Ratnakar Matkari

Premiere
- Place: India
- Directed by: Waman Kendre

Char Divas Premache is a Marathi play directed by Waman Kendre and written by Ratnakar Matkari. The star cast includes Prashant Damle, Kavita Lad, Arun Nalavade, Savita Prabhune.

The play explores the true meaning of love.

== Synopsis ==
Most of the people believe that love lasts only for four days and rest is a matter of bearing each other.

This play portrays the real meaning of love with a series of relationships which began as a childhood romance. It also goes to an extent to prove that jealousy and possessiveness also goes a long way in earning love of another person.

There are 2 main reasons for the fallout of relationship and shows that true love lasts longer if you want it to.

== Cast ==
- Prashant Damle
- Kavita Lad
- Arun Nalavade
- Savita Prabhune

== Crew ==
- Director - Waman Kendre
- Director - Ratnakar Matkari
