= Jawai Vikat Ghene Aahe =

Marathi-language television series

- Genre: Drama
- Starring: See below
- Country of origin: India
- Original language: Marathi
- No. of episodes: 283

Production
- Producers: Sangeeta Sarang; Rakesh Sarang
- Camera setup: Multi-camera
- Running time: 22 minutes

Original release
- Network: Zee Marathi
- Release: 3 March 2014 – 23 January 2015

Jawai Vikat Ghene Aahe (transl. Son-in-law is to buy) is an Indian Marathi language television series which aired on Zee Marathi. The series premiered from 3 March 2014 by replacing Radha Hi Bawari.

== Cast ==
- Tanvi Palav as Pranjal
- Niranjan Kulkarni as Raya
- Savita Prabhune as Veena Pradhan
- Ashalata Wabgaonkar
- Umesh Damle
- Sneha Raikar
- Milind Phatak
- Sachin Deshpande
- Kanchan Gupte
- Madhavi Nimkar
- Nupur Daithankar
