= Bhago Mohan Pyare =

Marathi-language TV series

- Genre: Comedy; Fantasy
- Directed by: Kedar Vaidya
- Starring: See below
- Country of origin: India
- Original language: Marathi
- No. of episodes: 92

Production
- Producers: Sujay Hande; Onkar Kate; Subodh Khanolkar
- Production locations: Mumbai, Maharashtra, India
- Camera setup: Multi-camera
- Running time: 22 minutes
- Production company: Ocean Film Company

Original release
- Network: Zee Marathi
- Release: 7 August 2019 – 11 January 2020

Related
- Jaago Mohan Pyare

Bhago Mohan Pyare (transl. Run lovely Mohan) is an Indian Marathi language television series which was aired on Zee Marathi. It starred Atul Parchure, Dipti Ketkar and Sarita Mehendale-Joshi in lead roles.

== Plot ==
Mohan is a teacher who decides to propose to the woman of his dream, Ms. Godbole. Mohan and the other teachers take the students to a village for a picnic. An old man tells Mohan about the ghost in that village. Later, he sees a beautiful woman at a debilitated Wada. Later, he marries that beautiful woman after that he realises that her teeth like a vampire and feet turned backwards like ghosts.

== Cast ==
=== Main ===
- Atul Parchure as Mohan Ashtaputre
- Dipti Ketkar as Meera Godbole
- Sarita Mehendale-Joshi as Madhuvanti

=== Recurring ===
- Mayuresh Khole as Digambar
- Kshitij Zavare as Madan
- Gajesh Kamble as Gunaji
- Snehal Shidam as Kamini Lanke
- Sheetal Shukla as Vahini
- Vivek Joshi as Dada
- Shruti Marathe as magician

== Awards ==
Zee Marathi Utsav Natyancha Awards 2019
| Category | Recipients | Role | Ref. |
|---|---|---|---|
| Best Actor | Atul Parchure | Mohan | |
| Best Comedy Male | Atul Parchure | Mohan | |

== Reception ==
=== Special episode (2.30 hours) ===
- 24 November 2019
- 22 December 2019

=== Ratings ===
| Week | Year | BARC Viewership | | Ref. |
| Week | Year | TRP | Rank | Ref. |
|---|---|---|---|---|
| Week 32 | 2019 | 3.6 | 4 | |
