= Kkusum =

Indian drama television series

- Genre: Soap opera
- Created by: Ekta Kapoor
- Written by: Dialogues: Sunjoy Shekhar
- Screenplay by: Anil Nagpal; Bharvi Shah; Kalpesh Modi
- Directed by: Anil V. Kumar; Santosh Bhatt; Jatin Ravasia; Jasbir Bhati
- Starring: See below
- Opening theme: "Main Kkusum" by Priya Bhattacharya
- Composer: Lalit Sen
- Country of origin: India
- Original language: Hindi
- No. of episodes: 1001

Production
- Producers: Shobha Kapoor; Ekta Kapoor
- Editors: Vikas Sharma; Sandeep Bhatt
- Camera setup: Multi-camera
- Running time: 22 minutes
- Production company: Balaji Telefilms

Original release
- Network: Sony Entertainment Television
- Release: 14 May 2001 – 30 November 2005

Related
- Tumchya Amchyatli Kkusum

Kkusum is an Indian television series produced by Ekta Kapoor's Balaji Telefilms which aired on Sony Entertainment Television from 14 May 2001 to 30 November 2005. It was directed by Jasbir Bhati. The show follows the journey of a young, hardworking and middle class girl, Kkusum and later, after a 20 year leap on her daughter Kkumud.

The show starred Nausheen Ali Sardar in the title role, and after a generation leap, it was played by Manasi Joshi Roy and Shilpa Saklani. Actor Anuj Saxena starred opposite her. The roles of Kkumud and Kali were essayed by Aashka Goradia and Rucha Gujarathi.

== Plot ==
This show is about a middle class girl, Kkusum Deshmukh, everyone in her family is dependent on her. She becomes engaged to Prakash Chitre, but Prakash leaves her because she isn't willing to leave her family with their responsibilities. Kkusum's parents are shattered. Then comes Nitin Kapoor, who asks Kkusum's hand in marriage for his son, Abhay Kapoor. Kkusum is shocked. But she meets him and puts forth a condition that she'll take her family's responsibilities after their marriage also. Abhay agrees with her. Kkusum is impressed with Abhay's progressive nature. They start meeting each other regularly and Kkusum gradually starts falling for Abhay. He always gifts her something. They happily marry each other.On their wedding night, he shows his weird sparks. He just tells her that he really likes her and pretends to go to sleep. She is confused. Weird incidents happen with the chandelier, snake, fire, etc. and Kkusum does not understand anything. Abhay also is having commitments with other girls. He is a playboy.

Kkusum finds out Abhay's truth but he always lies and saves himself. Kkusum also finds out that Abhay only married her because she is akhandsaubhagyavati (her husband will not die). Kkusum still stays because of her parents' respect. Abhay's friend Aryaman Oberoi befriends with Kkusum. Then later on, a girl named Esha Chopra comes along. Esha and Kkusum also become very good friends. But Esha starts liking Abhay, Abhay is also attracted to her, they get together, and have an extra-marital affair, Kkusum consummates her marriage when Abhay comes home intoxicated.Kkusum becomes pregnant but Abhay says that the child is of Aryaman. Kkusum slaps Esha and leaves the house when she finds out about Abhay and Esha. She is alone during her pregnancy stages. But Kkusum comes to the Kapoor Industries because her "in-laws" call her. Kkusum doesn't talk to Abhay. But due to some incidents, they become friends. Esha leaves because she thinks that Abhay is neglecting her and even Abhay realizes that he likes Kkusum so he proposes her again. Kkusum and Abhay patch up with each other. But Kkusum finds out that now Abhay cannot be a dad because of an accident that's why he called her back, because she's pregnant. Esha also comes back and befriends with Kkusum again. But Kkusum miscarries and holds Abhay responsible for the same. She again decides to leave the house but her mother-in-law, Sarla Nitin Kapoor insists her to stay in so Kkusum doesn't leave the house. Abhay is hurt by what Kkusum said so she apologizes to him. They are happy but then on Abhay's birthday she goes to pick him up from a farmhouse where she hears Abhay saying that he still has to act in front of Kkusum that he loves her. Kkusum's phone rings and Abhay and Esha are scared that someone heard them. Then they see Kkusum over there. Kkusum goes away from there to the Kapoor house. She goes there and waits for Abhay when he comes she slaps him twice and leaves saying that she'll never come back but her mother-in-law stops her. She tells Abhay to get out. Abhay leaves the house for sometime.

Meanwhile, there is a marriage proposal that comes to Tanya Kapoor who is Abhay's cousin sister. (They all love Kkusum and hate Abhay) Kkusum is supposed to do the set up of the pre-marriage but the groom Siddharth Kanwar falls for Kkusum instead of Tanya. Kkusum marries him despite not wanting to because of some unwanted reasons. Siddharth's paternal aunts, Pamela, Natasha "Tashu", maternal aunt, Raima, adoptive mother Reema and biological mother Devanshi are evil so they try to break them up but they fail because Siddharth loves Kkusum. Kkusum also starts to love Siddharth. Tashu announces that she will marry none other than Abhay. Tashu and Abhay marry. Later, It is revealed that Abhay married Tashu so that he could get closer to Kkusum (because Tashu is Sid's paternal aunt). Tashu is also interested in Abhay's wealth only . Now, Abhay wants to cause problems with Sid—Kkusum but fails. Sid's mother takes all of Sid's property so that they're beggars. Sid and Kkusum leave for chawl. Kkusum exposes Tashu and Abhay divorces her. She is kicked out of both her families. Later on, Abhay has brain tumor, and he changes for the good forever, and again due to a series of events, Kkusum and Abhay become friends. Sid starts to suspect them and questions her about her character. Kkusum is deeply hurt because of Sid. They get divorced. Sid goes back to his mom. But he finds out that Kkusum wasn't lying about the brain tumor case so he calls her while driving. He crashes into a car and dies. Kkusum is shattered.

A while later, everyone figures out that Abhay has brain tumor and then Sarla comes to Kkusum for her son's life. Sarla wants Kkusum to marry Abhay. After a lot of dragging, they marry and go to the states. Abhay is treated there and now he is completely cured of cancer. With the help of medical sciences, he can now become a father as well. One day, They meet Esha. They live with her. Abhay starts to fall for Kkusum (for real this time) and Esha also starts liking Kkusum. But Kkusum can't forget Siddharth. They go back, Esha comes back after sometime, Kkusum starts to fall for Abhay again, they both don't tell each other about their feelings, Esha comes to live in with them and she too falls for Abhay despite knowing that he is married. She tries to get close to Abhay but fails. Kkusum finally confesses to Abhay that she loves him and they consummate. Esha is shattered. Then everyone finds out that Abhay accidentally killed Siddharth when he was having brain tumor attack while driving. For a while, Kkusum is mad at Abhay but later realises that it wasn't Abhay's fault at all. Kkusum still forgives him. Then Kkusum and Abhay find out about Esha so they kick her out. Kkusum becomes pregnant but miscarries again, Esha tells the doctors to declare Kkusum barren, everyone wants an heir that Kkusum cannot give, so Kkusum gets a surrogate mother Mahi, she also falls for Abhay. She creates such situations that Kkusum suspects Mahi and Abhay so she leaves without interrogating. But on the train she finds out that she is pregnant, she goes to tell Abhay but mistakenly assumes that Mahi and Abhay are sharing a bed. She leaves for Ludhiana. But her train crashes and she is presumed dead. Mahi gives birth to her daughter with Abhay, Kali (via surrogacy) and Kkusum gives birth to a slightly younger girl, Kkumud.

== Cast ==
- Nausheen Ali Sardar / Manasi Joshi Roy as Kusum Deshmukh / Kusum Abhay Kapoor / Kusum Siddharth Kanwar: Vishwanath and Sumitra's elder daughter; Shashank, Jyoti, Yash and Sonali's sister; Abhay's widow; Siddharth's ex–wife; Kali and Kumud's mother; Trishul's stepmother (2001–2004) / (2004–2005)
- Shilpa Saklani as
  - Kusum Deshmukh / Kusum Abhay Kapoor (after plastic surgery) (2005)
  - Swati Abhinav Gautam: A contract killer; Abhinav's wife; Simi's mother (2005)
- Anuj Saxena / Rohit Roy / Anuj Saxena as Abhay Kapoor: Nitin and Sarala's son; Kusum's husband; Natasha and Mahi's ex–husband; Esha's ex–boyfriend; Trishul, Kali and Kumud's father (2001–2002) / (2002–2003) / (2003–2005)
- Sandeep Rajora as Siddharth "Sid" Kanwar: Raman and Devanshi's son; Reema's stepson; Aastha, Muskaan and Simran's half brother; Kusum's second husband; Tanya's ex–fiancè (2002–2003)
- Aashka Goradia as Kumud Kapoor / Kumud Garv Sachdev / Kumud Kshitij Oberoi / Kumud Karan Oberoi: Abhay and Kusum's daughter; Kali's sister; Natasha and Mahi's step daughter; Trishul's half sister; Garv and Kshitij's ex–wife; Karan's wife; Kusum's mother (2003–2005)
- Poonam Narula as Mahi Abhay Kapoor: Abhay's ex–wife; Trishul and Kumud's stepmother; Kali's surrogate mother (2003–2005)
- Nasir Khan as Karan Oberoi: Kumud's husband; Kusum's father (2005)
- Chetan Hansraj as Advocate Garv Sachdev: Vikram and Meenakshi's son; Kumud and Kali's ex–husband (2003–2005)
- Amit Sarin as Kshitij Oberoi: Aryaman and Sakshi's elder son; Nakul's elder brother; Kumud's ex–husband (2003–2005)
- Akashdeep Saigal as Trishul Kapoor: Abhay and Natasha's son; Kumud and Kali's elder half brother; Kusum and Mahi's stepson; Sohan's nephew and murderer (2005)
- Karanvir Bohra as Nakul Oberoi (2003–2005)
- Narayani Shastri as Natasha "Tashu" Kanwar / Natasha "Tashu" Abhay Kapoor: Raman and Pamela's younger sister; Rajeev, Vikram and Abhay's ex–wife; Trishul's mother; Kumud and Kali's stepmother (2002–2003; 2005)
- Mouli Ganguly as Vidhi Chopra / Vidhi Trishul Kapoor (2005)
- Aashish Kaul as Aryaman Oberoi: Neelam's son; Sakshi's husband; Kshitij and Nakul's father; Abhay's best friend; Kusum's sworn brother (2001–2005)
- Karishma Randhawa / Mayuri Kango / Shalini Kapoor / Mandeep Bhandar as Sakshi Aryaman Oberoi (2003) / (2003–2004) / (2005) / (2005)
- Rucha Gujarathi as Kali Kapoor / Kali Garv Sachdev / Kali Nakul Oberoi (2003–2005)
- Eijaz Khan as Advocate Sohan Kapoor (2004–2005)
- Shweta Kawatra as Esha Chopra (2001–2002; 2003–2004)
- Manav Gohil / Hiten Tejwani as Vishal Mehra (2001–2002) / (2003)
- Tasneem Sheikh as Jyoti Deshmukh / Jyoti Vishal Mehra (2001–2003)
- Smita Singh / Smriti Shetty as Sonali Deshmukh (2001–2002) / (2002–2003)
- Savita Prabhune as Sumitra Vishwanath Deshmukh (2001–2005)
- S.K. Batra / Saurabh Dubey as Vishwanath Deshmukh (2001–2002) / (2002–2003)
- Nitin Trivedi as Nitin Kapoor (2001–2005)
- Rupa Divetia as Sarala Nitin Kapoor (2001–2005)
- Pratim Parekh as Kapil Kapoor (2001–2005)
- Manisha Kanojia / Usha Bachani as Arundhati Kapil Kapoor (2001–2004) / (2004–2005)
- Moonmoon Banerjee / Kanika Kohli as Ruhi Kapoor (2001–2002) / (2003)
- Bakul Thakkar as Lalit "Lali" Kapoor (2001–2005)
- Raymon Singh / Natasha Rana as Nikita Malhotra / Nikita Lalit Kapoor (2001–2005) / (2005)
- Jennifer Winget as Simran (2003–2004)
- Harmeet Gulzar / Vishal Watwani as Yash Deshmukh (2001–2002) / (2002–2003)
- Simple Kaul as Aastha Kanwar / Aastha Yash Deshmukh (2002–2003)
- Rajesh Kumar / Amit Behl as Shashank Deshmukh (2001–2003) / (2005)
- Chandni Toor / Monalika Bhonsle as Priyanka Shashank Deshmukh (2001–2002) / (2003)
- Vishal Puri as Jimmy Tolani (2002–2003)
- Puneet Vashisht as Anil Nagpal (2001–2002)
- Amar Upadhyay as Dr. Abhinav Gautam (2005)
- Abir Goswami as Sandeep "Sangu" Gujral (2001–2002)
- Vikas Bhalla as Mohnish Manchandani (2002–2003)
- Sonia Sahni as Mrs. Talwar (Siddharth's Nanimaa) (2002–2003)
- Amita Chandekar as Raima Talwar (2002–2003)
- Abhimanyu Singh as Ajay Maliya (2002; 2003)
- Ekta Sharma as Tanya Kapoor: Kapil and Arundhati's younger daughter; Ruhi's younger sister; Siddharth's ex–fiancèe (2001–2004; 2005)
- Prabha Sinha as Reema Talwar / Reema Raman Kanwar (2002–2003)
- Kruttika Desai / Unknown as Devanshi Narang / Devanshi Raman Kanwar (2002–2003) / (2003)
- Anil Dhawan as Raman Kanwar (2003) (Dead)
- Karishma Tanna as Muskaan Kanwar (2002)
- Sonia Kapoor as Naina Bajaj (2002)
- Priya Sampat as Simran Kanwar (2002–2003)
- Shivani Manchanda as Meghna Yash Deshmukh (2001–2002)
- Pratibha Goregaonkar as Sujata, Meghna's mother (2001–2002)
- Pratap Sachdev as Mr. Shastri, Sujata's brother (2001–2002)
- Malavika Arora as Mrs. Shastri, Meghna's maternal grandmother; Sujata and Mr. Shastri's mother (2001–2002)
- Bhumika Seth as Pamela "Pammi" Kanwar (2002–2003)
- Akhil Ghai as Rajeev Rawal (2002; 2003)
- Anand Suryavanshi as Gautam Bajaj (2001)
- Sandeep Baswana as Kamal (2002)
- Chinky Jaiswal as Child Simi Gautam (2005)
- Vinay Jain as Devkant Sahay (2002)
- Apurva Gupta as Child Sohan Kapoor (2001–2002; 2003)
- Mitalee Jagtap Varadkar as Sharmila, Kusum's office colleague and friend (2001–2002)
- Kusumit Sana as Suzanne (2001–2002)
- Talat Rekhi as Yash Raichand (2005)
- Neelam Mehra as Mrs. Raichand (2005)
- Saurabh Arya as Harry (2003–2005)
- Deepak Dutta as Shabir (2004)
- Preeti Puri as Jenny Anthony (2005) (Dead)
- Aliraza Namdar as Jagmohan Agarwal (2002; 2003)
- Anju Mahendru as Neelam Oberoi
- Sudha Shivpuri as Jimmy's grandmother (2002)
- Tarana Raja as Sonia Jhulka (2002)
- Shabnam Mishra as Mallika Bedi (2002)
- Kiran Dubey as Shivani Hinduja (2002)
- Kuljeet Randhawa as Shaila Khan (2002)
- Nilofer Khan as Geetika Mathur (2002)
- Shraddha Sharma as Preeti Mathur (2002)
- Kaushal Kapoor as Judge (2003)
- Sumukhi Pendse as Priya Sachdev, Garv and Garima's Paternal Aunt (2004)
- Rio Kapadia as Vikram Sachdev (2004)
- Reshma Modi as Meenakshi Vikram Sachdev (2004)
- Prakash Ramchandani as Prakash Chitre (2001; 2002)
- Anuj Gupta as Mack (2001–2002)
- Kunal Kumar as Cyrus (2001)
- Manmeet Gulzar as Radheshyam "Guddu" (2002)
- Rajesh Sabharwal as Rahul Kapoor (2001; 2002)
- Ritu Deepak as Poonam Rahul Kapoor (2001)
- Shamim Sheikh as Manohar Singh, Nikita's Tauji (2002)
- Afshan Khan as Monica (2001)
- Jayant Rawal as Ramakant (2001–2002)
- Faizan Kidwai as Manik (2002–2003)
- Bobby Bhonsle as Bobby (2002–2003)
- Sujata Sanghamitra as Vandana Vishal Mehra (2003)
- Madhur Arora as Agnivesh (2004–2005)
- Anand Abhyankar as Priyanka's father (2002)
- Utkarsha Naik as Uma (Priyanka's mother) (2002)
- Rajita Puniani as Bansi: Vishwanath's sister's daughter; Shashank, Kusum, Jyoti, Yash and Sonali's younger cousin (2001)
- Nimisha Vakharia as Sarita Joshi: Sumitra's neighbour (2001)
- Nitin Vakharia as Mr. Joshi: Vishwanath's neighbour; Sarita's husband (2001)
- Darshan Dave as Mohit Srivastav (2001)
- Rocky Verma as Kidnapper (2005)
- Rishina Kandhari as Sonia (2004)
- Sakett Saawhney as A.C.P. Saket Sahni (2004–2005)
- Varun Vardhan as Ramesh Iyer (2001)
- Sukanya Kulkarni as Sukanya Deshmukh (2003-2005)

=== Special appearances ===
- Eijaz Khan as Varun Raheja from Kahiin To Hoga (2004)
- Poonam Joshi as Mehak Varun Raheja from Kahiin To Hoga (2004)
- Shakti Anand as Party Host (2005)
- Hiten Tejwani as Samay Punj from Kkoi Dil Mein Hai (2005)
- Karishma Tanna as Kritika Samay Punj from Kkoi Dil Mein Hai (2005)
- Apurva Agnihotri as Armaan Suri from Jassi Jaissi Koi Nahin (2005)
- Rakhi Vijan as Anjali Suri from Jassi Jaissi Koi Nahin (2005)
- Mahru Sheikh as Ila Purushottam Suri from Jassi Jaissi Koi Nahin (2005)

== Episode list ==
Episode Number	Episode Summary	Date Of Telecast

== Adaptations ==
Language	Title	Original release	Network(s)	Last aired	Notes
Marathi	Tumchya Aamchyatali Kusum तुमच्या आमच्यातली कुसुम	4 October 2021	Sony Marathi	26 February 2022	Remake
