= Char Divas Sasuche =

Indian television series

- Genre: Family drama
- Written by: Abhijit Pendharkar; Smita Prakashkar
- Directed by: Khalil Herekar
- Starring: See below
- Opening theme: "Char Divas Sasuche" by Mahalakshmi Iyer
- Composer: Kaushal Inamdar
- Country of origin: India
- Original language: Marathi
- No. of episodes: 3,147

Production
- Producers: Baburao Borde; Naresh Borde
- Production locations: Mumbai, Maharashtra, India
- Camera setup: Multi-camera
- Running time: 22 minutes
- Production company: Siddhivinayak Productions

Original release
- Network: ETV Marathi
- Release: 26 November 2001 – 5 January 2013

Char Divas Sasuche (transl. Four days of a mother-in-law) is an Indian Marathi language TV series which aired on Colors Marathi. It starred Rohini Hattangadi and Kavita Lad in lead roles. It was premiered from 26 November 2001 and ended on 5 January 2013 completing 3,147 episodes.

It is the first Marathi series which entered the Limca Book of Records as the longest-running series on Indian television. This series created a history in the Indian Television by becoming the first Indian series across other languages to cross both 2000 and 3000 episodes and ran for 11 years.

== Plot ==
Ashalata and Anuradha, the pillars of the Deshmukh family, who have been portrayed as an ideal women, deals with life practically and fights it out when necessary as they strived for the well being of their family. Ashalata Deshmukh is the matriarch of the Deshmukh family whose decisions and words are followed. Her son Ravi goes against her decision and marries Anuradha who is a very simple, sensible and a self-respecting girl. Anuradha is unaware that she married Ravi against his mother's wish. The story follows on how will she get Ravi's support and copes up with the family. Overall, it is the saga of human relationships around the Deshmukh family - tales of love and hate, losses and victories, good and evil, strength and perseverance.

== Cast ==
=== Main ===
- Rohini Hattangadi as Ashalata Prataprao Deshmukh
- Kavita Lad / Sulekha Talwalkar as Anuradha Ravi Deshmukh
- Pankaj Vishnu / Rajesh Shringarpure / Aditya Vaidya as Ravi Prataprao Deshmukh

=== Recurring ===
- Jayant Ghate as Prataprao Deshmukh
- Shailesh Datar / Sagar Talashikar /Anand Kale as Ashok Prataprao Deshmukh
- Prajakta Kulkarni as Nandini Ashok Deshmukh
- Vivek Lagoo as Shrikant Prataprao Deshmukh
- Mugdha Godbole-Ranade as Renuka Shrikant Deshmukh
- Abhijeet Kelkar as Parth Ravi Deshmukh
- Pallavi Vaidya as Riya Parth Deshmukh
- Vikas Patil as Shubham Ravi Deshmukh
- Kashmira Kulkarni as Urmila Shubham Deshmukh
- Ashwini Apte as Sanika Ashok Deshmukh
- Priya Marathe as Sona Ashok Deshmukh
- Manasi Naik as Priyanka Shubham Deshmukh
- Pallavi Subhash as Mrudula
- Prasad Oak as Vivek
- Samira Gujar as Meera
- Ajay Padhye as Sudesh
- Bhargavi Chirmule as Gauri Ravi Deshmukh
- Samir Vijay as Vicky Ravi Deshmukh
- Vilas Ujwane as Mohan Sardesai
- Smita Oak as Seema Mohan Sardesai
- Shrikant Desai as Sushant Subhedar
- Sarika Nilatkar as Malati Sushant Subhedar
- Uma Sardeshmukh as Gokhale Bai
- Madhavi Nimkar as Prajakta
- Vijay Mishra as Dhananjay Mohite
- Sunila Karambelkar as Supriya Shrikant Deshmukh / Supriya Sushant Subhedar
- Shweta Shinde as Nisha Mohan Sardesai
- Anand Abhyankar
- Trupti Bhoir

== Reception ==
Week	Year	TAM TVR	Rank		Ref.
Week	Year	TAM TVR	Mah/Goa	All India	Ref.
Week 47	2008	0.78	5	72	
Week 50	2008	0.78	5	97	
Week 1	2009	0.82	3	92	
Week 3	2009	0.98	4	73	
Week 5	2009	1.0	2	69	
Week 6	2009	0.87	3	80	
Week 9	2009	0.9	1	81	
Week 14	2009	0.9	2	74	
Week 15	2009	0.81	4	86	
Week 16	2009	0.81	2	92	
Week 17	2009	0.78	3	94	
Week 18	2009	0.8	2	89	
Week 19	2009	0.7	4	94	
Week 22	2009	0.78	4	89	
Week 26	2009	0.78	3	82	
Week 33	2009	0.8	2	84	
Week 50	2009	0.7	4	96	
