= Chhodo Kal Ki Baatein =

2023 Indian Hindi-language film

- Directed by: Pramod Joshi
- Screenplay by: Pramod Joshi; Raz Kazi (dialogues)
- Story by: Pramod Joshi
- Produced by: Shashank Bhapkar
- Starring: Anupam Kher; Sachin Khedekar
- Cinematography: Salil Sahastrabuddhe
- Edited by: Shankh Rajadhyaksha
- Music by: Bapi–Tutul
- Release date: 12 April 2012
- Running time: 127 Minutes
- Country: India
- Language: Hindi

Chhodo Kal Ki Baatein (Hindi:छोड़ो कल की बातें) is an Indian Hindi-language comedy film written and directed by Pramod Joshi. It stars Anupam Kher, Sachin Khedekar and Atul Parchure in lead roles. The music of the film is composed by Bapi–Tutul.

== Cast ==
- Anupam Kher as Benaam Kumar
- Sachin Khedekar as Aditya Pradhan
- Atul Parchure as Mohan
- Swapnil Rajshekhar as Patil
- Mrinal Kulkarni
- Vijay Patkar as Dhobi Ramsharan
- Aanjjan Srivastav as Shuklaji
- Rajesh Vivek as Upasani
- Shruti Welankar as Tanisha
- Barkha Bisht Sengupta
- Raghavendra Kadkol as Anna
- Suresh Menon as RDX
- Kishori Shahane
- Kishore Pradhan as doctor

== Plot ==
A workaholic wakes up to find himself stuck in a time warp. What follows is a series of bizarre events, until he meets a mystery man who gives him life-changing lessons.
