= Arvind Joshi =

Indian actor (1936–2021)

- Born: 1936; Bombay, Bombay Presidency, British India
- Died: 29 January 2021 (aged 84–85); Mumbai, Maharashtra, India
- Occupations: Actor; Playwright; director
- Spouse: Usha Joshi (m. 1957)
- Children: Manasi Joshi Roy (daughter); Sharman Joshi (son)
- Relatives: Pravin Joshi (brother)

Arvind Joshi (1936 – 29 January 2021) was an Indian film and theatre actor, playwright and director known for his work in Gujarati theatre and Gujarati cinema. He was the father of actors Manasi Joshi Roy and Sharman Joshi.

== Biography ==
He was born and raised in Mumbai. He worked as a theatre artist for around a decade before starting his career in Hindi film industry. He played major roles in Gujarati films including Garvo Garasiyo, Gher Gher Matina Chula and Dhola Maru, Tadka Chhaya, Mendi Rang Lagyo and Govaliyo. He acted in Hindi films like Sholay (1975), Ittefaq (1969), Apmaan Ki Aag (1990), Ab To Aaja Saajan Mere, and Love Marriage.

He died on 29 January 2021 in Vile Parle, Mumbai, aged 84. He was married and had two children, Manasi Joshi Roy and Sharman Joshi.

He acted in the play like Rahuketu, Lady Lalkunwar, Khelando, Banshayya, Baraf Na Chehra, Jaldi Kar Koi Joee Jashe.

== Filmography ==
=== Hindi films ===
- Ittefaq (1969)
- Gupt Gyan (1974)
- Sholay (1975)
- Pati Parmeshwar (1978)
- Love Marriage (1984)
- Chhota Aadmi (1986)
- Uddhar (1986)
- Naam (1986)
- Thikana (1987)
- Kharidar (1988)
- Apmaan Ki Aag (1990)
- Pyaar Ka Toofan (1990)
- Ab To Aaja Saajan Mere (1994)
- Godmother (1999)

=== Gujarati films ===
- Chundadi Chokha (1961)
- Kanku (1969)
- Hasta Melap (1969)
- Veli Ni Aavya Phool (1970)
- Janamteep (1974)
- Raa Maandlik (1975)
- Ver No Waras (1976)
- Daku Rani Ganga (1976)
- Gher Gher Matina Chula (1977)
- Garvo Garasiyo (1979)
- Putra Vadhu (1982)
- Dhola Maru (1983)
- Footpath Ni Rani (1984)
- Maa Na Aansu (1984)
- Nana Vagar No Nathiyo (1984)
- Jagat Jogini Maa Khodiyar (2006)
- Char Dishayen Maa Chaherma (2000)
