= Ram Nagarkar =

Marathi actor and stand up comedian

Ram Vithoba Nagarkar (Marathi: राम विठोबा नगरकर; 1930 - 1995) was a noted Marathi film and stage actor and a stand up comedian, who has been called "a phenomenon in Marathi literature". His autobiography and solo stand up show Ramnagari (1975) were very popular.

== Biography ==
Nagarkar was born in Sarole, Ahmednagar, Maharashtra, on 5 April 1930. He was a member of the Nai or Nhavi barber caste. He moved to Mumbai with his parents, and became a member of a socialist youth group, the Rashtra Seva Dal, and was active in its travelling theatre group presenting Marathi improvised folk plays, tamasha or loknatya, with Nilu Phule and Dada Kondke. He had a "large following" on the stage, and also appeared in many Marathi-language films, most notably Sarvasakshi (1978) and Ek Daav Bhutacha (1982).

In 1975, he published an autobiography, Ramnagari. It has been described by various critics as "remarkable for its delightful abandon," "an inspired creation" and a "great contribution[] to Marathi humour", showing "an ever-ready, irrepressible and ebullient sense of humour." This was made into a Hindi-language film directed by Kantilal Rathod, with Amol Palekar, Sulabha Deshpande, Suhasini Mulay, Nilu Phule and Nagarkar himself. In 1980, Nagarkar also developed a one-act show, also called Ramnagari, which he performed many times around India. The book has been taught as a text in the Marathi language course at the University of Delhi.

== Legacy ==
An annual award in his memory has been presented since 2020, named the Ram Nagarkar Kalagaurav Award.

== Filmography ==
- 1972 - Harya Narya Zindabad
- 1978 - Sarvasakshi
- 1982 - Ek Daav Bhutacha
- 1982 - Ramnagari
