= Naan Avan Illai 2 =

- Poster
- Directed by: Selvaa
- Written by: Selvaa; Pattukkottai Prabakar (dialogues)
- Produced by: V. Hitesh Jhabak
- Starring: Jeevan; Sangeetha; Lakshmi Rai; Shweta Menon; Shruti Marathe; Rachana Maurya
- Cinematography: Balamurugan
- Music by: D. Imman
- Production company: Nemichand Jhabak
- Distributed by: Eros International
- Release date: 27 November 2009
- Running time: 125 minutes
- Country: India
- Language: Tamil

Naan Avan Illai 2 (transl. I Am Not Him 2) is a 2009 Indian Tamil-language film directed by Selvaa. It is the sequel to Naan Avan Illai (2007). Jeevan reprises the lead role, while the female roles are enacted by Sangeetha, Lakshmi Rai, Shweta Menon, Shruti Marathe, and Rachana Maurya. D. Imman, who did the score for the first film, replaced Vijay Antony as the music director. The film was released on 27 November 2009.

== Plot ==
Two years after the events of the first film, Annamalai's (Jeevan) photograph appears in a newspaper along with an interview of Maria (Rachana Maurya), who claims herself to be a saint propounding a new faith. She describes him as her God, Vaali. A mafia-turned-spiritualist, she attributes her transformation to him in the interview. This prompts three women to come calling Maria all the way. The three women were cheated by him recently, and they probe Maria of Annamalai's whereabouts. The three women – Sakhi (Sruthi Marathe), Nisha (Swetha Menon) and an actress named Deepa (Lakshmi Rai) – try to prove to Maria that he was a cheat. However, she does not believe them. Meanwhile, Annamalai suffers bleeding injuries in an accident. Mahalakshmi alias Mahi (Sangeetha), a Lankan woman who runs a restaurant, nurses him back to health. On seeing Mahi separated from his daughter by her late husband's (Krishna) family, he decides to reunite them.

== Cast ==
- Jeevan in a various role as Joseph Fernandez / Annamalai / Magesh / Aravind / Barath and Sarath / Vali / David
- Sangeetha as Mahalakshmi (Mahi)
- Lakshmi Rai as Deepa
- Shweta Menon as Nisha
- Shruti Marathe as Saki
- Rachana Maurya as Maria
- Krishna as Mahalakshmi's husband
- Mayilsamy as Annamalai's assistant
- Rajkapoor as Deepa's brother
- Yog Japee as Nisha's customer

== Soundtrack ==
The soundtrack was composed by D. Imman.

No.	Title	Lyrics	Singer(s)	Length
1.	"Baaga Unnara"	Viveka	Udit Narayan, SuVi
2.	"Manmadha Leelai"	Pa. Vijay	Shail Hada, Nithyasree, Benny Dayal
3.	"Naangu Kangal"	Pa. Vijay	Javed Ali, Shreya Ghoshal
4.	"O Mariya"	Vaali	D. Imman, Jyotsna Radhakrishnan
5.	"Sollamaley"	Yugabharathi	Sadhana Sargam
6.	"Southern Aroma" (Instrumental)	–	Andrea Jeremiah
7.	"Thooyavaney"	Viveka	Neha Bhasin

== Critical reception ==
Sify wrote, "The film is predictable at every turn and the second half drags big time". Pavithra Srinivasan of Rediff.com wrote "A little bit of sentiment and massive dollops of entertainment, that's Naan Avan Illai 2, for you. It lacks a bit of the first movie's originality but if its two-and-a half-hours of no holds barred fun is what you want then this is your best bet". Malathi Rangarajan of The Hindu wrote, "The story lacks plausibility, yet if you find NAI -2 quite engaging, it is because of Selvaa's [skillful] screenplay. The film is racy till the end and that makes it watch-worthy enough". Deccan Herald wrote, "If you have seen one, you have seen it all. Sequels seldom offer anything new". The New Indian Express wrote, "Neither taxing your brains, nor making any pretensions, Naan 2 is a fluffy, fun-filled entertainer".
