= Gadbad Ghotala =

1986 Indian Marathi-language comedy drama film

- Directed by: Raja Bargir
- Written by: Datta Keshav
- Produced by: S.P. Ahluwalia
- Starring: Ashok Saraf; Laxmikant Berde; Sharad Talwalkar; Nilu Phule; Savita Prabhune; Smita Talwalkar; Prema Kiran
- Cinematography: Suryakant Lavande
- Edited by: Vijay Khochikar
- Music by: Suresh Kumar
- Production company: Eagle International Enterprises
- Release date: 1986
- Running time: 135 minutes
- Country: India
- Language: Marathi

Gadbad Ghotala (transl. Messy Scam) is an Indian 1986 Marathi-language comedy film directed by Raja Bargir and produced by Eagle International Enterprises. The film starring Ashok Saraf, Laxmikant Berde, Sharad Talwalkar, Nilu Phule, Savita Prabhune, Smita Talwalkar, Prema Kiran.

== Plot ==
Bhimrao (Sharad Talwalkar) lives with his second wife (Manorama Wagle), his son Pralhad (Laxmikant Berde), and his daughter Manisha (Savita Prabhune). Frustrated by his family's ever-increasing demands, he decides to contest the local elections against Dhole. Encouraged by Khalave (Nilu Phule), Bhimrao spends heavily on his campaign and is persuaded to mortgage his ancestral village land to finance it. Around the same time, Sadanand (Shekhar Navare), a distant relative with an intellectual disability, comes to stay with the family. He is neglected and treated disrespectfully by most of the household. Meanwhile, Dhole's son, Hemant (Ashok Saraf), and Bhimrao's daughter, Manisha, are in love. As they campaign for their respective fathers, Hemant and Pralhad realize that the election should be won by the most deserving and honest candidate rather than simply supporting their families.

As the campaign expenses mount, Bhimrao informs his family that he has also mortgaged his bungalow and fears they may soon be burdened with debt. The family's attitude changes dramatically when Sadanand unexpectedly inherits a large sum of money, prompting those who had mistreated him to treat him with newfound respect. The story explores the consequences of greed, political ambition, and changing family values through a satirical lens.

== Cast ==
- Laxmikant Berde as Pralhad
- Prema Kiran as Chitra
- Nilu Phule as Khalave
- Ashok Saraf as Hemant Dhole
- Savita Prabhune as Manisha
- Smita Talwalkar as Anu
- Shekhar Navare as Sadanand
- Sharad Talwalkar as Bhimrao
- Manorama Wagle as Bhimrao's wife

== Original soundtrack ==
Gadbad Ghotala

Soundtrack album by Suresh Kumar
- Released: 1986
- Genre: Feature film soundtrack
- Length: 22:00
- Language: Marathi
- Label: Ishtar Music

The music is composed by Suresh Kumar and songs are sung by Anuradha Paudwal, Suresh Wadkar, Uttara Kelkar, Azhar Javed. Sound recording was done by Ganpat Gawade at Venus Recorders Ad Cassettes, Mumbai.

=== Track listing ===
#	Title	Singer (s)	Length
1	"Majhyach Mage Kiti Lagshil Go"	Suresh Kumar	3:30
2	"Surya Ugavato Nabhat"	Suresh Kumar	4:49
3	"Tujhe Majhe Nate Raja"	Uttara Kelkar	5:01
4	"Ekant Bephat Aani Varahi Pisat"	Uttara Kelkar	4:26
5	"Aabhalache Panghrun"	Azhar Javed	4:16
