= Phoolwanti =

- Written by: Babasaheb Purandare
- Starring: Arun Govil; Archana Joglekar; Savita Prabhune
- Music by: Hridaynath Mangeshkar
- Original language: Hindi
- No. of seasons: 1

Production
- Producer: Usha Mangeshkar

Original release
- Network: DD National
- Release: 1992

Phoolwanti is an Indian musical drama TV series broadcast on Doordarshan in 1992, starring Arun Govil, Archana Joglekar and Savita Prabhune. The show was produced by Usha Mangeshkar, with music by Hridaynath Mangeshkar and playback singing by Lata Mangeshkar. The show was based on a story by writer Babasaheb Purandare, with screenplay, dialogues and lyrics by Vasant Deo.

The show was Directed by National Award winner Director Producer Cameraman Mahesh Satoskar, who has also Produced and Directed Marathi Film Mahananda Nivdung kas And popular serials like Mahashweta Mahadwar Paashanpatee.

== Premise ==
In 18th century Pune, a beautiful dancer Phoolwanti (Archana Joglekar), takes umbrage to a comment on her by classical music exponent (Shastri ji, played by Arun Govil). They have a competitive bet, and they that whoever loses, that person will become disciple of the winner. Phoolwanti loses in the competition, becomes a student of Shastriji, and comes to live in his house, much to the concern of his wife (played by Savita Prabhune).

== Cast ==
- Arun Govil as Pandit Venkatesh Shastri
- Archana Joglekar as Phoolwanti
- Savita Prabhune as Shastri's wife
