= Shailesh Datar =

Indian film, television and stage actor

- Born: 26 May 1967 (age 59)
- Other name: Shailesh Dattar
- Occupation: Actor
- Years active: 1999–present

Shailesh Datar is an Indian film, television and stage actor, who started in Marathi theatre and television. He is best known for playing role of sage Narada in the mythological TV series Devon Ke Dev...Mahadev (2012). Prior to it he gained popularity while playing the role of Moropant Tambe, the father of Rani Lakshmibai in TV series, Jhansi Ki Rani (2009–2011) and in Baba Aiso Varr Dhoondo as the female lead's father, the shows rerun is telecasted on Dangal TV (2010–2012).

== Career ==
He has acted in TV series include, Bandhan Saat Janamon Ka (2008–2009), Aan, Main Teri Parchhain Hoon, Banoo Main Teri Dulhan (2006-2009), and Char Divas Sasuche (2005) on ETV Marathi. He is also known for his role as Ravsaheb, in Marathi play Barrister, written by Jaywant Dalvi and directed by Vikram Gokhale. He also did role of Amatya Ugrasen in Colors TV serial Chakravartin Ashoka Samrat.

== Filmography ==
- Ladhaai (1999)
- Bhulwa (2007) as Police Inspector Shivraj Patil
- Raghuveer (2024) as Gopajipant Deshpande
- Gulaabi (2024) as Ashitosh Apte
- Hi Anokhi Gaath (2024)
- Sangeet Manapmaan (2025) as Senapati Kakasaheb

== Television ==
Year	Title	Role	Notes	Ref.
2001	Char Divas Sasuche	Ashok Prataprao Deshmukh		
2007–2008	Asambhav	Balkrishna Shastri		
2008	Bandhan Saat Janamon Ka	Trilok Agarwal		
2008–2010	Kulvadhu	Indraneel Rajeshirke		
2008–2009	Main Teri Parchhain Hoon	Ravikant		
2008–2009	Banoo Main Teri Dulhann	Pradhanji		
2009–2011	Jhansi Ki Rani	Moropant Tambe		
2010–2012	Baba Aiso Varr Dhoondo	Rupesh Chauhan		
2011–2014	Devon Ke Dev...Mahadev	Narada		
2012	Unch Majha Zoka	Annasaheb Kurlekar		
2013–2015	Asava Sundar Swapnancha Bangla	Girish Mohite–Patil		
2015	Chakravartin Ashoka Samrat	Amatya Ugrasen		
2015	Bharat Ka Veer Putra – Maharana Pratap	Tulsidas		
2016	Kahani Hamari... Dil Dosti Deewanepan Ki	Mr.Vadhera		
2016	Siya Ke Ram	Narada		
2016–2017	Brahmarakshas	Nalin Shrivastav		
2017	Chandrakanta	Pandit Jagannath		
2017–2019	Radha Prem Rangi Rangli	Madavrao Nimbalkar		
2018	Shakti – Astitva Ke Ehsaas Ki	Doctor		
2020–2024	Ghum Hai Kisikey Pyaar Meiin	Ninad Chavan		
2022–2024	Tuzech Mi Geet Gaat Aahe	Vikram Rajadhyakash		
2026	Taskaree	Ramesh Bhai		
2026–present	Dr. Aarambhi	Dr. Sunil Tandon		
2026–present	Hastinapur Ke Veer	Veda Vyasa		
