= Atul Parchure =

Indian actor (1966–2024)

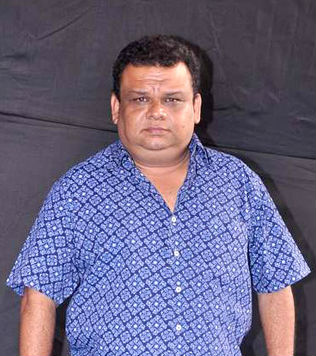
- Parchure at the Indian Telly Awards in 2018
- Born: Atul Parchure; 30 November 1966; Bombay, Maharashtra, India
- Died: 14 October 2024 (aged 57); Mumbai, Maharashtra, India
- Occupation: Actor
- Years active: 1985–2024
- Known for: Acting
- Spouse: Sonia Parchure
- Children: 1

Atul Parchure (30 November 1966 – 14 October 2024) was an Indian actor who performed in films, television serials and on stage. He was mainly known for his comedic roles in Marathi and Hindi film industry. Mainly a film actor, he starred in plays like Vasu Chi Sasu, Priyatama, and Tarun Turk Mhatare Arka. Notable movies include Navra Maza Navsacha, Salaam-e-Ishq, Partner, All the Best: Fun Begins, Khatta Meetha, Bbuddah... Hoga Terra Baap.

Parchure worked on Zee Marathi's show Jaago Mohan Pyare along with Supriya Pathare and Shruti Marathe. He also acted as the protagonist in Bhago Mohan Pyare on Zee Marathi which is the sequel of Jaago Mohan Pyare. He received Best Actor and Best Comedy Character Awards in Zee Marathi Utsav Natyancha Awards 2019 due to this serial.

Parchure died from liver cancer in Mumbai, on 14 October 2024, at the age of 57.

== Films ==
Year	Film	Role	Language	notes
1985	Khichdi		Marathi	as child artist
1993	Bedardi	Thambi	Hindi	
2000	Phir Bhi Dil Hai Hindustani	Shahid Akram	Hindi	
2001	Style		Hindi	
2001	Kyo Kii... Main Jhuth Nahin Bolta		Hindi	
2001	Meri Pyaari Bahania Banegi Dulhania		Hindi	
2002	Chor Machaaye Shor		Hindi	
2002	Kyaa Dil Ne Kahaa		Hindi	
2003	Jajantaram Mamantaram		Hindi	
2003	Calcutta Mail		Hindi	
2003	God Only Knows		Hindi	
2004	Tumsa Nahin Dekha	Jiya's brother	Hindi	
2004	Navra Maza Navsacha	vaky's friend	Marathi	
2005	Anjaane – The Unknown	Nandu	Hindi	
2005	Kalyug	Bhaskar Rajput	Hindi	
2005	Kyon Ki		Hindi	
2005	Yakeen	Siddharth Thakur	Hindi	
2005	Chakachak		Hindi	
2006	Mera Dil Leke Dekkho		Hindi	
2006	Goolmaal	Detective Bhanudas Bhinge	Marathi	
2007	It's Breaking News	Rafique	Hindi	
2007	Partner	Assistant Cop	Hindi	
2007	Awarapan	Siddharth Sood	Hindi	
2007	Salaam-E-Ishq	Sukhi	Hindi	
2008	Amhi Satpute	Chandya	Marathi	
2009	Be Dune Saade Chaar	Dhodapkar	Marathi	
2009	All The Best	Dhondu	Hindi	
2009	Detective Naani	Petook	Hindi	
2009	Billu Barber	Charandas Chaubey	Hindi	
2010	Khatta Meetha	Chintan	Hindi	
2010	Muskurake Dekh Zara	Elton	Hindi	
2010	Swaha: Life Beyond Superstition	Employee at clock repair shop	Hindi	
2011	Bbuddah... Hoga Terra Baap	Inspector at Airport	Hindi	
2011	Zhakaas	Inspector Jadhav	Marathi	
2012	Love Recipe	Anthony	Hindi	
2012	Chhodo Kal Ki Baatein	Mohan	Hindi	
2013	Narbachi Wadi	Dattoba Lingappa Kaikini	Marathi	
2013	Bin Phere Free Me Ttere		Hindi	
2013	Choron Ki Baraat	Smile	Hindi	
2013	Zindagi 50 50	Mota	Hindi	
2015	Pappu's Path	Genie	Hindi	
2015	Janiva	Niru Kaka	Marathi	
2017	Braveheart		Marathi	
2023	Rules Ranjann	Ranjan's coworker	Telugu	
2024	Gharat Ganpati	Ganapati	Marathi	voice
2024	Alibaba Aani Chalishitale Chor	Doctor	Marathi	

== Theater ==
Play	Year	Role	Language
Tarun Turk Mhatare Arka			Marathi
Priyatama			Marathi
Vasu Chi Sasu			Marathi
Aamhi Ani Aamche Bap	2017		Marathi
Wah Guru!			Marathi

== Television ==
- R. K. Laxman Ki Duniya – Bhavesh Vasavda
- Comedy Nights with Kapil – various characters
- Comedy Circus (season) – Himself
- Comedy Circus Ke Ajoobe – Guest performance with Rajiv Thakur, Paresh Ganatra, Sunil Grover
- Bh Se Bhade – Bhimsen Ganguly (Boss)
- Badi Door Se Aaye Hai – Ghost (cameo)
- Yam Hain Hum – Chitragupt
- Honar Soon Mi Hya Gharchi – Sadanand Borkar (Janhavi's Boss)
- Jaago Mohan Pyare – Mohan Mhatre
- Bhago Mohan Pyare – Mohan Ashtaputre
- Ali Mili Gupchili – Host
- Majha Hoshil Na – J.D. (Jaywant Desai)
