= Radha Prem Rangi Rangli =

- Genre: Family drama Romance
- Directed by: Ganesh Rasane
- Starring: See below
- Country of origin: India
- Original language: Marathi
- No. of episodes: 440

Production
- Producer: Aarav Jindal
- Cinematography: Ashok Pawar
- Editor: Lalsahab Yadav
- Running time: 22 minutes
- Production company: Yuforiya Productions

Original release
- Network: Colors Marathi
- Release: 24 November 2017 – 30 March 2019

Radha Prem Rangi Rangli is Indian Marathi-language television series which aired on Colors Marathi. It premiered from 27 November 2017 and ended on 30 March 2019 completing 440 episodes.

== Plot ==
It is a story focusing on Radha and Prem, who have 2 different school of thoughts. However, they both love their siblings too much and will go to any extent for their smile. The story said how these two opposite personalities will finally find love for each other.

== Cast ==
=== Main ===
- Sachit Patil as Prem Deshmukh – Madhuri's son; Vishwanath's step-son; Anvita's half-brother; Deepika's step-cousin and ex-fiancé; Radha's husband.
- Veena Jagtap as Radha Nimbalkar Deshmukh – Madhavrao and Nalini's daughter; Aditya's sister; Prem's wife.

=== Recurring ===
- Kavita Lad as Madhuri Paranjape – Vishwanath's wife; Prem and Anvita's mother.
- Shailesh Datar as Madhavrao Nimbalkar – Mrs. Nimbalkar's son; Nalini's husband; Aditya and Radha's father.
- Aparna Aparajit as Nalini Nimbalkar – Madhavrao's wife; Aditya and Radha's mother.
- Vidya Karanjikar as Mrs. Nimbalkar – Madhavrao's mother; Aditya and Radha's grandmother.
- Niranjan Namjoshi as Aditya Nimbalkar – Madhavrao and Nalini's son; Radha's brother; Anvita's husband.
- Akshaya Gurav as Anvita Paranjape Nimbalkar – Madhuri and Vishwanath's daughter; Prem's half-sister; Deepika's cousin; Aditya's wife.
- Gautam Joglekar as Vishwanath Paranjape – Shakuntala's brother; Madhuri's husband; Anvita's father; Prem's step-father.
- Rugvedi Pradhan as Shravni – Radha and Aditya's aunt.
- Sarika Navathe as Shakuntala Paranjape – Vishwanath's sister; Deepika's mother.
- Archana Nipankar as Deepika Paranjape – Shakuntala's daughter; Anvita's cousin; Prem's step-cousin and ex-fiancée.
