= Love You Zindagi =

- Directed by: Manoj Sawant
- Screenplay by: Shripad Joshi, Manoj Sawant
- Story by: Manoj Sawant
- Produced by: Sachin Bamgude
- Starring: Sachin Pilgaonkar; Kavita Lad; Prarthana Behere
- Cinematography: Parag Deshmukh
- Production company: SP Productions
- Distributed by: AA Films
- Release date: 11 January 2019
- Country: India
- Language: Marathi

Love You Zindagi is a 2019 Marathi-language film directed by Manoj Sawant and produced by Sachin Bamgude, The film stars Sachin Pilgaonkar, Prarthana Behere, and Kavita Lad.

== Cast ==
- Sachin Pilgaonkar
- Prarthana Behere
- Kavita Lad
- Atul Parchure
- Samir Choughule

== Reception ==
The film received 3.0/5 rating from The Times of India.

== Music ==
No.	Title	Lyrics	Music	Singer(s)	Length
1.	"Jawani Janeman"	Abhishek Khankar	Samir Saptiskar	Sachin Pilgaonkar	5:26
2.	"Kadhi Hur Kadhi Phur"	Abhishek Khankar	Samir Saptiskar	Avadhoot Gupte	4:08
Total length:					9:34
