= Gharwali Uparwali =

- Gharwali Uparwali
- Genre: Sitcom
- Created by: Nirja Guleri
- Written by: Shrey Guleri
- Directed by: Shrey Guleri
- Starring: Mukul Dev; Ratna Pathak Shah; Niki Aneja Walia; Manasi Joshi Roy; Sudha Chandran; Sudhir Pandey; Mickey Dhamejani
- Theme music composer: Raju Singh
- Opening theme: “Gharwali Uparwali” sung by Babul Supriyo
- Country of origin: India
- Original language: Hindi
- No. of episodes: 156

Production
- Executive producer: Sahil Guleri
- Producer: Nirja Guleri
- Cinematography: Manoj Soni; Jagannath; Attar Singh Saini
- Camera setup: Multi-camera
- Running time: 22 minutes
- Production company: Prime Channel

Original release
- Network: StarPlus
- Release: 3 July 2000 – 23 June 2003

Related
- Gharwali Uparwali Aur Sunny

Gharwali Uparwali (Translation: My Wife and The Ghost of My First Wife) is an Indian fantasy-sitcom television series which originally aired on StarPlus from 3 July 2000 to 23 June 2003. Gharwali Uparwali received acclaim throughout its run. The show is created by Nirja Guleri. Gharwali Uparwali is written and directed by Shrey Guleri.

Gharwali Uparwali is considered as a milestone on Indian television., It was the first-ever indigenous fantasy-comedy franchise and the instant popularity of this trail-blazing new fantasy-sitcom genre, replete with top-of-the-line visual effects. and which appealed to children and adults,

Gharwali Uparwali has been nominated for several major Television Awards including The Screen Awards for Best Serial (Comedy) in 2000, and The Indian Telly Awards for Comedy/Sitcom Of The Year in 2002.

A sequel series, Gharwali Uparwali Aur Sunny, also created by Nirja Guleri and directed by Shrey Guleri, aired on Star Plus from 11 October 2003.

== Cast ==
=== Main ===
- Mukul Dev as Ravi
- Ratna Pathak Shah as Madam JoJo
- Niki Aneja Walia as Pooja [Gharwali]
- Manasi Joshi Roy as Chandini [Uparwali]
- Sudha Chandran as Pooja's Mother
- Sudhir Pandey as Ravi's Father
- Mickey Dhamejani as Sunny

=== Guest ===
- Rajat Kapoor as Advertising Agency Boss
- Anupam Kher as an eccentric Business Tycoon
- Sanjay Mishra as an idiosyncratic Film Director
- Sharat Saxena as Pooja's Uncle from Africa
- Akhilendra Mishra as Mafia Don
- Bob Christo as Karate Grandmaster
- Kamini Kaushal as Ravi's Governess
- Jayshree T. as Ravi's Aunt
- Kuldeep Pawar as Ravi's Boss
- Shehzad Khan as a fraud Godman
- Lilliput as Master Burglar
- Brahmachari as a sinister Watchman (Haunted House)
- Avtar Gill as Pooja's Uncle
- Urvashi Dholakia as a Femme Fatale Spy
- Ketki Dave as Boisterous Housewife
- Sucheta Khanna as Pooja's Sister
- Sooraj Thapar as Ravi's Friend
- Papiya Sengupta as Ravi's Friend
- Achint Kaur as Pooja's Friend
- Kishori Godbole as Film Star Sridevi's Lookalike
- Amita Nangia as Madam Jojo's Client
- Vinod Singh as Madam Jojo's Assistant
- Adi Irani as Dog Owner
- Neelu Kohli as Dog Owner's Wife
- Ashok Khanna as Karate Trainer

== See also ==
- List of programs broadcast by Star Plus
