= Ek Daav Bhutacha =

- Theatrical release poster
- Directed by: Ravi Namade
- Written by: Dattaram Maruti Mirasdar
- Produced by: Ravi Namade
- Starring: Dilip Prabhavalkar; Ashok Saraf; Ranjana; Mohan Kothiwan; Ram Nagarkar
- Cinematography: A. D. Waddekar
- Edited by: Javed Sayyed
- Music by: Bhaskar Chandavarkar
- Production company: Manoranjan Chitra
- Release date: 1982
- Country: India
- Language: Marathi

Ek Daav Bhutacha is a 1982 Indian Marathi-language horror comedy film directed by Ravi Namade and written by Dattaram Maruti Mirasdar. The film stars Dilip Prabhavalkar, Ashok Saraf, Ranjana, Mohan Kothiwan, Ram Nagarkar, Sulochna and Mohan Joshi. The film's story revolves around A troubled school teacher befriends the ghost of a Maratha soldier, who was cursed by a couple for separating them. In the pursuit of seeking redemption, he helps solve the teacher's problems.

== Plot ==
The plot revolves around a school master, portrayed by Dilip Prabhavalkar. He is a simple and honest teacher who is posted to teach in a school in a small village of rural India. Within a short time he runs into trouble with the village sarpanch (local chief) for having punished his son in class. More trouble soon follows when a dance troupe (or a tamasha) comes into the village. In an effort to please the lead dancer, the sarpanch has the teacher's house emptied and gives it to the dancing troupe to occupy.

Now homeless, the teacher is forced to seek shelter in the ruins of an old building on the outskirts of the village. Here he meets the ghost (or bhoot) of a Maratha soldier, portrayed by Ashok Saraf. Scared at first, the teacher tries to run away. But the ghost soon assures him that he means no harm.

The ghost narrates his story to the teacher. He tells him that he was a soldier in the Maratha army who was cursed for having separated two lovers. Since then, he has waited for a chance to seek redemption. He is convinced that by helping the teacher with his trouble, somehow he may be able to reverse his curse. Not entirely convinced, the teacher agrees all the same.

The ghost first scares the troupe staying in the teacher's house by playing their instruments. Since the teacher is the only one who can see the ghost, the troupe members are terrified and run away. Similar incidents follow that although they embarrass the teacher, but end up solving the teacher's problems. In the course, the teacher meets a village girl, portrayed by Ranjana. The ghost intervenes to make her fall in love with the teacher.

The village sarpanch plays the villain several times, only to be thwarted by the ghost. Finally all ends well when the teacher decides to marry his beloved. Having succeeded in getting two people to fall in love, the ghost is released from his curse and finally gets redemption. The teacher is sorry to see his old friend go. However, the ghost assures him that he will be back, as their child.

== Cast ==
- Dilip Prabhavalkar as Master Sadashiv Sitaram Deshmukh
- Ashok Saraf as Khandoji farzand (Maratha Soldier)
- Ranjana as Durga
- Sulochana as Radha Mavshi
- Mohan Kothiwan
- Ram Nagarkar
- Mohan Joshi
- Raghavendra Kadkol
- Johny Lever

== Soundtrack ==
Ek daav Bhutacha

Soundtrack album by Bhaskar Chandavarkar
- Released: 1982
- Genre: Feature film soundtrack
- Language: Marathi

The music is composed by Bhaskar Chandavarkar. The songs are written by Sudhir Moghe and sung by Anuradha Paudwal, Usha Mangeshkar, Shrikant Padgaonkar. The songs were choreographed by Ranjan Salvi.

=== Track listing ===
No.	Title	Singer(s)
1	"Vishawalli asuni bhavti"	Anuradha Paudwal Shrikant Padgaonkar
2	"Tuch maay baap bandhu"	Shrikant Padgaonkar
3	"Mi phasle ga"	Anuradha Paudwal
4	"Raya mala rang mahalat theva "	Usha Mangeshkar

Anuradha Paudwal won Maharashtra State film award for the best female playback singer.
