= Saaya (Indian TV series) =

Indian television series

- Written by: Vinod Ranganathan; Praveen Raj; Abhiram Bhadkamkar
- Directed by: Sanjay Upadhyay
- Starring: see below
- Country of origin: India
- Original language: Hindi
- No. of seasons: 1
- No. of episodes: 130

Production
- Running time: 24 minutes

Original release
- Network: Sony Entertainment Television
- Release: 1998 – 1999

Saaya (transl. Shadow) is an Indian soap opera aired on Sony TV in 1998. The series was produced by popular production house, UTV Software Communications and revolved around two very different girls – Sudha (Manasi Joshi Roy) and Kamiya (Achint Kaur) who become friends.

== Premise ==
Sudha is a quiet, fragile and an incredibly shy girl who comes from an orthodox family where her father Jagat Narayan has the final say. Kamiya, on the other hand, is bursting with a vibrant zest for life and is an extroverted, confident young girl from a modern family.

Sudha and Kamiya meet in college and become best friends always there to support each other through the rough times until things change between them.

== Cast ==
- Manasi Joshi Roy as Sudha Joshi
- Achint Kaur as Kamiya Mehra
- R. Madhavan as Shekhar Sinha
- Amar Talwar as Mr Mehra, Kamiya's father
- Manju Vyas as Mrs Mehra, Kamiya's mother
- Karan Oberoi (singer) as Karan Mehra, Kamiya's cousin
- Nitesh Pandey as Manoj
- Prakash Ramchandani as Kishore
- Harsh Chhaya as Professor Bhaskar
- Mandeep Bhandar as Bhaskar's wife
- Rajendra Gupta as Jagat Narayan, Sudha's father
- Savita Prabhune as Sharda, Sudha's mother
- Pamela Mukherjee as Renu, Sudha's sister
- Anup Soni as Prakash, Sudha's brother
- Loveleen Mishra as Shalu, Prakash's wife
- Shrivallabh Vyas as Jagannath Sinha, Shekhar's father
- Shreechand Makhija as College Principal
- Lalit Parimoo as Police Inspector Makhija
- Shishir Sharma as Chief Editor Krishnamurthi
- Daya Shankar Pandey as Assistant Editor Pandey
- Rajesh Khera as Ranvir Rastogi
- Varun Vardhan as ad agency owner of Eazyclean washing powder (Episodes 20 to 25)
- Vaquar Shaikh as Arnav Nanda
- Dinesh Kaushik as Sandy, Ranvir Rastogi's promoting partner. (Special Appearance) Episodes No 41 to 45
- Murli Sharma as Malik (Special Appearance Episode 114,115)
