= Bandh Nylonche =

- Directed by: Jatin Satish Wagle
- Screenplay by: Ambar Hadap; Ganesh Pandit; Jatin Wagle
- Story by: Ambar Hadap; Ganesh Pandit; Jatin Wagle
- Produced by: Sunil Chandrika Nair; Siji Nair; Matruka Motion Pictures
- Starring: Mahesh Manjrekar; Subodh Bhave; Shruti Marathe; Sunil Barve; Sanjay Narvekar; Medha Manjrekar; Pranjal Parab
- Edited by: Mohit Takalakar
- Music by: Amitraj
- Release date: 29 January 2016
- Country: India
- Language: Marathi

Bandh Nylonche (Marathi: बंध नायलॉनचे) is a 2016 Marathi language family drama film directed by Jatin Wagle. Presented by Maharashtra Times & Zero Hits and produced by Sunil Chandrika Nair and Siji Nair. Bandh Nylonche features an ensemble cast of Mahesh Manjrekar, Medha Manjrekar, Subodh Bhave, Sunil Barve, Shruti Marathe, Sanjay Narvekar and Pranjal Parab in lead roles. Mahesh Manjrekar and Medha Manjrekar will be acting together for the very first time on a silver screen and that too in a double role. This film is based on an award-winning one-act play by the same name.

Teaser poster of the film was unveiled on 11 November 2015, and Official poster was released on 20 November 2015 which met with very good response. The film released on 29 January 2016.

== Cast ==
- Mahesh Manjrekar as Raghunath Balwant Jogalekar (Appa)
- Medha Manjrekar as Mangal Raghunath Jogalekar
- Subodh Bhave as Devdatta Raghunath Jogalekar
- Sunil Barve as Ravi
- Sanjay Narvekar as Ram Jadhav
- Shruti Marathe as Anita Jogalekar
- Pranjal Parab as Sara Joglekar

== Soundtrack ==
Music for this film is composed by Amitraj while lyrics are penned by Mandar Cholkar.

=== Track listing ===
No.	Title	Singer(s)	Length
1.	"Uthe Kallola Kallola"	Adarsh Shinde	5:18
2.	"Koni Tari"	Avadhoot Gupte	4:03
3.	"Ek Tara"	Aditya Patekar	4:29
Total length:			13:15
