= Khara Kadhi Bolu Naye =

- Theatrical release poster
- Directed by: Ravi Namade
- Written by: N.G Karmarkar
- Produced by: Ravi Namade
- Starring: Sharad Talwalkar; Padma Chavan; Laxmikant Berde; Savita Prabhune
- Music by: Music: Shridhar Phadke; Lyrics: Sudhir Moghe
- Production company: Manoranjan Chitra
- Distributed by: M Ulka Film Distributors
- Release date: 1987
- Country: India
- Language: Marathi

Khara Kadhi Bolu Naye (transl. Never tell the truth) is a 1987 Indian Marathi-language film directed and produced by Ravi Namade under the banner of Manoranjan Chitra. The film stars Laxmikant Berde, Padma Chavan, Sharad Talwalkar, Savita Prabhune.

== Plot ==
The story revolves around a person Mr. Khote (Sharad Talwalkar). Mr. Khote is a successful businessman. But he has cheated many people in business. When two young guys Dilip and his cousin Vijay Laxmikant Berde wish to start a business, Vijay's father (Mr. Khote's best friend) takes them to Mr. Khote. He wants Mr. Khote to teach these young kids about business. At home Mr. Khote has a wife Mrs Saralabai, Saralabai's brother Mama, a daughter Priya and an extra-marital affair with Chanchalabai. Chanchalabai has a daughter Baby from Mr. Khote. Later Vijay falls in love with Priya. But Mr. Khote prefers Dilip as his son-in-law.

When the training starts, Mr. Khote proves Vijay and Dilip cheating is probably the only way to succeed in business. Whereas the young boy Vijay (Laxmikant Berde) is trying to prove that only truth would lead you to success. Mr. Khote also has a close Parasi friend named Pestan. Khote cheats with him several times.

Mr. Khote shows Vijay how to get benefited by cheating others. Many incidences are shown where Mr. Khote proves this fact. But still Vijay is not ready to agree. To prove the sides of Truth and Lie they go for a bet whoever loses would lose 10,000 Rs. Others like Pestan, Dilip join the bet with their own share.

The bet would be for 24 hours and Vijay has promised he won't lie. He is also not allowed to keep mum when someone asks him a question. Story revolves around this and the funny part comes when Mr. Khote's other wife, Pestan's wife visits his house.

== Cast ==
- Laxmikant Berde as Vijay
- Savita Prabhune as Priya Khote
- Sharad Talwalkar as Mr. Khote, Majnu
- Padma Chavan as Mrs. Saralabai Khote
- Deenasha Daji as Pestan Parsi
- Nayantara as Chanchala bai
- Chetan Dalvi as Dilip

== Soundtrack ==
Khara Kadhi Bolu Naye

Soundtrack album by Sridhar Phadke
- Released: 2 February 1989
- Genre: Feature film soundtrack
- Length: 24:57
- Language: Marathi
- Label: Ishtar Music

Track listing
#	Title	Singer(s)	Length
1	"Kuna N Disata Kon Chalvi"	Suresh Wadkar	5:53
2	"Mala Kay Jhale Kalena'"	Suresh Wadkar, Asha Bhosle	5:56
3	"Oth Antur Jhale"	Suresh Wadkar, Asha Bhosale	6:10
4	"Vad Jau Kunala Sharan"	Chandrakant Kale	5:36
