= Janiva =

- Theatrical release poster
- Directed by: Rajesh Ranshinge
- Starring: Satya Manjrekar; Atul Parchure; Kishor Kadam; Vaibhavi Shandilya; Usha Nadkarni; Renuka Shahane
- Cinematography: Shailesh Avasthi
- Edited by: Raju Kapadia
- Music by: Harshwardhan Dixit
- Release date: 31 July 2015
- Country: India
- Language: Marathi

Janiva is a 2015 Indian Marathi-language directed by Rajesh Ranshinge. The film stars Satya Manjrekar, Atul Parchure, Kishor Kadam, Vaibhavi Shandilya, Usha Nadkarni and Renuka Shahane. It was theatrically released on 31 July 2015.

== Cast ==
- Satya Manjrekar
- Atul Parchure
- Kishor Kadam
- Vaibhavi Shandilya
- Usha Nadkarni
- Renuka Shahane
- Sanket Agarwal
- Anuradha Mukherjee
- Devdutt Dani
- Kiran Karmarkar as Milind Deshpande
- Indira Krishnan

== Production ==
Filming

Principal photography began on 11 April 2014 The shoot wrapped up on 6 June 2014.

== Reception ==
Mihir Bhanage from The Times of India wrote "And with all that’s going on, Janiva ends up being a enduring watch. Watch it if you really have to". Saumitra Pote from Maharashtra Times says "This movie has failed on all levels like music, composition, dialogue. Because the overall subject, its scope, its importance has not been thought about as much as it should be".
