= Love Marriage (1984 film) =

- Directed by: Mehul Kumar
- Produced by: Kadar Kashmiri; Jagdish C. Sharma; Ibrahim Surti
- Starring: Anil Kapoor; Meenakshi Sheshadri; Utpal Dutt; Mehmood
- Music by: Songs: Anu Malik; Lyrics: Hasrat Jaipuri
- Release date: 14 December 1984
- Country: India
- Language: Hindi

Love Marriage is a 1984 family-drama Indian Hindi film directed by Mehul Kumar and produced by Kadar Kashmiri, Jagdish C. Sharma and Ibrahim Surti. It starred Anil Kapoor, Meenakshi Sheshadri, Utpal Dutt and Mehmood in lead roles. Music for the film was scored by Anu Malik. which is super hit

== Plot ==
Rajesh Mehra lives a wealthy lifestyle with his mom, Sarita, and dad. His dad finalizes his marriage with Malti, who is the daughter of the equally wealthy, Jagdish Kapoor. When Rajesh is told, he refuses to marry Malti as she is mentally unstable, an argument ensues, and Rajesh angrily leaves. He befriends a poultry farmer, Majid Kaliya, and lives rent-free in a room in his house. Rajesh takes to singing in a nightclub, meets the wealthy Ritu Mafatlal and the two fall in love with each other. Mafatlal wants a rich groom for Ritu, and refuses to permit them to marry, so they elope, get married, and Malti moves in with Rajesh in Majid's room. This does not auger well with Majid's wife, Shabnam, who refuses to permit them to sleep together. Understanding their frustration, Majid gives them two passes to Mysore where they can spend time with each other - the only problem is that the passes are in the names of Kaushal and his sister Kamini Tiwari. Watch what happens when the duo end up at the Srivastav household, run by the Hitler-like Jailor, who had been fired from his job for letting Veeru and Jai (of Sholay) escape from his penitentiary, and are wooed by Murari and Leela Srivastav. Chaos ensues when Kaushal and Kamini decide to make a run with the jailer, and an odd assortment of characters - ranging from goons to black marketeers, giving chase to the hapless honeymooning couple

== Cast ==
- Anil Kapoor as Rajesh Mehra / Kaushal Tiwari (dual role)
- Meenakshi Sheshadri as Ritu Mafatlal
- Mehmood Ali as Majid Kaliya
- Asrani as T.T. Murari Srivastav / Jailor
- Master Bhagwan as Bhang drinker (as Bhagwan Dada)
- C.S. Dubey as Chaubey
- Utpal Dutt as Shankar Singh
- Dinesh Hingoo as Ramarao Raghvendrarao Basu Chatterjee 'Vasu' Gundappa
- Aruna Irani as Leela 'Laila' Srivastav
- Jagdeep as Dudhwala
- Arvind Joshi as Jagdish Kapoor
- Satyendra Kapoor as 'Monty' Mafatlal
- Kanan Kaushal as Sarita Mehra
- Raj Kishore as Fernandes
- Shehnaz Kudia as Shabnam 'Shabu' M. Kaliya
- Anoop Kumar as Chaurangi
- Shreeram Lagoo as Mehra

== Soundtrack ==
Love Marriage

Soundtrack album by Anu Malik
- Released: 1984
- Recorded: 1984
- Genre: Film soundtrack
- Label: HMV

Anu Malik chronology
Sohni Mahiwal (1984)	Love Marriage (1984)	Ram Tera Desh (1984)

No.	Title	Singer(s)	Length
1.	"Murgi Wala Apni Murgian"	Kishore Kumar
2.	"Beeswin Sadi Ke"	Alka Yagnik, Amit Kumar
3.	"O Neeli Chhatri Wale Meri Bhi Araj Ye Sun Le"	Shabbir Kumar, Anuradha Paudwal
4.	"Apna Jeevan Rail Ki Patri, Sath Rahe Or MilNa Paaye"	Anuradha Paudwal, Shabbir Kumar
5.	"Tujhsa Hasin Dekha Nahi, Ee Abba Dabba Dibbi Da"	Vijay Benedict
