= Jaago Mohan Pyare =

Marathi-language comedy series

- Genre: Comedy; Drama
- Directed by: Omkar Dingore
- Starring: See below
- Theme music composer: Rohan-Rohan
- Country of origin: India
- Original language: Marathi
- No. of episodes: 308

Production
- Producers: Vidyadhar Pathare; Manish Dalvi
- Production locations: Mumbai, Maharashtra, India
- Editor: Kishor Ghanekar
- Camera setup: Multi-camera
- Running time: 22 minutes
- Production company: Iris Production

Original release
- Network: Zee Marathi
- Release: 14 August 2017 – 10 November 2018

Related
- Bhago Mohan Pyare

Jaago Mohan Pyare (transl. Wake Up Dear Mohan) is an Indian Marathi language television series which aired on Zee Marathi. It premiered from 14 August 2017 by replacing Dil Dosti Dobara. It is directed by Omkar Dingore and produced by Vidyadhar Pathare under the banner of Iris Production. It starred Atul Parchure, Supriya Pathare and Shruti Marathe in lead roles.

== Plot ==
Mohan Mhatre, a middle-class tailor, is an irritated husband whose dominating wife, Shobha, keeps taunting and harassing him and forces him to do all the housework. Mohan has a habit of helping all the people in the chawl he resides in, although some people sympathize with him while others mock him. Mohan always wishes for someone to be very close to him who could show him some respect and talk to him. One fine day, however, Bhanumati, a fairy, enters Mohan's life to help him with all his difficulties and soon his life takes a magical turn.

== Cast ==
=== Main ===
- Atul Parchure as Mohan Mhatre
- Supriya Pathare as Shobha Mohan Mhatre
- Shruti Marathe as Mohini / Bhanumati

=== Recurring ===
- Usha Naik / Ragini Samant as Leelavati; Shobha's mother
- Maithili Patwardhan as Mau; Little fairy
- Prithvik Pratap as Rahul
- Disha Danade as Anjali; Rahul's wife
- Atharva Sanjay as Manish
- Bhargavi Chirmule as Mohan's employer
- Sandeep Juwatkar as Madan
- Meera Sarang as Madhuri; Madan's wife
- Vandana Marathe as Aaji
- Madhavi Juvekar as Shanta
- Vijay Nikam as Police Inspector

== Reception ==
=== Special episode (1 hour) ===
- 17 September 2017
- 10 November 2018

=== Ratings ===
Week	Year	BARC Viewership		Ref.
Week	Year	TRP	Rank	Ref.
Week 39	2018	3.1	5	
Week 42	2018	3.4	5	
