= Ali Mili Gupchili =

Marathi language child game show

- Genre: Game show Talk show
- Starring: Atul Parchure; Snehalata Vasaikar
- Country of origin: India
- Original language: Marathi
- No. of episodes: 20

Production
- Camera setup: Multi-camera
- Running time: 45 minutes

Original release
- Network: Zee Marathi
- Release: 17 January – 21 March 2020

Ali Mili Gupchili is an Indian Marathi language TV game and talk show which premiered from 17 January 2020 aired on Zee Marathi. The show was hosted by Atul Parchure, Snehalata Vasaikar and Arnav Kalkundri.

== Concept ==
The host interacts with celebrity guests about relationship with their children. Host plays different games with these children in this show.

== Guests ==
- Snehalata Vasaikar
- Swapnil Joshi
- Samidha Guru
