= Tujhi Majhi Love Story =

- Theatrical release poster
- Directed by: Rushikesh More
- Starring: Shruti Marathe; Gaurav Ghatnekar; Sanket More
- Cinematography: Arjun Sorte
- Music by: Bapi – Tutul
- Release date: 20 June 2014
- Country: India
- Language: Marathi

Tujhi Majhi Love Story is a 2014 Indian Marathi-language directed by Rushikesh More. The film stars Shruti Marathe, Gaurav Ghatnekar and Sanket More. It was theatrically released on 20 June 2014.

== Synopsis ==
Indraneel, a young, talented boy, is uncertain about his career. He soon meets Aditi, who recognises his talents and encourages him to pursue his heart, and the two fall in love.

== Cast ==
- Shruti Marathe
- Gaurav Ghatnekar
- Sanket More
- Kalpana Sathe
- Uday Lagu
- Neha Bam
- Mrunalini Jambhale
- Ashok Kulkarni
- Shrikant kamat
- Varad Chavan
- Prashant Neman

== Soundtrack ==
Tujhi Majhi Love Story

Soundtrack album by Bapi – Tutul
- Released: 2014
- Recorded: 2014
- Genre: Feature film soundtrack
- Length: 16:18
- Language: Marathi

Official audio
- Tujhi Majhi Love Story - Full Album on YouTube

The soundtrack of the album was released on 19 May 2014. Tujhi Majhi Love Story songs composed by Bapi – Tutul

No.	Title	Artist(s)	Length
1.	"Sutaleyt Haath"	Rishikesh Kamerkar	3:10
2.	"Me Behka"	Rishikesh Kamerkar	3:08
3.	"Pasrun Jaasi"	Rishikesh Kamerkar	3:10
4.	"Sun Le Jarashi"	Rishikesh Kamerkar	3:14
5.	"Tujhi Majhi Love Story Theme"	Rishikesh Kamerkar	1:44
6.	"Tujhi Majhi Love Story"	Rishikesh Kamerkar	2:32
Total length:			16:18

== Reception ==
=== Critical response ===
A reviewer of Divya Marathi wrote"Technical skills are not used in the film. The cinematography is also not great. Apart from the subject matter and Gaurav's performance, the film has nothing to impress the audience". Shripad Brahme from Maharashtra Times says "Although it was well sung by Hrishikesh Kamerkar and Neha Rajpal, it was not very memorable. In short, this will be recorded as a unique love story in Marathi". A reviewer of Loksatta wrote "In the name of making a simple straightforward film, the hero-heroine is spent the entire time in the mall and the sea. Overall the movie 'Tuji Majhi Love Story' has become just a typical love story". A reviewer of The Times of India wrote "The cinematography and music deserve a special mention as they help you sail through the otherwise average film. A one time watch for the romantics out there".
