= TTMM – Tujha Tu Majha Mi =

- Directed by: Kuldip Jadhav
- Written by: Tejpal Wagh
- Produced by: Santosh Uttam Sawane
- Starring: Lalit Prabhakar; Neha Mahajan; Vidyadhar Joshi; Savita Prabhune
- Cinematography: Mayur Hardas
- Edited by: Mayur Hardas
- Music by: Pankaj Padghan
- Release date: 16 June 2017
- Country: India
- Language: Marathi

TTMM – Tujha Tu Majha Mi is an Indian Marathi language film directed by Kuldip Jadhav. The film stars Lalit Prabhakar, Neha Mahajan, Vidyadhar Joshi and Savita Prabhune. Music by Pankaj Padghan. The film was released on 16 June 2017.

== Synopsis ==
Jay, an enthusiastic traveller, leaves his house to explore different parts of the country. On his way to Goa, he befriends Rajashree, a young woman who has also fled her home.

== Cast ==
- Lalit Prabhakar
- Neha Mahajan
- Vidyadhar Joshi
- Savita Prabhune
- Satish Pulekar
- Seema Deshmukh
- Sagar Karande
- Pushkar Lonarkar
- Sharvari Lohakare
- Pushkaraj Chirputkar
- Bharat Ganeshpure
- Kadambari Kadam in Special Appearance

== Soundtrack ==
TTMM – Tujha Tu Majha Mi

Soundtrack album by Pankaj Padghan
- Released: 2017
- Recorded: 2017
- Genre: Feature film soundtrack
- Length: 20:10
- Language: Marathi

Official audio
- TTMM – Tujha Tu Majha Mi – Full Album on YouTube

Track listing
No.	Title	Singer(s)	Length
1.	"Ye Na"	Sayalie Pankaj	4:19
2.	"TTMM Promotional"	Rupali Moghe	3:20
3.	"Sayyan"	Nandini Srikar	4:54
4.	"Kshan Mohare"	Rohit Raut, Shrinidhi Ghatate	4:23
5.	"Sajiti Gojiri"	Sahil Kulkarni, Rupali Moghe	3:54
Total length:			20:10

== Critical reception ==
TTMM – Tujha Tu Majha Mi film received positive reviews from critics. Blessy Chettiar of Cinestaan.com gave the film 3 stars out of 5 and wrote "TTMM effectively echoes the story of many homes today, where parents and children lock horns over the topic of marriage". Madhura Nerurkar of Loksatta gave the film 2.5 stars out of 5 and wrote "Some of the songs in the movie are good. The feature of this movie is that there is no exaggeration anywhere in the movie. The movie moves forward in a rhythm and ends like that". Ganesh Matkari of Pune Mirror wrote "Despite this, the film is a reasonably feel good experience with decent performances all around. A shorter, and betterpaced script would have resulted in a better product to be sure". Ibrahim Afgan of Maharashtra Times gave the film 3.5 stars out of 5 and wrote "Just because the story revolves around a few major characters doesn't ignore these other threads. It is also taken care of here. So its other oddities, mistakes and faults are to be ignored". Mihir Bhanage of The Times of India gave the film 3 stars out of 5 and wrote "A special mention to cinematographer, Mayur Hardas, who has captured the essence of story through his frames. Overall, TTMM is a fairly good watch".
