= Ravi Namade =

Indian film director

- Died: Pune, Maharashtra, India
- Occupation: Film director
- Years active: 1975–1988
- Known for: Ek Daav Bhutacha

Ravi Namade was an Indian film director known for Ek Daav Bhutacha, for which he received many accolades for best direction, including Maharashtra State Film Award, Baburao Painter Award (second price). Namade also worked as an assistant director for the films Deewar (1975), Trishul (1978), Kaala Patthar (1979), Silsila (1981) with Bollywood film producer and director Yash Chopra.

== Filmography ==
=== Director ===
- Ek Daav Bhutacha (1982)
- Khara Kadhi Bolu Naye (1987)
- Reshimgathi (1988)

=== Assistant director ===
- Deewar (1975)
- Trishul (1978)
- Kaala Patthar (1979)
- Silsila (1981)

== Awards ==
- Maharashtra State Film Award - Best director (Ek Daav Bhutacha)
- Baburao Painter Award - Best director (Ek Daav Bhutacha)

== Death ==
Ravi Namade died in Pune, Maharashtra aged 65.
