= Manasi Joshi Roy =

Indian television actress

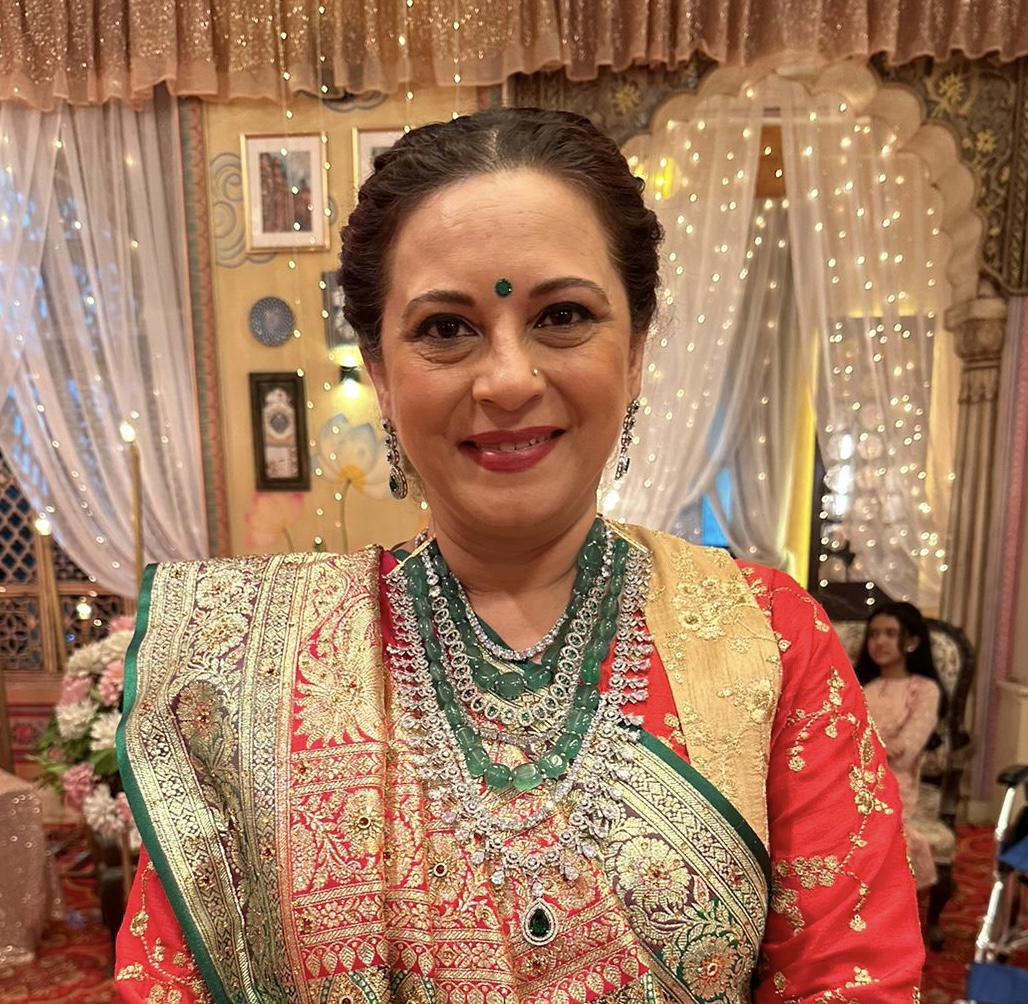
- Roy on the sets of KSMBBHH
- Born: 15 April
- Occupation: Actress
- Spouse: Rohit Roy (m. 1999)
- Children: 1
- Father: Arvind Joshi
- Relatives: Sharman Joshi (brother); Pravin Joshi (uncle); Sarita Joshi (aunt); Purbi Joshi (cousin); Ketki Dave (cousin); Poonam Joshi (cousin); Gulki Joshi (cousin); Ronit Roy (brother-in-law)
- Website: Official Website

Manasi Joshi Roy (née Joshi) is an Indian film and television actress known for her roles in Saaya, Gharwali Uparwali and Kkusum. She is married to Rohit Roy and is the elder sister of actor Sharman Joshi and daughter of Gujarati theatre actor Arvind Joshi.

== Early and personal life ==
Joshi has a bachelor's degree in psychology from Mithibai College (Mumbai). She is the daughter of Gujarati theatre actor, director and producer Arvind Joshi, and actor Sharman Joshi is her brother. Actor Pravin Joshi was her uncle and actress Sarita Joshi is her aunt. Actresses Ketki Dave, Purbi Joshi and Poonam Joshi are her cousins.

Joshi married actor Rohit Roy on 23 June 1999. They have a daughter, Kiara.

== Television ==
Year	Serial	Role	Notes	Ref.
1997	Saturday Suspense – Khauff	Sheela Ramani	Episodic Role	
1998–1999	Saaya	Sudha		
2000–2003	Gharwali Uparwali	Chandni "Uparwali"		
2004–2005	Kkusum	Kusum Deshmukh		
2005	Nach Baliye 1	Contestant	10th place	
2017	Dhhai Kilo Prem	Madhuri Pankaj Sharma		
2022	Yeh Jhuki Jhuki Si Nazar	Sudha Rastogi		
2023–2024	Kyunki Saas Maa Bahu Beti Hoti Hai	Ambika Rajgaur		
2024	The Miranda Brothers	Susan Miranda		
2026–present	Lakshmi Niwas	Lakshmi Jaiswal		
