= Unmatta =

Indian Marathi science fiction movie

- Directed by: Mahesh Rajmane
- Story by: Mahesh Rajmane
- Produced by: Rajendra Khaire, Sahaji Shinde
- Starring: Aarushi Vedikha, Vikas Bangar, Purneima Dey, Prasad Shikhare, Sandeep Shridhar, Sanjay More.
- Edited by: Mahesh Rajmane
- Music by: Yugandhar Deshmukh
- Release date: 22 February 2019
- Country: India
- Language: Marathi

Unmatta is a 2019 Marathi language Indian science fiction supernatural horror film which is written and directed by Mahesh Rajmane. Unmatta is complicated science fiction and exploits many psychological concepts like sleep paralysis, sleep walking, PTSD and bases its premise on Telepathy.

== Plot ==
Aditi (Aarushi Vedikha) is a student of literature, suffering from Post-Traumatic Stress Disorder after being raped as a child and suffers from frequent sleep paralysis. Her best friend, Nuha (Purneima Dey) has lost her mother in river during childhood and constantly suffers from her own nightmares. Siddhartha (Vikas Bangar) is an inquisitive science student, who is experimenting on Telepathy using mind-altering drugs. He persuades his 3 friends Nuha, Chaitanya (Sandeep Shridhar) and Vijay (Prasad Shikhare) to support him in his bizarre initiative. After initial success in his experiment with Nuha, all 4 of them decide to experiment together at a farmhouse. Aditi joins them as a sitter (like a designated driver). But Demon (Sanjay More) from sleep paralysis entices Aditi to also take the drug and join them in telepathic sleep experiment. Sidhartha, Nuha and Chaitanya connect into single telepathic dream, whereas Aditi and Vijay fall into separate dream. Chaitanya finally confesses his love for Nuha in most dramatic way (dream being fulfilling his desire) while resisting from having sex with her (in form of Demon) and sacrifices himself in the dream. But due to his sleep walking illness he commits suicide in real and dies in real world. Nuha goes into her nightmare and tries to save her mom. Meanwhile, Aditi fights with her rapists and Vijay gets to sacrifice his life for her (as per his desire). Once Vijay is dead (in dream) Aditi joins dream of Sidhartha and Nuha. She tries to help Nuha but loses her in the water. Aditi and Siddhartha fight with rapists and Aditi remembers her past and forgives (deletes memories of) the rapists. By now Aditi has taste of telepathic power and she refuses to return from sleep and thus goes into coma. Siddhartha commits suicide in an attempt to burn down his lab. Aditi remains in coma, but she keeps murdering people from within her sleep which look like violent suicides in physical world.

== Cast ==
- Aarushi Vedikha
- Vikas Bangar
- Purneima Dey
- Prasad Shikhare
- Sandeep Shridhar
- Sanjay More
