= Poonam Joshi =

Indian television actress

- Born: Pune, Maharashtra, India
- Occupation: Actress
- Years active: 2001–2012
- Known for: Kahiin To Hoga
- Relatives: Hemant Joshi (Father); Niyati Joshi (Mother); Manasi Joshi Roy (Cousin); Sharman Joshi (Cousin); Purbi Joshi (Cousin); Ketki Dave (Cousin)

Poonam Joshi is an Indian television soap opera actress. She has performed in TV shows such as Bhabhi, Kahaani Ghar Ghar Kii, Kahiin To Hoga, Saat Phere – Saloni Ka Safar. She is a follower of Buddhism.

== Television ==
Year	Serial	Role
2001–2002	Kasautii Zindagii Kay	Jyoti
2003	Kya Hadsaa Kya Haqeeqat	Kusmit, Pragati, Piya
2003–2006	Kahiin To Hoga	Mehak Sinha
2004–2005	Kahaani Ghar Ghar Kii	Chhavi Agarwal
2005	Kkavyanjali	Bindiya
2006	Tumhari Disha	Kamna Dushyant Sehgal
2006–2007	Woh Rehne Waali Mehlon Ki	Sanjana Gupta
2007–2008	Bhabhi	Rishika Thakral / Rishika Samar Kapoor
2007–2008	Saat Phere – Saloni Ka Safar	Dr. Nishi
2009	Mata Ki Chowki	Monica
2010	Kashi – Ab Na Rahe Tera Kagaz Kora	Lakshmi
2012	Sajda Tere Pyaar Mein	
