= Guru Sishyan (2010 film) =

- Directed by: Sakthi Chidambaram
- Written by: Sakthi Chidambaram
- Produced by: Ratha Sakthi Chidamabaram
- Starring: Sathyaraj; Sundar C Sruthi Marathe; Saranya Ponvannan; Santhanam
- Cinematography: K. S. Selvaraj
- Edited by: G. Sasikumar
- Music by: Dhina
- Distributed by: Cinema Paradise
- Release date: 7 May 2010
- Running time: 150 minutes
- Country: India
- Language: Tamil

Guru Sishyan (transl. Teacher, Student) is a 2010 Tamil-language action comedy film directed by Sakthi Chidambaram. It stars Sathyaraj and Sundar C in the lead roles. The title was taken from the 1988 film of the same name.

== Plot ==
Guru (Sathyaraj) is a slimy moneylender in Rajapalayam, whom everybody including his assistants (Raj Kapoor) hates. Eeti (Sundar C) a smart alec soon becomes his constant companion. The pair gang up and virtually take the town over with their boorish and aggressive ways including humiliating Mahalakshmi (Saranya), at any given opportunity.

There is a constant tug of war between Guru and Mahalakshmi who we are told through regular flashbacks were husband and wife who fell out over Guru's sister's suicide. At the interval point it is revealed that Eeti is Mahalakshmi's long lost brother whose mission in life is to unite the estranged couple.

== Cast ==
- Sathyaraj as Guru Moorthy
- Sundar C as Eeti
- Shruti Marathe as Gayathri
- Saranya Ponvannan as Mahalakshmi
- Santhanam as Kaalu
- Raj Kapoor
- Ponnambalam
- Vichu Vishwanath
- Singamuthu
- Aarthi
- Pattimandram Raja
- Shakeela
- Kovai Senthil
- Amarasigamani
- George Vishnu
- Kiran Rathod (Item number)
- Namitha as Anitha (Cameo role)

== Soundtrack ==
Guru Sishyan

Soundtrack album by Dhina
- Released: 28 February 2010
- Recorded: 2010
- Genre: Soundtrack
- Length: 24:28
- Label: Saregama
- Producer: Dhina

Dhina chronology
Kandhakottai (2009)	Guru Sishyan (2010)	Magane En Marumagane (2010)

The music was composed by Dhina and released by Saregama. The song "Ketteley" is a remix of a song by Ilaiyaraaja from the 1976 film Bhadrakali.

Track listing
No.	Title	Lyrics	Singer(s)	Length
1.	"Aandava Andava"	Kabilan	Tippu	5:08
2.	"Kathara Kathara"	Kabilan	Dhina, Bellie Raj, Rita	4:52
3.	"Kettaley Kettaley (Vangona)"	Vaali	Suchitra	4:02
4.	"Aataiyai Podu"	Kabilan	Dhina, Girish, Rita	5:14
5.	"Subaiya Subaiya"	Kabilan	Sathyaraj, Sundar C	5:12
Total length:				24:28

== Reception ==
Sify wrote "Strictly for those who love double entendre, crude comedy, skin show and item numbers, flying kicks and have more than two and a half hours to spare". Rediff wrote "The problem is, there's nothing in the least respectable about the movie. You can enjoy a well-paced potpourri that at least tries to entertain everyone, but there's little to the credit of a film that seriously tests the boundaries of vulgarity and makes you squirm in your seat with embarrassment".
