= Radha Hi Bawari =

Indian soap opera

- Genre: Indian soap opera Drama; Romance
- Written by: Viren Pradhan
- Directed by: Viren Pradhan
- Starring: See below
- Country of origin: India
- Original language: Marathi
- No. of episodes: 382

Production
- Producers: Rigvedi Viren; Swanand Joshi
- Production locations: Mumbai, Maharashtra
- Camera setup: Multi-camera
- Running time: 22 minutes
- Production company: Picolo Films

Original release
- Network: Zee Marathi
- Release: 24 December 2012 – 1 March 2014

Radha Hi Bawari is an Indian Marathi language romantic drama series which aired on Zee Marathi. It starred Shruti Marathe and Saurabh Gokhale in lead roles and Kavita Lad, Ila Bhate and Sharad Ponkshe in pivotal roles. It was premiered on 24 December 2012 and ended on 1 March 2014 completing 382 episodes. The series replaced Dilya Ghari Tu Sukhi Raha.

== Summary ==
Radha, an independent, self-reliant woman, is taken by surprise when she 'experiences love in its most purest and sincere form'. She is a self made gynaecologist and has a fledgling career.

== Cast ==
- Shruti Marathe as Radha Saurabh Dharmadhikari
- Saurabh Gokhale as Saurabh Madhukar Dharmadhikari
- Kavita Lad as Seema Madhukar Dharmadhikari
- Sharad Ponkshe as Madhukar Dharmadhikari
- Ila Bhate as Dr. Sai Pradhan, Radha's guardian
- Amol Bawdekar as Kedar Madhukar Dharmadhikari
- Tushar Dalvi as Markand Madhukar Dharmadhikari
- Sunil Barve as Gautam Shrungarpure
- Ashwini Ekbote as Sarita Manohar
- Adwait Dadarkar as Victor D'costa
- Mrunal Jadhav as Jui D'costa, Victor's daughter

== Awards ==
Zee Marathi Utsav Natyancha Awards 2013
Category	Role	Recipient
Best Character Female	Seema	Kavita Medhekar
Best Father-in-law	Madhukar	Sharad Ponkshe
Best Title Song	Music Composer	Nilesh Moharir
