= Kavita Lad =

Indian television, theatre and film actress

- Born: Kavita Lad; 13 November 1973 (age 53); Mumbai, Maharashtra
- Occupation: Actress
- Years active: 1993-present
- Spouse: Ashish Medhekar (m. 2003)
- Children: 1

Kavita Lad-Medhekar is an Indian actress, known for her work in Marathi Theatre, Television and Films. She is best known for her daily soap opera roles in Char Divas Sasuche, Unch Majha Zoka, Radha Hi Bawari, Radha Prem Rangi Rangli, Tula Shikvin Changlach Dhada and also for her theatre performances in Sundar Mi Honar, Eka Lagnachi Goshta, Char Divas Premache and Eka Lagnachi Pudhchi Goshta.

== Career ==
Kavita Lad first made her first appearance onscreen in N. Chandras Marathi film Ghayaal opposite Ajinkya Deo. She later appeared in films like Jigar opposite Laxmikant Berde, Tu Tithe Mee with Prashant Damle which won the National Award, Lapun Chapun, Anolkhi Hey Ghar Maze, Sukhant, Urfi, Asehi Ekada Vhave.

Lad made her Marathi theatre debut with Sundar Mi Honar starring Dr. Sriram Lagoo and Vandana Gupte. Her pairing with Prashant Damle in plays like Char Divas Premache, Eka Lagnachi Goshta, Mazhiya Bhaujinna Reet Kalena and recently released 2018 sequel Eka Lagnachi Pudhchi Goshta has been praised by audience and is the only evergreen hit duo in the Marathi theatre industry with maximum hit plays .

Been working in the Marathi Television industry for two decades, her notable work includes Char Divas Sasuche with Rohini Hattangadi, Kay Pahilas Mazyat, Dar Uagada Na Gade, Unch Majha Zoka, Radha Hi Bawari, Tumcha Amcha Same Asta, Tuzya Vachun Karmena, Radha Prem Rangi Rangli etc.

She made her Hindi Television debut in Chandrakant Chiplunkar Seedi Bambawala with Prashant Damle in 2014.

As of 2019, Lad will be seen in Love You Zindagi, a comedy drama film opposite Sachin Pilgaonkar and coming of age comedy film titled Girlfriend with Amey Wagh, Sai Tamhankar.

She also starred in Anant Mahadevan directorial Doctor Rakhmabai as Jayantibai with Prasad Oak and Tannishtha Chatterjee.

== Filmography ==
=== Films ===
Year	Title	Role	Notes
1993	Ghayaal	Sangeeta Mandke	Debut Film
1995	Chal Kanvariya Shiv Ke Dham	Rajkumari Parvati	
1998	Jigar	Lucy Pascal / Lata Pawaskar	
1998	Tu Tithe Mee	Kavita	National Film Award for Best Feature Film in Marathi
2006	Lapun Chapun		
2008	Anolkhi Hey Ghar Maze	Shubada Deshmukh	
2009	Sukhant	Vina Gunje	
2015	Urfi	Amruta's mother	
2016	Doctor Rakhmabai	Jayantibai	
2018	Asehi Ekada Vhave	Renuka Paranjape	
2019	Love You Zindagi	Nalu	
2019	Girlfriend	Nachiket's mother	
2024	Nach Ga Ghuma	Herself	
2026	Aadi Anant	Suman	

=== Theatre ===
Year	Title	Role	Ref.
1996	Sundar Mi Honar	Sanjay's wife	
1996	Char Divas Premache		
1997	Shhh... Kuthe Bolaycha Nahi		
1998	Eka Lagnachi Goshta	Manisha	
2012	Maziya Bhaujina Reet Kalena		
2018-present	Eka Lagnachi Pudhchi Goshta	Manisha	

=== Television ===
Year	Title	Role	Ref.
2000	Comedy Dot Com	Sakhu	
2000	Kay Pahilas Mazyat		
2001-2012	Char Divas Sasuche	Anuradha Deshmukh	
2006-2012	Mejwani Paripoorna Kitchen	Host	
2007	Dar Ughada Na Gade	Episodic Role	
2008	Jodi Jamli Re	Host	
2012-2013	Unch Majha Zoka	Umabai Kurlekar	
2012-2014	Radha Hi Bawari	Seema Dharamadhikari	
2014-2015	Chandrakant Chiplunkar Seedi Bambawala	Hemali Chiplunkar	
2015-2016	Tumcha Aamcha Same Asta	Ishan's mother	
2016-2017	Tujhya Vachun Karmena	Siddharth's mother	
2017-2019	Radha Prem Rangi Rangli	Madhuri Paranjape	
2023-2025	Tula Shikvin Changlach Dhada	Bhuvaneshwari / Charulata	
