= Shruti Marathe =

Indian film and television actress

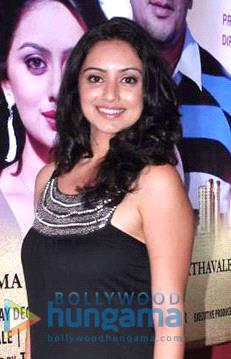
- Marathe in 2013
- Born: Shruti Marathe; 9 October 1986 (age 40); Vadodara, Gujarat, India
- Citizenship: Indian
- Education: St. Mira's College
- Occupations: Model; Actress
- Years active: 2008 – present
- Spouse: Gaurav Ghatnekar (m. 2016)

Shruti Marathe (born 9 October 1986) is an Indian actress known for her works in Marathi and Tamil films and television.

== Personal life ==
Shruti married actor Gaurav Ghatnekar in 2016. She sometimes goes by the name Shruti Prakash or Hema Malini while acting in South Indian films. In 2012, she decided to take a break from acting in Tamil films and decided to act full-time in Marathi industry as she found it difficult to act in those films due to lack of fluency in Tamil language and Marathi being her mother tongue. She had hired a tutor to teach her Tamil not for learning for scenes' dialogues but to interact with people and staff on sets.

In 2019, Shruti revealed that she was trolled on social media when she just entered the Marathi film industry but this trolling turned into appreciation. While shooting for the Tamil film Guru Sishyan in 2010, she had worn a bikini for the song "Kathara Kathara" in that film. The film had received negative reviews and did poorly but was mainly remembered for that bikini scene in that song. She mentioned that she was asked to wear one and she readily agreed and said that she hadn't even considered questions like how was it going to be shot or whether it was required or not, as all that mattered to her was the opportunity to be part of that film. The fact that she had worked in a Tamil film and worn a bikini had gone under the radar as according to her back then South Indian films didn't make much news outside of those states as compared to today where accessibility to news about South Indian films is easy thanks to social media, OTT platforms and theaters. However, when she did her first Marathi daily soap Radha Hi Bawari in 2012 and gained fame in many households, many people out of curiosity started searching about her on the Internet with the first photo showing up of her in a bikini in a pool from one of those still photos of that film. Right after the first episode of the serial, she was heavily trolled on social media for those photos and the scene especially for the way it was shot. She was even bodyshamed for her weight in the beginning but she kept working as if that incident didn't bother her even though she was objectified on social media. Later on as the serial went on, she began to receive appreciation and love for her acting.

She is also a member of a Nashik Dhol pathak (squad) named Kalavanta Dhol Tasha Pathak in Pune since 10 years. Every Ganpati festival, she goes there to participate in the visarjan (immersion) procession religiously. Her photos of her playing the dhol had become famous in 2022 and a year later she revealed that due to those photos she bagged a role in the 2024 Telugu-language film Devara: Part 1 thus making her Tollywood debut. Koratala Siva later explained that he chose her because he didn't want an actress to look like a second heroine in the film. He further added that he had been searching for an actress who complemented Devara's personality. He then clarified that if he had cast any reputed actor then perhaps their image would have sidelined the role.

== Career ==
She made her film debut with the Marathi film Sanai Choughade (2008). At this point, Shruti was acting in theatre drama as well. Later, on the recommendation of a photographer in Pune, she got her first break in Tamil film industry where she starred in her first film named Indira Vizha (2009) which was a remake of a Bollywood film Aitraaz. Her second Tamil was Naan Avanillai 2 (2009), and then she starred in the film Guru Sishyan (2010). After making a special appearance in the Tamil film Aravaan (2012) she decided to act full time in Marathi film industry where she did her first daily television soap in Marathi called Radha Hi Bawari in 2012 which then made her a household name and garnered her huge success. She acted in known Marathi films like Rama Madhav (2014), Taptapadi (2014),Bandh Nylon Che (2016) and Mumbai-Pune-Mumbai 2 (2015). She even did two Bollywood films - Budhia Singh – Born to Run in 2016 and Wedding Anniversary in 2017. Regarding her role in Rama Madhav, a critic stated that "as Parvatibai, Shruti Marathe brings out the perfect pathos as a woman waiting for her dead husband to return from war". In a review of Budhia Singh – Born to Run, a critic noted that "But the surprise package is Shruti Marathe as Biranchi's wife Gita. She holds her stead against Manoj with fair gusto. She smoothly conveys the poignant turmoil of a wife and mother". She made her Kannada film debut with Aadu Aata Aadu in 2017, which was a remake of Thiruttu Payale (2006). She made a special appearance in a Tamil film Naanga Romba Busy in 2020 which was released on television in November that year. In 2022, she made a cameo appearance in the Marathi film Dharmaveer which was based on the life of a Thane-based Shiv Sena leader Anand Dighe. In the same year she starred as Soyrabai in the period-drama film Sarsenapati Hambirrao which was released on 27 May 2022. In 2024, Shruti made her Tollywood film debut in the movie Devara: Part 1 where she acted alongside Jr. NTR, Saif Ali Khan and Janhavi Kapoor. The film released on 27 September 2024 and was directed by Koratala Siva.

== Filmography ==
=== Films ===
Year	Title	Role	Language	Notes
2008	Sanai Choughade	Ashwini	Marathi	
2009	Indira Vizha	Savithri Duraisimaalu	Tamil	Credited as Hema Malini
2009	Naan Avanillai 2	Saki	Tamil	
2009	Asa Mi Tasa Mi	Namita	Marathi	
2009	Lagali Paij	Deepali Kelkar	Marathi	
2010	Guru Sishyan	Gayathri	Tamil	
2011	Teecha Baap Tyacha Baap	Canada Pai	Marathi	
2012	Aravaan	Kanaganuga	Tamil	Special appearance
2012	Satya, Savitree Ani Satyawan	Surpriya Jadhav	Marathi	
2013	Premasutra	Malavika	Marathi	
2013	Tujhi Majhi Love Story	Aditi	Marathi	
2014	Rama Madhav	Parvtibai Peshwe	Marathi	
2014	Taptapadi	Sunanda	Marathi	
2015	Mumbai-Pune-Mumbai 2	Tanuja	Marathi	
2016	Bandh Nylon Che	Anita Jogalekar	Marathi	
2016	Budhia Singh – Born to Run	Gita	Hindi	
2017	Wedding Anniversary	Basanti	Hindi	
2017	Aadu Aata Aadu	Shruti	Kannada	Credited as Shruti Prakash
2020	Naanga Romba Busy	Sangeetha	Tamil	Television film
2022	Dharmaveer	Tanvi Mahapatra	Marathi	Cameo appearance
2022	Sarsenapati Hambirrao	Soyarabai	Marathi	Nominated–Zee Chitra Gaurav Puraskar for Best Supporting Actress
2024	Alibaba Aani Chalishitale Chor	Aditi	Marathi	
2024	Munjya	Gotya's mother	Hindi	
2024	Devara: Part 1	Devara's wife and Vara's mother	Telugu	
2024	Gulaabi	Riya Deshmukh	Marathi	

=== Television ===
Year	Title	Role	Language	Ref.
2003	Peshwai	Ramabai Peshwa	Marathi	
2012–2014	Radha Hi Bawari	Radha Dharmadhikari	Marathi	
2017–2018	Jaago Mohan Pyare	Gennie (Bhanumati)	Marathi	
2019	Flip	Radhika	Hindi	
2021	Majhya Navaryachi Bayko	Gurunath's Girlfriend (Cameo appearance)	Marathi	
2021	Rudrakaal	Smita Thakur	Hindi	
2021	Bard of Blood	Neeta	Hindi	
2022	Bus Bai Bas	Guest	Marathi	
2026	Pritam and Pedro	Shraddha Sardesai	Hindi	

=== Theatre ===
- Sant Sakhu
- Lagnabambal
