= Waman Kendre =

Indian theatre director and academic

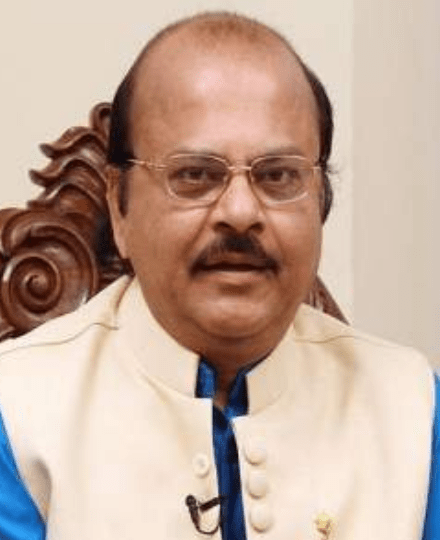
- Born: Daradwadi, Beed district, Maharashtra
- Education: National School of Drama, Delhi
- Occupations: Theatre director and academicain
- Years active: 1970 – present
- Known for: Director of NSD, Delhi
- Spouse: Gauri Kendre
- Honours: Padma Shri (2019)

Waman Kendre is an Indian theatre director and academic. He has previously served as the Director of National School of Drama, (NSD) New Delhi from August 2013 to September 2018. He is married to actress Gauri Kendre and also has a son.

== Early years ==
He is the son of a farmer from Daradwadi village in Beed district of the Indian state of Maharashtra.

After his school and college, he completed a one-year proficiency certification course in Dramatics from Dr. Babasaheb Ambedkar Marathwada University, Aurangabad and then was selected for a three-year course in the NSD.

== Career ==
At NSD, he earned a fellowship to research on ritualistic and folk theatre of Kerala. He remained active in theatre activities in Mumbai for many years. He is credited with playing a leading role in the Dalit theatre movement in late 1970s Maharashtra.

Kendre had a thirty-year teaching experience. He conducted more than two hundred and fifty workshops on varying aspects of theatre, in India and abroad. He was a Research Associate with the Theatre Development Centre, National Centre for the Performing Arts, Mumbai, for more than nine years. He was actively involved in administrative and organizational running of NCPA, University of Mumbai, and Rangpeeth, Mumbai.

He held positions in advisory committees and governing councils including Vision Plan Committee of NSD, Rajya Marathi Vikas Sanstha of the government of Maharashatra), Advisory Committee of the Department of Drama in Rajasthan University, Jaipur, Governing Council and Executive Committee of West Zonal Cultural Centre, Udaipur, Academic Council of University of Mumbai, Vision Plan Committee of Government of Goa, Advisory Committee for All India Radio and Doordarshan and Society of Governing Council of Satyajit Ray Film and Television Institute.

He adapted Sanskrit playwright Bhāsa's Madhyama Vyāyoga in three different languages: O My Love in English, Mohe Piya in Hindi and Piya Bawari in Marathi.

Other notable productions include Zulwa, Jannemann, Tempt Me Not, Nati Goti, Gadhe Ki Baraat, Ladi Nazariya, Ranangan, Dusra Samana, Saiyyan Bhaye Kotwal, Ghazab Teri Ada, Laagi Lagan, Char Divas Premache and Rajdarshan. Gajab Tichi Adaa (Marathi Natak)

== Recognition ==
He has been repeatedly honoured for his contribution to theatre including a National Award conferred by the President of India for Theatre Direction in a recognition by the Sangeet Natak Akademi in 2012.

In 2019, he received the Padma Shri award, the fourth highest civilian award in India.

In 2020-2021 he received National Kalidas Samman award from madhya Pradesh government.

== See also ==
- Theatre in India
