= List of accolades received by Vishwaroopam =

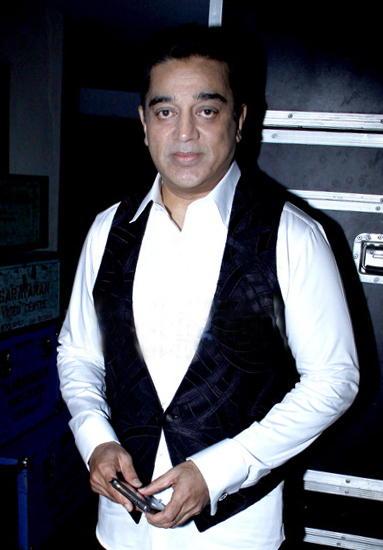
- Kamal Haasan (pictured in 2014) received several awards and nominations for producing, directing and acting in the film.
Accolades
Award	Won	Nominated
Ananda Vikatan Cinema Awards	4	4
Filmfare Awards South	0	3
Jagran Film Festival	2	2
National Film Awards	2	2
South Indian International Movie Awards	0	7
Tamil Nadu State Film Awards	2	2
Vijay Awards	3	16
- Total number of awards and nominations (Note: Awards in certain categories do not have prior nominations and only winners are announced by the jury. For simplification and to avoid errors, each award in this list has been presumed to have had a prior nomination.)
Totals	13	36
- References

Vishwaroopam is a 2013 Indian spy thriller film directed by Kamal Haasan. Besides starring in the lead role with Pooja Kumar, Haasan co-produced the film with S. Chandrahaasan and Prasad V. Potluri, and co-wrote the script with Atul Tiwari. Andrea Jeremiah, Rahul Bose, Shekhar Kapur and Nassar play supporting roles in the film. The film's story revolves around Wisam Ahmed Kashmiri, a spy from India's intelligence agency Research and Analysis Wing, stopping a group of Al-Qaeda terrorists led by Omar (Bose) from triggering a dirty bomb made by scraping caesium from oncological equipment in New York City. A bilingual film, made in Tamil and Hindi (as Vishwaroop), the soundtrack and score were composed by Shankar–Ehsaan–Loy. Sanu Varghese and Mahesh Narayanan were in charge of the film's cinematography and editing respectively. Lalgudi N. Ilaiyaraaja and Boontawee 'Thor' Taweepasas were in charge of art direction while Birju Maharaj handled the choreography.

Vishwaroopam was made on a budget of ₹950 million. (Note: The average exchange rate in 2013 was 60.936 Indian rupees (₹) per 1 US dollar (US$).) The film was released on 25 January 2013 worldwide except Tamil Nadu where it was banned due to protest by Islamic organisations which cited that Muslims were depicted in a negative manner. The ban on the film was lifted and it released on 7 February 2013 after a mutual agreement between Haasan and the organisations; the Hindi version was released on 1 February 2013. Both versions received generally positive reviews and were commercial successes at the box office, collectively grossing ₹2.2 billion overall.

The film won 13 awards from 36 nominations; its direction, performances of the cast members, music, cinematography, editing, art direction and choreography have received the most attention from award groups. At the 60th National Film Awards, Vishwaroopam won the Best Choreography and Best Production Design. It received three nominations: Best Film, Best Director and Best Actor at the 61st Filmfare Awards South, winning none. The film won three awards from sixteen nominations at the 8th Vijay Awards, including Best Film (Kamal, S. Chandrahaasan, Potluri), Best Supporting Actress (Jeremiah), and Best Villain (Bose); Kamal won the Best Actor and Favourite Director, while Ilayaraaja and Taweepasas received the award for Best Art Director. Vishwaroopam received seven nominations at the 3rd South Indian International Movie Awards. Among other wins, the film received four Ananda Vikatan Cinema Awards, two Tamil Nadu State Film Awards and two awards at the Jagran Film Festival.

== Accolades ==
Award	Date of ceremony (Note: Date is linked to the article about the awards held that year, wherever possible.)	Category	Nominee(s)	Result	Ref.
Ananda Vikatan Cinema Awards	8 January 2014	Best Art Direction	Lalgudi N. Ilaiyaraaja, Boontawee 'Thor' Taweepasas	Won	
Ananda Vikatan Cinema Awards	8 January 2014	Best Makeup Artist	Gage Hubard, Ralis Khan	Won	
Ananda Vikatan Cinema Awards	8 January 2014	Best Choreographer	Birju Maharaj for "Unnai Kanadhu"	Won	
Ananda Vikatan Cinema Awards	8 January 2014	Best Stunt Director	Kecha Khamphakdee, Lee Whittaker, Parvez Feroz, T. Ramesh	Won	
Filmfare Awards South	12 July 2014	Best Film – Tamil	Kamal Haasan, S. Chandrahaasan, Prasad V. Potluri	Nominated	
Filmfare Awards South	12 July 2014	Best Director – Tamil	Kamal Haasan	Nominated	
Filmfare Awards South	12 July 2014	Best Actor – Tamil	Kamal Haasan	Nominated	
Jagran Film Festival	24–29 September 2013	Best Editor	Mahesh Narayanan	Won	
Jagran Film Festival	24–29 September 2013	Special Jury Award	Kamal Haasan	Won	
National Film Awards	3 May 2013	Best Production Design	Lalgudi N. Ilayaraaja, Boontawee 'Thor' Taweepasas	Won	
National Film Awards	3 May 2013	Best Choreography	Birju Maharaj for "Unnai Kanadhu"	Won	
South Indian International Movie Awards	12–13 September 2014	Best Film – Tamil	Kamal Haasan, S. Chandrahaasan, Prasad V. Potluri	Nominated	
South Indian International Movie Awards	12–13 September 2014	Best Director – Tamil	Kamal Haasan	Nominated	
South Indian International Movie Awards	12–13 September 2014	Best Cinematographer – Tamil	Sanu Varghese	Nominated	
South Indian International Movie Awards	12–13 September 2014	Best Actor – Tamil	Kamal Haasan	Nominated	
South Indian International Movie Awards	12–13 September 2014	Best Actor in a Negative Role – Tamil	Rahul Bose	Nominated	
South Indian International Movie Awards	12–13 September 2014	Best Stunt Choreographer – Tamil	Lee Whittaker	Nominated	
South Indian International Movie Awards	12–13 September 2014	Best Dance Choreographer – Tamil	Birju Maharaj for "Unnai Kanadhu"	Nominated	
Tamil Nadu State Film Awards	13 July 2017	Best Choreographer	Birju Maharaj for "Unnai Kanadhu"	Won	
Tamil Nadu State Film Awards	13 July 2017	Best Costume Designer	Gautami	Won	
Vijay Awards	5 July 2014	Best Director	Kamal Haasan	Nominated	
Vijay Awards	5 July 2014	Best Actor	Kamal Haasan	Won	
Vijay Awards	5 July 2014	Best Supporting Actress	Andrea Jeremiah	Nominated	
Vijay Awards	5 July 2014	Best Villain	Rahul Bose	Nominated	
Vijay Awards	5 July 2014	Best Cinematographer	Sanu Varghese	Nominated	
Vijay Awards	5 July 2014	Best Art Director	Lalgudi N. Ilayaraaja, Boontawee 'Thor' Taweepasas	Won	
Vijay Awards	5 July 2014	Best Editor	Mahesh Narayanan	Nominated	
Vijay Awards	5 July 2014	Best Male Playback Singer	Shankar Mahadevan, Kamal Haasan for "Unnai Kanadhu"	Nominated	
Vijay Awards	5 July 2014	Best Background Score	Tubby-Parik	Nominated	
Vijay Awards	5 July 2014	Best Stunt Director	Kecha Khamphakdee, Lee Whittaker, Parvez Feroz, T. Ramesh	Nominated	
Vijay Awards	5 July 2014	Best Choreographer	Birju Maharaj for "Unnai Kanadhu"	Nominated	
Vijay Awards	5 July 2014	Best Make Up Artistes	Gage Hubard, Ralis Khan	Nominated	
Vijay Awards	5 July 2014	Best Costume Designer	Gautami	Nominated	
Vijay Awards	5 July 2014	Favourite Film	Kamal Haasan, S. Chandrahaasan, Prasad V. Potluri	Nominated	
Vijay Awards	5 July 2014	Favourite Hero	Kamal Haasan	Nominated	
Vijay Awards	5 July 2014	Favourite Director	Kamal Haasan	Won	

== See also ==
- List of Tamil films of 2013
