= Vishwaroopam (disambiguation) =

Vishwaroopam is a 2013 Indian espionage action thriller film by Kamal Haasan.

Vishwaroopam may also refer to:

- Vishwaroopam (soundtrack), soundtrack to the 2013 Indian film
- Vishwaroopam II, a 2018 Indian film by Kamal Haasan, seuquel to the 2013 film
- Vishwaroopam (1978 film), an Indian Malayalam-language film by P. V. Narayanan and T. K. Vasudevan
- Vishwaroopam (1980 film), an Indian Tamil-language film by A. C. Tirulokchandar
- Viswaroopam (1981 film), an Indian Telugu-language philosophical film

== See also ==
- Vishvarupa (disambiguation)
- Controversies related to Vishwaroopam, controversies related to the 2013 Indian film
