= George Vishnu =

Indian actor

- Born: Murali Raj Sathish; India
- Other name: George
- Occupation: Actor
- Years active: 1997-present
- Spouse: Smitha (m. 1999)
- Children: 2
- Parents: Ravichandran; Sheela

George Vishnu is an Indian actor who has worked on Tamil-language films and in television dramas.

== Career ==
George Vishnu, the son of Malaysian Tamil actor Ravichandran and Malayalam actress Sheela, was chosen by producer Bhaskar to debut in a film titled Kadhal Rojavae in 1997. According to the deal signed, he was not supposed to act in any other film until Kadhal Rojavae had been completed and released. However, during production, Vishnu could not wait and starred in a Malayalam film, while Director Keyaar was still shooting, causing a rift between the actor and producer Bhaskar during the making of the project. The film, which featured him alongside Pooja Kumar, subsequently had a release after a delay in production in 2000.

The failure of the film meant that he instead chose to portray characters in television serials, and appeared intermittently in Tamil films with Sundar C include Guru Sishyan (2010), Nagaram (2010), Theeya Velai Seiyyanum Kumaru (2013) and Muthina Kathirika (2016).

== Filmography ==
Year	Film	Role	Language	Notes
1997	Five Star Hospital	Rafael	Malayalam	
1998	Manthri Maalikayil Manasammatham	Sreekumar	Malayalam	
2000	Kadhal Rojavae	Vishnu	Tamil	
2009	Malayali	Ganesh	Malayalam	
2010	Thunichal	Shiva's elder brother	Tamil	
2010	Guru Sishyan	Himself	Tamil	Special appearances
2010	Saroja	Himself	Tamil	Special appearances
2010	Nagaram	Dhamu	Tamil	
2012	Adhisaya Ulagam	Hariraman	Tamil	credited as George Antony
2013	Theeya Velai Seiyyanum Kumaru	Raghavendra Rao	Tamil	
2013	Ya Ya	Sehwag's assistant	Tamil	
2015	Yennai Arindhaal	Thenmozhi's father	Tamil	
2016	Azhagu Kutti Chellam	Brahmin	Tamil	
2016	Muthina Kathirika	Muthupandi's brother	Tamil	
2021	Parris Jeyaraj	Jeyaraj's uncle	Tamil	

=== Serials ===
- 2000-2003 Veetuku Veedu Looty (Jaya TV)
- 2003-2004 Sahana as Akash (Jaya TV)
- 2003-2005 Roja as Pugazhmani (Jaya TV)
- 2005 Selvi as Vijay (Sun TV)
- 2005-2006 Malargal as Moorthy (Sun TV)
- 2007 Megala (Sun TV)
- 2008 Boys vs Girls (Star Vijay)
- 2009-2010 Chellamay (Sun TV)
- 2016 Vinnaithaandi Varuvaayaa (Star Vijay)
- 2023 Geethanjali (Gemini TV)
- 2024–2026 Manamagale Vaa as Rajasingam (Sun TV)
