= Flavors (film) =

Romantic-comedy film

- Directed by: Raj and DK
- Written by: Raj and DK
- Produced by: Anupam Mittal; Raj and DK
- Starring: Anjan Srivastav; Bharati Achrekar; Pooja Kumar; Reef Karim; Rishma Malik; Anupam Mittal; Jicky Schnee; Sireesha Katragadd
- Cinematography: David Isern
- Edited by: Frank Reynolds
- Music by: Songs: Lesle Lewis; Score: Mahesh Shankar
- Release dates: 30 October 2003 (Milan International Film Festival); 16 July 2004 (United States)
- Running time: 118 minutes
- Country: United States
- Languages: English; Hindi; Telugu

Flavors is a 2003 romantic comedy film written and directed by Raj Nidimoru and Krishna D.K., concerning Indian immigrants in America.

== Plot ==
Flavors tells the stories of 13 different main characters in four parallel story lines.

The marriage of NRI Rad to his American fiancée Jenni brings his parents to the US where they quickly adapt to American ways.

Meanwhile, Kartik tries to maintain a long-distance relationship with his friend Rachna while her aunt tries to set her up with a well educated man Ramana.

A bored housewife Sangita is neglected by her workaholic husband Nikhil. She calls her mother and spends her time doing household chores. Unbeknownst to her, Sangita's husband lost her job and been laid off a while back but was too embarrassed to tell her.

Candy has to deal with her roommates Vivek, Ashok and Jas. Vivek who is depressed after he lost his job and learns that his lover from India, Gita, has already got married with someone else.

How all these characters convene at Rad and Jenni's marriage form the rest of the story.

== Cast ==
- Anjan Srivastav as Mr. Gopalakrishna
- Bharati Achrekar as Mrs. Gopalakrishna
- Pooja Kumar as Rachana
- Reef Karim as Kartik
- Rishma Malik as Candy
- Anupam Mittal as Rad
- Jicky Schnee as Jenni
- Sireesha Katragadda as Sangita
- Gaurang Vyas as Nikhil
- Mohit Shah as Vivek
- Punit Jasuja as Ashok
- Gaurav Rawal as Jas
- Manan Katohara as Ramana Dasarakothapalli
- Tushar Unadkat as Randy Sandy
- Gayatri Khanna as Smita
- Sangeet Sharma as Rachana's aunt

The directors Raj and DK play stars on the make believe soap opera Love Pyar Etc.

== Soundtrack ==
Track listing
No.	Title	Lyrics	Music	Singer(s)	Length
1.	"Carefree Citizen"	In Limbo	In Limbo	In Limbo
2.	"Hum Tum"	Sita Menon	Mahesh Shankar	Bonnie Chakraborty, Tanvi Shah
3.	"Bangin'"		Omar Alexander	Omar Alexander
4.	"Desi Style"		Style Bhai	Style Bhai
5.	"At Home"		Mahesh Shankar	Anita Chandrashekharan
6.	"Sunshine"		In Limbo
7.	"Love Pyar Etc"	Sita Menon	Mahesh Shankar	Raj Nidimoru, Tanvi Shah
8.	"Sa Ni Da Pa" (from Colonial Cousins)			Colonial Cousins
9.	"Dekha Tumhe"		Sandeep Acharya, Vishal Oberoi	Sandeep Acharya, Vishal Oberoi
10.	"Front To Back"	Sita Menon	Omar Alexander	Omar Alexander
11.	"Nagamomu"		Mahesh Shankar	Shobha Raju
12.	"Day Out"	Sita Menon	Mahesh Shankar	John Alevizakis, Renoo
13.	"On The Floor"		G. 'Debonair' Patnaik, Sid 'Draztik'	G. 'Debonair' Patnaik, Sid 'Draztik'
14.	"October To December"		Omar Alexander	Omar Alexander
15.	"Dance For Life"		Wolfgang 'Ikarus' Stindl, Sandhya Sanjana	Sandhya Sanjana
16.	"Life Like It Is"	Sita Menon	Leslee Lewis	Leslee Lewis
17.	"Connections"	Sita Menon	Leslee Lewis	Leslie Lewis, Aruna Thyagarajan

== Release ==
Flavors was an official selection at the Cairo International Film Festival, the Hamptons International Film Festival, the Milan Film Festival, the Hawaii International Film Festival, the Bangkok International Film Festival, the San Francisco International Film Festival, the Asian American International Film Festival and the Mumbai Film Festival.

=== Reception ===
==== Critical reception ====
Flavors received mostly positive reviews form critics. Vivek Kumar of Rediff said that "Filmmaking is all about captivating your audience; it is the business of filmmaking and Flavors succeeds in this business venture." Screen called it "innovative" and "entertaining" while Dave Kehr of The New York Times termed it "bright, good-spirited and blissfully short".

==== Box office ====
In India, Flavors averaged ₹125,000 (US$1,300) per print and was the second top grosser in metro theatres for its opening week behind Vaastu Shastra. In the US, the film grossed around $150,000 on 14 screens.

== Awards ==
For their work on Flavors, Nidimoru and Krishna DK received a nomination for Best Emerging Directors at the Asian American International Film Festival in New York. The film also won the President Award at the 2003 Fort Lauderdale International Film Festival. Pooja Kumar received the Screen Actors Guild Emerging Actor Award for her performance.
