= Thaai Manasu =

- Poster
- Directed by: Kasthuri Raja
- Written by: Kasthuri Raja
- Produced by: Jothi Raja; Balan
- Starring: Saravanan; Suvarna Mathew; Babloo Prithiveeraj; Meera
- Cinematography: K. B. Ahmed
- Edited by: Lancy—Mohan
- Music by: Deva
- Production company: Karpaga Jothi Films
- Release date: 2 December 1994
- Running time: 130 minutes
- Country: India
- Language: Tamil

Thaai Manasu (transl. Mother's heart) is a 1994 Indian Tamil-language action drama film written and directed by Kasthuri Raja. The film stars Saravanan, Suvarna Mathew, Babloo Prithiveeraj and Meera, with Vijayakumar, Manorama, Goundamani, Senthil and Karikalan playing supporting roles.

== Plot ==
The film begins with Chinna Marudhu giving milk to end the sufferings of his mother Muthamma.

In the past, Thangapandi was the village chief and was a follower of Mahatma Gandhi and he was married to Muthamma. They had two sons : Periya Marudhu and Chinna Marudhu. Chinna Marudhu and Annalakshmi were in love since their childhood while Periya Marudhu fell in love with Rasathi. The two young couples finally got married with their parents' blessings.

Thangapandi's village was the only village where the citizens didn't vote for the elections; only because Thangapandi hated the politicians and lost faith in politics. Being an important and populated village in the district, the politicians tried to convince Thangapandi but they failed each time so they charged the heartless liquor smuggler Kangeyan to brainwash the villagers' mind. First, Kangeyan sent his henchmen to kill Thangapandi but Chinna Marudhu and Periya Marudhu saved him in time. Then, Kangeyan brainwashed the weak brother Periya Marudhu and turned him against his family. What transpires later forms the crux of the story.

== Cast ==
- Saravanan as Chinna Marudhu
- Suvarna Mathew as Annalakshmi
- Babloo Prithiveeraj as Periya Marudhu
- Meera as Rasathi
- Vijayakumar as Thangapandi
- Manorama as Muthamma
- Goundamani as Chokkalingam
- Senthil as Sakkarai
- Karikalan as Kangeyan
- Gandhimathi
- Kumarimuthu
- Delhi Ganesh
- Idichapuli Selvaraj
- Theni Kunjarammal
- T.K.S. Chandran
- Theni Saravanan
- Chakravarthy
- Sathyan
- Anuja
- Jayapriya
- Mumtaz
- Amutha
- Chithra
- Sevvazhairaj as Sevvazhai

== Soundtrack ==
The music was composed by Deva, with lyrics written by Kasthuri Raja.

Song	Singer(s)	Duration
"Kathoram Kallu"	S. Janaki, Gangai Amaran	05:03
"Oororam Kammakarai"	S. P. Balasubrahmanyam, S. Janaki	04:55
"Thaai Manasu Thangam"	Malaysia Vasudevan	05:29
"Thoothuvalai"	S. Janaki, Mano	04:40
"Thuppakki Na"	S. Janaki	04:22

== Reception ==
Malini Mannath of The Indian Express wrote, "What holds the film together is the emotional undercurrent running throughout, the scathing dialogues at some places and the involved performances of veterans Vijaykumar and Manorama".
