= Night of Henna =

2005 film by Hassan Zee

- Directed by: Hassan Zee
- Produced by: Hassan Zee
- Starring: Pooja Kumar; Reef Karim
- Cinematography: Hiro Narita
- Edited by: Suzun Hughes: Jeffery Severtson; Sharon Franklin
- Music by: Chebbi Sabah
- Release date: 25 March 2005
- Running time: 93 minutes
- Country: United States
- Language: English

Night of Henna is a 2005 romantic comedy film directed by Hassan Zee (Bicycle Bride), and is the first Pakistani-American feature film. The film stars Pooja Kumar, Reef Karim, Nancy Carlin, Suhail Tayyeb, Ponni Swaminathan Chesser, and Craig Marker.

== Plot ==
A young Pakistani woman is forced to choose between an arranged marriage set up by her family and her true love.

== Cast ==
- Pooja Kumar as Hava
- Girja Shankar as Abdul
- Ponni Chesser as Rafia
- Suhail Tayeb as Salman
- Reef Karim as Baboo
- Craig Marker as Justin
- Giuseppe Distefano as Shani
- Azhar Shah as Bashir
- Noor Shic as Zakia
- Nancy Carlin as Sue
- Kevin Michael Walsh as Matt
- Mary Farzaneh as Amy
- Sanjay Lovji as Mike
- Jeanette Penley as Molly

== Reception ==
G. Allen Johnson from SF Gate wrote that "Unfortunately, the plot is much too thin to sustain its 93-minute running time, and the underwritten script and sometimes painfully awkward staging and acting make "Night of Henna" rough going at times". A. O. Scott of The New York Times wrote that "Night of Henna was obviously made for very little money, and its earnest do-it-yourself feeling gives it a degree of charm, which is augmented by Ms. Kumar's unassuming loveliness". Jami Bernard of Daily News wrote that "First time writer-director-producer Hassan Zee follows a well-worn theme — the clash between generations of new immigrants — in this mildly pleasant movie". Laura Sinagra of The Village Voice wrote that "San Francisco indie striver Hassan Zee's Pakistani American spin on Monsoon Wedding hobbles a likable cast with dialogue flatter than Bollywood's cheesiest". Maitland McDonagh of TV Guide wrote that "Were it not for Kumar's luminous charisma, the film would be unwatchable".
