= Lost Transmissions =

2019 drama film

- Theatrical release poster
- Directed by: Katharine O'Brien
- Screenplay by: Katharine O'Brien
- Produced by: Filip Jan Rymsza; Al Di; Olga Kagan; Tory Lenosky
- Starring: Simon Pegg; Juno Temple; Alexandra Daddario
- Cinematography: Arnau Valls Colomer
- Edited by: Yannis Chalkiadakis
- Music by: Hugo Nicolson
- Production companies: Pulse Films; Royal Road Entertainment; Underlying Tension
- Distributed by: Gravitas Ventures
- Release dates: April 28, 2019 (Tribeca); March 13, 2020 (United States)
- Running time: 105 minutes
- Country: United States
- Language: English

Lost Transmissions is a 2019 drama film written and directed by Katharine O'Brien. It stars Simon Pegg, Juno Temple, and Alexandra Daddario. It premiered at the Tribeca Film Festival on April 28, 2019 and it was released on March 13, 2020 by Gravitas Ventures.

== Plot ==
The film centers on Hannah (Juno Temple), a shy songwriter, who discovers that her friend, respected record producer Theo Ross (Simon Pegg), has lapsed on his medication for schizophrenia. Hannah rallies a group of friends to help commit Theo to a psychiatric hospital, chasing him as he outruns his colorful delusions through the glamour and grit of Los Angeles.

== Cast ==
- Simon Pegg as Theo Ross
- Juno Temple as Hannah
- Alexandra Daddario as Dana Lee
- Tao Okamoto as Wendi
- Bria Vinaite as Micah
- Jamie Harris as Angus
- Danny Ramirez as Jake
- Reef Karim as Dr. Klopek
- Jonathan Ohye as Dr. Matsumoto
- Rebecca Hazlewood as Rachel
- Grant Harvey as Todd
- Robert Schwartzman as Darron
- Daisy Bishop as Frankie
- Jacob Loeb as Derek
- Nana Ghana as Cheyenne

== Production ==
=== Casting ===
In April 2017, it was announced Simon Pegg had joined the cast, with Katharine O'Brien directing from a screenplay she wrote.

=== Filming ===
On August 2, 2018, the last day of filming, it was announced that Juno Temple, Alexandra Daddario, Tao Okamoto, Bria Vinaite, Jamie Harris, Danny Ramirez, Rebecca Hazelwood, Reef Karim, Daisy Bishop, Grant Harvey, Jacob Loeb, Jonathan Ohye, Nana Ghana, and Robert Schwartzman had joined the cast of the film.

== Release ==
Lost Transmissions had its world premiere at the Tribeca Film Festival on April 28, 2019. The film was also screened at the American Film Festival on November 6, 2019, and at the Whistler Film Festival on December 8, 2019. Shortly after, Gravitas Ventures acquired distribution rights to the film and released it on March 13, 2020.

=== Critical response ===
According to the review aggregator website Rotten Tomatoes, 54% of critics have given the film a positive review based on 28 reviews, with an average rating of 6.1/10. The website's critics consensus reads, "Lost Transmissions finds itself occasionally stranded despite solid performances from Simon Pegg and Juno Temple." Metacritic, which uses a weighted average, assigned the film a score of 51 out of 100 based on 8 critics, indicating "mixed or average" reviews.

After its Tribeca premiere, John DeFore of The Hollywood Reporter gave a positive review by stating "Lost Transmissions gave a sympathetic and appropriately downtempo look at a musician's mental illness. The film tells its story without engaging with foolish cliches about creativity and madness." Joey Magidson of Hollywood News also gave a positive review by stating "Simon Pegg and Juno Temple have never been better, exercising new acting muscles and causing you to re-evaluate what each is capable of." Kristy Strouse of Film Inquiry gave another positive review by stating "Lost Transmissions really finds its identity in the softer moments between our two leads, as the heartbreak comes to the surface and they acknowledge their own (and each other's) struggles." Andy Howell of Film Threat felt that viewers who "might see Lost Transmissions just for Simon Pegg will come away with a deeper sense of what schizophrenia is".

Conversely, Alex Papaioannou of Popaxiom gave a mixed review by stating "Lost Transmissions takes the form of a bright spotlight that is necessary to expose harsh realities, and hopefully promote change. Unfortunately, there are times when these examples come off as misguided or played for laughs, which is upsetting whether intentional or not. This debut is a film about mental health and music, and while an important subject matter, it doesn't necessarily hit all the marks that it should. Still, Simon Pegg is absolutely fantastic and confirms his serious acting skills." Owen Gleiberman of Variety also gave a mixed review by stating "Lost Transmissions is a murky and unfocused journey, set in a Los Angeles that looks as sodden as London on an overcast day."

Emily Sears of Birth.Movies.Death. gave a negative review by stating "The plot of Lost Transmissions limits the performances, seesawing back and forth too often between Theo manipulating the system and Hannah being too stubborn to give up."

=== Awards ===
The film won three awards at the 2020 Prague Independent Film Festival — Grand Prix, Best Actor (Simon Pegg) and Best Actress (Juno Temple).
