= Five Star Hospital =

1997 film directed by Thaha

- Directed by: Thaha
- Story by: Keralapuram Kalam
- Starring: George Vishnu; Jagadish; Jagathy Sreekumar; Thilakan
- Music by: Bombay Ravi
- Production company: Screen Art Productions
- Distributed by: Screen Art Productions
- Release date: 24 February 1997
- Country: India
- Language: Malayalam

Five Star Hospital is a 1997 Indian Malayalam-language drama film directed by Thaha. The film stars George Vishnu, Jagadish, Jagathy Sreekumar, and Thilakan. The film has musical score by Bombay Ravi.

== Plot ==
The film is about Rafael, a new singer in the Malayalam film industry. It starts off by showing the current situation of government hospitals and the situation of private hospitals. N.F. Varghese plays Nambiar, a doctor who prescribes any and every test for his patients, whether dead or alive. Adipoli Ayeemutti, played by Jagadish is a troupe owner. Rafael works with him. He brings Rafael to MKM Hospital where Nambiar works. Rafael is admitted to the hospital under the fake name of O. Joseph. Nambiar prescribes many tests for Rafael. That is when he meets Dr. Sethulakshmi, who Nambiar has an issue with.

In flashbacks, it is shown that Rafael is the son of Carlos, a butcher. Rafael, however, doesn't like meat or killing animals. Father of the church brings a solution for Rafael who loves to sing by employing him at the church choir. The story takes a turn when Rafael finds out that he is adopted. How Rafael finds out about his true parents, in which Sethulakshmi is his biological mother, and understands the tactics employed by Varma to kill Rafael is what the story is about.

== Cast ==
- George Vishnu as Rafael
- Jagadish as Adipoli Aymooti
- Jagathy Sreekumar
- Thilakan as Carlos
- Sukumari
- Kalpana as Snehalatha
- Devan as Varma
- Geetha as Sethulakhshmi
- Kaveri
- Mala Aravindan
- N. F. Varghese as Dr. Nambiar
- Job Pottas as Hospital Administrator

== Soundtrack ==
The music was composed by Bombay Ravi and the lyrics were written by Yusufali Kechery.

No.	Song	Singers	Lyrics	Length (m:ss)
1	"Anaadi Gayakan"	K. G. Markose	Yusufali Kechery	
2	"Chiricheppu"	K. J. Yesudas	Yusufali Kechery	
3	"Ithra Madhurikkumo"	K. J. Yesudas	Yusufali Kechery	
4	"Maamava"	K. J. Yesudas	Yusufali Kechery	
5	"Maranno Nee Nilaavil"	K. J. Yesudas	Yusufali Kechery	
6	"Maranno Nee Nilaavil" (F)	K. S. Chithra	Yusufali Kechery	
7	"Vaathil Thurakku" (M)	K. J. Yesudas	Yusufali Kechery	
8	"Vaathil Thurakku" (F)	K. S. Chithra	Yusufali Kechery	
