= Sukham Sukhakaram =

- Directed by: Balachandra Menon
- Written by: Balachandra Menon
- Screenplay by: Balachandra Menon
- Produced by: R. Mohan
- Starring: Urvashi; Balachandra Menon; Meera; Shammi Kapoor
- Cinematography: Saroj Padi
- Edited by: N. Gopalakrishnan
- Music by: Ravindra Jain
- Production company: GoodKnight Films
- Distributed by: Good Knight Films
- Release date: 31 March 1994
- Country: India
- Language: Malayalam

Sukham Sukhakaram is a 1994 Indian Malayalam-language film written and directed by Balachandra Menon and produced by R. Mohan. The film stars Urvashi, Balachandra Menon, Meera and Shammi Kapoor. The film has musical score by Ravindra Jain. It was simultaneously dubbed in Tamil as Ippadikku Kaadhal.

== Cast ==
- Urvashi
- Balachandra Menon
- Meera as Jaya
- Shammi Kapoor as Valiyappan
- Arun
- Sukumari
- Innocent
- A. C. Zainuddin
- Suchitra
- Mahesh as Joy
- Raja
- Prathapachandran
- Bheeman Raghu
- Kalpana
- Kaveri
- Kunchan
- Manjula Vijayakumar
- Mansoor Ali Khan
- Nagesh
- Ramu
- Riyaz Khan
- Shyama as Rosline
- Suma Jayaram
- T. P. Madhavan
- V. K. Sreeraman as Varmaji
- Suryakanth
- Ramachandran
- Suresh Gopi
- Geetha
- Vishnu Ravee

== Soundtrack ==
The music was composed by Ravindra Jain.

No.	Song	Singers	Lyrics	Length (m:ss)
1	"Ninte Neela"	K. J. Yesudas, K. S. Chithra	Thikkurissy Sukumaran Nair	
2	"Oonjale"	S. Ramesan Nair	S. Ramesan Nair	
3	"Orumikkaam"	K. J. Yesudas, Chorus	S. Ramesan Nair, Thikkurissy Sukumaran Nair, K. Jayakumar	
4	"Rithumathiyaay"	K. S. Chithra, Chorus	S. Ramesan Nair, Thikkurissy Sukumaran Nair, K. Jayakumar	
5	"Sukhakaram"	K. S. Chithra, S. P. Balasubrahmanyam, Chorus	S. Ramesan Nair, Thikkurissy Sukumaran Nair, K. Jayakumar	
6	"Thirumozhi"	K. S. Chithra, M. G. Sreekumar, Chorus	S. Ramesan Nair, Thikkurissy Sukumaran Nair, K. Jayakumar	
7	"This Love"	K. S. Chithra, M. G. Sreekumar	S. Ramesan Nair, Thikkurissy Sukumaran Nair, K. Jayakumar	
