= Kadhal Rojavae =

- Poster
- Directed by: Keyaar
- Written by: N. Prasanna Kumar (dialogues)
- Story by: Robin Bhatt
- Produced by: B. Balaji Prabhu
- Starring: George Vishnu; Pooja Kumar
- Cinematography: B. Logesh
- Edited by: B. Lenin; V. T. Vijayan
- Music by: Ilaiyaraaja
- Production company: Oscar Movies
- Release date: 14 January 2000
- Running time: 122 minutes
- Country: India
- Language: Tamil

Kadhal Rojavae (transl. The rose of love) is a 2000 Indian Tamil-language romance film directed by Keyaar. It is a remake of the 1991 Hindi film Dil Hai Ke Manta Nahin, which itself is based on the 1934 American film It Happened One Night. The film stars newcomers George Vishnu and Pooja Kumar, while Sarath Babu, Charle and S. S. Chandran play supporting roles. The music was composed by Ilaiyaraaja.

== Cast ==
- George Vishnu as Vishnu
- Pooja Kumar as Pooja
- Sarath Babu as Sarath
- S. S. Chandran as Dixon
- Charle as Nixon
- Alex as Gang leader
- Suryakanth as Henchman
- O. A. K. Sundar as Henchman
- Sujith Sagar as Arun
- Thyagu as Sadasivam
- Loose Mohan as Bus conductor
- R. S. Shivaji as Mechanic
- Madhan Bob as Hotel manager
- S. N. Vasanth as Vishnu's friend
- Balu Anand as Van driver
- Vengal Rao as Henchman
- Keyaar as Himself (cameo appearance)
- M. Bhaskar as Himself (cameo appearance)
- Ramki in a special appearance

== Production ==
Keyaar had planned to make the film with Prashanth during 1996, but the actor's commitments to Shankar's Jeans (1998), meant that he could not allot dates to start the project. Consequently, Bhaskar of Oscar Movies signed George Vishnu, the son of former actress Sheela to debut in his production, Kadhal Rojavae in 1997 and according to the deal signed, Vishnu was not supposed to act in any other film until Kadhal Rojavae had been completed and released. However, during production, Vishnu could not wait and starred in a Malayalam film, while Keyaar was still shooting causing a rift between the actor and producer Bhaskar during the making of the project. Pooja Kumar, who was crowned Miss India USA in 1995, was selected to make her debut as heroine.

== Soundtrack ==
The film score and the soundtrack were composed by Ilaiyaraaja. The audio cassette was launched at a ceremony in Chennai, with M. Saravanan and Sivakumar presiding over the event as chief guests during early 1997.

Tamil Tracklist
No.	Title	Lyrics	Singer(s)	Length
1.	"Kalyana Jodi"	Vaali	S. P. Balasubrahmanyam	4:30
2.	"Ilavenil"	Vaali	S. P. Balasubrahmanyam, K. S. Chithra	5:49
3.	"Ilavenil (bit)"	Vaali	S. P. Balasubrahmanyam	1:03
4.	"Pudhu Ponnu"	Muthulingam	S. P. Balasubrahmanyam, K. S. Chithra	5:21
5.	"Manam Pona Pokkil"	Muthulingam	S. P. Balasubrahmanyam, K. S. Chithra	4:35
6.	"Sirithale"	Vaali	Bhavatharini	5:02
7.	"Ninaitha Varam"	Vaali	P. Unnikrishnan, Sunitha Upadrashta	4:56
8.	"Chinna Vennila"	Vaasan	Mano, Anuradha Sriram	5:22
9.	"Thottu Thottu Pallakku"	Vaali	S. P. Balasubrahmanyam, Sujatha Mohan	5:06
10.	"Midnight Mama"	Vaali	S. P. Balasubrahmanyam, Swarnalatha	4:56
Total length:				46:40

== Reception ==
Savitha Padmanabhan of The Hindu wrote, "Both the newcomers have a long way to go in honing their acting skills". Savitha also added that "the high point of the film is the music by Ilaiyaraja. The same can be said about the background score that lifts the mood of the film to some extent." Malini Mannath of Chennai Online wrote, "The movie has a jaded look. For those who have seen (It Happened One Night - or nearer home, Dil Hai Ki Manta Nahin) the script will be a familiar one. Vishnu [...] and Pooja, both debutants, show promise and are at ease with their roles. What stands out is [Ilaiyaraaja's] catchy song numbers".
