= Manthri Maalikayil Manasammatham =

- Directed by: Kalabhavan Ansar
- Written by: Anzar Kalabhavan
- Screenplay by: Anzar Kalabhavan
- Produced by: Noushad
- Starring: George Vishnu; Jagathy Sreekumar; Harisree Ashokan; Meera; Dileep
- Cinematography: Tony
- Edited by: K. P. Hariharaputhran
- Music by: Berny-Ignatius
- Production company: Trystar Production
- Distributed by: Trystar Production
- Release date: 17 October 1998
- Country: India
- Language: Malayalam

Manthri Maalikayil Manasammatham is a 1998 Indian Malayalam-language film directed by Kalabhavan Ansar and produced by Noushad. The film stars George Vishnu, Jagathy Sreekumar, Harisree Ashokan and Meera in the lead roles. The film has musical score by Berny-Ignatius. The film was released on October 17th during the Diwali weekend.

== Cast ==
- George Vishnu as Sreekuttan
- Dileep as Alex (Extended Cameo appearance)
- Jagathy Sreekumar as Samaran
- Harisree Ashokan as Achu (Sreekuttan's Friend)
- Narendra Prasad as Chekuthan Lawrence
- Jose Prakash as Sreekuttan's Father
- Meera as Asha Lawrence
- Kalabhavan Mani as Cleetus
- Maathu as Rexy
- Kozhikode Narayanan Nair as Alex's Father
- Chitra as Jayakumari
- Sadiq as Alex's brother
- Narayanankutty as Vinod
- Bindhu Varappuzha as Vinod's Wife
- Tini Tom as Prasad
- Kalabhavan Rahman as Driver Mohan
- Sainuddin as Jhony
- Reena as Wife of Lawrence
- Sreehari as Stanly
- Moideen Koya as Prabhakaran
- Kollam Siraj as Antony (Lazar's Personal Assistant)

== Soundtrack ==
The music was composed by Berny-Ignatius and the lyrics were written by Kaithapram.

| No. | Song | Singers | Lyrics | Length (m:ss) |
|---|---|---|---|---|
| 1 | "Karumaadikkutta" | K. J. Yesudas | Kaithapram | |
| 2 | "Mizhiyil Indraneelam" | M. G. Sreekumar | Kaithapram | |
| 3 | "Peelikkombathaadum" | K. S. Chithra | Kaithapram | |
| 4 | "Prapanjamunarum" | K. S. Chithra | Kaithapram | |
| 5 | "Prapanjamunarum" | K. J. Yesudas | Kaithapram | |
| 6 | "Thadukkaamengil Thadukeenedo" | Biju Narayanan, Maya | Kaithapram | |
| 7 | "Thirithelinja" | Biju Narayanan, Chorus | Kaithapram | |
