= Vishvarupa (disambiguation) =

Vishvarupa or Vishwaroop (Sanskrit for "having all shapes, universal form") is a term used within Hinduism to refer to:

- Vishvarupa, revealed by Vishnu in the Bhagavad Gita. Vishvarupa has innumerable forms, eyes, faces, mouths and arms. All creatures of the universe are part of him. He is the infinite universe, without a beginning or an end. He contains peaceful as well as wrathful forms. Unable to bear the scale of the sight and gripped with fear, Arjuna requests Krishna to return to his four-armed Vishnu form, which he can bear to see
- The yoked horses of the sage Brhaspati
- Trisiras, the three-headed son of Tvashta
- One of the seven tongues of fire in reference to the god Agni

== See also ==
- Vishwaroopam (disambiguation)
