= Meera (Malayalam actress) =

Indian actress

- Other name: Meera
- Occupation: Actress
- Years active: 1994–2001

Meera is an Indian actress who has done Tamil- and Malayalam-language films of nineties as a heroine as well as supporting actress. She is noted for her performance in Sukham Sukhakaram, Kottappurathe Koottukudumbam and Amma Ammaayiyamma.

== Personal life ==
She is married to director J. Suresh.

== Partial filmography ==
Year	Film	Role	Language	Notes
1978	Vayanadan Thamban		Malayalam	Child Artist
1978	Rathinirvedam		Malayalam	Child Artist
1985	Scene No 7		Malayalam	Child Artist
1990	Vellaiya Thevan	Pandiyamma	Tamil	Credited as Seema
1991	Peddintalludu	Radha	Telugu	
1991	Sami Potta Mudichu		Tamil	
1991	Malaicharal	Lead role	Tamil	
1991	Pondatti Sonna Kettukanum	Meenakshi (Meena)	Tamil	
1992	Chinna Gounder	Vadivu	Tamil	
1992	Samundi	Rasathi	Tamil	
1994	Sukham Sukhakaram /Ipadikku Kaadhal	Jaya	Malayalam/Tamil	Debut film as heroine
1994	Thaai Manasu	Rasathi	Tamil	
1994	Muthal Payanam	Lucy	Tamil	
1994	Thaatboot Thanjavoor	Ranjitha	Tamil	
1994	Veettai Paaru Naattai Paaru	Viji	Tamil	
1994	Malappuram Haji Mahanaya Joji	Mumtaz	Malayalam	
1994	Parinayam		Malayalam	
1995	Sreeragam	Ammu	Malayalam	
1995	Badili	Raatha	Telugu	
1996	Padanayakan	Seetha	Malayalam	
1996	Parambarai	Parimala	Tamil	
1997	Manikya Koodaram	Neethu	Malayalam	
1997	Nagarapuraanam	Manikuttan's sister	Malayalam	
1997	Kottappurathe Koottukudumbam	Maya	Malayalam	
1997	Poomarathanalil	Meera	Malayalam	
1997	Gajaraja Manthram	Lakshmi	Malayalam	
1998	Manthri Maalikayil Manasammatham	Asha Lawrence	Malayalam	
1998	Amma Ammaayiyamma	Maya	Malayalam	
1998	Kudumbbam	Vaidehi	Tamil	TV Serial on Sun TV
1998	Top Tucker	Indu	Tamil	TV Serial on Sun TV
1999	Ponnu Veetukkaran	Indu's sister	Tamil	
2000	Mera Naam Joker	Sreedevi	Malayalam	
2001	Yaamini		Malayalam	
1998	My Simba (2026)	Producer	Sinhala	
