= Katharine O'Brien =

American director and screenwriter

- Occupations: Film director; Screenwriter; Film editor; Camera operator; Art director; Executive producer
- Years active: 2008–present
- Notable work: The Automatic Hate; Lost Transmissions
- Website: Official website

Katharine O'Brien is an American film director, screenwriter, film editor, camera operator, art director, and executive producer best known for her work on The Automatic Hate and Lost Transmissions.

== Career ==
She started directing, writing, and editing several short films including Night Taxi (2008), Waiting Room (2009), Doppleganger (2009), The Park (2010), Illusive Fields (2012), and Breaking News (2018). In 2015, Katharine O'Brien co-wrote her feature film debut The Automatic Hate, starring Joseph Cross. The film had its world premiere at South by Southwest on May 14, 2015, followed by a worldwide theatrical release on March 11, 2016.

In 2019, O'Brien directed and wrote Lost Transmissions, starring Simon Pegg. The film had its world premiere at the Tribeca Film Festival on April 28, 2019, followed by a North American theatrical release on March 13, 2020.

=== Awards ===
At the 2020 Prague Independent Film Festival, Katherine won the Grand Prix for Lost Transmissions.

== Filmography ==
Year	Title	Credited as						Notes
Year	Title	Director	Writer	Editor	Camera operator	Art director	Producer	Notes
2008	Night Taxi	Yes	Yes	Yes	No	No	No	Short film(s)
2009	Waiting Room	Yes	Yes	No	No	No	No	Short film(s)
2009	Doppleganger	Yes	No	No	No	No	No	Short film(s)
2009	Last Cigarette	Assistant	No	No	No	No	No	Short film(s)
2010	The Park	Yes	No	Yes	No	No	No	Short film(s)
2010	Summertime Christmas	No	No	No	Assistant	No	No	Short film(s)
2012	Illusive Fields	Yes	Yes	No	No	No	No	Short film(s)
2015	The Automatic Hate	No	Yes	No	No	Yes	No	Feature film
2018	Breaking News	Yes	Yes	No	No	No	No	Short film
2019	Lost Transmissions	Yes	Yes	No	No	No	Executive	Feature film
TBA	Runaway	No	Yes	No	No	No	No	TV series
