= The Automatic Hate =

- Directed by: Justin Lerner
- Written by: Katharine O'Brien; Justin Lerner
- Produced by: Lacey Leavitt
- Starring: Joseph Cross; Adelaide Clemens; Richard Schiff; Yvonne Zima; Vanessa Zima; Catherine Carlen; Caitlin O'Connell; Ricky Jay; Deborah Ann Woll
- Cinematography: Quyen Tran
- Edited by: Jeff Castelluccio
- Music by: Hunter Brown
- Distributed by: Film Movement
- Release dates: March 15, 2015 (SXSW); March 11, 2016 (US)
- Running time: 100 minutes
- Country: United States
- Language: English
- Box office: $4,603 (US)

The Automatic Hate is a 2015 American comedy-drama film directed by Justin Lerner. It stars Joseph Cross and Adelaide Clemens as cousins who try to determine why their fathers have kept their respective families apart for decades. The film premiered at SXSW and was released in the United States on March 11, 2016. This was the last film appearance of Ricky Jay before his death in 2018.

== Plot ==
Boston chef Davis Green experiences trouble with his girlfriend, Cassie, who asks for alone time as she cries. After he goes to a bar, a woman follows him home. Curious, he tells Cassie he is taking out the trash and investigates. The woman requests a hug and introduces herself as Alexis Green, his cousin. Davis says she must be mistaken, as his father is an only child. When Cassie sees them talking, Davis asks Alexis to leave. Though upset, she gives him her contact information before leaving. Davis sits in on his father's university lecture, a behavioral psychological class about nature versus nurture. Davis offers to cook his parents a meal, but his father, Ronald, condescendingly declines. After eating alone, Davis roots through his Dad's mementos, finding a picture that indicates his father may have a brother. His ailing grandfather becomes upset and refuses to discuss the matter when shown the picture, and his father warns him away from investigating further.

Davis leaves Boston and goes to the address Alexis left him in upstate New York. After checking out the family store and farm, he calls Alexis and asks to meet her. She introduces him to her two sisters and takes him to a bar. Alexis identifies a man with whom all three sisters have had sex, then impulsively cuts off his braided beard. As the man reacts angrily, Davis punches him, and the four quickly leave. After hanging out together, they crash at Uncle Josh's house, where the sisters live. Alexis undresses in front of Davis and gives him her bed, later joining him to cuddle. Davis, who intended to leave early before encountering his aunt and uncle, sleeps late and is woken by his aunt, who assumes him to be Alexis' boyfriend. The two play along until Josh reveals he knows the truth. Josh apologizes for missing Davis' childhood, hugs him, and asks him to leave. When Josh refuses to speak any further about his brother, Davis asks Alexis to drive him to town.

Upset, Alexis asks Davis if he is leaving because of their mutual attraction and suggests that he has come over to escape problems with Cassie. Taken aback, Davis explains that Cassie recently revealed that she had an abortion. Though he acknowledges their attraction, he says it is not the reason why he is leaving. Alexis talks him into investigating her father's hunting lodge before leaving. After finding 16mm footage of their fathers with a young woman and a bracelet, Davis and Alexis have sex. On the drive back to town, they stop to assist Cassie, who has come to New York to tell Davis his grandfather has died. Alexis and Davis convince Josh to come to Boston to attend the funeral. Ronald reacts coldly to his brother's presence but allows him to stay at his house. There, Cassie and Alexis clash as both attempt to spend time alone with Davis. When Alexis tries to make out with him, citing the excitement of possibly being caught, Davis angrily tells her off.

Everyone joins a dinner Davis prepares, and, urged by their families, Josh and Ronald eat together. When Alexis flashes the bracelet from her father's lodge, Ronald and Josh both demand she surrender it immediately. A fist fight breaks out between Josh and Ronald, and each accuse the other of murder. Alexis brags to Cassie that Davis is more attracted to her but Davis punches her out before she can reveal they had sex. The next morning, Cassie leaves.

Davis helps Josh dig a grave for his grandfather, and Josh says that the woman from the footage was their sister, Rebecca. She and Josh as siblings had a sexual relationship. Brother Ronald exposed them to the family and she committed suicide over the guilt. The brothers blame each other. Ronald tells Davis that Josh's side of the family is mentally ill, and Davis expresses his dislike for them. Later, he encounters Alexis and tells her to leave after kissing her. He tells Cassie that although he is attracted to his cousin, they did nothing sexually. She accepts him back.

== Cast ==
- Joseph Cross as Davis Green - Son & Cousin
- Adelaide Clemens as Alexis Green - Cousin
- Richard Schiff as Dr. Ronald Green - Father & Brother
- Ricky Jay as Uncle Josh - Brother
- Deborah Ann Woll as Cassie - Girlfriend
- Yvonne Zima as Annie Green - Twin Cousin
- Vanessa Zima as Amanda Green - Twin Cousin

== Release ==
The Automatic Hate was released at South by Southwest in March 2015. Then in May, Film Movement acquired the rights for distribution. The film was officially released on March 11, 2016, in the U.S.

== Reception ==
Metacritic gave the film 59 out of 100 based on four reviews. On Rotten Tomatoes, the film has a 67% approval rating based on twelve reviews; the average rating is 6.6/10. Dennis Harvey of Variety wrote that " ... Though some viewers may find the sum results unsatisfying and/or unpleasant, it’s a rare film that’s able to maintain such a tricky seriocomic tone throughout." Sheri Linden of The Hollywood Reporter called it "mildly compelling but too neatly choreographed", criticizing the ease with which characters find clues and mysteries are solved.
