= Reef Karim =

TV personality, author, and physician

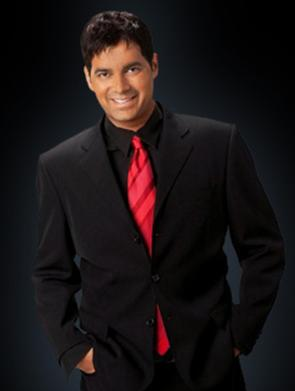
- Born: Arif Karim; Yorkshire, United Kingdom
- Education: Doctor of Osteopathic Medicine; Kansas City University of Medicine and Biosciences
- Presenting career
- Show: House of Clues, Broken Minds
- Station: Court TV
- Country: United States
- Website: reefkarim.com

Reef Karim is a television personality, international speaker, author, and osteopathic physician. He is best known as the host of the Court TV television show House of Clues, the host of the Discovery Fit & Health television show Broken Minds, a recurring guest expert on the television show Outrageous Acts of Psych, from Discovery Science, and the comedic host, writer and producer of Karim Madness.

Karim has appeared on Oprah, Dr. Oz, Dr. Phil, The Today Show, Chelsea Lately, and regularly appears on CNN as a medical and psychiatric commentator. He has written articles for the Huffington Post, Oprah.com, and Fox.com. He has also had minor roles in television shows like Lost Transmissions (2019) and Veep (2017).

In 2004, Karim was named one of "The Sexiest Men Alive" by People magazine.

== Early life ==
Karim earned a B.S. degree from the University of Illinois at Urbana-Champaign. In 1996, he graduated cum laude with a D.O. from University of Health Sciences (now Kansas City University of Medicine and Biosciences). He subsequently completed a joint internship in internal medicine/psychiatry/neurology, a residency in psychiatry, and a fellowship in addiction medicine, all at UCLA. Karim also completed the professional program in television and feature film writing at the UCLA School of Theater, Film and Television.

== Medical career ==
Karim was an assistant clinical professor of psychiatry at the UCLA for over a decade in the 2000s-2010s. He is also the founder and medical director of The Control Center, an integrated outpatient addiction treatment center in Beverly Hills, California.

== Media ==
Karim is a well known guest expert, actor and writer in the media. He has co-authored a dating book titled Why Does he do that? Why does she do that?. He is a contributor for the Huffington Post, and his work has been profiled in Forbes and the Christian Science Monitor.

As an actor, Karim played the lead in the Indie movie Flavors, with supporting roles in Lost Transmissions (2019) (with Simon Pegg), Laurel Canyon (2002) (with Christian Bale), Veep (2017) (with Julia Louis-Dreyfus), Lords of Dogtown (2005) (with Heath Ledger), Claire's Cambodia and appeared in The Breakup Girl(2015), Fit to Be Tied (2014), Posey (2012), Goodbye My Friend (2011), The Whisperers (2009), Night of Henna (2005), Russians in the City of Angels (2003), and Flavors (2004). He has also hosted multiple television shows, including Outrageous Acts of Psych, Broken Minds and House of Clues. Karim has also appeared on The Oprah Winfrey Show, The Dr. Oz Show, Dr. Phil, Hollywood Today, ABC World News Tonight, Larry King Live and Anderson Cooper 360°.

On May 26, 2012, Karim was a guest panelist at Psychology In Action and UCLA's "Psychology On The Big Screen," for his work as psychiatric consultant on the films Thirteen, The Bourne Identity, and the television shows Private Practice and Alias.

== Filmography ==
| Year | Film | Role |
|---|---|---|
| 2002 | Laurel Canyon | ER Doctor |
| 2003 | Flavors | Kartik |
| 2005 | Night of Henna | Baboo |
| 2005 | Lords of Dogtown | Dr. Angelo Gamboa |
| 2009 | The Whisperers | Rajat Gulati |
| 2010 | Adios Mi Amigo/Goodbye My Friend | Rahul |
| 2012 | Posey | Bollywood dancer |
| 2014 | Fit To Be Tied | John |
| 2015 | The Breakup Girl | Dr. Kareem |
| 2019 | Lost Transmissions | Dr. Klopek |

=== TV Roles ===
| Year | Film | Role | Notes |
|---|---|---|---|
| 2000 | Days of Our Lives | Phillipe | 1 Episode; Episode #1.8762 |
| 2003 | Russians in the City of Angels | Omar Santini | 2 Episodes; Proshchanie; Srok |
| 2004 | House of Clues | Himself | 13 Episodes |
| 2004-2005 | Extreme Makeover | Himself | 3 Episodes; Becky & Stacy; Heather & Kristi; Lachele & Marcelo |
| 2007-2009 | Larry King Live | Self | Multiple Episodes |
| 2007-2009 | Private Practice | Medical Consultant | 30 Episodes |
| 2009-2010 | Anderson Cooper 360 | Self | 3 Episodes |
| 2010 | E! Investigates: Addicted to Pills | Self | 1 Episode |
| 2010 | The Daily 10 | Self | 1 Episode |
| 2010 | Issues with Jane Velez-Mitchell | Self | 1 Episode |
| 2010 | E! True Hollywood Story | Self | 1 Episodes |
| 2010 | Good Morning America | Self | 1 Episodes |
| 2010 | Pretty Wild | Himself – Addiction Specialist | 1 Episode; And So It Is |
| 2010 | The Early Show | Self | 3 Episodes |
| 2011 | Dateline NBC | Self | 1 Episode |
| 2011 | Charlie Sheen: On the Brink | Self | 1 Episode |
| 2008-2011 | Showbiz Tonight | Self | Multiple Episodes |
| 2010-2011 | The Joy Behar Show | Self | Multiple Episodes |
| 2012 | Dr. Phil | Self | 2 Episodes |
| 2012 | Broken Minds | Host | 2 Episodes |
| 2012 | Today | Self | Multiple Episodes |
| 2013 | ABC Evening News | Self | 2 Episodes |
| 2013 | TakePart Live | Self | 2 Episodes |
| 2014 | The Dr. OZ Show | Self | Multiple Episodes |
| 2014 | Hollywood Today | Self | Multiple Episodes |
| 2015 | Karim Madness | Host | 2 Episodes |
| 2015 | Outrageous Acts Of Psych | Self | 12 Episodes |
| 2017 | Veep | Dr. Sengupta | 1 Episode |
