= Vishwaroopam II =

2018 film by Kamal Haasan

- Theatrical release poster
- Directed by: Kamal Haasan
- Written by: Kamal Haasan; Chakri Toleti; Atul Tiwari (Hindi dialogues)
- Story by: Kamal Hassan
- Produced by: Kamal Haasan; V. Ravichandran; Jude S. Walko
- Starring: Kamal Haasan; Shekhar Kapur; Rahul Bose; Pooja Kumar; Andrea Jeremiah
- Cinematography: Sanu Varghese; Shamdat Sainudeen
- Visual effects by: N. Madhusudhanan
- Edited by: Mahesh Narayan; Vijay Shankar
- Music by: Ghibran Muhammad
- Production companies: Raaj Kamal Films International, Aascar Films PVT. Limited
- Distributed by: Raaj Kamal Films International; Rohit Shetty Picturez and Reliance Entertainment (Hindi)
- Release date: 10 August 2018
- Running time: 150 minutes
- Country: India
- Languages: Tamil; Hindi
- Box office: est. ₹50 crore

Vishwaroopam II is a 2018 Indian spy action thriller film written and directed by Kamal Haasan and co-written by Atul Tiwari and Chakri Toleti. It is the circumquel to Vishwaroopam (2013) and features Kamal Haasan alongside Shekhar Kapur, Rahul Bose, Pooja Kumar and Andrea Jeremiah, reprising their roles. While the first film was set in the United States, Vishwaroopam II takes place in India.

It was simultaneously shot in Tamil and Hindi with the latter version titled Vishwaroop II. It was dubbed in other languages such as Telugu and Malayalam. Produced by Kamal Haasan and V. Ravichandran in Tamil, the film was promoted by Ekta Kapoor and Shobha Kapoor in Hindi. Initially planned as a late 2013 release, the film was stuck in development hell and was revived only in April 2017 when Haasan took over as producer himself.

== Plot ==
RAW Agent Major Wisam Ahmad Kashmiri is assigned the critical mission to neutralize Taliban leader Omar Qureshi, his deputy Salim and his jihadist network, who are plotting a devastating attack on New York City. Wisam, accompanied by his team—his wife Nirupama, colleague Ashmita, and Colonel Jagannathan—travels to the United Kingdom to perform the final rites for their fallen comrade, Dawkins. During the journey, Nirupama grows suspicious of Ashmita's closeness to Wisam, prompting her to question their relationship. This leads to a flashback where Wisam recalls meeting Ashmita, a spirited and brave young officer, during an Indian Army parade and award ceremony. Recognizing her potential, Wisam and Jagannathan recruit her for their covert operation. To infiltrate Omar’s group, Wisam and Ashmita stage an affair, leading to Wisam’s court-martial and a 10-year sentence for dereliction of duty. With Jagannathan’s help, Wisam escapes prison, is branded a militant, and, alongside Lieutenant Roy (Imtiaz), joins Omar’s terrorist network undercover.

In the present, the team is met by Goswami, an army officer acting under orders from Eshwar Iyer. While transporting Dawkins’ remains, their car is ambushed by militants, resulting in a deadly crash. Nirupama, Ashmita, and Jagannathan are trapped inside, while Wisam is thrown out. He engages and kills a pursuing militant. Goswami, fatally injured, dies content after seeing his enemy’s face, fulfilling his lifelong wish as an officer. Wisam, wounded, slips into a flashback of his earlier mission with Omar. Working with Imtiaz, Wisam attempts to plant a locator to track Osama bin Laden, Al-Qaeda’s leader, for NATO forces. Omar catches Wisam, shoots at him, but Imtiaz takes the bullet and dies. Wisam, gravely injured, signals NATO helicopters with flares and is rushed to a hospital, where he survives.

Back in the present, the team reaches their hotel, where Eshwar confronts Wisam for killing the militant instead of capturing him. Eshwar mocks Wisam’s Muslim identity, but Wisam staunchly defends his loyalty to India. Detecting surveillance devices in their room, Wisam and Ashmita destroy them, warning Eshwar against further interference. Later, Wisam, Nirupama, Ashmita, and an ISI agent, Munnavar, investigate a building for explosives. During a phone call, Eshwar urges Wisam to evacuate, but Wisam, suspecting treachery, pretends to be trapped inside. Eshwar triggers a bomb, believing Wisam is dead, but Munnavar reveals Wisam’s survival. Wisam confronts Eshwar, who commits suicide to avoid capture.

The team discovers a book detailing tide schedules, uncovering a plot tied to the SS Richard Montgomery, a World War II shipwreck off the coast of Sheerness, UK, carrying 1500 tons of unexploded ordnance. The militants plan to detonate caesium-based weapons underwater during high tide, potentially triggering a massive explosion and a tsunami that could submerge London 10 to 16 meters underwater. Nirupama, a certified deep-sea diver, dives to inspect and disable the cesium devices. Meanwhile, Wisam’s ally, Jim, is killed by a militant attempting to remotely detonate the bombs. Wisam tracks and eliminates the militant, preventing the catastrophe.

Returning to Delhi, Jagannathan is summoned for a debriefing by his superior, Seshadri, who questions Nirupama’s role in the mission and orders her removal. Jagannathan refuses, citing Wisam’s deep love for her. Overhearing this, Nirupama is touched and reconciles with Wisam, leading to an intimate moment. The couple visits Wisam’s mother, an Alzheimer’s patient in a care home, who fails to recognize him but clings to memories of his childhood through old photos, leaving Wisam emotional.

The mission takes a dark turn when Ashmita and Nirupama are kidnapped by Salim. Salim brutally kills Ashmita, sending her dismembered body parts to Wisam. Wisam is captured and held hostage by Omar, who blames Wisam for his family’s death during the NATO strike. Wisam reveals that Omar’s wife, son, and nephew are alive and safe, handed over to NATO for protection. Omar attaches a bomb to Wisam’s neck with a 40-second timer and holds Nirupama and Wisam’s mother hostage in Salim's warehouse at Daryaganj. Salim reveals a plan to detonate 64 bombs across India to mark 64 years of Indian Independence. Wisam escapes the bomb, neutralizes it in a water tank, and kills Salim. In a final confrontation, Omar attacks Wisam but dies after falling into an oil-burning stove. Wisam’s team prevents the mass bombings.

At the hospital, Wisam shows Omar’s sons, Jalal and Nasser, to the dying Omar. Jalal is pursuing an MTech in London, and Nasser is in medical school. Realizing his errors, Omar passes away. Wisam and Nirupama leave the hospital together, their bond strengthened by the ordeal.

== Cast ==
- Kamal Haasan as Vishwanathan / R&AW Agent Major Wisam Ahmad Kashmiri, a former soldier of the Indian army and agent of R&AW who has infiltrated the Taliban during America's war on terror; his past comes back to haunt his present
- Shekhar Kapur as Colonel Jagannathan (Jaganath in Hindi), one of Wisam's mentors and higher orders during his infiltration and best friend of deceased John Dawkins and Gowswami
- Rahul Bose as Omar Qureshi, the leader of Taliban. The main antagonist and Wisam's former friend whom he sees as a traitor and villain for the supposed death of his family
- Pooja Kumar as Dr. Nirupama Vishwanathan / Nirupama Kashmiri, Wisam's wife with knowledge of scuba diving and a doctorate in nuclear oncology (Voice dubbed by Abhirami)
- Andrea Jeremiah as Ashmita Subramaniam, Wisam's friend and member of the army whom Nirupama gets jealous of because of her and Wisam's history.
- Jaideep Ahlawat as Salim, Omar's deputy
- Russell Geoffrey Banks as Jim, Wisam's assistant with his operations
- Waheeda Rehman as Kashmiri's mother, who's also an Alzheimer's victim
- Anant Mahadevan as Eshwar Iyer (Rajesh Mehta in Hindi), Jagannathan/Jaganath and Goswami's boss who is revealed to be a traitor working for Omar
- Mir Sarwar
- Deepak Jethi
- Jude S. Walko as Captain Joe Black

== Production ==
=== Development ===
The film is set in India. Kamal has earlier stated that the second part will be laced with a strong mother-son sentiment. He stated that 40% of the film was shot during the making of part one itself. While part 1 was a little over 2 hours 20 minutes, the sequel's length will be less than 2 hours.

=== Cast and crew ===
Due to personal reasons, cinematographer Sanu Varghese opted out of Vishwaroopam II and was replaced by Shamdat Sainuddeen. Ghibran was signed up to compose the music.

Haasan approached Vyjayanthimala to portray the role of his mother in the film, but her refusal led to Waheeda Rahman being cast.

Haasan cast Waheeda Rahman and Anant Mahadevan for the sequel in addition to the main cast.

=== Filming ===
The shooting of Vishwaroopam II began in Thailand, with the team shooting scenes at the Bangkok airbase. There was a sequence where actors defuse bombs and engage enemies in a gun battle underwater which was done by the actors themselves after training in scuba diving. The Chennai schedule of the film started on 13 June 2013. It was also reported that an underwater fight sequence involving Kamal Haasan has been shot by stunt director Ramesh in the second week of October 2016. The film started its final schedule of shooting from 27 November 2017 at Chennai. Some promotion of the film took place on the television series Bigg Boss Tamil 2, which is hosted by Hasaan, as well as on Bigg Boss Malayalam and also in Indian Idol and Dus Ka Dum hosted by Salman Khan.

== Music ==
The soundtrack album and background score for Vishwaroopam II is composed by Ghibran, replacing Shankar-Ehsaan-Loy who composed for the first part. The lyrics for the songs of the Tamil version were written by Vairamuthu and Kamal Haasan, and the songs of the Hindi version were written by Prasoon Joshi and Sandeep Srivastava. The soundtrack rights for the Tamil version were acquired by Lahari Music, whereas the Hindi version was acquired by T-Series.

Vishwaroopam II

Soundtrack album by Ghibran
- Released: 7 August 2018
- Recorded: 2018
- Genre: Feature film soundtrack
- Length: 30:29
- Languages: Tamil; Hindi
- Labels: Lahari Music; T-Series
- Producer: Ghibran

Ghibran chronology
Chennai 2 Singapore (2017)	Vishwaroopam II (2018)	Aan Devathai (2018)
External audio
- Official Audio Jukebox(Tamil) on YouTube
- Official Audio Jukebox(Hindi) on YouTube

Singles from Vishwaroopam II (Tamil)
- 1. "Naanagiya Nadhimoolame" Released: 29 June 2018; 2. "Gnyabagam Varugiradha (Vishwaroopam)" Released: 2 July 2018; 3. "Saadhi Madham" Released: 27 July 2018

Kamal Hassan, penned and sung the song "Naanagiya Nadhimoolame" along with Kaushiki Chakraborty and Karthik Suresh Iyer, which was released as a single track by composer Ghibran, via his official Twitter account on 29 June 2018. The partial audio launch of the film was held on 30 June 2018 during the ongoing Bigg Boss Tamil 2 season. The event was telecasted on 1 July 2018, through Star Vijay. Kamal Hassan and Shruti Hassan performed the songs "Naanagiya Nadhimoolame" and "Gnyabagam Varugiradha" at the event. The latter was released a single track on 2 July 2018. While Shruti Hassan performed the song at the event, the original version of the song which was written by Vairamuthu, were rendered by Aravind Srinivas and Sarath Santhosh. The third single track "Saadhi Madham" was released on 27 July 2018. Written by Kamal Haasan and sung by Sathyaprakash and Andrea Jeremiah, the song was performed at the ongoing Bigg Boss Tamil 2 season. The full album, which consists of an EDM version of "Gnyabagam Varugiradha" and the karaoke versions of all the songs, were launched on 5 August 2018.

Tamil Track list
No.	Title	Lyrics	Singer(s)	Length
1.	"Naanaagiya Nadhimoolamae"	Kamal Haasan	Kamal Haasan, Kaushiki Chakraborty, Master Karthik Suresh Iyer	04:11
2.	"Gnyabagam Varugiradha" (Vishwaroopam)	Vairamuthu	Arvind Srinivas, Sarath Santhosh	03:25
3.	"Saadhi Madham"	Kamal Haasan	Sathyaprakash Dharmar, Andrea Jeremiah	04:31
4.	"Gnyabagam Varugiradha" (EDM Version)	Vairamuthu	Arvind Srinivas, Sarath Santhosh	03:09
5.	"Naanaagiya Nadhimoolamae" (Karaoke)			04:10
6.	"Gnyabagam Varugiradha" (Karaoke)			03:25
7.	"Saadhi Madham" (Karaoke)			04:31
8.	"Gnyabagam Varugiradha" (EDM Karaoke)			03:06
Total length:				30:29

The title track of Vishwaroop II, which was written by Prasoon Joshi and Sandeep Shrivatsava and sung by Aravind Srinivas and Sarath Santhosh, was launched on 25 July 2018. The full soundtrack album was released on 3 August 2018.

All lyrics are written by Prasoon Joshi and Sandeep Shrivatsava.

Vishwaroop II - Hindi Track list
No.	Title	Singer(s)	Length
1.	"Vishwaroop II Title Track"	Arvind Srinivas, Sarath Santhosh	03:43
2.	"Ishq Kiya Toh"	D. Sathyaprakash, Andrea Jeremiah	04:31
3.	"Tu Srotu Hai"	Kamal Haasan, Kaushiki Chakraborty, Master Karthik Suresh Iyer	04:10
4.	"Vishwaroop II Title Track" (EDM Version)	Arvind Srinivas, Sarath Santhosh	03:20
Total length:			15:44

=== Background Score ===
Vishwaroopam II

Film score by Ghibran
- Released: 07 October 2018
- Recorded: 2018
- Genre: film score
- Length: 7:16
- Language: Tamil
- Label: Lahari Music
- Producer: Ghibran

Ghibran chronology
Chennai 2 Singapore (2017)	Vishwaroopam II (2018)	Aan Devathai (2018)

Official audio = Official Audio Soundtrack on YouTube

Vishwaroopam II Ost(Tamil)
No.	Title	Length
1.	"Bathe in Thy Blood"	0:37
2.	"Battle Ain't A Climax"	0:35
3.	"Dark Is My Day"	0:23
4.	"Demon To The Rescue"	0:30
5.	"Eyes 'I' On The Walls"	0:31
6.	"Eyes'I' On The Walls 2"	0:32
7.	"Memories Do Haunt"	0:31
8.	"One Touch To Heaven"	0:31
9.	"The God's Particle"	0:31
10.	"The Mirage Pass"	0:31
11.	"The Narrow-One Way"	0:31
12.	"Watch Your Friends,Catch Your Foes"	0:31
13.	"Withering Weathers"	0:31
14.	"Your Sinless Eyes"	0:31
Total length:		7:16

== Marketing ==
The first look poster of the film was released on 2 May 2017, the theatrical trailer was released on 11 June 2018.

== Release ==
=== Theatrical ===
Vishwaroopam II was scheduled to release in February 2014, but due to delays, Hassan postponed the release. Haasan also stated initially that the film would be released as a direct to home feature in the United States. However, he later stated that he would not, as "there seems to be a lot of reticence in that." In November, Haasan stated that he hopes to release the film by 2016, but the release of the film is on hold due to the financial crisis of the producer even though some combination scenes, as well as VFX, are pending. It was also reported that Haasan will complete his portions only after his remaining salary of Rs.10 crores is settled and Lyca Productions might take over the project from Aascar Ravichandran.

In February 2017, Kamal Haasan revealed that the film was on hold as Aascar Ravichandran was not able to pay the technical crew of the film. He added that over six months' worth of post-production remained pending on the project.

The film was released theatrically on 10 August 2018.

=== Home media ===
The digital rights of the film were sold to Prime Video, while the satellite rights of the Tamil version, Vishwaroopam 2 were sold to STAR Vijay.

== Reception ==
=== Box office ===
The film grossed ₹50 crore and became one of the highest grossing Tamil films of 2018.

=== Critical response ===
The film received mixed reviews from critics. On the review aggregator website Rotten Tomatoes, 10% of 10 critics' reviews are positive, with an average rating of 4.4/10.

=== Vishwaroopam II ===
Rachit Gupta of The Times of India has given 2.5 stars and summarized "Despite having some genuinely good moments, the film tries to put forth a little too much, a little too quickly.". Behindwoods given 3 stars out of 5 and said "Vishwaroopam 2 is a fitting sequel to the masterpiece". Baradwaj Rangan of Film Companion said "A not-exactly-needed sequel, but a solid delivery mechanism for Kamal-isms". Raisa Nasreen of DGZ Media summarized "Kamal Haasan is heroic as the one man army". Sowmya Rajendran of The News Minute said "A predictable sequel short of fresh ideas". Vishal Menon of The Hindu wrote "Add that to particularly tacky production design and uninspiring visuals, you realise that it’s easy for someone to mistake the first part as the newer film. By the end of Vishwaroopam 2, we’ve seen so many bombs being planted, only for them to be defused. What’s another 100 more?" Ashameera Aiyappan of The Indian Express gave the film 3.5 stars and wrote "Do catch Vishwaroopam if possible before watching the second part. You won’t lose anything if you don’t, but there is a lot to gain if you do." Subra Gupta of The Indian Express gave the film 1.5 out of 5 stars and stated that "That leaves Kamal Haasan, who has co-written, directed and produced the film, as the patriotic RAW agent, to do all the heavy lifting. In the first edition, the veteran star-actor led from the front: here the ‘dirty soldier turned bloody espionage agent’ is all thundery lines like ‘main mazhab nahin mulk ke liye khoon bahaata hoon’. But even he can't rise above the shockingly inept script, which he rescues only in a few places, when his trademark intelligent, wry self-awareness manages to kick in. The rest can be safely ignored." Janani K of India Today gave 2 out of 5 stars and wrote "On the whole, Vishwaroopam 2 is a story that is let down by the shoddy screenplay. Even a star performer like Kamal Haasan couldn't save the audience from this mess." Karishma Shetty of Pinkvilla wrote "Is Vishwaroopam 2 worth a watch? I would recommend you to see Mission Impossible - Fallout instead. If it is of any interest, the first part of the franchise was honoured with Best Production at the National Film Awards. We rate it a 35% in the movie meter. Priyanka Sundar of Hindustan Times gave 2.5 out of 5 stars and wrote "That, however, is not the biggest problem of Vishwaroopam. That indubitably is Kamal directing the film as a director and not filmmaker. We can see the savvy politician Kamal is doing great onscreen. Wisam, unfortunately, is lost in the back ground." Shreedhar Pillai of Firstpost gave the film 2.5 out of 5 stars and stated that "The USP of the film is Kamal Haasan, who doesn’t look his age (63) and does action, romance and dialogue-delivery with consummate ease and style. Some of the action scenes are well choreographed. Ghibran’s music is a major plus point. But the sequel is nowhere near the first part and looks stretched (2 hours 21 minutes). Though part two lacks the finesse of part one, Vishwaroopam 2 is still an entertainer."

Sudhir Srinivasan of The New Indian Express gave the film 3.5 out of 5 and wrote "It’s such small, effective moments that make me feel quite fondly about the Vishwaroopam films, and despondently about Tamil cinema without Kamal Haasan, the director." Anupama Subramanian of Deccan Chronicle gave 3.5 out of 5 stars and wrote "To be fair, most of these stunts and action sequences are riveting and enjoyable. Kamal is ever present with his dry wit and self-aware punch dialogues, which also brings his political aspirations to the fore. He is relentless and although he looks burnt out due to Vis’s heavy workload, his brains never tire and is always a step ahead of his numerous halfwit villains. Enjoyable in parts!" Moviecrow gave the film's rating 3 out of 5 stating that "An engaging sequel despite the inevitable comparison with the prequel and a few misfires. Watch it for Kamal Haasan's unsatiating desire to push the bar higher. " Ananda Vikatan rated the film 42 out of 100.

=== Vishwaroop II ===
Saibal Chatterjee of NDTV gave 1.5 out of 5 stars and wrote "That pretty much sums up Vishwaroop 2. It repeatedly fires blanks - noisy but of no use. Has a movie sequel ever been so pointless?" Bollywood Hungama gave the film's rating 1.5 out of 5 and wrote "On the whole, Vishwaroop II is a highly avoidable flick. The film has too many tracks and the narration and execution is flawed and weak. Also at the box office, the film will have a tough time." Reshe Manglik of India TV gave 2 out of 5 stars and wrote "In short, it’s only Kamal Haasan doing all the work in the film. He delivers the thundery lines like ‘Main mazhab ke liye nahi mulk ke liye khoon bahata hu’ with immense grit. However, even a spectacular actor like Haasan can't rise above the script that was clearly sinking." Umesh Punwani of Koimoi rated the film 1.5 out of 5 stars and wrote "All said and done, fans of Vishwaroop should forget there was a sequel planned for it. They should again watch the part 1 instead and keep its memories intact. It’s like one of those many Hollywood actioners which are all glam and no content." DNA India gave the film's rating 2 out of 5 and wrote "Vishwaroop 2 boasts of some great cameos by Shekhar Kapur, Waheeda Rahman and Jaideep Ahlawat but they are so good in whatever little screen-time they have got that sometimes you feel they are wasted in the film. The spy-thriller doesn't rely much on jingoism, though, which is a relief."
