= Sanu Varghese =

Indian cinematographer

Sanu John Varughese ISC
- Born: Sanu John Varughese; Kottayam, Kerala, India
- Occupations: Director of photography, Director, Writer
- Years active: 2003–present
- Known for: Vishwaroopam; Wazir; Take Off; Jersey; Malik

Sanu John Varughese ISC is an Indian cinematographer, who has worked in the Hindi, Malayalam, Tamil and Telugu films. After beginning his career as a technician in DD News, commercials and documentaries, he worked on Hindi, Tamil and Malayalam films. He won acclaim for his work in Kamal Haasan's spy thriller, Vishwaroopam (2013).

== Career ==
Sanu Varughese attended College of Fine Arts Trivandrum and upon graduation went on to join the Sarojini Naidu School of Arts and Communication at University of Hyderabad, before beginning work with DD News. He became acquainted with Ravi K. Chandran and assisted him on a couple of ventures and documentaries, before making his debut as an independent cinematographer with Main Madhuri Dixit Banna Chahti Hoon (2003). He continued to work on commercials, filming over three thousand, before getting opportunities to work on the Hindi film Karthik Calling Karthik (2010) and the Malayalam psychological thriller, Elektra (2010). During the period, he also began work on Kamal Haasan's historical Tamil film, Marmayogi, but the film was shelved after pre-production.

In early 2010, Kamal Haasan called Sanu to work with him on the production of his bilingual spy-thriller Vishwaroopam (2013). The film subsequently was in production for two years, with Sanu working extensively on travelling the globe to find locations to shoot. He won acclaim for his work in capturing the terrain of Jordan, which was shown as Afghanistan in the film, and the technical brilliance of the film was noted by his peers in the film industry. The team of the film also shot for significant portions of a sequel during the making of the first film, though Varghese's busy schedule meant that he was unable to join the team for further schedules of the sequel. He also later collaborated with Kamal Haasan during the making of the bilingual Thoongaa Vanam (2015) and A. R. Rahman for videos in his album, Raunaq.

== Filmography ==
As cinematographer

Year	Film	Language	Notes
2003	Main Madhuri Dixit Banna Chahti Hoon	Hindi	
2006	Fight Club – Members Only	Hindi	
2010	Karthik Calling Karthik	Hindi	
2010	Elektra	Malayalam	
2013	Vishwaroopam	Tamil; Hindi	
2013	David	Hindi	
2014	Hasee Toh Phasee	Hindi	
2015	Thoongaa Vanam; Cheekati Rajyam	Tamil; Telugu	
2016	Wazir	Hindi	
2017	Take Off	Malayalam	
2018	Vishwaroopam II	Tamil; Hindi	
2018	Badhaai Ho	Hindi	
2019	Jersey	Telugu	
2019	Android Kunjappan Version 5.25	Malayalam	
2020	Lootcase	Hindi	
2021	Mālik	Malayalam	
2021	Shyam Singha Roy	Telugu	
2022	Ariyippu	Malayalam	
2023	Shastry Viruddh Shastry	Hindi	
2023	Hi Nanna	Telugu	
2025	Ponman	Malayalam	
2025	HIT: The Third Case	Telugu	

As director

Year	Film	Language	Notes
2021	Aarkkariyam	Malayalam	
