= Pooja Kumar =

American actress

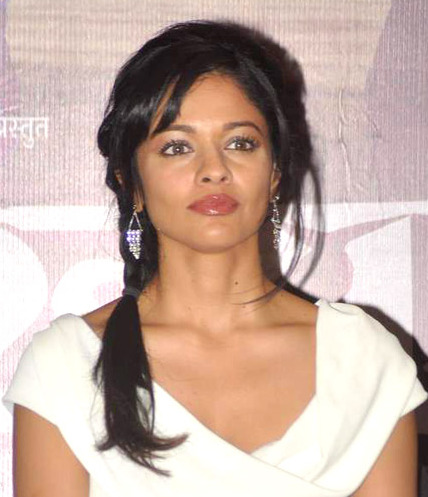
- Kumar in 2013
- Born: February 4, 1977 (age 49); St. Louis, Missouri, US
- Occupation: Actress
- Years active: 1997–present
- Spouse: Vishal Joshi (m. 1999)
- Children: 1

Pooja Kumar is an American actress of Indian descent who works in Tamil, Hindi, and English-language Indian films. After winning Miss India USA in 1995, she pursued a career as an actress and producer. She has appeared in a number of American films and shows, including Man on a Ledge, Brawl in Cell Block 99, Bollywood Hero, Flavors, Hiding Divya, Park Sharks, Bollywood Beats, Night of Henna, Anything for You, Drawing with Chalk, and Knots Urbane. Her Indian films include Vishwaroopam and Vishwaroopam 2, and she made her Telugu-language debut with PSV Garuda Vega.

== Early life ==
Pooja Kumar was born in St. Louis, Missouri. Her parents, Ravinder and Nirupama, immigrated from India in 1970. She attended Washington University, where she graduated with degrees in political science and finance. She is also trained in Indian classical dance. Kumar won Miss India USA in 1995.

== Career ==
Kumar first signed on to appear in director Keyaar's Tamil film Kadhal Rojave in 1997, but the film's production delays meant that it was only released in 2000 and her stint as an actress in the Tamil film industry went unnoticed. She was earlier signed and then left out of the 1997 film V. I. P, while she had also signed to appear alongside Karthik in Chithra Lakshmanan's Chinna Raja, but was eventually dropped from the project.

In 2003, she received the Screen Actors Guild Emerging Actress Award for Flavors. In 2008, she hosted a late-night live quiz show on Zee TV in India, known as Jaago Aur Jeeto. She appeared in the musical comedy miniseries Bollywood Hero on IFC in 2008. She starred opposite Saturday Night Live comedian Chris Kattan in the three-part series. In the late 2000s, she appeared in the Pakistani drama serial Ishq Junoon Deewangi (2009). After a long gap, she reappeared onscreen in the film 2013 Vishwaroopam.

== Personal life ==
Kumar is married to Vishal Joshi. They have a daughter, born in 2020.

== Selected filmography ==
=== Film ===
List of film appearances, with year, title, and role shown
Year	Film	Role	Language	Notes
2000	Kadhal Rojavae	Pooja	Tamil	
2003	Magic Magic 3D	Deepti	Tamil	
2003	Flavors	Rachana	English	
2005	Night of Henna	Hava	English	
2006	Hiding Divya	Palini Shah	English	
2009	Bollywood Beats	Laxmi	English	
2009	Knots Urbane	Rachna	English	
2009	Park Sharks	Pri	English	
2010	Anything For You	Uma Krishnan	English	
2010	Anjaana Anjaani	Peshto	Hindi	
2010	Drawing With Chalk	Jasmine	English	
2012	Man on a Ledge	Nina	English	
2013	Vishwaroopam	Dr. Nirupama Viswanath	Tamil	
2013	Vishwaroop	Dr. Nirupama Viswanath	Hindi	
2015	Uthama Villain	Parveen/ Karpagavalli	Tamil	
2016	Meen Kuzhambum Mann Paanaiyum	Mala	Tamil	
2017	PSV Garuda Vega	Swathi	Telugu	
2017	Brawl in Cell Block 99	Denise Pawther	English	
2018	Vishwaroopam II	Dr. Nirupama Viswanath	Tamil	
2018	Vishwaroop II	Dr. Nirupama Viswanath	Hindi	
2020	Forbidden Love	Anamika	Hindi	

=== Television ===
List of television appearances, with year, title, and role shown
Year	Title	Role	Notes
2007	Law & Order: Special Victims Unit	Debbi Channor	1 episode
2011	Chuck	Jinsana	1 episode
2021	Never Have I Ever	Noor Qureshi	1 episode
