= Vishwaroopam =

2013 Indian film directed by Kamal Haasan

Vishwaroopam / Vishwaroop
- Theatrical release poster
- Directed by: Kamal Haasan
- Written by: Kamal Haasan; Chakri Toleti; Atul Tiwari
- Screenplay by: Kamal Hassan
- Story by: Kamal Hassan
- Produced by: Chandra Haasan; Kamal Haasan; Jude S. Walko
- Starring: Kamal Haasan; Rahul Bose; Shekhar Kapur; Pooja Kumar; Andrea Jeremiah; Jaideep Ahlawat
- Cinematography: Sanu Varghese
- Visual effects by: N. Madhusudhanan
- Edited by: Mahesh Narayanan
- Music by: Shankar–Ehsaan–Loy
- Production company: Raaj Kamal Films International
- Distributed by: PVP Cinema; Balaji Motion Pictures
- Release dates: 25 January 2013 (Tamil and Telugu); 1 February 2013 (Hindi); 7 February 2013 (Tamil Nadu)
- Running time: 150 minutes
- Country: India
- Languages: Tamil; Hindi
- Box office: est. ₹220 crore

Vishwaroopam (titled Vishwaroop in Hindi; transl. The Universal Form) is a 2013 Indian spy action thriller film co-written, directed and produced by Kamal Haasan, who also stars in the lead role. The film also stars Rahul Bose, Shekhar Kapur, Pooja Kumar, Andrea Jeremiah, Nassar and Jaideep Ahlawat in supporting roles. The film was shot simultaneously in both Tamil and Hindi.

The script was written by Kamal Hassan, Chakri Toleti and Atul Tiwari and is set in New York City, where Nirupama, an ambitious nuclear scientist, marries an effeminate coward classical dancer, Viswanathan. On being suspicious of his behaviour, she hires a detective and in turn gets entangled with a terrorist cell, revealing his true identity and past. The film features soundtrack composed by Shankar–Ehsaan–Loy, with the Tamil lyrics written by Vairamuthu and Haasan himself, while Javed Akhtar translated them for the Hindi version.

Development of the project began after the release of Haasan's Manmadan Ambu (2010) when several of the crew were brought in from the United States to lend their technical expertise. The direction was taken over by Kamal Haasan from Selvaraghavan and reports indicating comparison with several English films surfaced during the production. The first teaser was revealed in April 2012 and the first theatrical trailer was revealed in June 2012. Vishwaroopam is the first Indian film to utilise the new Auro 3D sound technology. The film was also to be the first Indian film to release via direct-broadcast satellite, also known as direct-to-home (DTH), but after protests of theatre owners this plan was dropped. The film was released worldwide, excluding Tamil Nadu, on 25 January 2013 and was released in Tamil Nadu on 7 February 2013. The Hindi version was released on 1 February 2013.

Legal controversies, regarding the film's plot of India's foreign intelligence service Research and Analysis Wing's participation in America's war on terror after the 9/11 attacks perpetrated by al-Qaeda, arose as several Muslim civic organisations protested the film's release in Tamil Nadu, resulting in an official ban being imposed on the film in the state for 15 days by the Government of Tamil Nadu. The ban resulted in similar decisions in major overseas markets like Malaysia, Sri Lanka and Singapore while release was delayed in the south Indian states of Andhra Pradesh, Kerala and Karnataka. Heeding the requests of Muslim civic organisations, controversial scenes were muted or morphed, allowing the film to be released on 7 February 2013 in Tamil Nadu. Despite the fragmented and delayed releases, Vishwaroopam garnered positive reviews and grossed ₹220 crore(US$38 million) worldwide. The film became only the third Tamil movie to surpass ₹200 crore worldwide gross after Dasavatharam and Enthiran, and became the highest grossing Tamil movie of 2013 and one of the highest grossing Tamil movies ever. The film was honoured with awards for Best Art Direction and Best Choreography at the 60th National Film Awards. A circumquel to the film, Vishwaroopam II, was released on 10 August 2018.

== Plot ==
In New York City, a psychologist conducts a session with a nuclear oncologist, Nirupama, who begins to confide that her marriage was one of convenience. Her husband, Vishwanath, aka Viz, a Kathak teacher, has feminine behaviour, which prompted her to be attracted to her boss, Deepankar. She suspects that Viz has secrets of his own, and hires a P.I. to find anything to be used for divorce. She learns from the P.I. that Viz is a Tamil Muslim. The investigator is killed in a warehouse by Farukh, a prominent member of the cell led by Omar Qureshi.

A diary on the P.I. gives away Nirupama's existence, and the group led by Farukh invades her home and takes Viz and Nirupama hostage. While Viz and Nirupama are held hostage, Viz surprises Nirupama by killing Farukh and his men single-handedly and escaping with Nirupama.

Omar and Viz are then revealed to have a past; they were both involved in Taliban training camps. Viz's real name is Wizam Ahmad Kashmiri, an alleged Tamil Jihadi, wanted by the Indian Army. Omar, the leader of Taliban, accepts him into his team. One day, Omar tells Wizam that American prisoners of war are still alive and incarcerated. He orders his deputy, Salim, to behead the Captain and capture it on video. The next day Wizam sees Osama bin Laden greeting the Taliban and Al Qaeda chieftains in a cave. Then, a US-led air force begins a bombing raid on the town. Omar begins to suspect that there is an informant on his team but mistakenly orders the lynching of an innocent man. Eventually, it is revealed that there are sleeper agents scraping caesium-137 from oncological equipment to build and trigger a dirty bomb in New York City.

Nirupama is stunned to discover the true identity of Viz, along his uncle Colonel Jagannathan, his British friend Dr. Dawkins, and the young dancer Ashmita. Viz later reveals that he has a lot of emotional baggage and that he has executed many militants, including Nassar, Omar's boss. His mission is to bust the sleeper-cell of Taliban in the US. Wizam and his team try to counter Omar's plans, and in the ensuing events, they are arrested by the FBI for questioning.

Dawkins is murdered by Salim while picking up a videotape from an antique shop. The FBI later releases Wizam and the women from custody after he reveals himself as a RAW agent. Wizam, along with the FBI, takes down Omar's agent Abbasi and defuses the caesium bomb with the help of Nirupama. Omar tries to activate a bomb through his phone but fails. He then calls Abbasi, but the call is answered by Wizam, who tells him that Abbasi is not alive. Omar is shocked to hear this, but he escapes with Salim in his chartered flight. Wizam indicates that he will now go after Omar.

== Cast ==
- Kamal Haasan as Vishwanath (Viz) / Wizam Ahmad Kashmiri
- Rahul Bose as Omar
- Shekhar Kapur as Colonel Jagannathan (Tamil) / Jagannath (Hindi)
- Pooja Kumar as Nirupama Vishwanath (Voice dubbed by Abhirami)
- Andrea Jeremiah as Ashmita Subramaniam
- Jaideep Ahlawat as Salim
- Samrat Chakrabarti as Deepak Chatterjee
- Nassar as Nassar, Omar's boss
- Zarina Wahab as Psychiatrist
- Miles Anderson as Dr. Dawkins
- Nareen as Osama bin Laden
- Mukhtar Khan as Farukh
- James Babson as Tom Black
- Jude S. Walko as Captain Joe Black
- Chris Kotcher as Tollbooth Operator
- Greg Sammis as FBI Agent
- David Scott Diaz as FBI Agent
- Rajesh Selva as terrorist (uncredited)

== Production ==
=== Development ===
After finishing his Manmadan Ambu (2010), Kamal Haasan stated in November 2010 that he was working on the scriptment of his "pet project" titled Thalaivan Irukkiran, a film about an international community. Termed as a big budget multi-starrer film, it was expected to commence by March 2011, with a Hollywood studio reportedly coming forward to produce it. However, in early 2011, sources claimed that Kamal shelved that project and agreed to star in a Selvaraghavan directorial, being impressed by the one-line story narrated to him. Reports further suggested that the film was based on the 2001 American psychological thriller Hannibal, with Kamal playing a cannibal, Closer to release, Kamal Haasan revealed that he had thought of the story seven years before production began and had to convince himself that the story could be made into a feature film. The film was named Vishwaroopam, after several titles were considered, by late March and the shooting was planned to begin by mid-April and to be completed within 100 days.

On 24 May 2011, it was reported that Selvaraghavan was ousted from the project, as he was busy finishing his project with his brother Dhanush. Kamal Hassan decided to direct the film himself in addition to writing the story, screenplay, and dialogues. The producing studio, Telephoto Films, had urged him to take up the project, planning for a release on 7 November 2011. Haasan later revealed that he took over direction because Selvaraghavan wasted his dates without any progress. The film was being made as a bilingual and simultaneously shot in Tamil and Hindi languages; all the actors had to learn their dialogues in both languages. Sanu Varghese made his debut as a cinematographer in Tamil after previously working in the Hindi film, Karthik Calling Karthik and the Malayalam film Elektra. Varghese had previously been a part of the team that Kamal Haasan had assembled for Marmayogi, which did not take off. Mahesh Narayanan, a leading Malayalam film editor, was signed up for the project after he had acquainted with Kamal Haasan for the pre-production works of the film Traffic, which the actor later opted out from. The team signed up N. G. Roshan as a make-up artist after Kamal Haasan appreciated his work in the 2009 Malayalam film Pazhassi Raja, while Mahadevan Thampi was picked to be the still photographer after Kamal Haasan had worked with him for a day during his guest appearance in Four Friends.

=== Casting ===
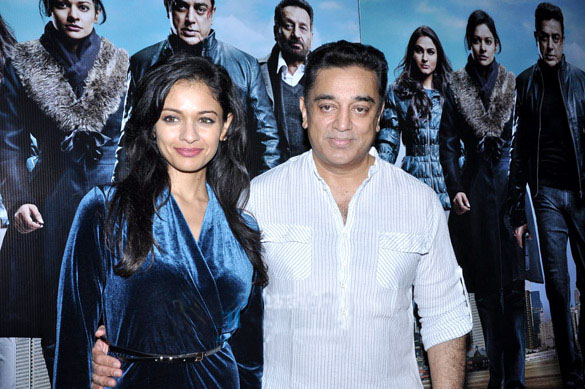
Kamal Haasan and Pooja Kumar at Vishwaroopam media meet

By February 2011, newcomer Sonakshi Sinha was approached to play the lead female character, and was confirmed to play Haasan's wife. Her salary for the film was touted to be ₹2 crore (US$210,000). However, with the film getting delayed, she opted out by July, due to conflicting dates with her Hindi assignments. Following Sinha's exit, other leading Bollywood actresses, including Katrina Kaif, Deepika Padukone, and Sonam Kapoor were considered. Vidya Balan was also approached by the makers, but she declined the offer, owing to her prior commitments. By mid-August, Sameera Reddy was reported to have been roped in for the role, while sources stated that Anushka Shetty was finalised soon after. In early November 2011, New York based model-actress Pooja Kumar was signed in for a role after she had been recommended to Kamal Haasan by his partner, Gautami. Being a non-Tamil speaker her dialogues have been dubbed by actress Abhirami, although Pooja Kumar dubbed for herself in the film's Hindi version. Telugu actress Lakshmi Manchu was offered a role in the film, but declined it due to date issues.

Shriya Saran was reported to play the second female lead in the film, with the actress dismissing the news several days later, citing that she had not even heard the script, following which Priya Anand was claimed to have secured that role. This turned out to be false, with Kamal Haasan citing that he did not know who Priya Anand was. Isha Sharvani was meanwhile selected for a role, however, Sharvani too opted out later, due to "inordinate delay in the start of the shoot". By late August 2011, British model-turned-actress Amy Jackson was reported to have been added to the cast. During mid-October, singer-actress Andrea Jeremiah had been signed on for a pivotal role and paid an advance.

Rahul Bose was finalised to play the antagonist. Later that month, actor-director Shekhar Kapur informed on Twitter that he would perform a cameo role, while Samrat Chakrabarti had also been selected for a supporting role. Jaideep Ahlawat disclosed in an interview that he would play an "out-and-out negative character" in the film. Zarina Wahab told in November 2011 that she shot for a small role in Vishwaroopam. In January 2012, Chitrangada Singh was offered a "very special role", which the actress had to decline, since her dates clashed with Sudhir Mishra's film.

=== Filming ===
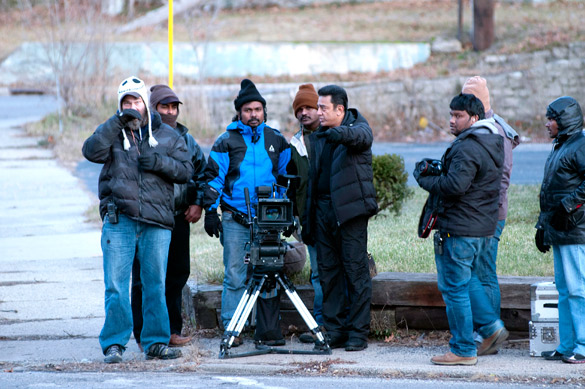
Kamal Haasan, Sanu Varghese and the rest of the crew at the filming of Vishwaroopam

The film's shooting was supposed to begin on 20 April but became delayed, since the US Consulate had refused visas to the cast and crew. The team decided to relocate to Canada, postponing filming to June. The shooting began for the film in Chennai in August 2011 and locations filmed at included Haasan's office in October 2011, when Isha Sharvani was also a part of the shoot. The film briskly progressed in late 2011, with scenes involving Samrat Chakrabarti filmed in November of the same year. Sets resembling Afghanistan were created in Chennai, with many foreigners from Russia, Iran and Africa playing American soldiers, while Haasan wore an Afghan look. In November 2011, the team also pursued schedules in Amman and Petra in Jordan with Rahul Bose's scenes being canned. Haasan learnt Kathak from Birju Maharaj for an important portion in the film.

Due to delays, casting took a relatively long period of time, with several of the original cast dropping out of the project. Vishwaroopam was shot extensively overseas in countries like the United States and Canada. Domestic locations included Chennai and Mumbai. Kamal Haasan went to the USA on 15 December 2011 for completing a schedule. The main outdoor shoots were shot in New York as the lead character is based there, and the production team also matched New York with the Grand Rapids in Michigan. Re-recording and dubbing work began in Mumbai in late February 2012, with Haasan arranging a dialogue coach in Tamil and Hindi to get the artistes' dubbing in place, with Atul Tiwari supervising the Hindi dialogues. The climax scenes featuring an aerial fight choreographed by Hollywood stuntman Lee Whittaker was filmed at Chandivali Studio in Andheri, Mumbai in early March 2012 with Haasan and Rahul Bose. The film was shot in digital format, after several false starts Haasan's previous projects. Speaking about it, he said "The fact that cinema is going digital is the biggest technological change today. We have to accept it, as it is happening globally and it will happen in Tamil Nadu too."

Gautami designed the costumes for the film. Shah Rukh Khan's Red Chillies Entertainment handled Vishwaroopam's graphics. A research had to be carried out on the American army's hierarchy for the costumes. N. G. Roshan, who had previously worked in notable Malayalam films, took charge of the make-up for the film. The villain had to undergo a heavy use of prosthetic make-up. A scene involving a war explosion had to show an injured jaw for him. Further, the artists appearing as war victims had blood and other forms of injuries applied on their bodies. The Jaika stunt team, that was also involved in Billa II (2012) at the time, worked on the action sequences. Haasan's younger daughter Akshara Haasan joined the crew as an assistant director. Kunal Rajan was roped in as a sound designer and the stunt crew for the film were imported in from Thailand. In September 2012, Haasan revealed that the film would utilise Auro 3D sound technology, making it the first Indian film to do so.

== Music ==
Initially, Yuvan Shankar Raja was reported to compose the film's musical score and songs. However, Kamal signed in the musical trio Shankar–Ehsaan–Loy to compose music for the trilingual, making it his second collaboration with them after Aalavandhan. Lyricist Vairamuthu took charge of the lyrics of the songs in the film, after Kamal Haasan had approached him and narrated the entire plot, to which he immediately agreed to work upon. Javed Akhtar has penned lyrics for the Hindi version, while Ramajogayya Shastry has done the lyrics for the dubbed Telugu version. The audio was released on 7 December 2012. The Telugu version of the audio was released on 30 December 2012 at Hyderabad. Vishwaroopam was also released in Barco's 3D cinema sound.

The song "Yaarendru Therigiratha" was also featured as a homage in the 2026 Tamil feature film Thaai Kizhavi.

== Marketing ==
The makers planned the high-budget production to premiere at the 2012 Cannes Film Festival. A special screening of the film was arranged for Hollywood-based producer Barrie M. Osborne and make-up artist Michael Westmore. Before release, it was reported to have been split into two parts, with each one having a separate release.

The first-look poster and a teaser of the film were released on May Day 2012 as part of the film's marketing process. The poster consisted of Kamal Haasan wearing a green khaki jacket, with a flying pigeon and a skyline of a city consisting of several skyscrapers in the background. Snippets from the film were unveiled during the International Indian Film Academy (IIFA) weekend and awards in Singapore in June 2012, as the actor-director screened excerpts from the film, attracting critical acclaim. A one-minute trailer was released at the award ceremony. Salman Khan organised a special screening of Hindi version Vishwaroop at Ketnav Studio, Mumbai on 1 February 2013.

An Auro 3D trailer of the film was released on 7 November, coinciding with Haasan's birthday. It included a webcast of Kamal's speech via Skype. The film is releasing in 3,000 prints worldwide. A special screening of Vishwaroopam was held at Tamil Nadu superstar Rajinikanth's house on 6 February 2013 at the 6 Degrees theatre in the Auro 3D format for his friends. On 9 February 2013 Kamal Haasan left for Paris for the French premiere of Vishwaroopam.

== Release ==
The film's Tamil version was given a "U/A" (Parental Guidance) certificate by the Indian Censor Board with minor cuts, while the Hindi version Vishwaroop, which was originally given an "A" certificate, went through minor cuts to receive the "U/A" certificate. The makers planned the high-budget production to premiere at the 2012 Cannes Film Festival. The film released with over 3,000 prints worldwide. While the movie was scheduled to release in theatres on 25 January 2013, the DTH release was planned for 2 February 2013 via six DTH players – Tata Sky, Airtel, Sun, Dish, Videocon and Reliance.

Vishwaroopam was scheduled to release in about 500 screens in Tamil Nadu, but the film was removed from screens by district collectors across the state, due to sustained protests by Muslim civic organisations. In Andhra Pradesh, the film was scheduled to release in 300 screens by Siri Media. The film released in 82 screens in Kerala on 25 January. After initial delays, Karnataka saw a full release on 29 January 2013 in 40 screens across the state.

The Hindi version Vishwaroop was released on over 1,035 screens on 1 February 2013, thereby marking the biggest ever release for a Kamal Haasan film in Hindi. It was distributed by Balaji Motion Pictures.

The film was scheduled to release on 250 screens in the overseas markets including 40 screens in Sri Lanka, 20 screens in Singapore, 20 screens in Canada. In Malaysia, the largest overseas market for Tamil films, Lotus Five Star distributed the film spending RM4 million on copyright, print and promotion. Blue Sky Cinemas distributed the Tamil and Telugu versions of the film in Canada and the USA.

The prohibitory orders imposed under Section 144 of Criminal Penal Code to ban the film in Tamil Nadu were lifted on 3 February 2013. Both the Tamil and Telugu versions of the film were screened at the Fourth Annual India International Film Festival of Tampa Bay on 16 February 2013 and 17 February 2013. The temporary suspension on the film was lifted by the Sri Lanka Public Performance Board on 10 February 2013. In Malaysia, the National Censorship Board and the Malaysian Islamic Development Department reviewed the film and the Home ministry lifted the ban on 19 February 2013. In Singapore, the film was eventually classified with an NC16 rating without requiring further edits and screened in February 2013. In 2015, the film was screened at the Habitat Film Festival.

== Reception ==
On the review aggregator website Rotten Tomatoes, 100% of 9 critics' reviews are positive, with an average rating of 6.5/10.

=== Vishwaroopam ===
Sangeetha Devi Dundoo of The Hindu stated, "Vishwaroopam is a technically brilliant, ambitious film where most characters are not what they seem", and called the film "A gripping spy thriller of international standards". Radhika Rajamani of Rediff gave 3 out of 5 stars and stated, "Vishwaroopam undoubtedly rests on Kamal Haasan, who is brilliant." Vivek Ramz of in.com rated it 3.5 out of 5 and stated. "Vishwaroopam is a nicely made thriller and Kamal's show all the way".

Sify said, "It is technically brilliant with world class making and a subject which is truly international on global terrorism." and called it a "must watch for those who seek classy, stylish and extra-strong entertainment." NDTV stated, "Vishwaroopam is likely to be appreciated by lovers of Hollywood action films." and pointed out, "The film's only minus point – the placement of songs works as speed breakers for a spy thriller." B.V.S. Prakash of Deccan Chronicle gave 3 stars and stated that the film "rides on performances." Firstpost stated that "Vishwaroopam is non-stop action Hollywood style". Praveen Kumar of OneIndia noted that the "film is on par with Hollywood standards" and gave 3.5/5.

Anuja Jaiman of Reuters said, "Vishwaroopam is a work of art that surpasses Bollywood potboilers and tries to initiate a conversation about a not-so-perfect world and its great religious divide. Watch it for Haasan and your right to freedom of expression." J Hurtado of Twitch Film said, "Vishwaroopam is a film that will, inevitably, be remembered as much for its bumpy road to the screen as it will be for its objective quality." and called it "good fun". Shubhra Gupta of The Indian Express rated the film 3 stars, saying: "This is a fill it-shut it-forget it film, whose big budget slickness never overpowers it, and which holds you while it lasts." Film journalist Sreedhar Pillai, in an interview with IBN Live said, "I think it [Vishwaroopam] is Kamal's best film as a director." and called it "a well made commercial entertainer". In contrast, Baradwaj Rangan of The Hindu said, "The surprise about Vishwaroopam is how straightforward it is, given Kamal Haasan's track record. (It's basically a big, dumb action movie, but with smarts.)"

Sudhish Kamath picked Vishwaroopam as one of five films that have redefined Tamil cinema in 2013, writing "Vishwaroopam is the most-layered film of the year and with every watch, you will find something that Kamal Haasan has planted in it, waiting to be discovered". Times of India gave the film's rating 3 out of 5 stars and wrote "Intentions of this film and the maker are good. Kamal's performance is A-grade. However the film fails, especially in the second half because there are no lump-in-the-throat moments; nor is there any shock and awe."

=== Vishwaroop ===
The Deccan Herald gave the film 4 out of 5 stars, saying "Vishwaroop is a helluva entertainer" and pointed out "The action sequences are, at last, on a par with Hollywood." LiveMint reviewed the Hindi version Vishwaroop and stated that the film is a showcase for Haasan's wide-ranging skills with both microwaves and machine guns. Taran Adarsh of Bollywood Hungama gave Vishwaroop 3 out of 5 stars and stated that the film is a Kamal Haasan show all the way, "It has an interesting premise, superb combat scenes and Kamal Haasan's bravura act as its three aces. But a stretched second hour and far from dramatic finale dilute the impact. Yet, all said and done, those with an appetite for well-made thrillers might relish this effort!"

Anupama Chopra of Hindustan Times gave 3 out of 5 stars to Vishwaroop. Meena Iyer of The Times of India gave 3 out of 5. Mid-Day gave 3 out of 5 to Vishwaroop and stated that Kamal Haasan's film is sensitive and mature but the basic problem is the inconsistent pace. Prasanna D Zore of Rediff gave the movie 2/5 stars and wrote "Vishwaroop is flawed and a big disappointment from Kamal Haasan" "At times, the film tries to preach what is just and what is unjust but fails miserably."

Rajeev Masand of CNN-IBN noted "A lot of it is unabashedly entertaining, although you'll wish the film was shorter and smarter." and gave the movie 2.5/5. NDTV reviewed the Hindi version Vishwaroop and gave it 4 out of 5 stars, stating that Vishwaroop is technically dazzling. Vinayak Chakravorty of India Today gave the movie 2.5/5 stars and reviewed, "As the sleek shots pile up, you realise what they are desperately trying to hide: Vishwaroop lacks the energy and imagination that one looks for in a good action flick."

== Controversies ==
Vishwaroopam has been in the news for several critically viewed controversies. The first of this kind was the title naming issue, where the Hindu Makkal Katchi demanded the change from its current Sanskrit title to a purely Tamil one. When Kamal Haasan announced a Direct-To-Home premiere of the film, theatre owners demanded a rollback of this plan, as they feared major revenue losses to DTH service providers. Threatened by a complete exhibitor boycott of the film, Haasan agreed to release the film first in theatres. Later, Muslim civic organisations in Tamil Nadu demanded the ban of the film and claimed, that the film was defamatory to Islamic ethos and would hurt Muslim sentiments. Although the film was cleared by Central Board of Film Certification of India, District collectors in the state of Tamil Nadu gave orders to the theatre owners to not show the film, citing law and order problems, however the film released in other states with greater Muslim populations than in Tamil Nadu. The ban in Tamil Nadu triggered also the stop of screenings in neighbouring Indian states and foreign markets.

Bollywood director Mahesh Bhatt condemned the actions instructed by Chief Minister of Tamil Nadu Jayalalithaa as a critical attack on freedom of speech in India, of which she denied all allegations against her regarding political and business interests. After persistent pressure to cut objectionable scenes, Kamal Haasan said that he could be forced to leave the state of Tamil Nadu and India, because he was "fed up at being played around in a dirty political game". He estimated the notional loss of revenue, due to banning policies, at almost ₹ 600 million. A mutual agreement with all 24 Muslim civic organisations was finally settled on 2 February 2013, when Haasan accepted to mute five scenes. Leela Samson, the then chairperson of the Central Board of Film Certification, condemned the allegations of the film being anti-Islamic stating that: "It is clearly cultural terrorism and the demand for a ban shows complete disregard to the certification given by a statutory body called the Censor Board. My team would have taken action if only the film had any objectionable content. A film goes through several levels before getting passed by the Censor Board".

== Box office ==
The film grossed ₹220 crore (US$37.54 million) worldwide, and is currently one of the highest-grossing Tamil films of all time.

=== India ===
On its opening day of release in Tamil Nadu, 8 February 2013, Vishwaroopam netted ₹58.1 million (US$600,000) at the box office. The film accounted for 90% of the takings in Chennai box office on its opening weekend, grossing ₹30.6 million (US$320,000), 89% on its second weekend, 78% on its third weekend, 38% on its fourth weekend, 28% on its fifth weekend and 2.1% on its sixth weekend. The film earned over ₹128 million (US$1.3 million) nett after eight weekends in Chennai box office. In Tamil Nadu, the film did not get exemption from entertainment tax due to U/A certificate. It yielded ₹7 crore or 10 per cent of the total entertainment tax revenue of the year for the exchequer.

The Hindi version of the film did well at the box office with 45% opening and netting ₹ 115 million in its first week, and a lifetime business of ₹ 190 million nett. The film completed a 100-day run in Tamil Nadu and 100 days in Bangalore city.

=== Overseas ===
In Malaysia, the film grossed US$325,871 after three weekends. The distributor refunded up to $1 million of advances to 65 exhibitors due to abrupt cancellation of shows.

In the UK and Ireland, the film grossed £308,350 from 20 screens after five weekends.

In the US, the Tamil version grossed $1,039,994 from 44 screens after eight weekends while the Telugu version grossed $200,293 after seven weekends from 21 screens.

== Circumquel ==
Kamal Haasan, Chakri Toleti and Atul Tiwari mentioned that the circumquel Vishwaroopam II was already planned and more sequences had already been shot featuring Andrea Jeremiah in a more prominent role. The circumquel was released on 10 August 2018.
