= Vishwaroopam controversies =

2013 film controversies

The 2013 Indian film Vishwaroopam was the subject of several controversies including objections to the title, planned direct-to-home film release, and the film's depictions of Islamic people.

== Title ==
In June 2012, the film was scrutinized by the Hindu Makkal Katchi. The political party, who objected to the use of the Sanskrit language in the title, demanded it be changed to Tamil per the party's strict moral guidelines. They claimed that Vishwaroopam was a Sanskrit word rather than a Tamil word and argued that Kamal Haasan was against his native language Tamil by naming the film in another language. The same political party had earlier protested against the song "Kannodu Kannai Kalandhal" in Haasan's Manmadan Ambu (2010), resulting in the song being removed from the film.

== Direct-to-home release ==
Kamal Haasan received backlash from theatre owners when he announced the film would be released on direct-to-home (DTH) services, only a few hours before the theatre release. Haasan had successfully roped in DTH television operators to release the movie on DTH eight hours before its release in movie theatres. The DTH release was planned as a one-time show, a few hours before the film releases in theatres, and would have cost approximately ₹1,000 (US$12). Haasan was keen on releasing Vishwaroopam on the DTH platform, stating, "If only three percent of the population in Tamil Nadu use DTH services, then how much loss can one show of my film possibly cause the producers or theatre owners?".

This decision was reverted after the Tamil Nadu theatre organizations protested against the DTH television release. Talks with theatre owners ended in a compromise, where the DTH version would be released one week after the theatrical release in Tamil and Telugu and one day after its release in Hindi in North India, on 2 February. After the change, Haasan filed a complaint at the Competition Commission of India against the Tamil Nadu Theatre Owners Association for "anti-competitive practices" in restricting the release of Vishwaroopam. The CCI ordered a probe by its investigation arm Director General as a comparable prima facie case exists.

== Depiction of Muslims ==
Muslim groups in Tamil Nadu demanded the film be banned and claimed that the film would harm Muslim sentiments. Although the film was cleared by the Central Board of Film Certification of India, district collectors in the state of Tamil Nadu issued orders to the theatre owners refusing to screen Vishwaroopam, citing law and order problems. However, the film was released in other states with greater Muslim populations than in Tamil Nadu. The ban in Tamil Nadu triggered the stop of screenings in neighbouring Indian states as well as a few international markets.

The film fraternity of India condemned the actions of Chief Minister of Tamil Nadu Jayalalithaa in censoring the movie as what they believed to be an attack on freedom of speech in India, but she denied all of the allegations against her regarding political and business interests. After persistent pressure to cut the film's allegedly objectionable scenes, Kamal Haasan said that he could be forced to leave the state of Tamil Nadu and India. The reason is said to be that he was "fed up at being played around in a dirty political game". He estimated the loss of revenues due to banning policies somewhere between ₹300–600 million. A mutual agreement with the Muslims of Tamil Nadu was finally settled on 2 February 2013, when Haasan agreed to mute five scenes of the film.

=== Protests and banning ===
Islamic organizations had earlier demanded that the film be screened by them before its release, expressing concern over the depiction of the Muslim community in the movie. Haasan organized a special film screening for them following their demand. The screening of the film had been delayed for 15 days by the government of Tamil Nadu under Section 144 of the Indian Criminal Procedure Code due to persistent allegations made by Islamic organizations, including the Tamil Nadu Muslim Munnetra Kazagham (TMMK), while negotiations were still work in progress. TMMK leader M. H. Jawahirullah claimed, "There is a danger that the public may view any Muslim with a beard as a terrorist waiting for an opportunity to plant a bomb." Kamal Haasan released a protest note, criticizing them for using an "icon bashing" tactic to profile themselves politically. Contrary to Jawahirullah, he also stated that the film would give Muslims a sense of pride.

Haasan took the matter to the Madras High Court, seeking an immediate rollback of the government ban based on the approval by the Central Board of Film Certification. However, Justice K. Venkatraman stayed the screening of Vishwaroopam until 28 January, delaying the release in Tamil Nadu for three days, to review the film. The Madras High Court upheld the ban in Tamil Nadu on 30 January 2013. It was suggested that the judge was awaiting the result of Haasan's other case against District collectors, who gave orders to ban the film's release. The Andhra Pradesh government stopped the screening in Hyderabad and other areas where the Milad-un-Nabi festival is celebrated by Muslims. In contrast, a precautionary stop of screenings was enacted by the distributor in Bangalore in light of Tamil Nadu's ban. Kerala saw an unlimited release of the film, although some Muslim outfits were reportedly arrested by the police of Kerala for disrupting screenings. In Thiruvananthapuram, a group of supporters of the Social Democratic Party of India (SDPI) took a protest demonstration at the theatre complex.

The film was later confirmed to be released on 26 January in Hyderabad and on 27 January in 25 theatres across Karnataka, including 15 in Bangalore. Despite protests, Vishwaroopam was screened in Karnataka on 26 January 2013. Protests interrupted film screenings in some parts of Mysore, Bangalore, and Shimoga districts. However, Vishwaroopam was taken off theatres across Karnataka following a police advisory. Meanwhile, theatres in Malaysia and Sri Lanka removed the film, citing the ban in Tamil Nadu. The film was released in Uttar Pradesh, where leaders initially reserved a possible ban for the film without any major incidents.

Haasan said he would file a petition in the Supreme Court to overturn the ban. Haasan expressed grief during a press conference he held at his residence, which he had pawned as part of securing the budget for Vishwaroopam. At the widely broadcast press conference, he referenced filmmaker M. F. Husain when he stated his intent to emigrate from Tamil Nadu to another secular state or country. Kamal Haasan said, "I mean no harm. The film is not about hurting Muslims. The good Muslims in the films are Indians, and the bad Muslims are terrorists who are not from India. How can I paint terrorist...terrorism white." For further talks, the Muslim party demanded a film cut of around nine minutes. Chief Minister Jayalalithaa defended the government's action, stating it was not in a position to provide security across all 524 theatres where it was to be screened from 25 January. A mutual agreement was finally settled on 2 February 2013, when Haasan agreed to mute five scenes. The Malaysian government would meet with the distributor of Vishwaroopam to find a solution to lift the ban. The National Censorship Board and the Malaysian Islamic Development Department reviewed the film, and the Home Ministry lifted the ban on 19 February 2013. While initial banned in Singapore, the film was eventually screened in February 2013, after the authorities given the film an NC16 rating without requiring further edits.

=== Reactions from Indian filmmakers ===
These developments have been widely criticized by several filmmakers and politicians alike. Backing Kamal Haasan, Rajinikanth stated,

"The fact that Kamal Haasan held a special screening of the movie to Muslim brothers meeting their demand despite being cleared by the Censor Board shows his respect for the community. Kamal is not an ordinary artiste. He is a great artiste who has taken Tamil cinema to the global level. I request my Muslim brothers to factor in this and change their stand of demanding for a complete ban".

Leela Samson, chairperson of the Central Board of Film Certification, condemned the allegations of the film being anti-Islamic stating that:

"It is clearly cultural terrorism and the demand for a ban shows complete disregard to the certification given by a statutory body called the Censor Board. My team would have taken action if only the film had any objectionable content. A film goes through several levels before getting passed by the Censor Board".

Shah Rukh Khan, who also faced obstructions during the release of Billu Barber (2009) and My Name is Khan (2010) and whose Red Chillies VFX was responsible for Vishwaroopam's visual effects, expressed sympathies for Haasan's situation, stated that a ban is "the most unfortunate thing to happen to a film." The banning of Vishwaroopam was deemed "unfair" by Prakash Raj, who stated that "cultural terrorism should stop." The film's ban was decried by Ajith Kumar, who questioned whether India was a "secular nation or being played on the basis of vote bank politics". Fellow filmmaker Bharathiraja compared Haasan to the likes of Bharathiyar for his bold statements on social issues in his films. Demonstrating solidarity, Vijay and the crew of Thalaivaa halted filming until the release of Vishwaroopam in Tamil Nadu. Actor-director R. Parthiban stated that "people are the best judges and that they should decide on whether the film is against a community." Filmmaker Mahesh Bhatt said that the humiliation of an "immaculate actor" and "national treasure" is "one of the darkest moments for the entire film fraternity."

Other individuals who expressed their disapproval of the film's ban include Sushilkumar Shinde, Aamir Khan, Anubhav Sinha, Manoj Bajpayee, Siddharth, R. Madhavan, Dhanush, A. R. Murugadoss, Linguswamy, Ameer Sultan, Muktha Srinivasan, Salman Rushdie, Deepa Mehta, Salman Khan, Abhishek Bachchan, Chitrangda Singh, Amitabh Bachchan, Farhan Akhtar, Akshay Kumar, Mahesh Babu, Pawan Kalyan, Anupam Kher, Karan Johar, A. Samad Said, Madhur Bhandarkar, Shabana Azmi, Shyam Benegal and Ketan Mehta. Film critic Baradwaj Rangan mentioned, "This film glorifies Islam, portraying the Muslim as an upstanding specimen who won’t think twice before punishing a wrongdoer from his faith."

=== Political response ===
Dravida Munnetra Kazhagam president M. Karunanidhi alleged that the inactivity of the J. Jayalalithaa administration on the film is the result of wrath over Kamal Haasan who had recently expressed his opinion "on wanting to see a dhoti-clad Tamilian" for prime minister at a function in Chennai. The comment was made at a function attended by Finance Minister P. Chidambaram and Karunanidhi. Karunanidhi accused Jayalalithaa of being involved in a conflict of interest; Jaya TV, a television network closely associated with the All India Anna Dravida Munnetra Kazhagam, had previously placed a bid on the satellite distribution rights for Vishwaroopam, which Haasan declined citing a low offer.

Jayalalithaa justified the ban to maintain law and order based on intelligence reports and said that there was no political motive behind the move. She also offered support from the government to facilitate talks to see the release of the film and said she would sue Karunanidhi and the media for maligning her on the issue.

== Other issues ==
Tamil Nadu Brahmin Association (TAMBRAS) filed a complaint with the City police commissioner that the film contained scenes that offended the community and requested to be removed. A petition asking for a nationwide ban on screening the film citing some of the scenes offending the Christian community was dismissed by the Madras High Court. Director Ameer stated that Vishwaroopam portrayed Talibans as "cruel and inhumane. At the same time, according to him, they were actually "helpless citizens fighting for the right of their own country," an issue that was not debated about. He compared the Taliban to the Sri Lankan Tamil militant group, the Liberation Tigers of Tamil Eelam (LTTE), saying, "Just like how Prabhakaran and his associates fought for their Eelam rights, the Taliban fight for their country. And similar to how it is an injustice to the Eelam if we were to portray them as raw terrorists, it is equally absurd of Vishwaroopam to have portrayed Taliban as mad destroyers".
