= List of programs broadcast by Imagine TV =

Following is the list of all programmes broadcast by Imagine TV before the channel ceased all its operations.

== Comedy series ==
Year	Show	Notes
2008–2009	Angrezi Mein Kehte Hain	
2009	Ghar Ki Baat Hai	
2008–2009	Jasuben Jayantilaal Joshi Ki Joint Family	
2008–2009	Raju Hazir Ho	

== Drama series ==
Year	Show	Notes
2010–2011	Armanon Ka Balidaan-Aarakshan	
2010–2012	Baba Aiso Varr Dhoondo	
2009	Basera	
2009–2011	Bandini	
2011–2012	Beend Banoongaa Ghodi Chadhunga	
2008–2009	Chand Ke Paar Chalo	
2011–2012	Chandragupta Maurya	
2009	Dehleez	
2011–2012	Dharampatni	
2008	Dharam Veer	
2010	Do Hanson Ka Jodaa	
2011–2012	Dwarkadheesh - Bhagwaan Shree Krishn	
2008	Ek Packet Umeed	
2010–2011	Gunahon Ka Devta	
2011	Haar Jeet	
2012	Jamuna Paar	
2009–2010	Jyoti	
2010–2011	Jamunia	
2009	Kitani Mohabbat Hai	
2010–2011	Kitani Mohabbat Hai Season 2	
2010	Kashi – Ab Na Rahe Tera Kagaz Kora	
2011	Looteri Dulhan	
2008–2009	Main Teri Parchhain Hoon	
2008–2009	Mahima Shani Dev Ki	
2012	Me Aajji Aur Sahib	
2009–2010	Meera	
2010	Neer Bhare Tere Naina Devi	
2011	Pardes Mein Mila Koi Apna	
2008	Raajkumar Aaryyan	
2008–2009	Radhaa Ki Betiyaan Kuch Kar Dikhayengi	
2010–2011	Rakt Sambandh	
2008–2009	Ramayan	
2009–2010	Rehna Hai Teri Palkon Ki Chhaon Mein	
2011–2012	Sawaare Sabke Sapne Preeto	
2009	Seeta Aur Geeta	
2010	Sarvggun Sampanna	
2008	Vijay - Desh Ki Aankhen	

== Reality/non-scripted programming ==
Year	Show	Notes
2011	Baba's Cross Connection	
2010	Big Money	
2010	Dil Jeetegi Desi Girl	
2009	Dhoom Macha De	
2011	Gajab Desh Ki Ajab Kahaniyaan	
2012	Gyan Guru	
2008	Indiadhanush	
2008	Junoon - Kuchh Kar Dikhaane Ka	
2010–2011	Job Time TV	
2009	Knights and Angels	
2010	Meethi Choori No 1	
2008–2011	Nachle Ve with Saroj Khan	
2008–2009	Oye! It's Friday!	
2009	Pati Patni Aur Woh	
2009–2011	Raaz Pichhle Janam Ka	
2010–2011	Rakhi Ka Insaaf	
2010	Rahul Dulhaniya Le Jayega	
2009	Rakhi Ka Swayamwar	
2011	Ratan Ka Rishta	
2008	Say Shaava Shaava	
2011	Shaadi 3 Crore Ki	
2008–2009	Still Moving Still Shaking	
2012	The Tara Sharma Show	
2011	Zor Ka Jhatka: Total Wipeout	
