= Bigg Boss (Hindi TV series) season 7 =

Indian reality show (2013)

Bigg Boss
- Season 7
- Logo for the seventh season of Bigg Boss
- Presented by: Salman Khan
- No. of days: 104
- No. of housemates: 20
- Winner: Gauahar Khan
- Runner-up: Tanishaa

Release
- Original network: Colors TV
- Original release: 15 September – 28 December 2013

Season chronology
- ← Previous; Season 6 Next → Season 8

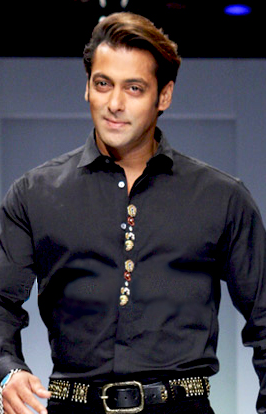
Salman Khan appointed as a host 4th time in series

Bigg Boss 7 also known as Bigg Boss: Jannat Ka Wow Aur Jahannam Ka Aaw Dekhege Saath Saath or simply Bigg Boss: Saath Saat is the seventh season of the Indian reality TV series Bigg Boss which aired on TV channel Colors TV from 15 September 2013. Salman Khan returned as the host for the fourth time for a season which was longer than its predecessor, Bigg Boss 6 and lasted for 15 weeks (104 days) concluding on 28 December 2013. The seventh season was launched with the tagline- 'Jannat Ka Wow Aur Jahannam Ka Aaw Dekhege Saath Saath'.

The series was won by Indian model and actress Gauahar Khan on 28 December 2013. While Tanishaa was runner-up, Ajaz Khan remained 3rd and Sangram Singh remained 4th.

== Production ==
=== Eye Logo ===
The season had a realistic eye logo having hell and heaven in the background. The eye featured eyelashes made of fire, red iris and black pupil having white veins in reddish sclera.

=== House ===
The contestants were initially divided into two separate sections of the house, one called "Heaven" and the other "Hell." The "Heaven" side of the house included the pool and considerably more luxuries, while residents of the "Hell" side lacked running water and a kitchen of their own. Inmates in "Hell" were forced to rely on the housemates in the "Heaven" side for food and to use a tap outdoors for water. This was revealed to the housemates on launch night, and entrants Tanishaa and Andy were tasked with dividing them into households.

As long as the division lasted, inmates were not permitted to cross the boundaries or, except for food, share items between the two sides. On the 31st day, the "Hell" facility was demolished and all remaining contestants moved to "Heaven."

=== Broadcast ===
The series was first broadcast in India on network Colors beginning 15 September 2013. The series was also broadcast in Pakistan on ARY Digital beginning 21 September 2013 and in the United Kingdom on Colors UK on 15 September 2013.

== Housemate status ==
Sr	Housemate	Day entered	Day exited	Status
1	Gauahar	Day 1	Day 44	Walked
1	Gauahar	Day 45	Day 104	Winner
2	Tanishaa	Day 1	Day 104	1st runner-up
3	Ajaz	Day 40	Day 104	2nd runner-up
4	Sangram	Day 1	Day 104	3rd runner-up
5	Andy	Day 1	Day 101	Evicted
6	Armaan	Day 1	Day 94	Ejected
6	Armaan	Day 95	Day 98	Evicted
7	Kushal	Day 1	Day 44	Ejected
7	Kushal	Day 68	Day 95	Evicted
8	Kamya	Day 1	Day 91	Evicted
9	Sofia	Day 45	Day 84	Evicted
10	Elli^{1}	Day 1	Day 70	Evicted
11	Pratyusha	Day 1	Day 63	Evicted
12	Candy	Day 42	Day 56	Evicted
13	Apurva	Day 1	Day 49	Evicted
14	Asif	Day 11	Day 42	Evicted
15	Vivek	Day 32	Day 38	Evicted
16	Shilpa	Day 1	Day 35	Evicted
17	Ratan	Day 1	Day 28	Evicted
18	Anita	Day 1	Day 21	Evicted
19	Rajat	Day 1	Day 14	Evicted
20	Hazel	Day 1	Day 7	Evicted

== Housemates ==
The participants in the order of appearance and entered in house are:

=== Original entrants ===
- Tanishaa – Hindi, Marathi, Bengali, Telugu and Tamil actress. She is the daughter of Tanuja & Shomu Mukherjee and is the youngest sister to Kajol. She had appeared in films like Neal N Nikki & One Two Three.
- Andy Kumar – VJ and reality television host. He has worked as an VJ for Channel V and is also the winner of Life OK's cooking reality show, Welcome – Baazi Mehmaan-Nawaazi Ki.
- Gauahar Khan – Actress, reality TV star, model She participated in Jhalak Dikhhla Jaa 3. She appeared in films like Once Upon a Time in Mumbaai and Ishaqzaade.
- Ratan Rajput – Television actress. She is well known for her roles in Imagine TV's Radhaa Ki Betiyaan Kuch Kar Dikhayengi & Zee TV's Agle Janam Mohe Bitiya Hi Kijo. She was also a part of reality show, Ratan Ka Rishta.
- Apurva Agnihotri – Actor wed to fellow contestant Shilpa Saklani. He acted in shows like Jassi Jaissi Koi Nahin and Sapna Babul Ka...Bidaai.
- Shilpa Saklani – Actress wed to fellow contestant Apurva Agnihotri. She is known for her roles in Kyunki Saas Bhi Kabhi Bahu Thi as Ganga and Jassi Jaissi Koi Nahin as Vidhi.
- Hazel Keech – British actress and model who works in India. She appeared in films like Kabhi Khushi Kabhie Gham, Harry Potter and Bodyguard. She danced in the song 'Aa Ante' from the film Maximum.
- Kamya Panjabi – Television actress. She is known for her role in Star Plus's Maryada: Lekin Kab Tak?.
- Kushal Tandon – Model and television actor. He is known for acting in Ek Hazaaron Mein Meri Behna Hai as Virat. He also was seen in Nach Baliye with Elena Boeva.
- Rajat Rawail – Producer and film actor He is best known as the producer of films such as No Problem (2010) and Ready (2011).
- Elli Avram – Swedish Greek actress. She made her Bollywood debut with the film Mickey Virus opposite Manish Paul.
- Sangram Singh – Wrestler and reality television personality. He is known for participating in the reality show Survivor India.
- Armaan Kohli – Actor He appeared in many films in the 1990s.
- Pratyusha Banerjee – Television actress. She was known for her role as Anandi in Colors TV's Balika Vadhu and participating in Jhalak Dikhhla Jaa 5.
- Anita Advani – Actress. She was in the news after Rajesh Khanna's death, claiming to have been his live-in partner.

=== Wild card entrants ===
- Asif Azim – Bangladeshi born model. He has worked for designer Manish Malhotra.
- Vivek Mishra – Model and naked yoga trainer. He gained attention in the media for accusing former housemate Raja Chaudhary for attempting to rape him.
- Ajaz Khan – Actor. He is known for acting in shows like Karam Apna Apna and Jeevan Saathi.
- Candy Brar – Model. She participated in the popular youth show MTV Roadies in 2004. She is the former girlfriend of Kushal Tandon.
- Sofia Hayat – British actress and singer. She has worked on both British and Indian projects such as show Waterloo Road and film Cash and Curry.

== Twists ==
=== Bigg Boss Warden ===
The Bigg Boss Warden was a new feature for season seven. She monitored inmates and kept them on time.

=== Housemates allotment ===
Housemate	Week 1		Week 2	Week 3	Week 4		Week 5	Week 6	Week 7		
Housemate	Day 1	Day 4	Day 11	Day 18	Day 25	Hell House Closed	Day 32	Day 42	Day 44	Day 45	Day 48
Housemate	^{[1]}	^{[2]}	^{[3]}	^{[4]}	^{[5]}	Hell House Closed	^{[6]}	^{[7]}	None	^{[8]}	^{[9]}
Andy	Heaven ↑		Hell ↓	Heaven ↑	Hell ↓	Hell House Closed	Main House ↑			Caravan ↓	Main House ↑
Ajaz						Hell House Closed		Caravan ↓		Main House ↑	
Armaan	Hell ↓	Heaven ↑		Hell ↓	Heaven ↑	Hell House Closed	Main House ↑				
Candy						Hell House Closed		Caravan ↓		Main House ↑	
Elli	Hell ↓				Heaven ↑	Hell House Closed	Main House ↑				
Gauahar	Heaven ↑	Hell ↓	Heaven ↑	Hell ↓	Heaven ↑	Hell House Closed	Main House ↑			Main House ↑	
Kamya	Hell ↓			Heaven ↑		Hell House Closed	Main House ↑				
Pratyusha	Hell ↓			Heaven ↑		Hell House Closed	Main House ↑				
Sangram	Heaven ↑		Hell	Heaven	Hell	Hell House Closed	Main House ↑				
Sofia						Hell House Closed				Caravan ↓	Main House ↑
Tanishaa	Heaven ↑			Hell ↓	Heaven	Hell House Closed	Main House ↑				
Apurva	Hell ↓			Heaven ↑	Hell ↓	Hell House Closed	Main House ↑				
Kushal	Hell ↓		Heaven ↑	Hell ↓		Hell House Closed	Main House ↑				
Asif			Heaven ↑	Hell ↓	Heaven ↑	Hell House Closed	Main House ↑				
Vivek						Hell House Closed	Main House ↑				
Shilpa	Heaven ↑				Hell ↓	Hell House Closed	Main House ↑				
Ratan	Hell ↓			Heaven ↑	Hell ↓	Hell House Closed					
Anita	Heaven ↑			Hell ↓		Hell House Closed					
Rajat	Heaven ↑					Hell House Closed					
Hazel	Hell ↓					Hell House Closed					

1. All the house specifications were given by the first two entrants (Andy & Tanishaa) as per the order of Bigg Boss, and the decision for allotment of Tanishaa and Andy was opposite to the second last entrants to their allotment, according to Bigg Boss orders.
2. Bigg Boss asked the heaven housemates to choose from among them a housemate who is, according to them, ineligible to live on the heaven side. The housemate with the maximum votes is made to swap places with a decided housemate from the hell side inmates. Gauahar, receiving the majority votes, was made to switch sides with Armaan.
3. Housemates decided by mutual consensus the names of the two housemates, from both sides, they would like to move. Hell housemates chose Gauahar and Kushal and heaven housemates Andy and Sangram.
4. Bigg Boss asked housemates from both sides to decide by mutual consensus the name of one best and worst performer from their side. All inmates except the worst performer, from hell, and the best performer, from heaven, were made to switch sides. All housemates except Shilpa and Elli switched sides.
5. Bigg Boss asked Kamya, being the house captain and immune from house-side switch, to name one housemate from heaven who had the greatest contribution in the luxury budget task. Simultaneously Armaan was to name two hell housemates who contributed the least in the task. Kamya chose Andy and Armaan himself and Kushal. All housemates except the names ones were to swap sides. However, during the swap ceremony Bigg Boss asked each switching hell housemate to swap positions with one heaven inmate. Pratyusha, after not being chosen by any hell-mate was spared the switch. Later, using the wishing wall, Kamya, Pratyusha and Tanishaa wished for Armaan to be transferred to heaven. Bigg Boss fulfilling the wish asked these three to name one housemate to swap Armaan with. They chose Andy.
6. All hell mates were shifted to the heaven side as the hell was completely destroyed. Bigg Boss also announced that the heaven side was the "Bigg Boss House" now.
7. Two new contestants (Ajaz & Candy) entered the Bigg Boss Caravan.
8. Ajaz and Candy were first shifted to the Main House. Later, Andy was moved to the Bigg Boss Caravan as he was earlier selected by the captain (Kushal) for discussing and plotting nominations (12, 13) which was a violation of Bigg Boss rule. New contestant Sofia also entered the Caravan.
9. Andy was moved back to the main house along with Sofia.

== Guest appearances ==
Week(s)	Guest(s)	Notes
Launch Night	Kapil Sharma, Ali Asgar and Upasana Singh	Appearances on the premier of the season to welcome housemates to the new house.
Launch Night	Sana Khan, Karishma Kotak and Shonali Nagrani	Appearances on the premier of the season to welcome housemates to the new house.
Launch Night	Akshay Kumar	promote his film Boss
Week 1	Shahid Kapoor and Ileana D'Cruz	appeared on the show to promote their film Phata Poster Nikhla Hero
Week 2	Anil Kapoor	Recur to patronize his reality TV series 24
Week 3	Drashti Dhami, Adhvik Mahajan, Shefali Sharma, Rashami Desai, Tina Datta & Sidharth Shukla	Special appearances from Colors shows
Week 4	Manish Paul	came inside the house to promote his film Mickey Virus
Week 4	Sharman Joshi and Jaaved Jaaferi	promote their film War Chhod Na Yaar
Week 5	Kangana Ranaut	promote her film Krrish 3
Week 6	Priyanka Chopra	promote her film Krrish 3
Week 7	Ali Asgar, Kiku Sharda, Rajev Paul & Delnaaz Irani	Special appearances
Week 7	Sania Mirza	Special appearances
Week 7	Lauren Gottlieb & Punit Pathak	Special appearances
Week 7	Ranveer Singh	promote his film Goliyon Ki Raasleela Ram-Leela
Week 8	Bharti Singh	Special appearance
Week 8	Sunny Deol	promote his film Singh Saab the Great
Week 9	Kareena Kapoor and Imran Khan	promote their film Gori Tere Pyaar Mein
Week 10	Arshad Warsi and Soha Ali Khan	promote their film Mr Joe B. Carvalho
Week 11	Anjana Kumar	To support her son Andy
Week 11	Nanda Panjabi	To support her daughter Kamya
Week 11	Nigaar Khan	To support her sister Gauahar
Week 11	Payal Rohatgi	To support her boyfriend Sangram
Week 11	Dolly Bindra	Special appearance
Week 11	Shahid Kapoor, Prabhu Deva and Sonakshi Sinha	promote their film R... Rajkumar
Week 12	Madhuri Dixit and Huma Qureshi	promote their film Dedh Ishqiya
Week 13	Sunny Leone and Sachiin J Joshi	came inside the house for the promotion of their upcoming film Jackpot
Week 13	Sohail Khan	promote his film Jai Ho
Week 13	Himansh Kohli, Rakul Preet Singh and Divya Khosla Kumar	promote their film Yaariyan
Week 14	Parineeti Chopra and Sidharth Malhotra	promote their film Hasee Toh Phasee on Bigg Boss
Week 15	Sanaya Irani, Ashish Sharma, Harshad Arora and Preetika Rao	promote their shows Rangrasiya and Beintehaa

== Nominations table ==
	Week 1	Week 2	Week 3	Week 4	Week 5	Week 6		Week 7	Week 8	Week 9	Week 10	Week 11	Week 12	Week 13	Week 14		Week 15		
	Week 1	Week 2	Week 3	Week 4	Week 5	Day 36	Day 38	Week 7	Week 8	Week 9	Week 10	Week 11	Week 12	Week 13	Day 91	Day 94	Day 97	Day 104	
Nominees for Captaincy	No; Captain	Andy; Tanishaa	Armaan; Tanishaa	Andy; Kamya; Sangram	Armaan; Asif; Elli; Gauahar; Kamya; Pratyusha; Tanishaa	Apurva; Armaan		Elli; Kushal	Ajaz; Armaan	Elli; Tanishaa	Andy; Pratyusha	Andy; Sofia	Andy; Gauahar	Ajaz; Andy; Armaan; Gauahar; Kamya; Kushal; Sangram; Sofia; Tanishaa	Andy; Kamya; Sangram		No; Captain		
House Captain	No; Captain	Tanishaa		Kamya	Gauahar	Apurva		Kushal	Armaan	Elli	~~Pratyusha~~; Kamya	Sofia	Gauahar	Andy	Sangram		No; Captain		
Captain's Nominations	No; Captain	Rajat	Shilpa; Armaan	Ratan	Kamya (to evict); Kushal (to save)	Asif	Asif; Elli	Kamya; Pratyusha; Apurva; Andy; Elli	Sangram (to evict)	Gauahar	Andy	Not eligible	Sangram	Not eligible	Tanishaa (to save)	Not eligible	No; Captain		
Vote to:	Evict		Save	Evict					Save	Evict				None	Evict	None		WIN	
Gauahar	Pratyusha; Ratan	Not eligible	Kushal; Sangram	Asif; Armaan	House; Captain	Tanishaa; Vivek	Asif; Elli	Not eligible	Kamya; Pratyusha	Andy; Tanishaa	Elli; Sangram; Sofia	Armaan; Tanishaa	House; Captain	No; Nominations	Armaan; Tanishaa	No; Nominations	No; Nominations	No; Nominations	Winner (Day 104)
Gauahar	Pratyusha; Ratan	Not eligible	Kushal; Sangram	Asif; Armaan	House; Captain	Tanishaa; Vivek	Asif; Elli	Walked (Day 44)	Kamya; Pratyusha	Andy; Tanishaa	Elli; Sangram; Sofia	Armaan; Tanishaa	House; Captain	No; Nominations	Armaan; Tanishaa	No; Nominations	No; Nominations	No; Nominations	Winner (Day 104)
Tanishaa	Ratan; Elli	House; Captain		Asif; Gauahar	Not eligible	Kamya; Pratyusha	Not eligible	Not eligible	Andy; Elli	Ajaz; Gauahar	Elli; Sangram; Sofia	Gauahar; Kamya	Sofia; Ajaz	No; Nominations	Gauahar; Kushal	No; Nominations	No; Nominations	No; Nominations	1st runner-up (Day 104)
Ajaz	Not In House							Caravan (Days 42–45)	Candy; Pratyusha	Armaan; Tanishaa	Armaan; Sofia; Tanishaa	Kushal; Tanishaa	Armaan; Tanishaa	No; Nominations	Andy; Kushal	No; Nominations	No; Nominations	No; Nominations	2nd runner-up (Day 104)
Sangram	Kamya; Kushal	Kamya; Pratyusha	Elli; Ratan	Apurva; Pratyusha	Pratyusha; Tanishaa	Pratyusha; Vivek	Asif; Kamya	Not eligible	Andy; Elli	Pratyusha; Tanishaa	Armaan; Sofia; Tanishaa	Kushal; Gauahar	Kushal; Sofia	No; Nominations	House; Captain		No; Nominations	No; Nominations	3rd runner-up (Day 104)
Andy	Elli; Kushal	Kamya; Pratyusha	Sangram; Shilpa	Apurva; Pratyusha	Armaan; Tanishaa	Tanishaa; Vivek	Not eligible	Caravan (Days 45–48)	Sangram; Sofia	Ajaz; Pratyusha	Elli; Gauahar; Sofia	Kushal, Kamya	Kushal; Sofia	House; Captain	Ajaz; Kushal	No; Nominations	No; Nominations	Evicted (Day 101)	
Armaan	Not eligible	Gauahar; Kushal	Kamya; Pratyusha	Asif; Kushal	Andy; Shilpa	Gauahar; Sangram	Asif; Kamya	Not eligible	House; Captain	Ajaz; Gauahar	Elli; Gauahar; Sofia	Kushal; Kamya	Ajaz; Kushal	No; Nominations	Gauahar; Kushal	No; Nominations	Evicted (Day 97)		
Armaan	Not eligible	Gauahar; Kushal	Kamya; Pratyusha	Asif; Kushal	Andy; Shilpa	Gauahar; Sangram	Asif; Kamya	Not eligible	House; Captain	Ajaz; Gauahar	Elli; Gauahar; Sofia	Kushal; Kamya	Secret Room (Days 77–78)	No; Nominations	Ejected (Day 94)	No; Nominations	Evicted (Day 97)		
Kushal	Not eligible	Not eligible	Gauahar; Apurva	Armaan; Asif	Pratyusha; Tanishaa	Tanishaa; Vivek	Asif; Elli	House; Captain	Ejected (Day 44)		Not eligible	Armaan; Ajaz	Andy; Armaan	No; Nominations	Ajaz; Tanishaa	Evicted (Day 95)			
Kamya	Not eligible	Not eligible	Armaan; Pratyusha	House; Captain	Kushal; Sangram	Sangram; Tanishaa	Not eligible	Not eligible	Pratyusha; Ajaz	Andy; Tanishaa	House; Captain	Armaan; Tanishaa	Andy; Tanishaa	No; Nominations	Evicted (Day 91)				
Sofia	Not In House							Caravan (Days 45–48)	Andy; Tanishaa	Ajaz; Pratyusha	Andy; Sofia; Tanishaa	House; Captain	Kushal; Andy	Evicted (Day 84)					
Elli	Not eligible	Not eligible	Ratan; Sangram	Armaan; Asif	Andy; Kushal	Kamya; Pratyusha	Not eligible	Not eligible	Andy; Sangram	House; Captain	Andy; Sofia; Tanishaa	Andy (to save)	Evicted (Day 70)						
Pratyusha	Not eligible	Not eligible	Armaan; Kamya	Andy; Sangram	Apurva; Shilpa	Sangram; Tanishaa	Asif, Elli	Not eligible	Elli; Kamya	Sangram; Sofia	Evicted (Day 63)								
Candy	Not In House							Caravan (Days 42–45)	Elli; Tanishaa	Kamya (to evict)	Evicted (Day 56)								
Apurva	Not eligible	Not eligible	Kushal; Shilpa	Andy; Pratyusha	Armaan; Tanishaa	House; Captain		Not eligible	Gauahar (to save)	Evicted (Day 49)									
Asif	Not In House		Anita; Armaan	Kushal; Elli	Kushal; Shilpa	Kushal; Pratyusha	Not eligible	Evicted (Day 42)											
Vivek	Not In House					Kushal; Pratyusha	Evicted (Day 38)												
Shilpa	Hazel; Kamya	Kamya; Pratyusha	Apurva; Kushal	Pratyusha; Sangram	Armaan; Tanishaa	Armaan (to evict)	Evicted (Day 35)												
Ratan	Not eligible	Not eligible	Apurva; Shilpa	Andy; Pratysuha	Evicted (Day 28)														
Anita	Elli; Hazel	Gauahar; Kushal	Apurva; Armaan	Tanishaa (to save)	Evicted (Day 21)														
Rajat	Kushal; Pratyusha	Gauahar; Kushal	Andy (to evict)	Evicted (Day 14)															
Hazel	Not eligible	Evicted (Day 7)																	
Notes	1	1, 2	3, 4	2,4,5,6	7,8	9	10,11	12,13	3	None									
Against public vote	Elli; Hazel; Kamya; Kushal; Pratyusha; Ratan	Gauahar; Kamya; Kushal; Pratyusha; Rajat	Andy; Anita; Asif; Elli; Gauahar	Andy; Armaan; Asif; Pratyusha; Ratan	Andy; Armaan; Kamya; ~~Kushal~~; Shilpa; Tanishaa	Armaan; Asif; Pratyusha; Tanishaa; Vivek	Asif; Elli; Kushal; Tanishaa	~~Andy~~; Apurva; Elli; Kamya; Pratyusha	Ajaz; Candy; Sangram; Sofia	Ajaz; Gauahar; Kamya; Pratyusha; Tanishaa	Andy; Ajaz; Elli; Sofia; Tanishaa	Armaan; Kamya; Kushal; Sangram; Tanishaa	Andy; Kushal; Sangram; Sofia	Ajaz; Armaan; Gauahar; Kamya; Kushal; Sangram; Tanishaa	Ajaz; Gauahar; Kushal	Andy; Armaan; Gauahar; Tanishaa	Andy; Ajaz; Gauahar; Sangram; Tanishaa	Ajaz; Gauahar; Sangram; Tanishaa	
Re-entered	None							Gauahar	None		Kushal	None				Armaan	None		
Caravan	None							Ajaz	None										
Caravan	None							Candy	None										
Caravan	None							Andy	None										
Caravan	None							Sofia	None										
Secret Room	None												Armaan	None					
Walked	None							Gauahar	None										
Ejected	None							Kushal	None						Armaan	None			
Evicted	Hazel	Rajat	Anita	Ratan	Shilpa	Vivek	Asif	Apurva	Candy	Pratyusha	Elli	No; Eviction	Sofia	Kamya	Kushal	Armaan	Andy	Sangram	Ajaz
Evicted	Hazel	Rajat	Anita	Ratan	Shilpa	Vivek	Asif	Apurva	Candy	Pratyusha	Elli	No; Eviction	Sofia	Kamya	Kushal	Armaan	Andy	Tanishaa	Gauahar

Color Key'

indicates that the housemate has been declared as the winner.
indicates that the housemate has been declared as the first runner-up.
indicates that the housemate has been declared as the second runner-up.
indicates the contestant has been evicted.
indicates the contestant has been walked out of the show.
indicates the housemate was ejected.
indicates that the housemate has re-entered the show.
indicates the House Captain.
indicates that the Housemate was directly nominated for eviction prior to the regular nominations process.
indicates that the person was saved by another housemate.
indicates that the housemate has been granted immunity from nominations.
indicates that the housemate was in the caravan or secret room.

=== Notes ===
- ^Note 1: Only the housemates living on the heaven side had the right to nominate. However they could only nominate housemates living on the hell side.
- ^Note 2: The captain was given a special power to nominate one heaven housemate which will place them directly up for eviction.
- ^Note 3: In a twist to nominations housemates were told to nominate two housemates they would like to save from eviction.
- ^Note 4: All the housemates held the right to nominate. Everyone except the house captain was subject to facing the public vote.
- ^Note 5: For week four captain nominations occur before the end of previous captaincy reign, as Tanishaa was moved to hell side and lost her captaincy ship according to rules.
- ^Note 6: All housemates had the right to nominate but they could only nominate housemates living on their side of the house.
- ^Note 7: Tanishaa was not eligible for voting as Ratan was given a special power upon her eviction by which she could select any member and deny them the right to nominate.
- ^Note 8: House captain held a special right to save one nominated housemate and replace him/her with another housemate who was not put up for eviction by the housemates that week.
- ^Note 9: Shilpa was given a special power to nominate one housemate which will place them directly up for eviction.
- ^Note 10: Due to the misbehaviour of Tanishaa towards Kushal in the luxury budget task, and Kushal trying to get out of the house, Bigg Boss nominated both of them.
- ^Note 11: The winning team in the luxury budget task and the captain had to nominate two people for eviction.
- ^Note 12: For week 7 nominations, Bigg Boss asked the captain to name five contestants who were discussing and plotting nominations which was a violation of Bigg Boss rule.
- ^Note 13: Out of the five the captain had to select one such person who discussed the most and he would be directly evicted at a later date.
