= Meethi Choori No 1 =

Indian reality show

- Genre: Reality game show
- Created by: SOL Productions
- Presented by: Jay Bhanushali; Shabir Ahluwalia
- Starring: Karishma Tanna; Ragini Khanna; Urvashi Dholakia; Rakshanda Khan; Sanaya Irani; Drashti Dhami; Rashami Desai
- Country of origin: India
- Original language: Hindi

Production
- Producers: Fazila Allana; Kamna Nirula Menezes
- Production company: SOL Productions

Original release
- Network: Imagine TV
- Release: 14 August – 16 October 2010

Meethi Choori No 1 is a 2010 Indian reality show aired on Imagine TV starring several Indian television actresses. It was produced by SOL Productions.

== Concept ==
The show was a chat show which includes 8 actresses, from among whom a few actresses are changed per episode. The show worked on a structure that followed a panel-based judgment ranking on the actresses' submitted videos or pictures about a particular subject (usually including s the sex appeal factor) and then the ladies were asked to rate their fellow contestants on a scale of 1 to 8 for a given question, where it was emphasized that "acquiring rank 1 is not a good deal here!". The same question was also held as a survey among 100 men and if the ranking of any of the actresses match with the survey ranking then she won Rs. 5 lakh.

== Episodes ==
The show had about 10 episodes, including a special episode with 8 married television actresses and another episode with contestants from reality show Rahul Dulhaniya Le Jayega. Every episode had eight participants.

== Hosts ==
Television actors Jay Bhanushali and Shabbir Ahluwalia hosted all the episodes.

== Participants ==
Many popular television actresses appeared on the show. While most of the actresses appeared once or twice, a handful of them appeared regularly like Urvashi Dholakia & Ragini Khanna.

- Urvashi Dholakia
- Rakshanda Khan
- Karishma Tanna
- Ragini Khanna
- Mona Singh
- Neha Marda
- Tanaaz Irani
- Rashami Desai
- Narayani Shastri
- Rupali Ganguly
- Kashmera Shah
- Shilpa Saklani
- Poonam Narula
- Roshni Chopra
- Ashita Dhawan
- Anmol Singh
- Pragati Mehra
- Tasneem Sheikh
- Yami Gautam
- Sukirti Kandpal
- Abigail Jain
- Pooja Gor
- Vibha Anand
- Nigaar Khan
- Keerti Gaekwad Kelkar
- Jaya Bhattacharya
- Sanaya Irani
- Gauri Pradhan
- Sriti Jha
- Parul Yadav
- Smriti Kalra
- Dimpy Ganguly
