= Bigg Boss Halla Bol =

Season of television series (2015)

- Presented by: Farah Khan
- No. of days: 28
- No. of housemates: 10
- Winner: Gautam Gulati
- Runner-up: Karishma Tanna
- No. of episodes: 29

Release
- Original network: Colors TV
- Original release: 3 January – 31 January 2015

Series chronology
- ← Previous; Season 8 Next → Season 9

Bigg Boss: Halla Bol is the spin-off of the Indian reality television show Bigg Boss. It was a merger of Bigg Boss 8 similarly to the concept adopted by the Ultimate Big Brother. Five contestants from previous seasons enters the house to compete with five regular entrants of the season 8 finale. Farah Khan hosted the new format of the show, as Salman bid adieu to the show because of his filming schedule of Bajrangi Bhaijaan.

The series was won by actor Gautam Gulati whilst actress Karishma Tanna emerged as the runner-up.

== Production ==
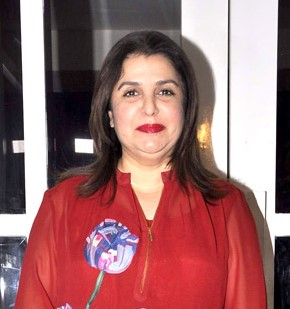
Farah Khan host of Bigg Boss 8, spin-off Bigg Boss Halla Bol.

In the fifteenth week Bigg Boss announced that show has been extended for four weeks and unlike previous seasons crowned its five champions on 3 January concluding season 8 finale, where spin-off Bigg Boss Halla Bol launched and merged with the regular season. The spin-off series officially launched on 4 January, with the five Halla Bol Challengers from previous seasons which includes Ajaz Khan, Sambhavna Seth, Mahek Chahal, Rahul Mahajan and Sana Khan. Sana's entrance was disclosed later as a fifth challenger by production team. Before the official announcement only Ajaz entered the house on Day 99. The new spin-off format of Champions and Challengers with ten contestants hosted by Farah Khan as contractually Salman bids adieu from the series concluding season finale. Confirming her participation Farah said:

"I have loved watching Bigg Boss and enjoy everything about it. The Bigg Boss Halla Bol Series is unlike anything that regular viewers of the show could have ever perceived. Salman Khan has been truly entertaining as a host with his affable style and quick wit. I am looking forward to building a unique experience for the viewers through this venture and hope they enjoy every bit of it."

— Farah Khan - Hindustan Times.

=== Ratings and viewership ===
The ratings held a record for an all-time low with the final only managing to score a TRP of 2.82 until Bigg Boss 15 finale aired grabbing a rating of only 1.9. The official tabulators for the show being Ernst & Young allegedly had formed the final result based on a number of votes which was not only less than the previous seasons but also the evictions for the same series. An additional statement released by the firm revealed that the percentage separating the final two contenders was lower than one whole unit indicating figurative comparison to a photo finish.

=== Broadcast syndication ===
Country	Network	Airing Date	Syndication Type	Source
India	Colors	21 September 2014	Off-Network; Syndication	
United Kingdom	Colors UK	21 September 2014	International Syndication	

=== Events overview ===
	Monday	Tuesday	Wednesday	Thursday	Friday	Saturday	Sunday
Event	Week 1 - Week 4						
Event	Nominations	luxury budget task		Highlights	Tabadla	Eviction and Interview	

== Housemates status ==
Sr	Housemate	Day entered	Day exited	Result
1	Gautam	Day 1	Day 133	Winner
2	Karishma	Day 1	Day 133	1st runner-up
3	Pritam	Day 1	Day 133	Walked, 2nd runner-up
4	Dimpy	Day 47	Day 133	3rd runner-up
5	Ali	Day 24	Day 133	4th runner-up
6	Sambhavana	Day 105	Day 129	Evicted
7	Rahul	Day 105	Day 126	Evicted
8	Mehak	Day 105	Day 122	Evicted
9	Sana	Day 105	Day 119	Evicted
10	Ajaz	Day 105	Day 106	Ejected

Notes

- Continuation of Bigg Boss 8

== Housemates ==
=== Champions ===
- Karishma Tanna is a television actress.
- Gautam Gulati is a television actor.
- Pritam Singh RJ is a radio jockey.
- Ali Quli Mirza is a singer
- Dimpy Ganguly is the winner of Season 2 of India's rendition of The Bachelor.

=== Challengers ===
Five challengers returned, as veterans for the title, from previous seasons. While two housemates were chosen from Season 2 and one from Season 5, 6 and 7 each. No inclusions were made from Season 1, 3 and 4.

- Ajaz Khan is an actor who finished in third place in season seven.
- Mahek Chahal is an actress and model who was a runner-up in the fifth season.
- Rahul Mahajan is an actor and the son of politician Pramod Mahajan. He quit the show in the second season.
- Sambhavna Seth is an actress and dancer and has appeared in Bhojpuri films. In the second season, she finished in tenth place.
- Sana Khan is an actress, model and dancer who participated in season six, finishing in third place.

== Guest appearances ==
Week(s)	Guest(s)	Notes
2	Mahesh Bhatt, Ali Fazal and Gurmeet Choudhary	To promote their film Khamoshiyan.
3	Mallika Sherawat	To promote her film Dirty Politics.
4	Janardhan Baba (in-house guest only)	
4	Ajaz Khan (in-house guest only)	He was ejected in first week due to violent behaviour against Ali.
Finale	Malaika Arora Khan	
Finale	Sonakshi Sinha	
Finale	Siddharth Nigam and his team	To promote their upcoming TV series Chakravartin Ashoka Samrat
Finale	Rohit Shetty, Hussain Kuwajerwala, Sana Khan & Aashish Chaudhary	To promote their upcoming TV series Khatron Ke Khiladi (season 6)
Finale	Rajat Sharma	

== Twists ==
=== Housemates allotment ===
Housemate	Week 1		Week 2		Week 3	Week 4
Housemate	Day 1	Day 4	Day 11	Day 12	Day 19	Day 25
Housemate	^{[1]}	^{[2]}	^{[3]}	^{[4]}	^{[5]}	^{[6]}
Gautam	Champion↔	Challenger↓			Champion↑	
Karishma	Champion↔			Challenger↓	Champion↑	
Pritam	Champion↔				Challenger↓	
Dimpy	Champion↔				Challenger↓	
Ali	Champion↔		Challenger↓		Champion↑	
Sambhavna	Challenger↔		Champion↑		Challenger↓	
Rahul	Challenger↔				Champion↑	
Mahek	Challenger↔			Champion↑		
Sana	Challenger↔	Champion↑				
Ajaz	Challenger↔					

1. Five contestants from previous seasons entered the house as the challengers against the five remaining finalists of Season 8.
2. On the basis of their performance in the luxury budget task, Mahek was upgraded to the champion level while Gautam was downgraded to the challenger level. Both of them were selected by their respective teams as the best and worst performer respectively.
3. On the basis of their performance in the luxury budget task, Sambhavna was upgraded to the champion level while Dimpy was downgraded to the challenger level. Sambhavna chose herself for the best performer while the captain, Karishma chose Dimpy as the worst performer.
4. Challengers chose Tabadla as Luxury Budget over Food where Sana was upgraded as Champion and Karishma was downgraded as Challenger. Both of them were selected by Challengers.
5. Challengers win the task given by Bigg Boss. As a result, the challengers were upgraded as champions team and the champions were made the challengers.
6. Sambhavna gets eliminated from the house and the remaining housemates are declared as finalists.

== Weekly summary ==
The main events in the house are summarized in the table below. A typical week begins with nominations, followed by the shopping task, and then the eviction of a Housemate during the Saturday episode. Evictions, tasks, and other events for a particular week are noted in order of sequence.

Week 1	Entrances	On Day 1, Challengers and ex contestants Ajaz, Mahek, Rahul, Sambhavna and Sana entered the Bigg Boss 8 house
Week 1	Nominations	On Day 1, Champions including Gautam, Karishma, Pritam, Ali & Dimpy could only nominate three people from the challengers team including Ajaz, Mahek, Rahul, Sambhavna & Sana. The housemates who were nominated at the end were Sambhavna, Ajaz and Mahek.
Week 1	Tasks	Yeh Tera Ghar Yeh Mera Ghar: On Day 2, the housemates were split into two teams. One was champions and the other challengers. Champions are in house from many weeks, they have more right on house then challengers, Bigg Boss is giving a chance to challengers to claim right on parts of house. Challengers will challenge champions for every part of house. There will be tasks for every part of house, the team who wins that task will get that part of house, at end of luxury budget task, the team which has won more parts of house will win the task, then the losing team member will have to take permission to winning team to go in that won part of house and have to take visitor's pass from them, in start bedroom, living area, bathroom, kitchen are under champions, garden is of both champions and challengers. there is a task for the garden first. There are two trees in garden. The red one is for challengers and green is for champions. Both teams have to protect fruits on their tree from the other tree and have to try to steal fruits from other's tree at same time. At the end of the task, the team which has more fruit will win the garden.
Week 1	Result	Won – Champions
Week 1	Reward	The champions had won over the Living Area and Restrooms while the challengers have won over the Kitchen and Bedrooms.
Week 1	Exit	On Day 2, Ajaz was ejected from the house after he hit Ali. On Day 7, there was no eviction as it was cancelled.
Week 2
Week 2	Nominations	On Day 8, one champion will have to nominate three challengers by cutting their balloon. Sambhavana, Sana and Rahul were nominated.
Week 2	Tasks	Bigg Boss Call Center: Champions will be call center employees while challengers will call them and can ask any question which they want, it can personal or related to house too, challengers can say anything to champions but champions have to sweetly answer them, challengers will try to break patience of champions, challengers will try to provoke to champions that they end call before 10mins or answer challengers back which will not go in their favor. Upen will be in challenger's team. Karishma will be part of champions, as captain she will be head of call center and will judge task too.
Week 2	Result	Won – Challengers
Week 2	Reward	Ali became capitain of the house.
Week 2	Exits	On Day 14, Sana was evicted from the house after facing the public vote.

== Nominations table ==
For previous details on the voting history, prior to the 'Halla Bol!' merger, see; Bigg Boss 8#Voting history from week 1 to week 15.

	Week 16	Week 17	Week 18		Week 19		
	Week 16	Week 17	Day 120	Day 123	Day 127	Day 133	
Nominees for Captaincy	No; Captain	Karishma; Pritam	Pritam; Ali; Sambhavna	None		No; Captain	
House Captain	No; Captain	Karishma	Ali	Pritam		No; Captain	
Captain's Nominations	No; Captain	Rahul; Sambhavna; Sana	Rahul; Dimpy	Gautam	Karishma; Dimpy	No; Captain	
Challengers	Sambhavna; Rahul; Sana; Mahek; Ajaz	Gautam; Sambhavna; Mahek; Rahul	Ali; Gautam; Mahek; Rahul	Karishma; Ali; Gautam; Rahul	Pritam; Dimpy; Sambhavna	Pritam; Dimpy; Sambhavna	None
Champions	Gautam; Ali; Pritam; Karishma; Dimpy	Sana; Ali; Pritam; Karishma; Dimpy	Sambhavna; Pritam; Karishma; Dimpy	Mahek; Sambhavna; Pritam; Dimpy	Gautam; Karihsma; Ali; Rahul	Gautam; Karishma; Ali	None
Vote to:	Evict			Save	Evict	WIN	
Gautam	Ajaz; Sambhavna; Mahek	Not eligible	Karishma; Dimpy	Karishma	Ali; Sambhavna	No; Nominations	Winner (Day 133)
Karishma	Sambhavna; Ajaz; Sana	House; Captain	Gautam; Dimpy	Ali (to evict)	Ali; Pritam	Nominated	1st runner-up (Day 133)
Pritam	Sambhavna; Ajaz; Mahek	Sambhavna; Sana; Rahul	Karishma; Dimpy	House; Captain		No; Nominations	Walked, 2nd runner-up (Day 133)
Dimpy	Mahek; Ajaz; Sambhavna	Rahul; Sana; Sambhavna	Karishma; Pritam	Rahul	Sambhavna; Pritam	No; Nominations	3rd runner-up (Day 133)
Ali	Ajaz; Sambhavna; Mahek	Rahul; Sana; Sambhavna	House; Captain	Gautam	Gautam; Karishma	No; Nominations	4th runner-up (Day 133)
Sambhavna	Not eligible	Not eligible	Karishma; Pritam	Karishma	Gautam; Dimpy	Evicted (Day 129)	
Rahul	Not eligible	Not eligible	Karishma; Pritam	Dimpy	Evicted (Day 126)		
Mahek	Not eligible	Gautam; Sambhavna; Sana	Karishma; Sambhavna	Evicted (Day 122)			
Sana	Not eligible	Not eligible	Mahek (to evict)	Evicted (Day 119)			
Ajaz	Ejected (Day 106)						
Notes	1,2,3	3	4	5	6	7	
Against Public Vote	Ajaz; Mahek; Sambhavna	Rahul; Sana; Sambhavna	Mahek; Karishma; Dimpy; Pritam	Ali; Dimpy; Rahul; Sambhavna	Ali; Dimpy; Gautam; Karishma; Pritam; Sambhavna	Ali; Dimpy; Gautam; Karishma; Pritam	
Ejected	Ajaz	None					
Evicted	Eviction cancelled	Sana	Mahek	Rahul	Sambhavna	Ali	Dimpy
Evicted	Eviction cancelled	Sana	Mahek	Rahul	Sambhavna	Pritam	
Evicted	Eviction cancelled	Sana	Mahek	Rahul	Sambhavna	Karishma	Gautam

indicates that the Housemate was directly nominated for eviction prior to the regular nominations process.
indicates that the Housemate was granted immunity from nominations.

- ^1: Ajaz entered the house before Season 8 finale on Day 99, but credited as a Halla Bol Challenger, his presence for seven days didn't affect any change.
- ^2: On Day 1, Housemates nominated face to face, with each Housemate nominating three people as opposed to the usual two. Following Ajaz's ejection, the eviction scheduled to take place on Day 7 was cancelled.
- ^3: Housemates with the 'Challenger' status were not eligible to vote. Housemates with the 'Champion' status were immune from nominations and held the right to vote.
- ^4: Mehek was nominated by Sana via her "Bigg Bomb" after her eviction.
- ^5: Pritam was given immunity from nominations for winning the luxury task. Karishma was given a special power to directly nominate a contestant for eviction, which she had earned by voluntarily walking out of the luxury budget task in order to get this power. She chose Ali.
- ^6: All contestants were asked to give two names for nominations but from the opposite team only.
- ^7: All 5 finalists were automatically placed in the nominations.
