= Ratan Ka Rishta =

- Also known as: Swayamvar Season 3 - Ratan Ka Rishta
- Created by: SOL
- Country of origin: India
- Original language: Hindi
- No. of episodes: total 31

Production
- Cinematography: Surindra Rao
- Running time: 45 minutes

Original release
- Network: Imagine TV
- Release: 30 May – 3 July 2011

Ratan Ka Rishta, also known as Swayamvar Season 3, was a marriage reality television show in India on Imagine TV. It was the third season of the Swayamvar series after Swayamwar and Rakhi Ka Swayamwar. The bride of the season was Ratan Raajputh. It premiered on 30 May 2011.

A mobile video game based on the television show was released by UTV Indiagames, titled Ratan Ka Rishta.

== Winner ==
Abhinav Sharma, a Software Engineer from Uttranchal won the show. The couple got engaged in 2011 but broke off their engagement due to numerous incompatibilities, including long-distance issues and differing priorities.

== Contestants ==
1. Pardeep Babbar
2. Anupam Singh Kushwah- finalist
3. Abhimanyu Singh
4. Abhinav Sharma- Winner
5. Rohit Mittal
6. Deepak Pandit- finalist
7. Gaurav Jaggi
8. Pankaj Soni
9. Rohit Jain
10. Suresh Tumula
11. Rahul Wahal
12. Syed Shoaib Hussain Sabri
13. Ritesh Jaiswal
14. Sudhanshu Tiwari
15. Kunal Madhivala

== Guests ==
The Following were the Guests that visited Ratan Ka Rishta:

- Dolly Bindra
- Ram Kapoor
- Sudesh Berry
- Sushmita Mukherjee
- Ali Asgar
- Rakshanda Khan
- Ragini Khanna
- Mona Singh
- Sunil Grover
- Rashmi Desai
- Nandish Sandhu
- Rakhi Sawant
- Rahul Mahajan
- Dimpy Mahajan
- Supriya Kumari
- Supriya Pilgaonkar
- Sachin Pilgaonkar
- T.P. Sinha
