= Mona Singh =

Indian actress (born 1981)

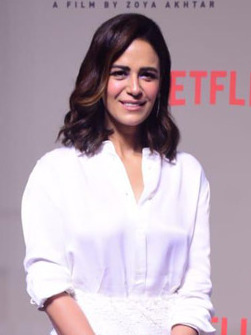
- Singh in 2023
- Born: 8 October 1981 (age 44); Chandigarh, India
- Occupation: Actress
- Years active: 2003–present
- Spouse: Shyam Rajagopalan (m. 2019)

Mona Singh (pronounced [ˈmoːnaː sɪŋɡʱ]; born 8 October 1981) is an Indian actress who works in Hindi films and series. Singh is recognised for her role in the soap opera Jassi Jaissi Koi Nahin (2003–2006). She is the recipient of two ITA Awards and one Filmfare OTT Award.

Singh is known for participating and winning the first season of the reality series Jhalak Dikhhla Jaa, and for playing Mona Chopra in Kya Huaa Tera Vaada, Preet Singh in Pyaar Ko Ho Jaane Do, and Paridhi Bundela in Kavach... Kaali Shaktiyon Se. She made her film debut with a supporting role in Rajkumar Hirani's comedy-drama 3 Idiots (2009), which ranks as one of the highest-grossing Indian films of all time. Singh expanded to web with Kehne Ko Humsafar Hain (2018) and earned praises for Yeh Meri Family (2018) and Made in Heaven (2023).

== Life and family ==
Mona Singh was born on 8 October 1981 in a Sikh family in Chandigarh.

== Career ==
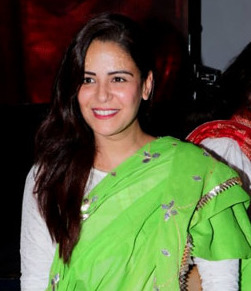
Singh celebrates Janmashtami at ISKCON in Juhu

=== Television career ===
Singh first appeared on Hindi television with Sony Entertainment Television's soap opera Jassi Jaissi Koi Nahin (2003–2006). The show made her a household name, and she won awards such as Apsara Awards, Indian Telly Awards and Indian Television Academy Awards.

In 2006, she participated in and won the first season of the reality show Jhalak Dikhhla Jaa. She hosted Femina Miss India and the second season of Jhalak Dikhhla Jaa in 2007, followed by her win in Ek Khiladi Ek Haseena in 2008.

Singh then teamed up with Ekta Kapoor's banner Balaji Telefilms for the first of four consecutive fiction show collaborations in NDTV Imagine's Radhaa Ki Betiyaan Kuch Kar Dikhayengi where she was cast as Raunaq Makhija from 2008 to 2009. She hosted Entertainment Ke Liye Kuch Bhi Karega (2009), Jhalak Dikhhla Jaa 4 (2010), Shaadi 3 Crore Ki (2010), Star Ya Rockstar (2011) and CID Veerta Awards (2012) and was a participant on Meethi Choori No 1 (2010).

By returning to fiction shows, she entered Sony Entertainment Television's Kya Huaa Tera Vaada, produced by Kapoor, in 2012 as Mona, a wife whom her husband leaves and divorces due to an extramarital affair with his former girlfriend. The show ended in 2013, and she took a break from television afterwards also.

Two years later, Singh made a comeback to television in October 2015 with Pyaar Ko Ho Jaane Do, her third consecutive show to be produced by Kapoor where she played Preet Singh, a woman who lost her parents. Due to low ratings, Pyaar Ko Ho Jaane Do went off air within three months in January 2016. Later, in 2016, she featured in Kapoor's supernatural production Kavach...Kaali Shaktiyon Se as Paridhi, a married woman attempting to protect her husband from his former lover who has turned into a spirit post death and arrived to haunt the couple, and hosted Comedy Nights Bachao.

In September 2021, she hosted the &TV's show Mauka-E-Vardaat.

=== Web series career ===
In 2018, Singh ventured into web world with her portrayal of Ananya in Kehne Ko Humsafar Hain. That year she also starred in The Viral Fever and Netflix series Yeh Meri Family. In 2019, she was seen in ZEE5 and ALT Balaji series Mission Over Mars. She next appeared in Black Widows on ZEE5.

In 2023, Singh appeared in the Zoya Akhtar created Made In Heaven as Bulbul Jauhari. Singh played the role of an auditor attempting to bring the company out of debt whilst simultaneously handling a police case against her son. She received critical acclaim for her role from critics and audiences alike. Singh next appeared in a brief but pivotal role as a doctor in Netflix's Kaala Paani. Her performance was well received by critics.

In 2025, she starred in a supporting role in The Ba***ds of Bollywood. In 2026, she appeared in a leading role in the second season of the series Kohrra. Her performance was praised by The Hindu's Anuj Kumar writing, "As a grieving mother in a police uniform, Mona Singh, is a powerhouse ready to implode."

=== Film career ===
Singh made her film debut in 2009 with the supporting character of Mona Sahastrabuddhe in Rajkumar Hirani's Hindi satirical comedy 3 Idiots, which became one of the highest grossing Indian films with a global accumulation of about ₹4 billion (US$42 million). She next appeared in Utt Pataang, Zed Plus and Amavas.

In 2022, she appeared in Aamir Khan’s Laal Singh Chaddha, where she played the protagonist’s mother. Despite being 16 years younger than Khan, Singh defended her role and stated, "I’m not playing Aamir Khan’s mother, I’m playing Laal’s mother."

In 2026, Singh appeared in the films Happy Patel: Khatarnak Jasoos, Border 2, and Subedaar.

== Media image ==
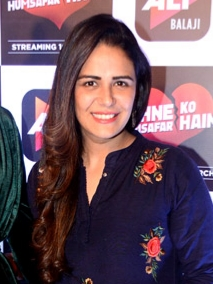
Singh at an event in 2018

With her performances in Jassi Jaissi Koi Nahin, Singh established herself as a highly regarded actress in Hindi television. In 2012, Singh appeared in Forbes India's Celebrity 100 list, ranking 97th with an estimated annual income of ₹22.5 million (US$230,000).

== Filmography ==
Key
†	Denotes films that have not yet been released

=== Films ===
Year	Title	Role	Notes	Ref.
2009	3 Idiots	Mona Sahastrabuddhe		
2011	Utt Pataang	Koel Datta		
2014	Zed Plus	Hameeda		
2019	Amavas	Dr. Shivani		
2019	Ek Choti Si Ego	Priya	Short film	
2022	Don Bhaisahab	Rekha Anand		
2022	Laal Singh Chaddha	Gurpreet Kaur Chaddha		
2022	Ek Chup	Dr Radhika	Short film	
2024	Munjya	Pammi		
2026	Happy Patel: Khatarnak Jasoos	Mama		
2026	Border 2	Simi Kaler		
2026	Subedaar	Babli Didi		

=== Television ===
Year	Title	Role	Notes	Ref.
2003–2006	Jassi Jaissi Koi Nahin	Jasmeet Walia Suri / Jessica Bedi / Neha Shastri		
2006	Jhalak Dikhhla Jaa 1	Contestant	Winner	
2007	Femina Miss India	Host		
2007	Jhalak Dikhhla Jaa 2	Host		
2008	Ek Khiladi Ek Haseena	Contestant	Winner	
2008–2009	Radhaa Ki Betiyaan Kuch Kar Dikhayengi	Raunaq Kapoor		
2009–2014	Entertainment Ke Liye Kuch Bhi Karega 1	Host		
2010	Jhalak Dikhhla Jaa 4	Host		
2010	Meethi Choori No 1	Contestant		
2010	Shaadi 3 Crore Ki	Host		
2011	Ratan Ka Rishta	Herself	Guest	
2011	Star Ya Rockstar	Host		
2012	CID Veerta Awards	Host		
2012–2013	Kya Huaa Tera Vaada	Mona Chopra		
2015	Itna Karo Na Mujhe Pyaar	Herself	Guest appearance	
2015–2016	Pyaar Ko Ho Jaane Do	Preet Singh Hooda		
2016	Kavach...Kaali Shaktiyon Se	Paridhi "Pari" Bundela		
2015–2016	Comedy Nights Bachao Taaza	Host		
2021	Mauka-E-Vardaat	Host		
2022	Pushpa Impossible	Advocate Damini Mehra		

=== Web series ===
Year	Title	Role	Notes	Ref.
2018	Yeh Meri Family	Poorva Gupta	Season 1	
2018–2020	Kehne Ko Humsafar Hain	Ananya Sharma Mehra	3 seasons	
2019	M.O.M. - Mission Over Mars	Moushmi Ghosh		
2020	Black Widows	Veera Mehrotra		
2023	Kafas	Seema Vashisht		
2023	Made in Heaven	Bulbul Jauhari	Season 2	
2023	Kaala Paani	Dr. Soudamini Singh		
2025	Mistry	ACP Sehmat Siddiqui		
2025	The Ba***ds of Bollywood	Neeta Singh		
2025	Thode Door Thode Paas	Simran Mehta	Season 1	
2026	Kohrra	SI Dhanwant Kaur	Season 2	
2026	Maa Ka Sum	Vinita	Completed	
2026	Pritam and Pedro	Stacy Gonsalves		
TBA	Paan Parda Zarda †	TBA	Completed	

== Awards and nominations ==
Year	Award	Category	Work	Result	Ref.
2003	Producers Guild Film Awards	Best Actress in a Drama Series	Jassi Jaissi Koi Nahin	Won	
2003	Producers Guild Film Awards	Outstanding Debut	Jassi Jaissi Koi Nahin	Won	
2004	Indian Telly Awards	Best Television Personality of the Year	Jassi Jaissi Koi Nahin	Won	
2004	Indian Telly Awards	Best Actress in a Lead Role	Jassi Jaissi Koi Nahin	Won	
2004	Indian Television Academy Awards	Best Actress –Popular	Jassi Jaissi Koi Nahin	Won	
2005	Indian Telly Awards	Best Actress in a Lead Role	Jassi Jaissi Koi Nahin	Won	
2005	Indian Television Academy Awards	Best Actress –Drama	Jassi Jaissi Koi Nahin	Won	
2024	Filmfare OTT Awards	Best Supporting Actress – Drama Series	Made in Heaven 2	Won	
2024	Bollywood Hungama Style Icons	Most Stylish Mould-Breaking Talent of the Year	—N/a	Nominated	

== See also ==
- List of Indian film actresses
- List of Indian television actresses
- List of Hindi television actresses
