= Swayamvar (TV series) =

Indian reality show

- Created by: SOL
- Directed by: Gagan deep bijraniya
- Presented by: Ram Kapoor (2009-2010); Hiten Tejwani (2011)
- Starring: Rakhi Sawant (2009); Rahul Mahajan (2010); Ratan Rajput (2011); Veena Malik (cancelled)
- Country of origin: India
- No. of seasons: 4

Production
- Production locations: Fateh Garh Palace, Udaipur (2009-2010); Shiv Vilas Palace, Jaipur (2011)
- Cinematography: Surindra rao Asst nitesh choudhary
- Running time: Approx. 45 minutes
- Production company: Imagine TV

Original release
- Network: Imagine TV
- Release: 29 June 2009 – 3 July 2011

Swayamvar is a reality television show, where the contestants perform tasks and woo the hopeful bride/groom in return for their hand in marriage.

It started airing in India with the Swayamvar Season 1 in 2009 and followed that with Swayamvar Season 2 (2010). In February 2011, Imagine TV announced the launch of the Swayamvar Season 3. The Swayamvar Season 3 started airing on Imagine TV from 30 May 2011. The winner of Ratan Ka Rishta will get the bride/groom of the season's hand in marriage. The new series sees a new host and a new location for the show. The new host is television actor, Hiten Tejwani, while the new location for the TV show is Shiv Vilas Palace in Jaipur, Rajasthan.

== Hosts ==
- Ram Kapoor - Season 1 and 2 (2009–2010), also appeared in Season 3 as a part-time host, whenever Hiten Tejwani was unable to appear for the show.
- Hiten Tejwani - Season 3 (2011)

== Prospective Bride/Groom ==
- Rakhi Sawant - Season 1 (2009)
- Rahul Mahajan - Season 2 (2010)
- Ratan Rajput - Season 3 (2011)
- Veena Malik - Season 4 (Cancelled as the channel got shut)

== Season 1 ==
The winner of the first season of Swayamvar was Elesh Parujanwala, from Toronto, Ontario, Canada. The season was aired from 29 June 2009 to 2 August 2009. Manas Katyal and Chitiz Jain of New Delhi were the two other finalists, while Manmohan Tiwari of Rishikesh and Luv Khanna of New Delhi came 4th and 5th respectively, in the competition.

The prospective bride for Swayamvar Season 1 was Bollywood dancer, actress, model and talk show host Rakhi Sawant. The first season was hosted by Ram Kapoor.

This was the only season where the winner did not marry the prospective bride. They got engaged during the finale and later split up after a couple of months. Rakhi Sawant later went on to host the highly controversial show Rakhi Ka Insaaf, while Elesh Parujanwala went on to appear in another highly controversial show, Pati Patni Aur Woh, alongside his then partner, Rakhi Sawant.

Manas Katyal, one of the finalists, went on to appear as a contestant on Zor Ka Jhatka: Total Wipeout, while Manmohan Tiwari went on to become a television actor and starred in many shows and TV serials including Armanon Ka Balidaan-Aarakshan and Jamunia.

== Season 2 ==
The winner of the second season of Swayamvar was Dimpy Ganguly from Kolkata. This season was aired from February to April 2010. Nikunj Malik of Faridabad and Harpreet Chabra of New Delhi were the 2 other finalists.

The prospective groom for Swayamvar Season 2 was reality TV personality and the son of Pramod Mahajan, Rahul Mahajan. The second season was also hosted by Ram Kapoor.

Dimpy Ganguly, the winner of the show, later, went on to become a contestant of Zor Ka Jhatka: Total Wipeout. She was eliminated in the first round of the show. Rahul Mahajan has gone on to appear in the hit reality show Comedy Circus. Both of them appeared in Bigg Boss 8 spin-off Halla Bol after separation to spice things up

Nikunj Malik, one of the finalists, went on to become an actress and has appeared in many TV shows including Geet (TV series).

== Season 3 ==
The winner was announced in the final episode entitled "Faisle Ki Raat". The prospective bride for Swayamvar Season 3 was Ratan Rajput. Abhinav Sharma was her fiancé. The couple haven't married. The relationship has since fallen apart.

== Season 4 ==
The promo for season 4 titled Swayamvar Veena ka Vivah were out but the show never went on floor as the channel was shut down. Pakistani actress Veena Malik was signed up for her Swayamvar.

== About the prospective brides/grooms ==
=== Rakhi Sawant ===
Rakhi Sawant was the prospective bride of the first season. After the show, she caused huge controversy by splitting with the winner of the show, Elesh Parujanwala. She is a dancer and actress, who has appeared in such films as Main Hoon Na and Dil Bole Hadippa!. She has also appeared in reality shows such as Nach Baliye and Bigg Boss. She is also very well known as the host of controversial chat show Rakhi Ka Insaaf. This show became prominent when a participant committed suicide after Rakhi had made comments about him, which made him lose his self-confidence.

=== Rahul Mahajan ===
Rahul Mahajan was the prospective groom in the second season of Swayamvar (Rahul Dulhaniya Le Jayega). Following the show, his newlywed wife, Dimpy Mahajan, publicly accused him of physical abuse. He was previously married to Shweta Singh, whom he divorced in 2008 following similar domestic abuse allegations.

The son of the late politician, Pramod Mahajan, Rahul first came into public prominence following his father's death in 2006. He has since appeared on several reality television shows, including Bigg Boss and Comedy Circus.

=== Ratan Rajput ===
Ratan Rajput was the prospective bride of the third season. She is a television actress, who has appeared in many shows including Radhaa Ki Betiyaan Kuch Kar Dikhayengi and Agle Janam Mohe Bitiya Hi Kijo. Ratan recently announced her breakup with Abhinav.
