= Diandra Soares =

Indian model and television personality

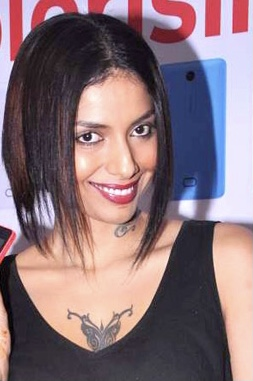
- Soares in 2013
- Born: Bandra, Mumbai, India
- Occupations: Model fashion designer, television host
- Television: Bigg Boss 8

Diandra Soares is an Indian model, fashion designer and television host. She is mostly famous for her bold looks on the ramp. She was a contestant in the reality show Bigg Boss 8 in 2014.

== Early life ==
Soares was born to a middle-class family in Bandra, Maharashtra. Her family never had any relation with the modelling world. After having schooling at Bombay, she pursued her education from St. Xaviers. Madhu Sapre was the former Indian model who inspired Soares in modelling.

== Personal life ==
Diandra was in a relationship with Gautam Gulati during her stay inside the Bigg Boss house.

== Modelling career ==
Soares has been active in the field of modelling since the age of 16. Her first assignment was for Tips and Toes and her first show was for McDowell's. In 1995, she was crowned as Miss Bombay, and that helped her to get contracts from various leading brands like Dinesh Suitings, VIP Lingeries, Tillsbury whiskey. She has walked for many international fashion shows in her career which were conducted by Gucci, Leonard Paris, Emanuel Ungaro, Sonia Rykiel, and Miami Fashion Show.

In 1999, Soares appeared on the runway with a shaved head at a fashion show in Goa. The unconventional appearance initially affected her modelling opportunities, with some fashion shows declining to feature her. However, subsequently Soares was noted for her bald looks on the ramp. Designers opened and closed the shows with Soares in the Lakme Fashion Week. In August 2013, she shaved her head again. Soares commented that it was done for religious reasons and by going bald she felt spiritually empowered. She also added that her bald head might prevent her entry to many fashion weeks. She once again shaved her head during her session in Big Boss 8.

== Footwear design and styling ==
In addition to modelling, Soares worked as a footwear designer. She designed footwear for a Tarun Tahiliani presentation at India Fashion Week and subsequently created shoes for a collection by designers Falguni and Shane Peacock. She also worked on styling for the Kingfisher Calendars for 2004 and 2005. In 2005, she was reported to be planning her own label, 2di4.

== Media career ==
Soares was a contestant in the popular celebrity stunt show Fear Factor: Khatron Ke Khiladi in its 4th season in 2011. She became one of the popular contestants and survived to the end and became the second runner up. Soares became a contestant on the Indian TV reality show Bigg Boss in its eighth season which started airing in September 2014 on Colors. She was evicted after 12 weeks on 14 December 2014 (Day 84). In 2016, Diandra made a web series called 'Do It Like Diandra'. The web series focused on her style from makeup to accessories

== Television ==
Year	Name	Role	Notes	Ref
2008	Get Gorgeous 5	Judge		
2011	Fear Factor: Khatron Ke Khiladi 4	Contestant	Finalist (2nd runner up)	
2012	Jhalak Dikhhla Jaa 5	Guest	To support Shibani Dandekar	
2013	Life Mein Ek Baar	Contestant	Along with Rochelle Rao	
2014	Bigg Boss 8	Contestant	Evicted Day 84	
2015	Farah Ki Dawat	Contestant	Along with Ajaz Khan & Sambhavna Seth	
2015	Killerr Karaoke Atka Toh Latkah	Contestant	Along with Sana Khan, Sara Khan & Mahek Chahal	
2016	Bigg Boss 10	Guest	Along with Aamir Ali	
2016	Love, Life & Screw Ups!!!	Mansi	Appeared for 3 episodes	

== Web ==
Year	Name	Role	Notes
2017	Alisha	Alfia Romani	Episodic role
2020	X Zone	Lisa	--
2021	Lights! Camera! Murder!		on MX Player

== Movies ==
Year	Title	Role	Notes
2002	Everybody Says I'm Fine!	Anita	---
2008	Fashion	Herself	Cameo Appearance
