= Bigg Boss (Hindi TV series) season 8 =

Indian reality show (2014)

Bigg Boss
- Season 8
- Logo for the eighth season of Bigg Boss.
- Presented by: Salman Khan
- No. of days: 104
- No. of housemates: 19
- Champions: Karishma Tanna; Pritam Singh RJ; Gautam Gulati; Ali Quli Mirza; Dimpy Ganguly

Release
- Original network: Colors TV
- Original release: 21 September 2014 – 3 January 2015

Season chronology
- ← Previous; Season 7 Next → Halla Bol

Bigg Boss 8 (also known as Bigg Boss 8: Sabki Lagegi Vaat), which merged into Bigg Boss Halla Bol, was the eighth season of the Indian reality television series Bigg Boss, which premiered on TV channel Colors from 21 September 2014 and concluded on 3 January 2015 with five final contestants. Bigg Boss is the Indian edition of Big Brother. Salman Khan returned as the host of the series for the fifth time and Snapdeal was chosen to be the new presenting sponsor after the end of Colors' five-year deal with Vodafone India for the series.

After the finale of season with five champions, Bigg Boss Halla Bol a spin-off was launched on 4 January. It merged with the regular series and continued in the same house. Five contestants from previous seasons entered the house to compete with five crowned regular entrants of the season finale. Farah Khan became the new host as Salman bid adieu due to his filming schedule of Bajrangi Bhaijaan.

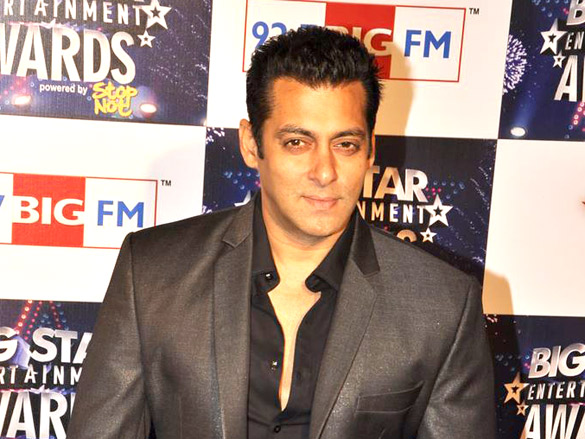
Salman Khan remained the host of the series for the 4th time.

== Broadcast ==
The series premiered in India on network Colors on 21 September 2014. The series was also broadcast in Pakistan on ARY Digital beginning 28 September 2014, and was additionally broadcast in the United Kingdom on Colors UK beginning 21 September 2014.

== Production ==
=== House theme ===
The house for the eighth season was in Lonavala. It resembled the interior of an aircraft. After the first eviction, the house was made available to the housemates. The physical layout of the house remained mostly unchanged from the previous series. However, the house theme was changed to an Alpine chalet with wood, fur and leather furnishings.

=== Secret society ===
On launch night, it was revealed that there was a place adjacent to the 'Plane crash' area known as 'The Secret Society.' Later, Deepshika, Pritam and Puneet were chosen by Bigg Boss to become cult celebrities who would live in the society in secret, away from the rest of the housemates. It was then announced that they would have the power to nominate housemates of their choice to face the first public vote and have immunity from nomination. On day 3, the secret society revealed itself to the viewers as per Bigg Boss' order and introduced themselves. On Day 5, Puneet was moved to plane crash area and later on Day 8 the other two secret society members Deepshika and Pritam joined him.

=== Bigg Boss Halla Bol ===
In the fifteenth week Bigg Boss announced that show had been extended for four weeks and, unlike previous seasons, crowned its five champions on 3 January, concluding season 8 finale, where spin-off Bigg Boss Halla Bol launched and merged with the regular season.

The spin-off series officially launched on 4 January, with the five Halla Bol Challengers from previous seasons, which includes Ajaz Khan, Sambhavna Seth, Mahek Chahal, Rahul Mahajan and Sana Khan. Sana Khan's entrance was disclosed later as a fifth challenger by production team. Before the official announcement, only Ajaz Khan entered the house on Day 99. The new spin-off format of Champions and Challengers with ten contestants was hosted by Farah Khan as contractually, Salman Khan leaves the series after season finale.

== Housemates status ==
| Sr | Housemate | Day entered | Day exited | Status |
|---|---|---|---|---|
| 1 | Karishma | Day 1 | Day 104 | Champion |
| 2 | Dimpy | Day 47 | Day 104 | Champion |
| 3 | Ali | Day 24 | Day 104 | Champion |
| 4 | Gautam | Day 1 | Day 104 | Champion |
| 5 | Pritam | Day 1 | Day 104 | Champion |
| 6 | Puneet | Day 1 | Day 44 | Ejected |
| 6 | Puneet | Day 46 | Day 104 | Evicted |
| 7 | Sonali | Day 1 | Day 7 | Evicted |
| 7 | Sonali | Day 11 | Day 104 | Evicted |
| 8 | Upen | Day 1 | Day 101 | Evicted |
| 9 | Praneet | Day 1 | Day 90 | Evicted |
| 10 | Diandra | Day 1 | Day 84 | Evicted |
| 11 | Renee | Day 47 | Day 70 | Evicted |
| 12 | Nigaar | Day 50 | Day 63 | Evicted |
| 13 | Aarya | Day 1 | Day 56 | Evicted |
| 14 | Sushant | Day 1 | Day 49 | Evicted |
| 15 | Minissha | Day 1 | Day 42 | Evicted |
| 16 | Soni | Day 1 | Day 35 | Evicted |
| 17 | Natasa | Day 1 | Day 28 | Evicted |
| 18 | Deepshikha | Day 1 | Day 21 | Evicted |
| 19 | Sukirti | Day 1 | Day 14 | Evicted |
| 20 | Sargun | Day 1 | | Evicted |

- : Diandra re-entered the house as a guest on day 100.

== Housemates ==
The participants in the order of appearance and entered in house are:

=== Original entrants ===
- Karishma Tanna - Model and actress. She is known for acting in the show Kyunki Saas Bhi Kabhi Bahu Thi and film Grand Masti.
- Sonali Raut - Model and film actress. She was earlier seen in the film The Xpose.
- Upen Patel - Model and film actor from London. Upen has been in numerous Bollywood films such as 36 China Town and Ajab Prem Ki Ghazab Kahani.
- Soni Singh - Television actress She has appeared in shows like Mann Kee Awaaz Pratigya and Saraswatichandra.
- Arya Babbar - Bollywood and Punjabi film actor Arya was seen in many films like Tees Maar Khan and Jatts In Golmaal. He is the son of Raj Babbar.
- Diandra Soares - Model, anchor and fashion designer She is known for participating in Fear Factor: Khatron Ke Khiladi 4.
- Sushant Divgikar - Model, TV anchor and pageant contestant He is the winner and represented India at Mr Gay World 2014.
- Gautam Gulati - Television actor He is known for his roles in Tujh Sang Preet Lagayi Sajana and Diya Aur Baati Hum.
- Sukirti Kandpal - Television actress and model. She is known for her roles playing as Dr Riddhima Gupta in Dill Mill Gayye and the romantic drama Pyaar Kii Ye Ek Kahaani.
- Praneet Bhat - TV actor Praneet seen in shows like Geet - Hui Sabse Parayi and Iss Pyaar Ko Kya Naam Doon?. He was last seen in Mahabharat as Shakuni.
- Natasa Stankovic - Model and Bollywood Actress from Serbia. She is known for appearing in the Bollywood film Satyagraha in an item song 'Aiyo Ji'.
- Minissha Lamba - Bollywood Actress She has appeared in films like Yahaan and Bachna Ae Haseeno.
- Deepshikha Nagpal - Actress She was last seen in Madhubala – Ek Ishq Ek Junoon. She has also participated in Nach Baliye with her husband Keshav Arora.
- Puneet Issar - Bollywood / Punjabi actor and director He is known for acting in Mahabharat
- Pritam Singh - RJ. He is known for his show Bhabhi Ji.

=== Not-selected housemates ===
- Sargun Mehta — Actress and model. She is known for playing Ganga in Balika Vadhu and participating in Nach Baliye 5.

=== Wild card entrants ===
- Ali Quli Mirza - Singer. He is known for singing the song 'Bura Bura' from the film Bluffmaster!.
- Renee Dhyani - Model. She is known for participating in MTV Roadies.
- Dimpy Ganguly - Model and actress. She is the winner of Season 2 of India's rendition of The Bachelor. She has acted in shows Tujh Sang Preet Lagayi Sajana and Yeh Rishta Kya Kehlata Hai.
- Nigaar Khan - Indian television actress mainly known for her portrayal of negative roles. She is known for acting in Kasamh Se.

== Twists ==
=== Potential housemates ===
| Housemates | Status |
|---|---|
| Sargun Mehta | Not Selected |
| Sukriti Kandpal | Selected |

=== Housemates allotment ===
| Housemate | Week 1 | | | Week 2 | | Week 3 |
| Housemate | Day 1 | Day 5 | Day 7 | Day 10 | Day 11 | Day 12 |
|---|---|---|---|---|---|---|
| Housemate | ^{[1]} | ^{[2]} | ^{[3]} | ^{[4]} | ^{[5]} | ^{[6]} |
| Aarya | Plane Crash | | | Main House | | Plane crash theme ended |
| Deepshikha | Secret Society | | Plane Crash | Main House | | Plane crash theme ended |
| Diandra | Plane Crash | | | Main House | | Plane crash theme ended |
| Gautam | Plane Crash | | | Main House | | Plane crash theme ended |
| Karishma | Plane Crash | | | Main House | | Plane crash theme ended |
| Minissha | Plane Crash | | | Main House | | Plane crash theme ended |
| Natasa | Plane Crash | | | Main House | | Plane crash theme ended |
| Praneet | Plane Crash | | | Main House | | Plane crash theme ended |
| Pritam | Secret Society | | Plane Crash | Main House | | Plane crash theme ended |
| Puneet | Secret Society | Plane Crash | | Main House | | Plane crash theme ended |
| Soni | Plane Crash | | | Main House | | Plane crash theme ended |
| Sonali | Plane Crash | | | Main House | | Plane crash theme ended |
| Sushant | Plane Crash | | | Main House | | Plane crash theme ended |
| Upen | Plane Crash | | | Main House | | Plane crash theme ended |
| Sukirti | Plane Crash | | | Main House | | |

1. : The house area allotment was chosen by Bigg Boss.
2. : Puneet was moved to the Plane Crash area as a result of the unanimous decision taken by all three members of the Secret Society as per Bigg Boss' order. They were to select the member who wasn't eligible for the society anymore.
3. : Deepshika and Pritam were moved to the 'Plane Crash' area following Sonali's eviction interview.
4. : As a result of winning the Hijack task Deepshika and her team were moved to the main house. Bigg Boss also later moved Praneet's team to the main house as a result of their impressive performance in the task.
5. : Sonali entered the main house via the confession room after the housemates were done nominating.
6. : Plane crash theme ended with all housemates inside the main house.

== Nomination table ==
| | Week 1 | | Week 2 | Week 3 | Week 4 | Week 5 | Week 6 | Week 7 | Week 8 | Week 9 | Week 10 | Week 11 | Week 12 | Week 13 | Week 14 | Week 15 | | | | |
| | Day 1 | Day 4 | Week 2 | Week 3 | Week 4 | Week 5 | Week 6 | Week 7 | Week 8 | Week 9 | Week 10 | Week 11 | Week 12 | Week 13 | Week 14 | Day 102 | Day 104 | | | |
|---|---|---|---|---|---|---|---|---|---|---|---|---|---|---|---|---|---|---|---|---|
| Nominees for Captaincy | No; Captain | | | | | — | — | Gautam; Upen | Diandra; Pritam | Dimpy; Gautam; Praneet; Pritam | Karishma; Puneet; Upen | Dimpy; Karishma; Pritam; Praneet; Renee; Sonali | Karishma; Pritam | Ali; Diandra; Dimpy; Gautam; Karishma; Praneet; Pritam; Puneet; Sonali; Upen | Dimpy; Praneet; Sonali | Ali; Sonali | No; Captain | | | |
| House Captain | No; Captain | | | | | Ali | | Upen | Diandra | Gautam | Puneet | ~~Renee~~; Pritam | Karishma | Dimpy | ~~Praneet~~; Sonali | Ali | No; Captain | | | |
| Captain's Nominations | No; Captain | | | | | Sushant | Sonali; Praneet | Praneet; Gautam; Sonali; Pritam; Puneet | Puneet; Gautam | Puneet; Ali (to save) | Praneet (to evict) | Ali; Diandra; Dimpy; Karishma; Puneet | Not eligible | Upen | Karishma | Not eligible | No; Captain | | | |
| Secret Society | N/A | Deepshikha | Secret Society Ended | | | | | | | | | | | | | | | | | |
| Secret Society | N/A | Pritam | Secret Society Ended | | | | | | | | | | | | | | | | | |
| Secret Society | N/A | Puneet | Secret Society Ended | | | | | | | | | | | | | | | | | |
| Society's Nomination | N/A | Sonali; Gautam | Secret Society Ended | | | | | | | | | | | | | | | | | |
| Vote to: | None | Evict | | | Save | Evict | | | | | Save | Evict | None | Evict | | None | Championship | | | |
| Karishma | In House | Natasa; Sukirti | Gautam; Praneet; Pritam | Gautam; Sonali | Sushant | Sonali; Praneet | Puneet; Gautam | Sonali; Puneet | Puneet; Gautam | Dimpy; Sonali | Diandra | Not eligible | House; Captain | Pritam | Pritam; Ali | No; Nominations | No; Nominations | Champion (Day 104) | | |
| Dimpy | Not In House | | | | | | | | Aarya; Karishma | Sonali; Karishma; Nigaar | Gautam | Not eligible | No; Nominations | House; Captain | Ali; Pritam | No; Nominations | No; Nominations | Champion (Day 104) | | |
| Ali | Not In House | | | | | House; Captain | | Sonali; Praneet | Karishma; Aarya | Sonali; Karishma; Nigaar | Diandra | Not eligible | No; Nominations | Karishma | Dimpy; Upen | House; Captain | No; Nominations | Champion (Day 104) | | |
| Gautam | In House | Sukirti; Praneet | Banned | Karishma; Aarya | Praneet | Soni; Minissha | Aarya; Diandra | Sonali; Praneet | Karishma; Upen | House; Captain | Pritam | Not eligible | No; Nominations | Ali | Upen; Karishma | No; Nominations | No; Nominations | Champion (Day 104) | | |
| Pritam | Not In House | Secret; Society | Gautam; Puneet; Praneet | Deepshikha; Diandra | Sushant | Aarya; Minissha | Karishma; Upen | Puneet; Sonali | Karishma; Aarya | Dimpy; Sonali; Karishma; Nigaar | Praneet | House; Captain | No; Nominations | Karishma | Dimpy; Karishma | No; Nominations | No; Nominations | Champion (Day 104) | | |
| Puneet | Not In House | Secret; Society | Gautam; Karishma; Pritam | Deepshikha; Minnisha | Praneet | Minissha; Soni | Aarya; Minissha | Praneet; Sonali | Banned | Sonali; Karishma | House; Captain | Not eligible | No; Nominations | Pritam | Dimpy; Upen | No; Nominations | No; Nominations | Evicted (Day 104) | | |
| Puneet | Not In House | Secret; Society | Gautam; Karishma; Pritam | Deepshikha; Minnisha | Praneet | Minissha; Soni | Aarya; Minissha | Ejected (Day 44) | Banned | Sonali; Karishma | House; Captain | Not eligible | No; Nominations | Pritam | Dimpy; Upen | No; Nominations | No; Nominations | Evicted (Day 104) | | |
| Sonali | In House | Diandra; Aarya | Evicted (Day 7) Sukirti | Aarya; Deepshikha | Praneet | Soni; Aarya | Minissha; Karishma | Puneet; Gautam | Karishma; Aarya | Karishma; Nigaar | Praneet | Not eligible | No; Nominations | Karishma | House; Captain | No; Nominations | No; Nominations | Evicted (Day 104) | | |
| Upen | In House | Sukirti; Natasa | Gautam; Praneet; Pritam | Pritam; Sonali | Soni | Minissha; Sonali | Puneet; Gautam | House; Captain | Puneet; Aarya | Dimpy | Karishma | Not eligible | No; Nominations | Ali | Ali; Pritam | No; Nominations | Evicted (Day 101) | | | |
| Praneet | Not In House | Diandra; Sukirti | Gautam; Diandra; Karishma | Minnisha; Deepshikha | Puneet | Soni; Minissha | Aarya; Minissha | Gautam; Pritam | Upen; Aarya | Dimpy; Karishma; Nigaar | Dimpy | Not eligible | No; Nominations | Karishma | Evicted (Day 90) | | | | | |
| Diandra | In House | Sonali; Praneet | Gautam; Praneet; Pritam | Gautam; Pritam | Upen | Sonali; Gautam | Gautam; Puneet | Gautam; Pritam | House; Captain | Dimpy; Sonali | Karishma | Not eligible | No; Nominations | Evicted (Day 84) | | | | | | |
| Renee | Not In House | | | | | | | | Karishma; Aarya | Dimpy; Sonali | Pritam | Evicted (Day 70) | | | | | | | | |
| Nigaar | Not In House | | | | | | | | | Dimpy | Upen (to evict) | Evicted (Day 63) | | | | | | | | |
| Aarya | In House | Sonali; Natasa | Gautam; Praneet; Soni | Sonali; Gautam | Banned | Sonali; Puneet | Puneet; Gautam | Sonali; Praneet | Puneet; Gautam | Evicted (Day 56) | | | | | | | | | | |
| Sushant | In House | Aarya; Gautam | Gautam; Pritam; Praneet | Gautam; Pritam | Upen | Gautam; Praneet | Minissha; Gautam | Gautam; Puneet | Evicted (Day 49) | | | | | | | | | | | |
| Minissha | Not In House | Natasa; Sonali | Gautam; Pritam; Praneet | Aarya; Karishma | Natasa | Gautam; Praneet | Puneet; Gautam | Evicted (Day 42) | | | | | | | | | | | | |
| Soni | In House | Natasa; Sonali | Diandra; Gautam; Aarya | Gautam; Aarya | Upen | Gautam; Sonali | Evicted (Day 35) | | | | | | | | | | | | | |
| Natasa | Not In House | Sukirti; Karishma | Gautam; Pritam; Diandra | Sonali; Pritam | Sushant | Evicted (Day 28) | | | | | | | | | | | | | | |
| Deepshikha | Not In House | Secret; Society | Gautam; Soni; Praneet | Sonali; Gautam | Evicted (Day 21) | | | | | | | | | | | | | | | |
| Sukirti | Selected | Natasa; Praneet | Gautam; Praneet; Pritam | Evicted (Day 14) | | | | | | | | | | | | | | | | |
| Sargun | Not Selected | Evicted (Day 1) | | | | | | | | | | | | | | | | | | |
| Notes | 1 | 2,3 | 4,5 | None | 6 | 7,8,9 | 8 | 10,11,12 | 8,13,14 | 15,16 | 8,17 | 18,19,20 | 17,21 | 17,22 | 23,24 | 25,26 | 27 | | | |
| Against public vote | Sargun; Sukirti | Gautam; Natasa; Sonali; Sukirti | Gautam; Praneet; Sukirti | Aarya; Deepshikha; Gautam; Pritam; Sonali | Aarya; Diandra; Gautam; Karishma; Minissha; Natasa; Pritam; Puneet; Soni | Diandra; Gautam; Minissha; Pritam; Sonali; Soni; Sushant | Gautam; Minissha; Praneet; Puneet; Sonali | Ali; Gautam; Praneet; Puneet; Sonali; Sushant | Aarya; Gautam; Karishma; Puneet | Dimpy; Karishma; Nigaar; Sonali | Ali; Praneet; Renee; Sonali; Upen | Ali; Diandra; Dimpy; Karishma; Puneet; Sonali | Ali; Diandra; Dimpy; Gautam; Praneet; Pritam; Puneet; Sonali; Upen | Karishma; Praneet; Sonali; Upen | Ali; Dimpy; Karishma; Pritam; Sonali; Upen | Ali; Dimpy; Karishma; Pritam; Sonali; Upen | Ali; Dimpy; Gautam; Karishma; Pritam; Puneet; Sonali | | | |
| Ejected | None | | | | | | | Puneet | None | | | | | | | | | | | |
| Re-entered | None | | Sonali | None | | | | Puneet | None | | | | | | | | | | | |
| Evicted | Sargun | Sonali | Sukirti | Deepshikha | Natasa | Soni | Minissha | Sushant | Aarya | Nigaar | Renee | No; Eviction | Diandra | Praneet | Eviction postponed | Upen | Sonali | Karishma | Dimpy | |
| Evicted | Sargun | Sonali | Sukirti | Deepshikha | Natasa | Soni | Minissha | Sushant | Aarya | Nigaar | Renee | No; Eviction | Diandra | Praneet | Eviction postponed | Upen | Puneet | Gautam | Pritam | Ali |

Color Key'

indicates that the housemate has been declared as the winner.
indicates that the housemate has been declared as the first runner-up.
indicates that the housemate has been declared as the second runner-up.
indicates the contestant has been evicted.
indicates the contestant has been walked out of the show.
indicates the housemate was ejected.
indicates that the housemate has re-entered the show.
indicates that the housemate is a part of the secret society gang.
indicates the house captain.
indicates that the housemate was directly nominated for eviction prior to the regular nominations process.
indicates that the person was saved by another housemate.
indicates that the housemate has been granted immunity from nominations.

=== Notes ===
- ^1: On the grand premiere, Gautam had to select one from Sargun and Sukirti to enter the house with him. He chose to select Sukirti while Sargun was evicted from the show straight away.
- ^2: This housemate was the current member of Secret Society and could not be nominated for eviction through the standard nomination process that week. Their identity was hidden from non-members.
- ^3: Deepshika, Puneet and Pritam being chosen by Bigg Boss as members of the secret society had to unanimously decide who would face the public vote. This process occurred after the housemates were done nominating. After accessing the results of the standard nominations the trio chose Sonali and Gautam.
- ^4: Bigg Boss took away Gautam's right to nominate as a result of him verbally abusing Karishma during the 'Hijack' challenge.
- ^5: Sukirti was nominated by Sonali via her "Bigg Bomb" after her eviction.
- ^6: Bigg Boss took away Aarya's right to nominate as a result of him taking off the mic and throwing it into the pool. Aarya was also straightaway nominated for being the captain of the losing team of 'Babbars vs Lambas' task.
- ^7: Bigg Boss nominated Diandra for her violent aggression towards Sonali.
- ^8: Pritam was nominated as a result for being the captain of the losing team of 'Heroes VS Villains' task.
- ^9: The captain was given a special power to nominate one or more housemates which would place them directly up for eviction.
- ^10: Bigg Boss nominated Ali as a result of him indecently touching Sonali against her will and liking.
- ^11: Sushant was nominated as a result of failing the 'Phonebooth' task.
- ^12: Housemates could only choose two housemates for nomination between the five nominated by Captain Upen. Housemates not chosen by the captain were hence rendered immune.
- ^13: Puneet was banned from the nomination process for being in the jail.
- ^14: Dimpy and Renee were made immune to nominations as per Bigg Boss' orders..
- ^15: The captain was given a special power to save one or more housemates from nominations.
- ^16: Apart from Ali, Gautam and Puneet, rest of the housemates had to unanimously decide on four nominees to evict.
- ^17: Upen was nominated by Nigaar via her "Bigg Bomb" after her eviction.
- ^18: Bigg Boss nominated Sonali for the rest of the season for her violent aggression towards Ali.
- ^19: House Captain Pritam was asked to nominate five housemates directly for eviction and due to this other housemates were not eligible to nominate anyone.
- ^20: Voting lines were not applicable this week and due to this no housemates were evicted.
- ^21: Bigg Boss nominated every housemate except Captain Karishma for breaking the rules of the house and therefore no housemates were eligible for nominating anyone including Captain Karishma.
- ^22: Karishma nominated Praneet as the punishment during the judgement day.
- ^23: Though Sonali is the captain of the house this week, but she was not given immunity from eviction. Therefore, she was nominated this week.
- ^24: Though voting lines were open this week, no housemates were evicted as it was Salman Khan's birthday week.
- ^25: As, no eviction held previous week the same nominees were forwarded to this week.
- ^26: Upen was evicted amidst a midnight/surprise eviction. He got evicted combining the public votes received in previous week and this week.
- ^27: Bigg Boss season 8 finale was concluded which saw a unique format, Sonali and Puneet gets eliminated while five contestants crowned as a winner for season 8, and moved them to season spin-off Bigg Boss Halla Bol! with five challengers from previous seasons.

This season featured a 'Special Panel', where a team of past housemates or their acquaintances would share their and public's views and opinions of the current housemates before the eviction. The panel would rotate every week.

== Guest appearances ==
| Week(s) | Guest(s) | Notes |
|---|---|---|
| Grand premiere | Elli Avram | Special appearances to introduce contestants Upen and Aarya |
| Grand premiere | Armaan Kohli | Special appearances to introduce contestants Upen and Aarya |
| Grand premiere | Nadira Babbar, Juhi Babbar and Prateik Babbar | To support Aarya |
| Grand premiere | Sunil Grover | To introduce contestant Diandra |
| Grand premiere | Sargun Mehta | To introduce Gautam and Sukirti |
| 1 | Shahid Kapoor and Shraddha Kapoor | Appeared on the show to promote their film Haider |
| 2 | Kamya Punjabi and Andy Kumar | Special appearance |
| 3 | Hrithik Roshan | To promote his film Bang Bang! |
| 3 | Rekha | To promote her film Super Nani |
| 4 | Gauahar Khan and Sargun Mehta | Special appearance |
| 5 | Sunil Grover and Kiku Sharda (as Gutthi and Palak) | Special appearances for Diwali celebrations |
| 5 | Mouni Roy and Punit Pathak | Special appearances for Diwali celebrations |
| 5 | Harshad Arora, Preetika Rao, Mrunal Jain, Tina Datta, Sumit Bhardwaj, Sonal Vengurlekar and Radhika Madan | Special appearances for Diwali celebrations |
| 5 | Sajid-Wajid | Special appearances |
| 5 | Urvashi Dholakia | Special appearances |
| 6 | Ali Zafar, Govinda, Parineeti Chopra and Ranveer Singh | To promote their film Kill Dil |
| 7 | Lisa Haydon | To promote her film The Shaukeens |
| 7 | Satyajit Padhye | Special appearances |
| 7 | Sophie Choudry | Special appearances |
| 8 | Arjun Kapoor | To promote his film Tevar |
| 9 | Arpita Khan and Aayush Sharma | To meet Salman Khan |
| 10 | Ujjwala Raut | To interact with her sister Sonali via phone call |
| 10 | Anurag Gulati | To meet her son Gautam |
| 10 | Amanjot Kaur | To meet her husband Pritam |
| 10 | Gauri Sandhu | To meet her boyfriend Ali |
| 10 | Sonakshi Sinha | To promote her film Action Jackson |
| 11 | Varun Dhawan | To promote his film Badlapur |
| 12 | Sonam Kapoor and Arbaaz Khan | To promote their film Dolly Ki Doli |
| 13 | Shilpa Saklani | Special appearance |
| 14 | Kapil Sharma, Navjot Singh Sidhu, Ali Asgar, Upasana Singh, Sunil Grover and Kiku Sharda (in-house guest only) | Comedy Nights with Kapil's cast members |
| 15 | Deepali Issar | To meet her husband Puneet |
| 15 | Diandra Soares | Special appearance |
| 15 | Mohit Gulati | To meet his brother Gautam |
| 15 | Jasmina Tanna | To meet her daughter Karishma |
| 15 | Arjun Rampal and Jacqueline Fernandez | To promote their film Roy |
