= Rakhi Ka Swayamwar =

- Promotional logo
- Directed by: Arif Shamsi
- Country of origin: India
- Original language: Hindi

Production
- Cinematography: Surinder Rao
- Running time: approx. 54 minutes

Original release
- Network: NDTV Imagine
- Release: 29 June – 2 August 2009

Related
- Rahul Dulhaniya Le Jayega; Ratan Ka Rishta

Rakhi Ka Swayamwar was a reality show broadcast on NDTV Imagine. The show started on 29 June 2009 and ended on 2 August 2009. The premise of the show centered on Bollywood actress and entertainer, Rakhi Sawant, in search for a groom to wed. It was hosted by Bollywood actor Ram Kapoor. The show was filmed at various locations in Udaipur.

In the final episode ("Faisle Ki Raat") held on 2 August 2009, Sawant selected Elesh Parujanwala, a Canadian businessman from Toronto, as her future bridegroom from among the three finalists. Although the show's original premise was that the couple would marry immediately, they decided in favour of postponing their marriage for an indefinite period.

On 28 July 2009, a Jaipur judge lodged an FIR against Sawant and several NDTV executives in response to a claim by writer Gaurav Tiwari that the channel stole the idea for a swayamvar-based reality show from his website. Season 2 of the reality programme, titled Rahul Dulhaniya le Jayega, featuring Rahul Mahajan as the groom looking for a bride concluded on 6 March 2010 where he wed Dimpy Ganguly on live national television. The third season of the reality show was called Ratan Ka Rishta and it featured Indian television actress Ratan Rajput who was looking for a groom. The third season concluded on 3 July 2011, when Ratan was engaged to Abhinav Sharma.

== Contestants ==
Name	Age	Hometown	Job	Eliminated
Elesh Parujanwala	30	Toronto, Canada	NRI Businessman	Winner
Manas Katyal	22	New Delhi	Media Professional	Finalist
Chitiz Jain	26	New Delhi	Fashion Designer & Businessman	Finalist
Manmohan Tiwari	25	Rishikesh	Lawyer & Theatre Actor	21 July
Luv Khanna	26	New Delhi	Model	17 July
Ashwin Chaudhuri	28	Nagpur	Marriage Bureau Owner	15 July
Raman Handa	26	Saharanpur	Astrologer & Vastu Consultant	13 July
Kapil Mathur	28	Jaipur	Retail Manager	10 July
Atirek Sharma	24	Kanpur	Actor	9 July
Pranav Damle	26	Mumbai	Mechanical Engineer	3 July
Raj Kripal Singh	27	Mumbai	Stuntman	3 July
Ather Parwez	33	Srinagar	Policeman	3 July
Ali Bana	30	Mumbai	Choreographer	1 July
Deepak Raghav	25	Bulandshahr	Fitness Trainer	30 June
Rishi Dwivedi	22	Lucknow	Professional Dancer	30 June
Aman Talwar	21	Faridabad	Student	30 June

== After "Faisle Ki Raat" ==
Originally, the winner of the show was going to marry in the final episode. But, when Rakhi did not feel ready to get married, she and Elesh got engaged during the final episode entitled "Faisle Ki Raat". After the show, It was reported that the couple were happy and had agreed to do a show called Pati Patni Aur Woh. It was during this show, that their relationship went downhill. They split up after the show because Elesh wanted Rakhi to quit her job as a Bollywood dancer and settle in Canada with him. After the split, many news and magazines reported that it was predecided that Rakhi had done the show for money and that Elesh did the show for publicity.
