= Ek Khiladi Ek Haseena (TV series) =

- Genre: Reality
- Presented by: Sandhya Mridul
- Judges: Sushmita Sen; Wasim Akram
- Country of origin: India
- Original language: Hindi
- No. of seasons: 1
- No. of episodes: 10

Production
- Camera setup: Multi-camera
- Running time: 52 minutes

Original release
- Network: Colors TV
- Release: 26 September – 25 October 2008

Ek Khiladi Ek Haseena (transl. A Player, A Beautiful Woman) is an Indian reality TV dance series broadcast on Colors TV in 2008. The series was hosted by Sandhya Mridul and judged by Sushmita Sen and former Pakistani cricketer Wasim Akram.

== Concept ==
The show was a reality dance contest with six couples as the participants. Each couple consisted of one Indian cricketer and one movie celebrity. The first season was won by Harbhajan Singh and Mona Singh.

== Contestants ==
- Pair 1: S. Sreesanth and Surveen Chawla
- Pair 2: Harbhajan Singh and Mona Singh (Winners)
- Pair 3: Irfan Pathan and Ashima Bhalla
- Pair 4: Dinesh Karthik and Nigaar Khan
- Pair 5: Nikhil Chopra and Barkha Bisht
- Pair 6: Vinod Kambli and Shama Sikander
