= Welcome – Baazi Mehmaan Nawazi Ki =

- Intertitle of "Welcome – Baazi Mehmaan Nawazi Ki".
- Genre: Cooking
- Starring: Sanaya Irani; Karanvir Bohra; Sara Khan; Gizele Thakral; Adaa Khan; Rakhi Sawant; Dimpy Ganguli; Renee Dhyani
- Narrated by: Ram Kapoor
- Country of origin: India
- Original language: Hindi
- No. of seasons: 2
- No. of episodes: 54

Production
- Producer: Miditech Pvt. Ltd.
- Production locations: Mumbai, India
- Camera setup: Multi-camera
- Running time: Approx. 22 minutes

Original release
- Network: Life OK
- Release: 21 January 2013 – May 2014

Welcome – Baazi Mehmaan Nawazi Ki is an Indian reality television series broadcast on Life OK. The series premiered on 21 January 2013. A second season aired in April to May 2014.

== Overview ==
The show is an Indian version of the international series Come Dine with Me. Each week a group of five contestants takes turns to act as host, cooking a three-course meal and entertaining the other four. At the end of the evening the guests give an overall score to reflect their enjoyment of the evening. The contestants of the first season of Welcome were Indian celebrities, but in the second season were applicants drawn from the general public. Unlike the original Come Dine With Me, Welcome has an on-screen host - television actor Ram Kapoor - in addition to an off-screen narrator.

== Contestants ==
Week		Premiered	Location	Contestants				
1	1-6	21 January 2013	Mumbai	Sanaya Irani	Ragini Khanna	VJ Andy	Nigaar Khan	Manoj Tiwari
2	7-12	28 January 2013	Mumbai	Amar Upadhyay	Dimpy Ganguli	Debina Bonnerjee	Karanvir Bohra	Gizele Thakral
3	13-18	4 February 2013	Mumbai	Sara Khan	Anupam Shyam	Aman Verma	Nauheed Cyrusi	Vindu Dara Singh/ ~~Ali Merchant~~
4	19-24	11 February 2013	Mumbai	Aanchal Munjal	Rucha Gujrati	Aishwarya Sakhuja	Tannaz Irani	Sayantani Ghosh
5	25-30	18 February 2013	Mumbai	Anchal Sabharwal	Sangram Singh	Chetan Hansraj	Madhura Naik	Rakhi Sawant
6	31-36	25 February 2013	Mumbai	Dimple Jhangiani	Mitali Nag	Bakhtiyaar Irani	Mauli Dave	Pritam Singh
7	37-42	4 March 2013	Mumbai	Payal Rohatgi	Sambhavna Seth	Amit Tandon	Aryan Vaid	Pavitra Punia
8	43-48	11 March 2013	Mumbai	Delnaaz Irani	Kushal Punjabi	Shilpa Saklani	Sofia Hayat	Rahul Mahajan
9	49-54	18 March 2013	Mumbai	Gurucharan Singh	Pooja Misrra	Aditi Gowitrikar	Manish Goel	Anmol Singh
