= Karishma Tanna =

Indian actress, model and host (born 1983)

Karishma K Tanna
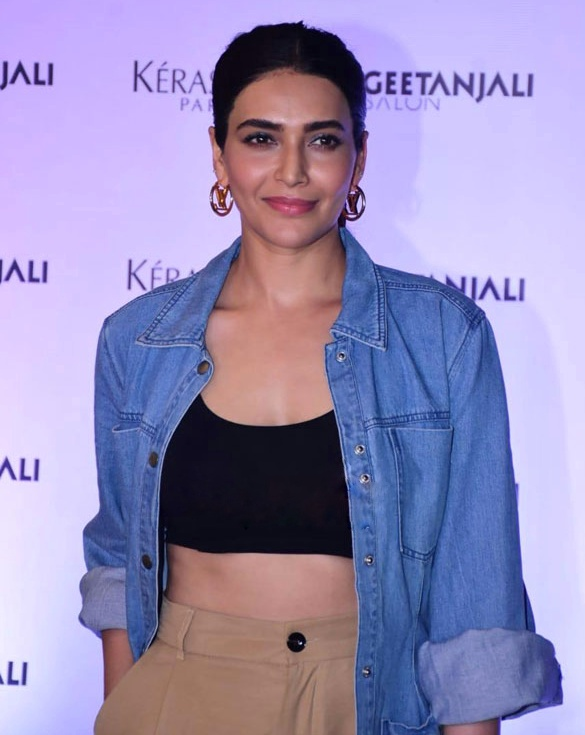
- Tanna in 2022
- Born: 21 December 1983 (age 42); Mumbai, Maharashtra, India
- Occupations: Actress; model; host
- Years active: 2001–present
- Spouse: Varun Bangera (m. 2022)

Karishma K. Tanna (born 21 December 1983) is an Indian actress and model who predominantly works in Hindi films and television shows. She made her television debut with Kyunki Saas Bhi Kabhi Bahu Thi in 2001. She is well known for her roles in Paalkhi, Naagin 3 and Qayamat Ki Raat. She was a contestant on the reality show Bigg Boss 8 in 2014, where she emerged as the 1st runner-up. In 2020, she participated in Fear Factor: Khatron Ke Khiladi 10 and emerged as the winner.

Tanna made her film debut as Nandini Thapar with Suneel Darshan's Dosti: Friends Forever (2006). She debuted in lead role through the 2011 Kannada movie I Am Sorry Mathe Banni Preethsona. In 2013, she was seen in Indra Kumar's successful comedy Grand Masti. In 2018, she featured in Rajkumar Hirani's biopic of Sanjay Dutt titled Sanju. The same year, she entered the digital world with ALT Balaji's web series Karrle Tu Bhi Mohabbat as Zoya Hussain. She gained further critical accolades in Hansal Mehta's Netflix TV series Scoop (2023).

== Early life ==
Tanna was born on 21 December 1983 to a Gujarati family in Mumbai, India.

She studied at Sydenham College of Commerce and Economics, Mumbai, where she developed an interest in acting and performances.

== Career ==
=== 2001–2013: Early work and television career ===
Tanna first appeared in Balaji Telefilms' soap opera Kyunki Saas Bhi Kabhi Bahu Thi where she played the role of Indu. She then appeared in the show Kahi To Milenge.

Tanna played the female lead in the TV series Kkoi Dil Mein Hai as Krutika. She later appeared in Ek Ladki Anjaani Si playing the negative role of Ayesha. Tanna made her Hindi film debut in Dosti: Friends Forever (2005), playing Nandini Thapar. In the same year she played the lead in Paalkhi. Tanna has also acted in several television advertisements, including Stayfree, Lifebuoy and Nirma. She was also a part of Rajshri Productions' Pyaar Ke Do Naam: Ek Raadha, Ek Shyaam. In September 2006, Tanna made her theater debut with the Hinglish romantic comedy Perfect Wedding, directed by Vandana Sajnani. The work was adapted from Robin Howdon's British play of the same name.

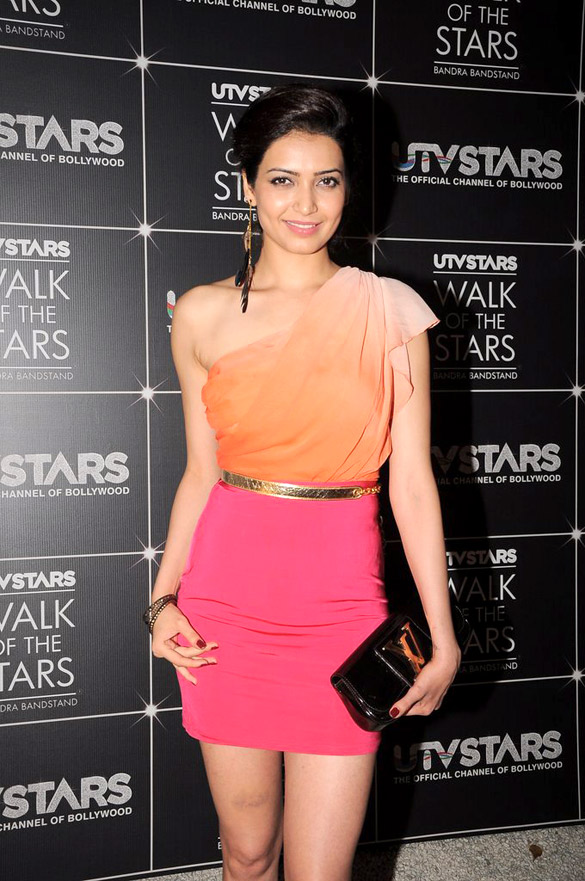
Tanna in 2012

Tanna participated in the stage-based comedy TV series Comedy Circus, that started in June 2007. She later came back in Comedy Circus Mahasangram in February 2010. In 2008, she participated in Zara Nachke Dikha and won the show along with her team. She later participated in Kaun Jeetega Bollywood Ka Ticket and Kaho Na Yaar Hai.

She presented reality shows like Kaante Ki Takkar and Comedy Champions. Tanna hosted a magic-based reality TV show, India's Magic Star in July 2010. In August 2010, she participated in Imagine TV's Meethi Choori No 1. She also played the role of Avni in Star One's Jaane Pehchaane Se... Ye Ajnabbi. In 2011, she participated in Zor Ka Jhatka: Total Wipeout. The same year, she played Ms Jaffery in Sony TV's Adaalat. In 2011, Tanna appeared in the music video "Khoya Khoya Chand- The Bartender Remix" from Mikey McCleary’s The Bartender. In 2012, she acted in the children's television program Baal Veer, playing the role of Rani Pari.

=== 2014–present: Naagin 3 and further work ===
Karishma Tanna was a contestant on the popular controversial reality show, Bigg Boss 8. She spent 4 months inside the house and became the winner 1st runner-up. In 2015, Tanna participated in the dance reality show Nach Baliye 7 along with Upen Patel and emerged as the 2nd runner-up.

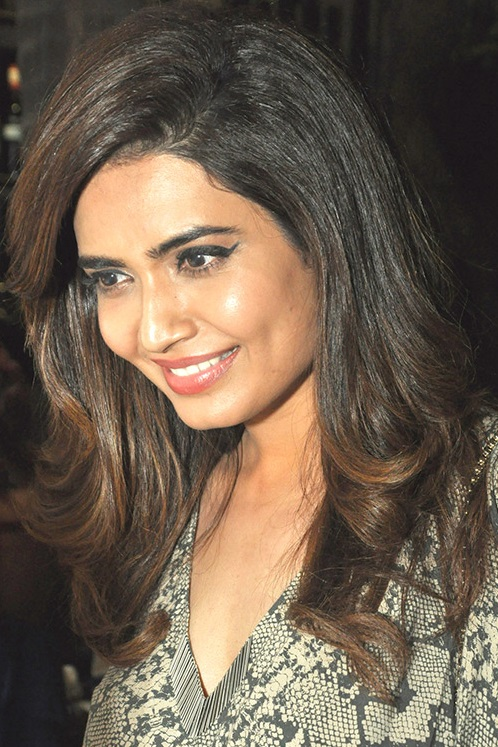
Tanna in 2017

In March 2016, Karishma made a guest appearance in the popular stunt reality show Fear Factor: Khatron Ke Khiladi 7. She also appeared as a guest in the popular comedy show Comedy Nights Bachao, which aired on Colors TV. Karishma participated in the popular dance reality show Jhalak Dikhhla Jaa 9 in 2016. Tanna also played the role of Maskeeni in Life OK's show Naagarjuna – Ek Yoddha. In January 2017, Tanna judged BIG Magic's reality show Big Memsaab along with Sambhavna Seth and Pritam Singh.

In April 2018, she appeared in ALT Balaji's Karrle Tu Bhi Mohabbat as Zoya Hussain. In May 2018, Tanna played the cameo role of Ruhi in Colors TV's popular supernatural series Naagin 3. In June 2018, Tanna acted in Rajkumar Hirani's film Sanju as a character named Pinky alongside Ranbir Kapoor and Vicky Kaushal. She also played the lead in Ekta Kapoor's Qayamat Ki Raat as Gauri. In February 2019, Tanna appeared on Kitchen Champion 5 along with Karan Tacker. Later in May 2019, she appeared on Khatra Khatra Khatra. In 2020, she participated in Fear Factor: Khatron Ke Khiladi 10 and emerged as the winner. In November 2020, she appeared in Suraj Pe Mangal Bhari in the song "Basanti". In 2021, Tanna appeared in the web series Bullets as Lolo. In 2023, she is seen in Hansal Mehta's web series 'Scoop' released on Netflix, where she plays an accused Gujarati crime reporter.

== Personal life ==
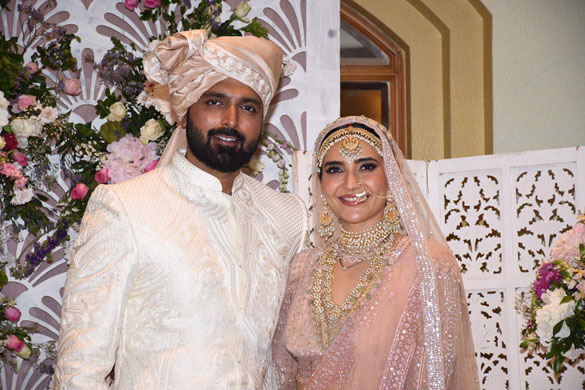
Karishma Tanna and Varun Bangera snapped post their wedding

Tanna started dating actor Upen Patel in 2014 when they met inside the Bigg Boss 8 house and later was engaged to him. In 2016, they ended their relationship.

Tanna started dating a Mumbai-based real estate businessman Varun Bangera in 2021. In the same year, they got engaged in an intimate ceremony. She married Varun Bangera on 5 February 2022.

She is a fitness and wellness enthusiast.

== Filmography ==
=== Films ===
Year	Title	Role	Language
2005	Dosti: Friends Forever	Nandini Thapar	Hindi
2011	I Am Sorry Mathe Banni Preethsona	Chetana	Kannada
2013	Grand Masti	Unatti	Hindi
2014	Gollu Aur Pappu	Shalini	Hindi
2018	Sanju	Pinky	Hindi
2020	Suraj Pe Mangal Bhari	Basanti	Hindi
2021	Lahore Confidential	Yukti	Hindi

=== Television ===
Year	Title	Role	Notes
2001–2005	Kyunki Saas Bhi Kabhi Bahu Thi	Indira Gandhi / Indira Virani	
2002–2003	Kahi To Milenge	Tanisha	
2003	Manshaa	Rhea	
2003–2004	Des Mein Niklla Hoga Chand	Tina	
2003–2004	Kkoi Dil Mein Hai	Krutika	
2004	Kkusum	Muskaan	
2004	Shararat	Natasha	Special appearance
2005	Raat Hone Ko Hai	Arti	
2005–2006	Paalkhi	Palak	
2005–2006	Ek Ladki Anjaani Si	Ayesha	
2006–2007	Viraasat	Natasha	
2006	Pyaar Ke Do Naam: Ek Raadha, Ek Shyaam	Jitisha	
2006	Fear Factor India	Contestant	
2007–2008	Comedy Circus	Contestant/Host	
2007	Aahat	Laseeka	
2008	Kaun Jeetega Bollywood Ka Ticket	Contestant	
2009	Kaho Na Yaar Hai	Contestant	
2009	Zara Nachke Dikha	Contestant	
2009	Comedy Champions	Host	
2010	India's Magic Star	Host	
2010	Jaane Pehchaane Se... Ye Ajnabbi	Avni	
2010	Sajan Re Jhoot Mat Bolo	Kiran	
2010	Meethi Choori No 1	Contestant	
2011	Adaalat	Ms Jaffrey	
2012–2013	Baal Veer	Rani Pari	Lead role
2013	F.I.R	Various Characters	
2014	Jeanie Aur Juju	Soniya	
2014–2015	Bigg Boss 8	Contestant	1st runner-up
2015	Nach Baliye 7	Contestant	2nd runner-up
2015–2016	MTV Love School	Host	
2016	Jhalak Dikhhla Jaa	Contestant	7th place
2016	Box Cricket League	Contestant	
2016–2017	Naagarjuna – Ek Yoddha	Maskeeni	
2017	Rasoi Ki Jung Mummyon Ke Sung	Contestant	
2017	BIG Memsaab	Judge	
2018; 2019	Naagin 3	Ruhi/Huzoor	
2018–2019	Qayamat Ki Raat	Gauri/ Raajlakshmi/ Vaidehi	
2018–2019	Karrle Tu Bhi Mohabbat	Zoya Hussain	
2019	Kitchen Champion 5	Contestant	
2020	Fear Factor: Khatron Ke Khiladi 10	Contestant	Winner
2021	Bullets	Lolo	
2022	Guilty Minds	Mala Kumari	
2022	Hush Hush	Geeta Tehlan	
2023	Scoop	Jagruti Pathak	
2024	Call Me Bae	Naina Khanna	Special appearance

=== Music videos ===
Year	Title	Singer	Ref.
2002	Paisa	Agosh	
2011	The Bartender Remix	Suman Shridhar	
2021	Qatra	Stebin Ben	

== Awards and nominations ==
Year	Award	Category	Show	Results	Ref.
2003	Indian Telly Awards	Best Actress in a Comic Role	Kyunki Saas Bhi Kabhi Bahu Thi	Nominated	
2008	Star Guild Awards	Best Actress in a Negative Role	Ek Ladki Anjaani Si	Nominated	
2016	Zee Gold Awards	Best Anchor	MTV Love School	Nominated	
2016	Zee Gold Awards	Most Fit Actor (Female)	N/A	Won	
2018	Zee Gold Awards	Most Fit Actor (Female)	N/A	Won	
2023	Asia Contents Awards & Global OTT Awards	Best Lead Actress	Scoop	Won	
2023	2023 Filmfare OTT Awards	Best Actor, Series (Female), Critics: Drama	Scoop	Won	
2023	2023 Filmfare OTT Awards	Best Actress in A Drama series	Scoop	Nominated	

== See also ==
- List of Indian television actresses
