= Sana Khan =

Indian businesswoman and former actress (born 1987/1988)

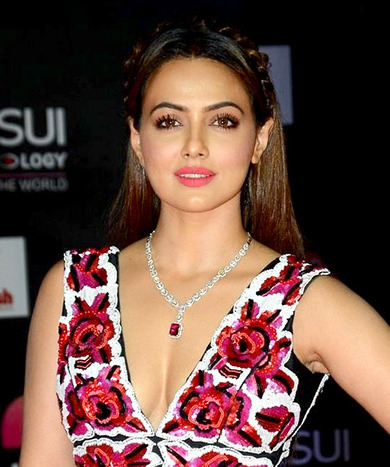
- Khan in 2016
- Born: August 21, 1987 (age 39) or August 21, 1988 (age 38); Dharavi, Bombay, (now Mumbai), Maharashtra, India
- Other name: Saiyad Sana Khan
- Occupations: Businesswoman; former actress
- Years active: 2005–2020
- Spouse: Anas Sayed (m. 2020)
- Children: 2
- Website: facespabysanakhan.com

Saiyad Sana Khan (born on 21 August in 1987/1988) is an Indian businesswoman and former actress. She primarily worked in Hindi, Tamil, and Telugu language films before retiring from the industry in 2020.

== Early and personal life ==
Sana Khan, born on 21 August in 1987/1988, hails from Bombay, (Dharavi). Her father is a Muslim originally from Kannur, Kerala, while her mother, Saeeda, is from Mumbai.

On 13 March 2009, Khan's mother suffered a hemorrhage.

In February 2019, Khan publicly acknowledged her relationship with choreographer Melvin Louis. However, the relationship ended in February 2020, with Sana saying, “I broke up with Melvin because he was cheating on me."

On 8 October 2020, Khan took to Instagram to announce her decision to quit the entertainment industry saying that she would "serve humanity and follow the order of her Creator."

On 21 November 2020, Khan married a Muslim cleric, Mufti Anas Sayed, in Surat. She officially expanded her name to Saiyad Sana Khan after marriage. The couple have two children.

== Career ==
=== Early work and acting debut (2005–2009) ===
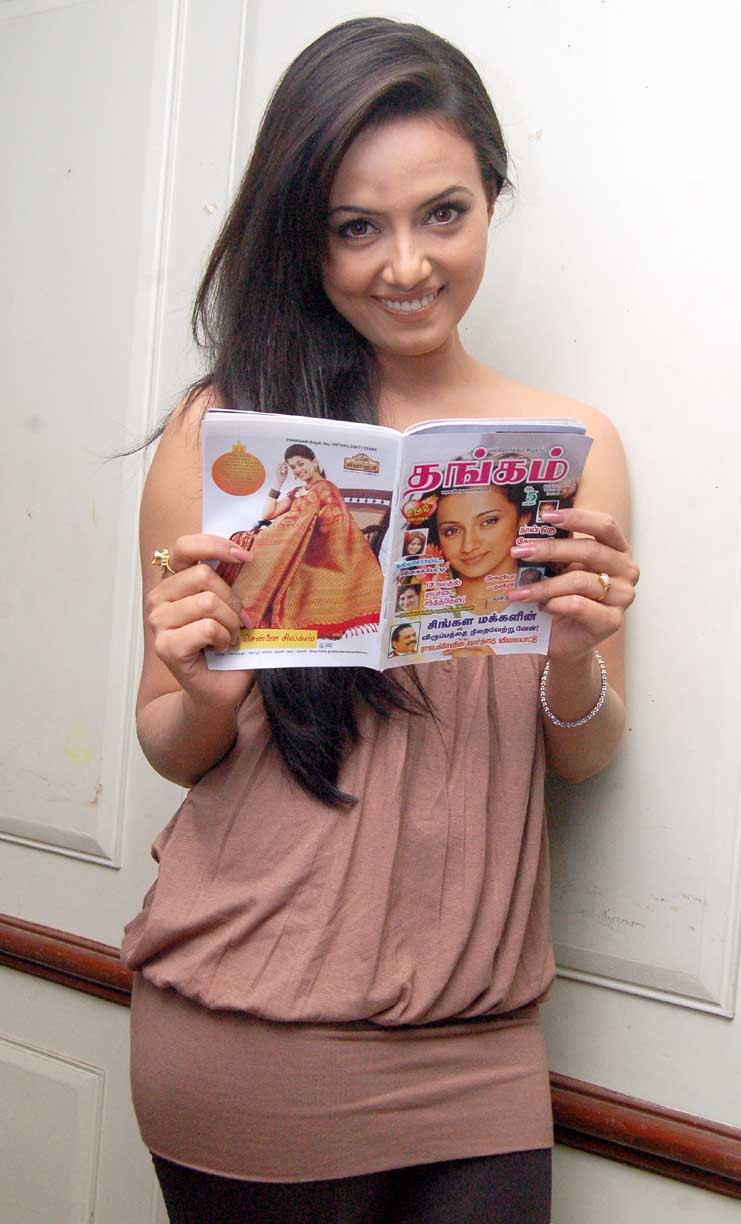
Khan with a copy of Thangam magazine in 2009

Khan made her acting debut in the 2005 low-budget Hindi film Yehi Hai High Society. In 2006, Khan made her Tamil film debut with E in an item number.

Khan has acted in over 50 ad films, including a cosmetic commercial directed by Shirish Kunder in July 2007. She has also done ads for the deodorant brand Secret Temptation, Yatra.com, and the Xbox 360 video game console.

In March 2007, Khan's TV commercial for the men's underwear brand Amul Macho showed her provocatively scrubbing and washing some underwear, simulating an orgasm. It created great controversy and was banned by the Indian government on the grounds of sexual profanity. The company rehired Khan, shot a sequel to the commercial with a different theme, and released it in February 2008.

In July 2007, Khan appeared in the film, Journey Bombay to Goa directed by Raj Pendurkar in an item number, "Lawani" sung by Sonu Kakkar. In November 2007, Khan appeared in the film Goal in the item number "Billo Rani" choreographed by Saroj Khan.

In January 2008, Khan appeared in the film Halla Bol. Khan's debut Tamil film Silambattam, produced by Lakshmi Movie Makers, was released in December 2008. Silambarasan, the film's lead actor, who had previously signed and then dropped her for a role in his film Kettavan, called her again for the female lead role in Silambattam after seeing her ad with Shah Rukh Khan. She played Janu, a talkative, tomboyish brahmin village girl, and won the 2009 ITFA Best New Actress Award in Singapore.

=== Further success and Bigg Boss (2010–2013) ===
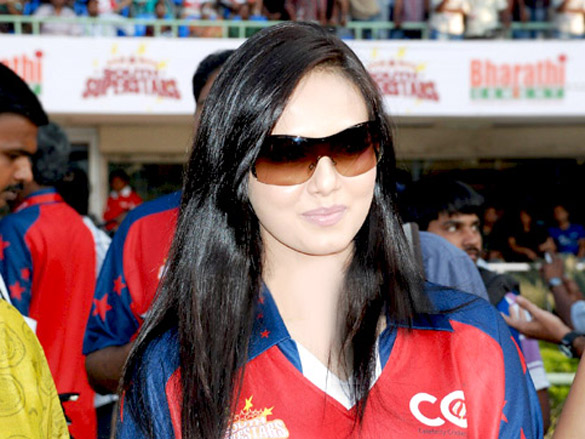
Khan in 2011

In March 2010, her next Tamil film, Thambikku Indha Ooru, was released. Later that year, Khan ventured into the Telugu film industry, appearing in Nandamuri Kalyan Ram's Kalyanram Kathi, released in November 2010. Khan's next release was the February 2011 bilingual thriller titled Gaganam and Payanam – shot in Telugu and Tamil, respectively – which was based on an aircraft hijack theme.

In May 2011, Khan stepped into Kannada films with Golden Movies' Kool...Sakkath Hot Maga. In September 2011, her next Tamil film, Aayiram Vilakku, was released. In the March 2012 Telugu film Mr. Nookayya, Khan played a waitress in a pub, adding glamour to the film. Khan made her Malayalam film debut with Climax, loosely based on the Hindi film The Dirty Picture, playing the South Indian actress Silk Smitha.

In October 2012, Khan was a celebrity contestant in the sixth season of the Indian version of the reality TV show Big Brother, Bigg Boss. She gained a lot of popularity from the show and managed to stay in the show till the end, though she finished in third place.

=== Established actress and further success (2014–2019) ===
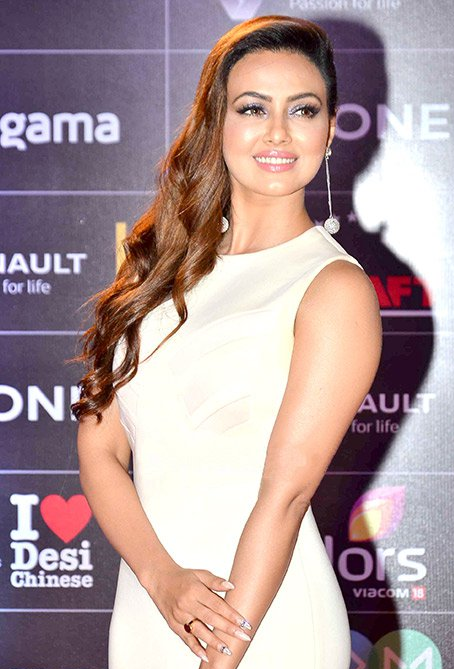
Khan in 2016

Khan played the daughter of Danny Denzongpa in the Bollywood film Jai Ho, released on 24 January 2014. In July 2014, Khan participated in the celebrity dance reality series, Jhalak Dikhhla Jaa 7 as a contestant. She entered as a wild card entrant and got eliminated later.

In January 2015, Khan participated in Bigg Boss Halla Bol, spin off of Bigg Boss 8 as one of the challengers. The spin-off series officially launched on 4 January, She got evicted in the second week. In February 2015, she participated in the celebrity stunt reality show, Fear Factor: Khatron Ke Khiladi 6 as a contestant. The shoot of the series started in November 2014 and wrapped up a month later. Khan got eliminated in March 2015. In May 2015, Khan starred in a Punjabi music video song "Black Till" sung by Girik Aman and produced by Dr Zeus.

In 2016, she acted in the film Wajah Tum Ho opposite Sharman Joshi and Gurmeet Choudhary. The film was a flop at Box Office India. Her bold scenes with Gurmeet and Rajneesh Duggal in the film were much discussed after the trailer was released on YouTube. Khan did a special appearance in Toilet: Ek Prem Katha in which she was seen portraying Akshay Kumar's girlfriend.

=== Business ventures ===
Khan is the founder of two business ventures, "Face Spa by Sana Khan" and "Haya By Sana Khan". She also owns the "Hayat Welfare Foundation" with her husband, Anas Sayed.

== Filmography ==
=== Films ===
Year	Film	Role	Language	Notes
2005	Yehi Hai High Society	Sonia	Hindi	
2006	E	Herself	Tamil	Special appearance in "Theepori Parakkum" song
2007	Bombay to Goa	Herself	Hindi	Special appearance in "Lawani" song
2007	Dhan Dhana Dhan Goal	Herself	Hindi	Special appearance in "Billo Rani" Song
2008	Silambattam	Jaanu	Tamil	
2008	Halla Bol	Sania	Hindi	
2010	Thambikku Indha Ooru	Divya	Tamil	
2010	Kalyanram Kathi	Anjali	Telugu	
2011	Gaganam	Sandhya	Telugu	Bilingual film
2011	Payanam	Sandhya	Tamil	Bilingual film
2011	Kool...Sakkath Hot Maga	Kajol	Kannada	
2011	Aayiram Vilakku	Megha	Tamil	
2012	Mr. Nookayya	Shilpa	Telugu	
2013	Climax	Poongkodi / Supriya	Malayalam	
2014	Jai Ho	Kavita Singh Patil	Hindi	
2016	Wajah Tum Ho	Siya	Hindi	
2017	Toilet: Ek Prem Katha	Keshav's lover	Hindi	Cameo appearance
2019	Ayogya	Herself	Tamil	Special appearance in "Vera Level U" song

=== Television ===
Year	Shows	Role	Notes	Ref(s)
2012–2013	Bigg Boss 6	Contestant	2nd Runner-up	
2013	Bigg Boss 7	Guest	Dance Performance in Grand Premiere	
2014	Jhalak Dikhhla Jaa 7	Contestant	Wild card; not selected	
2015	Bigg Boss Halla Bol!	Contestant	Challenger, Evicted Day 14	
2015	Fear Factor: Khatron Ke Khiladi 6	Contestant	Eliminated (10th place)	
2015	Killerr Karaoke Atka Toh Latkah	Contestant	Episode 12	
2015	Bigg Boss 9	Guest	To give task to contestants	
2016	Comedy Nights Bachao	Guest	Bigg Boss special	
2016	Box Cricket League 2	Contestant	Player in Rowdy Bangalore	
2016	Comedy Nights Live	Guest	Dance Performance	
2016	Bigg Boss 10	Guest	To promote her movie Wajah Tum Ho	
2017	Yeh Rishta Kya Kehlata Hai	Guest	To promote Toilet: Ek Prem Katha	
2017	Entertainment Ki Raat	Guest	Along with Tanishaa Mukerji	
2018	Bigg Boss 12	Guest	For Diwali Task	
2019	Kitchen Champion 5	Contestant	Along with Parth Samthaan	
2019	Bigg Boss 13	Guest	For Diwali Task	

=== Web series ===
Year	Name	Role	Platform	Ref(s)
2018	Zindabaad	Benazir Khan	JioCinema; VB on The Web	
2020	Special OPS	Sonya	Hotstar	

=== Music videos ===
List of music video credits
Year	Title	Singer(s)	Notes	Ref.
2015	"Black Till"	Girik Aman		
