= Rahul Mahajan =

Indian entertainer (born 1975)

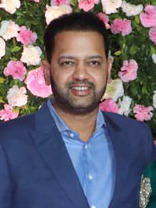
- Mahajan in 2018
- Born: 25 July 1975 (age 51); Maharashtra, India
- Occupation: Entertainer
- Years active: 2008–present
- Spouses: Shweta Singh (m. 2006; div. 2008) Dimpy Ganguly (m. 2010; div. 2015) Natalya Ilina (m. 2018; div. 2023)
- Parent: Pramod Mahajan (father) Rekha Mahajan (mother)
- Relatives: Poonam Mahajan (sister)

Rahul Mahajan (born 25 July 1975) is an Indian reality show entertainer and former pilot. He is the son of former union cabinet minister Pramod Mahajan. He appeared as a contestant on reality shows like Bigg Boss 2, Bigg Boss Halla Bol and Bigg Boss 14.

== Career ==
Rahul participated in Bigg Boss 2 in 2008. He was the finalist of the season. But a couple of days before the Grand Finale, Rahul Mahajan, Raja Chaudhary, Ashutosh Kaushik and Zulfi Syed climbed the wall to get out of the house. Mahajan has participated in Rahul Dulhaniya Le Jayega, the reality show sequel of Rakhi Ka Swayamwar. This show was a swayamvar for Rahul Mahajan, where 17 girls were participating including his would-be bride. Rahul Mahajan married Dimpy Mahajan (née Ganguly), a 25-year-old Bengali model and actress on 6 March 2010. As the previous version of the show (Rakhi Ka Swayamwar) did not culminate in a marriage, the marriage of Dimpy with Rahul was the first one of its kind to be telecast on Indian television with a national audience. Rahul and his wife Dimpy Mahajan had participated in Nach Baliye season 5. He also participated in Bigg Boss alongside her, but both were ultimately eliminated.

In February 2022, he participated in StarPlus's Smart Jodi as Contestant with Natalya.

== Personal life ==
Rahul Mahajan is the elder child of former BJP leader Pramod Mahajan and Rekha Mahajan. His sister Poonam Mahajan is a member of parliament from Mumbai North Central and a politician of the BJP.

In July 2006, he became engaged to Shweta Singh whom he knew for 13 years and was with in flying school in US together and also flew for Jet Airways. In December 2007, both filed for a divorce with mutual consent; Shweta filed for divorce after accusing him of domestic violence on 13 December 2007 on grounds of incompatibility and mutual consent of both parties. On 1 August 2008, Rahul Mahajan and his wife were granted a divorce by a Gurgaon court. District Judge Ramendra Jain granted their divorce after both parties mutually agreed on the move.

In 2010, Mahajan married Dimpy Ganguly at the end of Rahul Ka Swayamwar, a TV reality show which staged a swayamvar for him. However, Dimpy left his Worli house after what she has described as violent abuse that involved "punching, kicking and dragging her by her hair". A source said the domestic abuse of Dimpy by Mahajan had started about a month after their national TV wedding.

Rahul Mahajan was married for the third time to Natalya Ilina, an ethnic Russian Kazakh model, on 20 November 2018.

== Television ==
- Bigg Boss 2 (2008) (Ejected on Day 93)
- Chhote Miyan - Jung Nanhe Hasgullon Ki (2008)
- Chhote Miyan - Chapter 2 (2009)
- Chhote Miyan Bade Miyan (2009)
- Rahul Dulhaniya Le Jayega (2010)
- Emotional Atyachar (Season 1) (2010)
- Job Time TV (2010)
- Jubilee Comedy Circus (2011)
- Perfect Bachelor (2011)
- Welcome - Baazi Mehmaan Nawazi Ki (2013)
- Nach Baliye 5 (2013)
- Nach Baliye: Shriman V/s Shrimati (2013)
- Meri Maa... (Mother's Day Special) (2013)
- India's Dancing Superstar (2013)
- Nach Baliye 6 (2013)
- Comedy Nights with Kapil (2014)
- Bigg Boss Halla Bol (2015) (Entered on Day 105 & Evicted on Day 126)
- Comedy Classes (2015)
- Comedy Nights Bachao (S1; E22) (2016)
- Cricket, Camera, Action! (2016–17)
- Nach Baliye 9 (2019)
- Bigg Boss 14 (2020–21) (Entered on Day 65 & Evicted on Day 93)
- Smart Jodi (2022)
