= Nigaar Khan =

Indian actress (b. 1979)

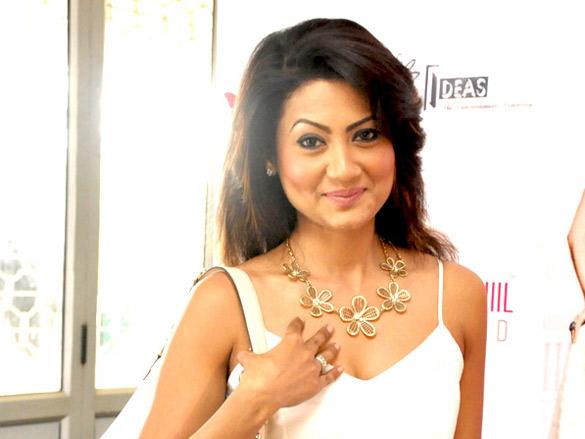
- Born: Nigaar Zafar Khan; 2 May 1979 (age 47); Pune, Maharashtra, India
- Occupation: Actress
- Years active: 2002–2017
- Spouse: Khayaam Sheikh (m. 2015)
- Relatives: Gauahar Khan (sister)

Nigaar Khan (born 2 May 1979) is an Indian television actress mainly known for her portrayal of negative characters.

== Early life ==
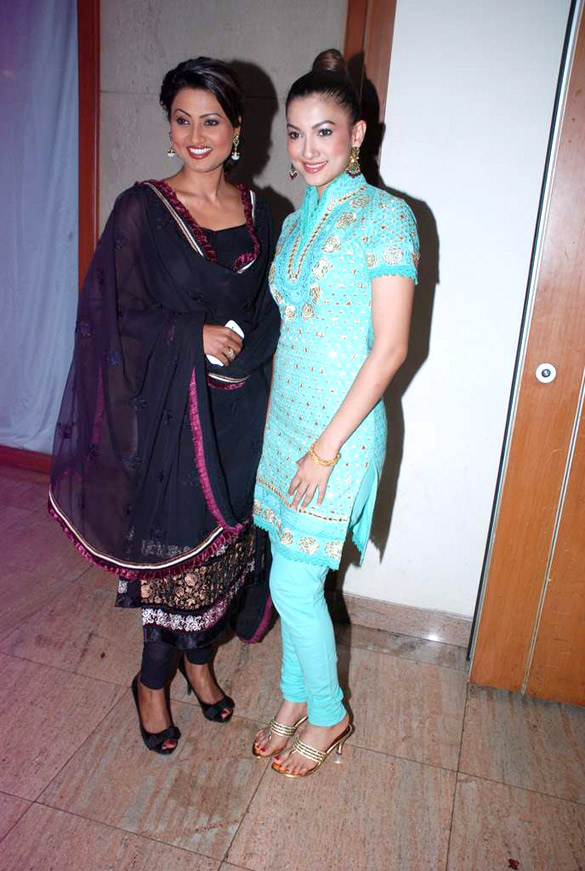
Khan with sister Gauahar Khan in 2011

Khan was born and brought up in Pune, Maharashtra. She is the elder sister of model-actress Gauahar Khan.

== Career ==
In 2008, Khan participated in the dancing competition show Ek Khiladi Ek Haseena along with Indian cricketer Dinesh Karthik. Their dance in one of the episodes on the song "Woh Ladki Hai Kaha" (Dil Chahta Hai) was well appreciated by the judges, Sushmita Sen and Wasim Akram, and the audience.

In 2011, the reality TV show The Khan Sisters focused on the lives of Khan and her sister Gauahar. The following year Khan appeared in the show Sacch Ka Saamna. She also hosted the show Love Story, showcased some love stories of Bollywood. Khan presented the stories and interviewed various celebrities.

In 2013, Khan appeared on the reality show Welcome – Baazi Mehmaan-Nawaazi Ki along with VJ Andy, Ragini Khanna and Sanaya Irani. Since September 2013, Khan has appeared in the mythological show Buddha based on life of Gautama Buddha. She plays the role of Buddha's aunt and Devadatta's mother.

In November 2014, Khan participated in Bigg Boss 8 as wild card entrant. She survived for two weeks.

In June 2016, she made a comeback on television in the children's show Baal Veer on SAB TV as an evil fairy called Prachandika to create hurdles in the life of Baal Veer.

== Personal life ==
Khan married her long-time boyfriend and Pakistani business man Khayyam Sheikh in Dubai on 23 July 2015. Khan moved to Dubai after her marriage.

== Television ==
Year	Serial	Role	Notes	Ref
2002–2004	Lipstick	Sheetal Singhania	Negative role	
2004–2005	Prratima	Anjali Thakur / Anjali Atul Roy	Negative role	
2006	Stree Teri Kahani			
2004–2005	Hum 2 Hain Na	Shyla Dhanrajgir	Negative role	
2005–2006	India Calling	Kamini Khanna	Negative role	
2006	Kasamh Se	Pranali	Negative role	
2007	Kyunki Saas Bhi Kabhi Bahu Thi	Neha		
2007	Ek Ladki Anjaani si		Negative role	
2008	Ek Khiladi Ek Haseena	Contestant		
2008	Har Ghar Kuch Kehta Hai		Negative role	
2009	Yes Boss	Angelina		
2009–2010	Mitwa Phool Kamel Ke	Rajbala	Negative role	
2010	Sajan Ghar Jaana Hai	Mohini		
2010	Comedy Circus	Contestant		
2011	The Khan Sisters	Herself		
2012	Sacch Ka Saamna	Herself		
2012	Sapno Ke Bhawar Mein	Rangoli	Negative role	
2012	Love Story	Host		
2013	Welcome – Baazi Mehmaan-Nawaazi Ki	Contestant		
2013	Jane Bhi Do	Host		
2013	Hongey Judaa Na Hum	Simran Rajpal		
2013	Savitri - Ek Prem Kahani	Yakshini	Negative role	
2013	Buddha	Mangala	Negative role	
2013	Comedy Nights with Kapil	Various Characters		
2014	Main Naa Bhoolungi	Madhurima Jagganath	Negative role	
2014	Bigg Boss 8	Contestant		
2014	Taarak Mehta Ka Ooltah Chashmah	Sophia		
2016	Baal Veer	Prachandika	Negative role	
2017	Khwaabon Ke Darmiyaan			
