= Armanon Ka Balidaan-Aarakshan =

Indian political thriller television series

- Genre: Political thriller
- Written by: Kamal Pandey
- Directed by: Ravindra Gautam
- Starring: See below
- Country of origin: India
- Original language: Hindi
- No. of episodes: 91

Production
- Producers: Ravindra Gautam, RG Media
- Cinematography: Santosh Suryanshi
- Running time: 24 minutes

Original release
- Network: Imagine TV
- Release: 29 November 2010 – 1 April 2011

Armanon Ka Balidaan-Aarakshan (transl. Sacrifice of wishes-Conservation) is a 2010-2011 Indian political thriller television series aired on Imagine TV. The show was set during the period of the Mandal Commission protests of 1990. The show garnered controversy for airing promos containing political violence. The series was directed by Ravindra Gautam.

== Premise ==
"Sumedha, a girl who lost her brother to protests held against the reservation system - but falls in love with Aakash, a boy who instead benefited from it. The series depicts a myriad of family strife, love, and inequality - making it an interesting watch." summed up The Economic Times.

== Cast ==
- Pariva Pranati as Sumedha
- Arya Kumar as Aakash
- Muni Jha as Kamlapati Mishra
- Dolly Bindra
