= Dimpy Ganguli =

Indian model and television personality (born 1985)

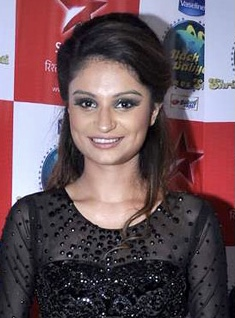
- Ganguli in 2013
- Born: 25 July 1988 (age 37); Kolkata, West Bengal, India
- Years active: 2010-present
- Spouses: Rahul Mahajan (m. 2010; div. 2015) Rohit Roy (m. 2015)
- Children: 3

Dimpy Ganguli (born Soumoshree Ganguli; 25 July 1988) is an Indian model and television personality, known for appearing in Nach Baliye 5 and Bigg Boss 8.

== Early life ==
Her real name is Soumoshree Ganguli, Dimpy was her nickname. She belongs to Bengali family and her father's name is Saibal Ganguly and her mother's name is Sushmita Ganguli. Dimpy graduated with an honors degree in English literature from the renowned Scottish Church College in 2009.

== Personal life ==
In 2010, Ganguli married Rahul Mahajan, son of BJP leader Pramod Mahajan, on Imagine TV's swayamvar reality show, Rahul Dulhaniya Le Jayenge. Ganguli filed for divorce on the grounds of domestic violence and physical abuse. The couple finally divorced in February 2015.

In November 2015, Ganguli married Dubai-based businessman, Rohit Roy. Their daughter Reanna was born on 20 June 2016. In 2020, Ganguly gave birth to a son Aryaan. Ganguly gave birth to second son Rishaan on 27 July 2022.

== Career ==
She was one of the contestants of Gladrags Mega Model Manhunt 2009, a beauty contest from India. She was also the second runners up in Sananda Tilottama in 2007.

In 2014, she participated in the television reality shows Bigg Boss 8 and its spin-off Bigg Boss Halla Bol. She was evicted from the show on 31 January 2015.

== Television ==
Year	Name	Role	Notes	Ref
2010	Tujh Sang Preet Lagai Sajna	Dipika	Cameo	
2010	Yeh Rishta Kya Kehlata Hai	Anjana	Hina Khan's friend	
2010	Rahul Dulhaniya Le Jayega	Contestant	Winner	
2011	Zor Ka Jhatka: Total Wipeout	Contestant	Eliminated	
2011	Kahani Chandrakanta Ki	Naagin	Negative Role	
2012	Bade Achhe Lagte Hain	Preetika	Cameo	
2012	Sasural Genda Phool	Dimpy	Suhana friend	
2012–13	Nach Baliye 5	Contestant	Along with Rahul Mahajan	
2013	Nach Baliye Shriman v/s Shrimati	Contestant	Along with	
2013	Ek Hazaaron Mein Meri Behna Hai	Guest	Cameo	
2013	Welcome – Baazi Mehmaan Nawazi Ki	Contestant	Along with Amar Upadhyay, Gizele Thakral, Karanvir Bohra & Debina Bonnerjee	
2014–15	Bigg Boss 8	Contestant	Wild Card, Champion	
2015	Bigg Boss Halla Bol	Contestant	Finalist	
2015	Killerr Karaoke Atka Toh Latkah	Contestant	Along with Debina & Sreejita De	
2015	Comedy Classes	Guest	Along with Rakhi Sawant & Bharti Singh	
2016	Box Cricket League 2	Contestant		
