= Ratan Raajputh =

Indian television actress

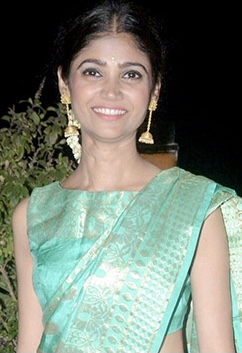
- Born: Patna, Bihar, India
- Occupations: Actress; blogger
- Years active: 2006–2020
- Known for: Amba in Mahabharat; Santoshi in Santoshi Maa
- Website: https://www.youtube.com/c/RatanRaajputh/videos

Ratan Raajputh, is an Indian television actress and blogger known for her portrayal of Laali in Agle Janam Mohe Bitiya Hi Kijo on Zee TV. Later, she went on to play Amba in Mahabharat & Santoshi in Santoshi Maa.

== Early life ==
Ratan was born and brought up in Bihar and did her schooling from there.

== Career ==
Ratan made her television debut with Raavan in 2006. Raajputh rose to prominence with her portrayal of Laali in television series Agle Janam Mohe Bitiya Hi Kijo and earned numerous accoloads. In 2013, Ratan participated in a reality show Bigg Boss 7 and got evicted on day 28.

Ratan lost her father and was suffering from depression when she began traveling to cope with it. Following the lockdown in 2020, Ratan started her YouTube channel where she shares her traveling story. Ratan lockdown videos made waves on internet and was covered by major news portal.

== Television ==
| Year | Show | Role | Notes |
|---|---|---|---|
| 2006–2007 | Raavan | Chandernakha | |
| 2008-2009 | Radhaa Ki Betiyaan Kuch Kar Dikhayengi | Ruchi Sharma | |
| 2009–2011 | Agle Janam Mohe Bitiya Hi Kijo | Laali | |
| 2010 | Ratan Ka Rishta | Herself | The Bachelorette India |
| 2010 | Dil Se Diya Vachan | Singer and Dancer in Prem and Nandini's Wedding | Cameo Appearance (Episode 25) |
| 2013 | Bigg Boss 7 | Contestant | Evicted Day 28 |
| 2013 | Fear Files | Nalini | |
| 2013-2014 | Mahabharat | Amba | |
| 2014 | MTV Fanaah | Iravati L | |
| 2014–2015 | Box Cricket League 1 | Contestant | Player in 'Rowdy Bangalore' |
| 2015-2017 | Santoshi Maa | Santoshi Dhairya Mishra | |
| 2020 | Santoshi Maa - Sunayein Vrat Kathayein | Devi Ushma | |

== Awards ==
2009 Zee Rishtey Awards

- Favourite Saas-Bahu – Agle Janam Mohe Bitiya Hi Kijo
- Popular Female Face of the Year – Agle Janam Mohe Bitiya Hi Kijo

2009 Indian Telly Awards

- Best Actress in a Lead Role – Agle Janam Mohe Bitiya Hi Kijo

2009 Indian Television Academy Awards

- Best Actress Drama – Agle Janam Mohe Bitiya Hi Kijo

2010 Gold Awards

- Best Actress in a Lead Role – Agle Janam Mohe Bitiya Hi Kijo
