= Radhaa Ki Betiyaan Kuch Kar Dikhayengi =

- Directed by: Pawan Kumar Marut
- Creative director: Rashmi Sharma
- Country of origin: India
- Original language: Hindi
- No. of seasons: 1
- No. of episodes: 101

Production
- Producers: Tony Singh; Deeya Singh
- Camera setup: multi-camera
- Running time: approx. 25 minutes
- Production company: DJ's a Creative Unit

Original release
- Network: NDTV Imagine
- Release: 21 January 2008 – 12 February 2009

Radhaa Ki Betiyaan Kuch Kar Dikhayengi (Hindi: राधा की बेटियां कुछ कर दिखाएंगी) is an Indian soap opera which aired on NDTV Imagine in February 2008. The series was produced by DJ's a Creative Unit.

== Plot ==
The show narrates the story of a widow Radha, and her three capable daughters - righteous and sensible Rohini (Meethi), bold and energetic Ragini (Ginni), and shy Ruchi (Chhutki) - who migrate to Mumbai from Meerut. The sisters are unlike each other and aspire for different careers but support each other through life.

Rohini wants to be a fashion designer, Ragini wants to pursue modelling, and Ruchi wants to be an astronaut. They struggle to find their place in the big city of Mumbai.

Rohini finds herself constantly put down by her competitive colleague, even though her choices and ideas are better. Ragini lies about her financial status in her college to fit in, and is busted. Ruchi fails to get into college because of her quiet nature, but is helped by her friend Adi.

When their mother sells her jewelry to get a nice gift for a relative's wedding, the sisters enroll themselves in a dance competition, win it, and repurchase the jewelry. They also save the Roshan Villa, where they live, from auctioning away. As their previous acquaintances return, the sisters find it difficult to deal with their problems but manage to win through in the end.

== Cast ==
- Supriya Pilgaonkar as Radhaa Sharma
- Anita Kanwal as Roshan Ammu; landlady, grandmother
- Mona Vasu as Rohini Sharma; Meethi (eldest daughter)
- Ragini Khanna as Ragini Sharma; Gini (middle daughter)
- Ratan Rajput as Ruchi Sharma; Chutki (youngest daughter)
- Apurva Agnihotri as Dr. Shekhar Kapoor, Ammu's doctor, Varun's childhood friend, Rohini's husband
- Nikhil Roy as Nikhil, Ragini's close friend and love interest
- Sanaya Irani as Sanaya, Ragini friend
- Abhimaan Balhara as Aditya, Ruchi's love interest
- Meghna Malik as Revati, Rohini's boss, owner of Gulmohar Fashion House, Nikhil's mother
- Vinay Jain as Varun Shamsher Singh, Ammu's son
- Payal Nair as Shefali Varun Singh, Varun's wife, Radhaa's close friend
- Mona Singh as Raunaq Makhija, Rohini's supervising designer, Dr. Shekhar's first
- Vivek Madan as Aniruddh (Ani)
- Garima Kapoor as Fatima (Fatty)
- Manish Paul as Karan, the photographer
- Amit Sareen as Gaurav
- Ridhi Dogra as Rani
- Chitz as Karan, Aditya's friend
