= Valentine's Night =

- First Look Poster
- Directed by: Kumar Baadal, Kirshan Kumar
- Written by: Kumar Baadal
- Produced by: Kirshan Kumar; Sanjeev Malhotra
- Starring: Payal Rohatgi; Sangram Singh; Rahul Minz; Neha Thakur
- Cinematography: Premanand Bhagirath
- Edited by: Manoj Mishra
- Music by: Astitva-The Band Background Score: Aniruddha Kale
- Release date: 10 February 2012
- Country: India
- Language: Hindi

Valentine's Night is a 2012 Hindi-language romantic thriller film directed by Krishan Kumar and Baadal. It features Payal Rohatgi, Sangram Singh, Rahul Minz, Neha Thakur as the lead roles. The film's music was composed by Astitva-The Band. The film, produced by Kirshan Kumar and Sanjeev Malhotra, was released on 10 February 2012.

== Cast ==
- Sangram Singh
- Payal Rohatgi
- Rahul Minz
- Neha Thakur
- Shaurya Singh as Politician
- Rakhi Sawant as an item number "Gaye Re Gaye"

== Soundtrack ==
The music was composed by (Astitva) THE BAND and released by T-Series.

Valentine's Night

Soundtrack album by (Astitva) THE BAND
- Released: 2012
- Recorded: 2012
- Genre: Soundtrack
- Length: 17:36
- Label: T-Series
- Producer: (Astitva) THE BAND

Track list
No.	Title	Lyrics	Singer(s)	Length
1.	"Ooo... Ree... Bawara..."	Tehseen Munawer	Salman Khan, Ustad Shakeel Ahmed Khan	5:00
2.	"Gaye Re Gaye Saand Paani Mein"	Tehseen Munawer	Kirshan Kumar, Manta Sidhu, Zaman Khan	4:12
3.	"Valentine Song"	Tehseen Munawer	Salman Khan, Sheetal Gupta	4:02
4.	"Upload... Download... Jaari... Rahega..."	Tehseen Munawer	Revant Shergill, Zaman Khan	4:22
Total length:				17:36

== Critical reception ==
The film received negative reviews from critics. Avijit Ghosh from Times of India also gave it 3.5/10 stating that "Valentine's Night ends up like one of those car drivers in the movie who doesn't know where to go and keeps circling the streets of Delhi." Rohit Vats of News18 wrote, "Avoid 'Valentine's Night' otherwise or no, wait, take your partner to watch it and I guarantee your break up".
