= Chakrapani (politician) =

Indian Hindu nationalist politician

Swami Chakrapani
- Born: Ghazipur, Uttar Pradesh, India
- Occupations: Politician, Artist
- Political party: Akhil Bharatiya Hindu Mahasabha

Swami Chakrapani is an Indian political activist. He is the leader of a breakaway faction of the Hindu Mahasabha and incumbent President of Hindu Mahasabha, a long-standing Hindu nationalist organisation in India, but claims to be its overall president.

In March 2018, Chakrapani was designated as a fraudulent ascetic by Akhil Bharatiya Akhara Parishad, the apex organisation of Hindu sants (saints) and sadhus (ascetics) in India. In 2022, he joined as a contestant in the Indian reality show Lock Upp.

== Early life ==
He was born into the Chitraguptavanshi Kayastha community in Ghazipur.

== Activism ==
Chakrapani has claimed to be the president of the Akhil Bharatiya Hindu Mahasabha (ABHM), advocating for the listing of ABHM as a political entity. The Election Commission of India refused to recognise the organisation due to ongoing rivalries with another faction that wants to be designated as the actual office-bearers of ABHM.

On 9 December 2015, Chakrapani bought a car that have been used by fugitive mobster Dawood Ibrahim at an auction for ₹32,000. The car was in a poor state and on 24 December, Chakrapani burnt the car along with posters of Ibrahim as a symbolic protest. Chakrapani initially wished to turn the car into an ambulance but withdrew after receiving threats from D-Company; he spoke about using the wreckage in the construction of a toilet. Chakrapani was soon allotted Z category security by the Government of India, due to threats from D-company; four people were arrested for plotting to kill Chakrapani. Chakrapani has since bid for other properties belonging to Dawood, including an eatery and hotel, intending to convert them into public toilets.

Chakrapani was one of the litigants in the Ram Janmabhoomi case and has proposed building a gold Ram temple in Ayodhya, which will have priests from the scheduled castes and scheduled tribes.

During the 2018 Kerala floods, Chakrapani publicly opposed providing help to beef eaters and blamed the floods on the killing of cows. Following his statement, the official website of the Hindu Mahasabha was hacked and defaced with a recipe for spicy beef curry.

In March 2018, the Akhil Bharatiya Akhara Parishad declared Chakrapani to be a "fake baba" (transl. false saint), saying he does not belong to any tradition of sanyasa. In response, Chakrapani said the Parishad were false saints and "a bogus body".

He has also promoted gomutra (cow urine) as a cure for ailments including COVID-19. In 2022, he participated in the Indian reality show Lock Upp but was the first to be eliminated.

== Television ==
Year	Title	Role	Notes
2022	Lock Upp	Contestant	Locked Out-Day 7
