= Lock Upp (season 1) =

First season of Indian reality television series Lock Upp

Lock Upp: Badass Jail, Atyaachari Khel!
- Season 1
- Starring: Munawar Faruqui; Swami Chakrapani; Saisha Shinde; Poonam Pandey; Babita Phogat; Sara Khan; Shivam Sharma; Siddharth Sharma; Anjali Arora; Nisha Rawal; Tehseen Poonawalla; Payal Rohatgi; Karanvir Bohra; Ali Merchant; Chetan Hansraj; Mandana Karimi; Azma Fallah; Zeeshan Khan; Vinit Kakar; Prince Narula
- Hosted by: Kangana Ranaut
- No. of contestants: 20
- Winner: Munawar Faruqui
- Runner-up: Payal Rohatgi
- Production company: Balaji Telefilms
- No. of episodes: 71

Release
- Original network: ALTBalaji; MX Player
- Original release: 27 February – 7 May 2022

Season chronology
- ← Previous; Season 0 Next → Season 2

Lock Upp: Badass Jail, Atyaachari Khel! is the first season of the Indian reality series Lock Upp, created by Ekta Kapoor. Hosted by Kangana Ranaut, the season premiered on ALTBalaji and MX Player on 27 February 2022.

The grand finale was held on 7 May 2022, where Munawar Faruqui won the season and Payal Rohatgi finished as the first runner-up.

== Format ==
Contestants, referred to as inmates, are placed inside a jail-themed set where they compete to earn basic necessities, perform tasks, reveal personal truths, and win the heart of the host and audience by showcasing their personalities. In the end, the contestant with the highest votes walks away with freedom and the trophy of Lock Upp.

== Inmates ==
Participants in order of appearance and entry into the jail.

=== Original entrants ===
- Munawar Faruqui – Stand-up comedian.
- Chakrapani – Self-proclaimed spiritual leader.
- Saisha Shinde – Fashion designer.
- Poonam Pandey – Actress and model.
- Babita Phogat – Wrestler and politician.
- Sara Khan – Actress.
- Shivam Sharma – Actor and reality television personality.
- Siddharth Sharma – Actor.
- Anjali Arora – Social media influencer.
- Nisha Rawal – Actress.
- Tehseen Poonawalla – Lawyer and political analyst.
- Payal Rohatgi – Actress and model.
- Karanvir Bohra – Actor.

=== Wildcard entrants ===
- Ali Merchant – Actor, anchor, DJ and music producer.
- Chetan Hansraj – Actor.
- Mandana Karimi – Actress and model.
- Azma Fallah – Social media personality.
- Zeeshan Khan – Actor and model.
- Vinit Kakar – Actor and entrepreneur.
- Prince Narula – Actor, model and reality television personality.

== Inmates status ==
Sr.	Inmate	Day entered	Day exited	Status
1	Munawar	Day 1	Day 70	Winner
2	Payal	Day 1	Day 70	1st Runner-up
3	Anjali	Day 1	Day 70	2nd Runner-up
4	Shivam	Day 1	Day 70	3rd Runner-up
5	Azma	Day 23	Day 70	4th Runner-up
6	Prince	Day 49	Day 70	Troublemaker
7	Saisha	Day 1	Day 28	Ejected
7	Saisha	Day 35	Day 68	Locked Out
8	Poonam	Day 1	Day 67	Locked Out
9	Ali	Day 15	Day 58	Locked Out
10	Karanvir	Day 1	Day 29	Locked Out by Vinit and Zeeshan
10	Karanvir	Day 35	Day 53	Locked Out
11	Zeeshan	Day 28	Day 53	Ejected
12	Mandana	Day 23	Day 49	Locked Out
13	Vinit	Day 29	Day 42	Locked Out
14	Nisha	Day 1	Day 35	Locked Out
15	Sara	Day 1	Day 28	Locked Out
16	Chetan	Day 20	Day 27	Ejected
17	Babita	Day 1	Day 21	Locked Out
18	Siddharth	Day 1	Day 20	Locked Out by Karanvir
19	Tehseen	Day 1	Day 14	Locked Out
20	Swami	Day 1	Day 7	Locked Out

Male
Female

== Guests ==
Week(s)	Day(s)	Guest(s)	Notes
Week 1	Premiere Night	Raveena Tandon	Celebrity guest jailor
Week 1	Premiere Night	Sunil Pal	To interact with Munawar Faruqui
Week 2	Day 11	Five inspirational women	To celebrate International Women's Day
Week 5	Day 35	Ankita Lokhande	To promote the second season of Pavitra Rishta
Week 7	Day 49	Ekta Kapoor	To celebrate the fifth anniversary of ALTBalaji
Week 7	Day 49	Tusshar Kapoor, Rohan Mehra, Krishna Kaul, Krystle D'Souza, Divya Agarwal and Nikhil Bhambri	To celebrate the fifth anniversary of ALTBalaji
Week 9	Day 60	Munawar's friend	For Munawar
Week 9	Day 60	Anjali's mother	For Anjali
Week 9	Day 60	Azma's mother	For Azma
Week 9	Day 60	Sangram Singh	For Payal
Week 9	Day 60	Poonam's mother	For Poonam
Week 9	Day 60	Prince's nephew	For Prince
Week 9	Day 60	Shivam's father	For Shivam
Week 9	Day 60	Saisha's friend	For Saisha
Week 9	Day 63	Umar Riaz and Zareen Khan	To promote the song "Eid Ho Jayegi"
Week 10	Day 66	Afsana Khan	To promote the song "Bechari"
Week 10	Day 67	Pratik Sehajpal	To promote the song "Subah Se Shaam"
Week 10	Day 69	Tejasswi Prakash	As warden
Week 10	Day 70	Divya Dutta and Razneesh Ghai	To promote Dhaakad

== Episodes ==
No.	Title	Original release date
1	"Badass Jailer Kangana Ke 13 Qaidi"	27 February 2022
Kangana Ranaut rakes the stage to talk about the show and the concept. She says that in her jail, it would not matter if the contestant is a star kid, influential politician or a famous business person – all that matters is the person needs to be controversial. Kangana also introduces the media people who will screen the Lock Upp contestants and put them up on a media trial. She then introduces the Lock Upp contestant.
2	"Aaj Kaun Hoga Nominate?"	28 February 2022
In the first nominations, The inmates nominate any two other inmates. Payal Rohatgi and Anjali Arora seem to be distraught by the lack of amenities given inside the house. They put forward their dissent and urge the jailer to give them at least the necessities. Payal puts forward the issue that the house has no access to sunlight or any form of the external environment. She explains, on camera, how she has been to a real Lock Upp and even there the environment is friendly with the view of trees and sunlight.
3	"Ab Qaidi Layenge Kranti"	1 March 2022
The contestants stage a protest and decide to go on a hunger strike if they are not provided with the basic amenities in the house. Babita requests the jailer to provide her with warm water as she has an issue with her legs and needs it for physio. Nisha Rawal, Sara Khan, Saisha, and others complain that they are not provided with their innerwear. Poonam Pandey complained of not having enough food supply as she needs her energy for her low BP. Even Anjali Arora complains of not having her makeup sent. To this, Munawar Farouqi comments that they are all locked up in jail and not a five-star hotel where all their whims and fancies will be catered to. Will the jailer take action against the contestants' mutiny?
4	"Jail Mein Jhagada"	2 March 2022
The day begins with the noisy alarm from the jailer which makes the inmates wake up in frustration. Later, in the day the contestants discuss the task that took place on the previous day. Poonam Pandey, Nisha Rawal, and Saisha also discuss their controversies which made them a part of the show. Poonam and Nisha talk about their abusive relationships and the consequences that they had to face for it while Saisha talks about the various unsolicited advice that was given to her before she undertook the gender reconstruction surgery. Later, the jailer announces that since the right block had won the task on the previous day they will be given all the things they had asked for. Everything rejoices to hear this and rushes to get their belongings. However, Payal had asked for sunlight which does not seem to be in sight yet.
5	"Kya Yeh Ek Tarfa Pyaar Hai?"	3 March 2022
Sara wakes up to find the heart that Shivam made for her in the night. She tells him that she had seen it in the night as well and compliments him. Shivam continues to flirt with Sara which makes her think that he is putting up an act and that he has been told to play a certain part. This upsets Shivam and he breaks down crying. Karan, Saisha, and others come to console him but he cries inconsolably. Sara also tries to calm him down and apologizes for assuming that he is putting up an act. Shivam tells her that he is like that and he wears his heart on his sleeve. Sara tells everyone that she finds it a little childish that Shivam says he has fallen in love with her in just 2 days. Where is this relationship headed? Will this remain a one-sided love or will Sara cave in and develop feelings for Shivam?
6	"Badass Jail Ka Badass Jailor"	4 March 2022
The jailer Karan Kundrra is in jail and he had a word with the contestants and try to explain to them that it's badass jail so they need to survive like this only. Where contestants discuss yesterday's task. Where jailer called Sara in a jhol ghar and he offered favorite food options to Sara where she got emotional but at last he made her week by showing her mother and she wanted to meet her. But for this repercussion will be faced by the other contestants. Munawar talks about his jail experience and what problems he faced.
7	"Queen Ne Li Sabki Class"	5 March 2022
Where queen Kangana Ranaut talks about the reality of the jail what they need to face and tries to show them the reality of Lock Upp. A group discussion has been held yesterday where contestants talk about their secrets and got emotional. While the queen has scolded everyone that it's a jail, not some luxurious resort. Where they need to stop complaining and live like that. A task has been given to nominated contestants. Who will be nominated this week?
8	"Who revealed Their secrets?"	6 March 2022
The queen grills the contestants and tries to show the reality of this badass jail. Where nominated contents Swami, Anjali, and Siddharth are ordered to go to the benakab zone. While they need to confess their secret in front of the public and save themselves from nomination. Where Anjali reveals his secret and saved her from nomination. Where the queen questions Siddharth about his inactiveness post fighting with Shivam. Swami has been evicted from the show and said goodbye to the teammates.
9	"Akal Badi Ya Brains"	7 March 2022
The drama begins with a day. Saisha tells their team that doesn't trust the red team as they cheat with them. Sara cleared Shivam it's only friendship nothing else which will be interesting to watch that how deep this friendship will go? Kaidis are allocated with a task where they need to answer a few questions. The team which will give the right answer needs to lift the least weight. Watch Lock Upp on MX Player which team will win the game?
10	"Kisko Milegi Rasoi Ki chabhi"	8 March 2022
Where punishment is over for Siddharth, Saisha, and Shivam. The kaidis got the task from the jailer to get the keys to the kitchen. So which team will win the keys of the kitchen and rule. The contestants need to take two names from the charge sheet and for a twist, they need to take the name from their team. Where they got triggered by teammates' sentiments. Watch which contestant will be nominated for this week?
11	"Lock Upp Main Manaya Women's Day"	9 March 2022
Women's day has been celebrated in jail where kaidis welcomes the acid attack survivor women as the guests. Poonam got the secret task from the jailer against the blue team and she successfully did the task but she is disqualified. Why Poonam has been disqualified from the secret task?
12	"Ab Kya Sab Bhookhe Marenge"	10 March 2022
In the morning drama, begins between the teams that which team will cook the food. Where Payal has a heated conversation with Sara and Shivam because of the food she cooked last night. Where jailor Karan Kundrra is back in the jail and taking the kaidis for a task where they secretly take each team to the location. Where they will play a task "Uchi Hai Building". Which team will win the task and get the immunity for jhol ghar?
13	"Koun Hoga Kurbaan?"	11 March 2022
Where inmates got the task to make 40 flower garlands. While orange team win the game and got the gift which they are eagerly waiting for a long time. Meanwhile, Saisha tells the jailor that she feel demotivated in yesterday's game. Where jailor talks to kaidis about their behavior. Karan asked Saisha to confess her feelings. Munawar is called to jhol ghar where jailor gives a choice to Munawar which make him puzzled? What he will choose between the sister letter or teammates?
14	"Kangana Ne Kiya Expose"	12 March 2022
15	"Koun Hoga Safe?"	13 March 2022
16	"Sara Ka Past Bana Uska Present"	14 March 2022
17	"Kya Sara Aur Ali Suljha Payenge Apna Past?"	15 March 2022
18	"Dono Blocks Ke Beech Ghamasan Takkar"	16 March 2022
19	"Kyun Ho Rahe Jail Mein Personal Attacks?"	17 March 2022
20	"KV Ke Saath Jhol Ghar Ka Khel"	18 March 2022
21	"Lock Upp Mein Holi"	19 March 2022
22	"Will KV's Stupidity come back to Haunt Him?"	20 March 2022
23	"Saisha ko orange team ne kyu kiya target"	21 March 2022
24	"Kya blue team apne shatir game se jetegi?"	22 March 2022
25	"Anjali ne diya Payal ko Mooh Tod Jawab"	23 March 2022
26	"Azma Ne Aate Hi Apna Khel Shuru Kar Diya"	24 March 2022
27	"Nisha Aur Mandana Ka Jal Yudh"	25 March 2022
28	"Chetan Ke Bartav Ka Kya Hoga Natiza"	26 March 2022
29	"Aaj Kiska Secret Hoga Out"	27 March 2022
30	"Koun Hai Jail Ka Sabse Weak Kaidi?"	28 March 2022
31	"Calories Burn Ke Chakkar Me Ho Gai Halat Kharab"	29 March 2022
32	"Left Block Ne Rachi Coins Ki Saazish"	30 March 2022
33	"Atyachaari Arena Mein Kaidiyon Ne Lagayi Aag!"	31 March 2022
34	"Kya Left Block Ubhar Payega Aag Ke Khel Se?"	1 April 2022
35	"Kaidiyon Ko Mila Reality Check"	2 April 2022
36	"The Ultimate Jhol"	3 April 2022
37	"Secret Ballot Ka Khel"	4 April 2022
38	"Hands Up"	5 April 2022
39	"Kuch Kuch Hone Laga Hai"	6 April 2022
40	"Kheench Ke Bunty Bajade Ghanti"	7 April 2022
41	"Ticket To Temptation"	8 April 2022
42	"Aaj Hoga Pappi Ka Khel"	9 April 2022
43	"Kiska Secret Niklega Aur Kaun Hoga Safe?"	10 April 2022
44	"Golden Ticket Ki Chargesheet"	11 April 2022
45	"Kahin Pe Nigahen Kahin Pe Nishana"	12 April 2022
46	"Emotional Damage!"	13 April 2022
47	"Kaun Hai Farzi Actor?"	14 April 2022
48	"Temptation Ki Fight"	15 April 2022
49	"Lock Upp Mein Ekta!"	16 April 2022
50	"Kaun hai Queen ka Hukum ka Ikka?"	17 April 2022
51	"An Eye For An Eye - 1"	18 April 2022
52	"An Eye For An Eye - 2"	18 April 2022
53	"Yeh Toofan Kab Rukega?"	19 April 2022
54	"Ticket to Finale - 1"	20 April 2022
55	"Ticket to Finale - 2"	21 April 2022
56	"Gubbara Bachao!"	22 April 2022
57	"Kya Kalik Badlegi Game?"	23 April 2022
58	"Kiska Hua Time Up?"	24 April 2022
59	"Palang Tod Entertainment"	25 April 2022
60	"Family Karenge Lock In"	26 April 2022
61	"Chargesheet Ki Jung!"	27 April 2022
62	"Bomb Squad"	28 April 2022
63	"Arena Showdown"	29 April 2022
64	"Jail Mein Lagi Queen Ki Kacheri"	30 April 2022
65	"Keechad Uchlega"	1 May 2022
66	"Jeena Haram Kar Dunga"	2 May 2022
67	"Lock Upp Ka Dangal"	3 May 2022
68	"Aakhri Chaap"	4 May 2022
69	"Chhoti Bacchi Hai Kya?"	5 May 2022
70	"Finale Ki Race"	6 May 2022
71	"Grand Finale"	7 May 2022

== Reception ==
=== Critical reception ===
Namrata Thakker of Rediff.com gave the show two and a half stars out of five and wrote that the show looked and sounded like Bigg Boss on the surface, but was not the same.

Akansha Tiwari of Aaj Tak wrote that although Kangana Ranaut was a strong actress, her hosting did not meet expectations.

On 21 March 2022, the show crossed 100 million views in 19 days.
