= Vinit Kakar =

Indian actor

- Born: Vinu
- Education: Mumbai University
- Occupation: Actor
- Known for: RadhaKrishn Chandragupta Maurya Aladdin – Naam Toh Suna Hoga

Vinit Kakar is an Indian film and television actor. He is well-known for portraying various characters in Indian mythology television series and contestant in the first season of Lock Upp.

== Career ==
Currently playing parallel lead role in hasratein season 2 (Aankh Micholi)streaming on Hungama OTT, along with gulki Joshi and vivek dahiya

Playing lead villain in divya prem tv series

In 2015 he played the character of Inspector Dabangg in film Rahasya.

In 2016 he played the character of Mahapaarshav in Sankat Mochan Mahabali Hanumaan

In 2018 he played lead antagonist Dreko in Rudra Ke Rakshak.

In 2019 he played the dual character of Rakhtbeej and Daruk in TV series Devi Adi Parashakti.

In 2019 he played the character Prince Kaivarta in Chandragupta Maurya.

In 2019 he played the character of Haiwan-ae-Iblees in Aladdin-Naam Toh Suna Hoga.

In 2020 he played the character of Meghnad "Indrajeet" in TV series Ram siya ke Luv kush and In the Same Year he Played four different roles of Shishupal, Takshak, Rahu and Aswathama in TV series RadhaKrishn.

In 2022 he was seen as contestant in the first season of Lock Upp host Kangana Ranaut.

He played the lead antagonist in Jogan music album and he played a cop in Kingsman web series.

In 2021 he played the lead Villain in Sony SAB's Show Ziddi Dil Maane Na.

In 2021 he played the central character of Mayasur in And TV's show Baal Shiv – Mahadev Ki Andekhi Gatha.

He played the central character in sikhya entertainment's web crime series Kaun.

He played the central character Aryan in the web series Title Role.

In 2020 he played dual character of Gajmukhasur and Andhakasur in TV series Vignaharta Ganesh.

Vinit was earlier seen as a star player of the reality show Truth Love Cash. and later went on doing an award-winning play One Coin Please

In 2023 he played the lead role of U Tirot sing in TV series Swaraj.

Currently playing Sambrasur in Shrimad Ramayan for Sony Entertainment Television.

== Filmography ==
=== Television ===
| Year | Title | Role | Ref. |
|---|---|---|---|
| 2016 | Sankat Mochan Mahabali Hanumaan | Mahapaarshav | |
| 2017 | Mahakali – Anth Hi Aarambh Hai | Madhu | |
| 2018 | Rudra Ke Rakshak | Drako | |
| 2019 | Aladin Naam toh Suna Hoga | Haiwan-ae-Iblees | |
| 2019 | Chandragupta Maurya | Prince Kaivarta | |
| 2020 | Ram Siya Ke Luv Kush | Meghnad | |
| 2020 | Devi Adi Parashakti | Raktabīja/ Daruk | |
| 2020 | Vighnaharta Ganesh | Gajmukhasur/ Andhakasura | |
| 2020 | Radhakrishna | Shishupala, Takshaka, Rahu, Ashwatthama | |
| 2021 | Ziddi Dil Maane Na | Chirag | |
| 2021 | Baal Shiv – Mahadev Ki Andekhi Gatha | Mayasura | |
| 2023 | Swaraj | U Tirot Sing | |
| 2024 | Shrimad Ramayan | Sambrasur | |
| 2025 | Divya Prem - Pyaar aur Rahasya Ki Kahaani | Macharasur | |
| 2025 | Gatha Shiv Parivaar Ki — Ganesh Kartikey | Simhamukhasur | |
| 2025 | Jagadhatri | Vineet | |

=== Film ===
| Year | Title | Role | Ref. |
|---|---|---|---|
| 2015 | Rahasya | Inspector Dabangg | |

=== Web Series ===
| Year | Title | Role | Ref. |
|---|---|---|---|
| 2022 | Lock Upp Season 1 | Contestant | |
