= Survivor (Hindi TV series) =

Reality Television Show

- Also known as: Survivor India
- Genre: Reality competition
- Creative director: Anuradha Gakhar
- Presented by: Sameer Kochhar
- Country of origin: India
- Original language: Hindi
- No. of seasons: 1
- No. of episodes: 22

Production
- Editor: Umashankar Mishra
- Running time: 35–40 minutes

Original release
- Network: STAR Plus
- Release: 6 January – 17 March 2012

Related
- International versions

Survivor Hindi is an Indian Hindi-language reality television show, which was originally based on Swedish show Expedition Robinson created in 1997 by Charlie Parsons and is part of Survivor India. The series was filmed in the summer of 2011 and premiered on 6 January 2012 on Star Plus. The show was hosted by Sameer Kochhar. The show is produced by Miditech Pvt. Ltd. and is aired on weekend nights. Like many of its counterparts, the show has a set number of contestants stranded on an isolated area for a pre-determined number of days until one remains and is given the title Sole Survivor. Aside from the title, the winner also receives ₹ 10 million.

Survivor India: Caramoan Islands is the first and only season of the series. It was shot on the islands of Caramoan in the Philippines, from mid September to October 2011. Raj Rani was named the winner in the final episode on 17 March 2012, defeating JD Majethia and Stithpragya in a 4–2–1 vote.

== Series details ==
Season	Host	Launch date	Finale date	Days	Castaways	Winner
1	Sameer Kochhar	6 January 2012	17 March 2012	45	22	Raj Rani

== Season summary ==
Twenty two castaways embarked on the journey of a lifetime in the pristine yet treacherous Philippines. The two tribes were pre-selected before the start of the show. The contestants were divided into two tribes by popularity, Catan, which consisted of castaways who were celebrities, and Tayak, which consisted of castaways who were ordinary people. Catan's inaugural victory in the reward challenge caused them to underestimate their opposing tribe's mettle. At the first tribal council faced by the Catan tribe, Sylvie was blindsided by her fellow mates and was voted off. With a great comeback the Catan tribe won the successive challenges gaining consecutive two immunity which resulted in eliminations of two of the female members of the Tayak tribe – Sanober and Gisele. From the tenth day on wards, Tayak dominated in challenges, while the depleted Catan lost Priyanka, Karan, Rishi and Shilpa. Priyanka was sent home for being too manipulative under the game-play adopted by the two masterminds of Catan – Shilpa and Rohit. Karan, due to his worsening health problems, became the first contestant in the history of Survivor India to quit. Ex-Tayak members (Rishi, Raj Rani, Shivam and Stithpragya) who joined Catan after the tribe switch saw a change in their alliance when Shivam voted against Rishi, hence, kicking him out of the game. Shivam decided to side with his initial allies after getting to know of Shilpa's intentions to vote against him. JD's vote against Shilpa resulted in her ouster from the island.

After Rishi's elimination, he was mysteriously secluded to a new island and was told to await further clues for his survival there. From that point on, the outcasts who were vote out of the game, formed a new tribe on the island of Ayunan with the same name. Rajesh and Evelyn were blindsided by their members at Tayak and Michael got voted out for engaging in too many verbal fights with fellow castaways. Soon the tribe consisted of a total of five eliminated contestants. A new twist revealed that the outcasts were being given a chance to make a comeback in the game. After an endurance challenge among the five of them, Michael emerged as the winner and was given the choice to pick one of the four remaining members to join the game again. Michael chose Shilpa for her determination and therefore the game ended for Rishi, Evelyn and Rajesh.

After making a surprise entry in the game, the two returnees are not very warmly welcomed by their ex-tribe mates. Shilpa and Michael, being immune, were safe from the outcome of the next immunity challenge which Tayak ended by losing and facing tribal council for the fourth time in a row. Preeti fell target to Rohit's game-plan and was voted out. Deprived of, almost, all of the rewards offered in the challenges, Tayak tribe members suffered from starvation while Catan enjoyed consecutive feasts. Standing against Munisha both Michael and Sai from Tayak were soon voted off. Shilpa was blindsided by her fellow mates, who vowed not to vote against her, and was sent home.

The ten survivors left witnessed a tribal merge and formed a new tribe named "Walo Walo".

== Tribes ==
The two initial tribes were Catan, represented by a stingray and the color yellow, and Tayak, represented by a shark and the color red. Initially, the Catan tribe consisted of 11 celebrities and Tayak of 11 non-famous people chosen from all over India. Following the tribe switch, the first five eliminated members were mysteriously secluded to the island of Ayunan where they formed a new tribe, competing for a chance to return to the game. The final ten players merged into the Walo Walo tribe, represented by a snake and the color blue.

== Contestants ==
Logo for the Catan tribe depicting a stingray.

Logo for the Tayak tribe depicting a shark.

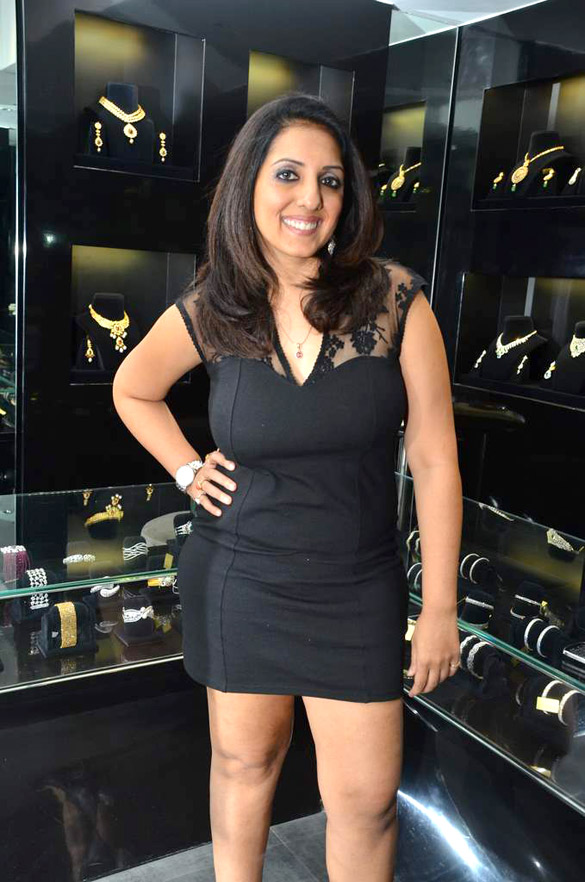
Munisha Khatwani came in seventh place and was the fourth jury member.

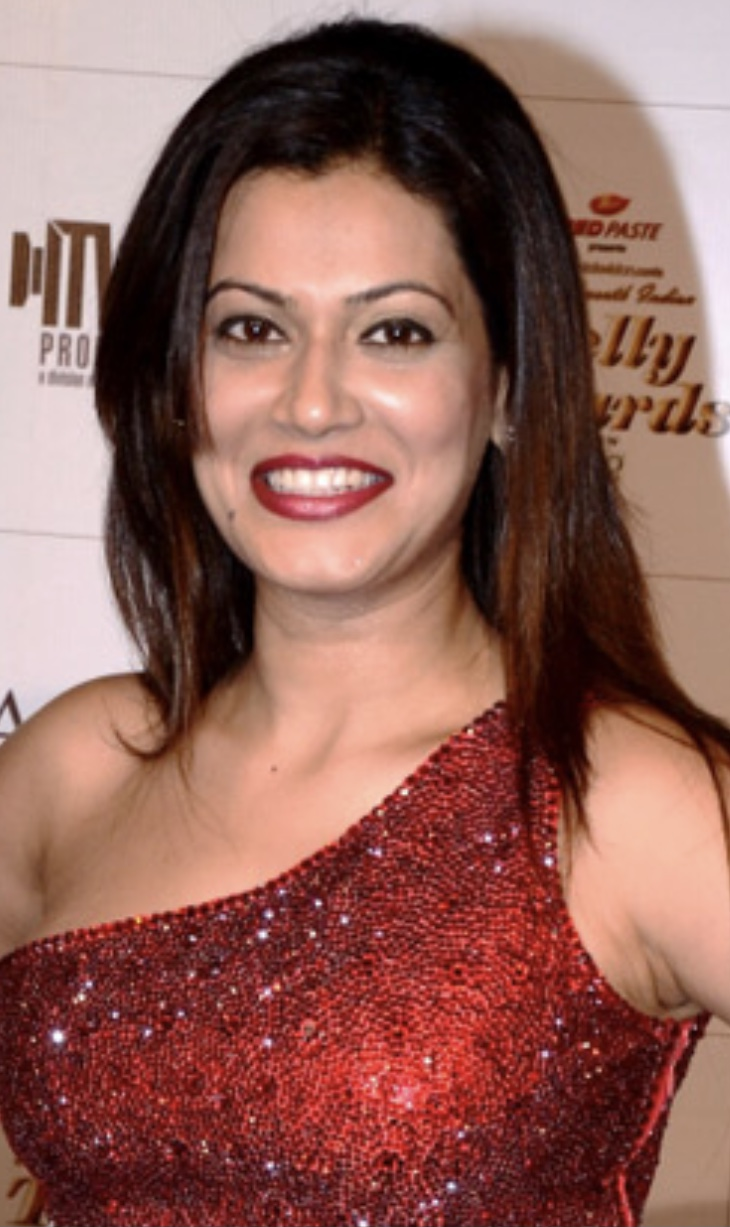
Payal Rohatgi came in sixth place and was the fifth jury member.

Contestant	Original tribe	Switched tribe	Outcast twist	Merged tribe	Finish
Sylvester "Sylvie" Rodgers; Hair Stylist	Catan				1st voted out Day 4
Sanober Pardiwala; Stunt Artist	Tayak				2nd voted out Day 6
Gizele Thakral; Supermodel	Tayak				3rd voted out Day 8
Priyanka Bassi; Actress	Catan				4th voted out Day 10
Karan Patel; 28, Actor	Catan				Quit; Day 12
Rishi Raj; 29, Fashion Stylist	Tayak	Catan	Ayunan (Note: Upon being voted out of the game, the first five castaways after the tribal switch were taken to the Ayunan tribe for a chance to return to the game.)		5th voted out Day 15
Shilpa Saklani; Returned to game	Catan	Catan	Ayunan		6th voted out Day 17
Rajesh Khera; 43, Actor	Catan	Tayak	Ayunan		7th voted out Day 19
Evelyn Sayal; 28, Call Center Employee	Tayak	Tayak	Ayunan		8th voted out Day 21
Michael Durairaj; Returned to game	Tayak	Tayak	Ayunan		9th voted out Day 23
Preeti; 24, DJ	Tayak	Tayak	Tayak		10th voted out Day 25
Michael Durairaj; 43, Research Scientist	Tayak	Tayak	Tayak (Note: Michael and Shilpa returned to the game on Day 24. Upon their return to the game, Michael returned to the Tayak tribe and Shilpa to Catan.)		11th voted out Day 28
Shilpa Saklani; 29, Actress	Catan	Catan	Catan		12th voted out Day 30
Saiprasad "Sai" Gundewar; 33, Actor	Tayak	Tayak	Tayak		13th voted out Day 30
Rohit Narang; 45, Hotel chain owner	Catan	Tayak	Tayak	Walo Walo	14th voted out 1st jury member Day 32
Harrison James; 35, Fitness Trainer	Tayak	Tayak	Tayak	Walo Walo	15th voted out 2nd jury member Day 35
Sangram Singh; 28, Wrestler	Catan	Catan	Catan	Walo Walo	16th voted out 3rd jury member Day 37
Munisha Khatwani; 31, Tarot card reader	Catan	Tayak	Tayak	Walo Walo	17th voted out 4th jury member Day 39
Payal Rohatgi; 33, Actress / Model	Catan	Catan	Catan	Walo Walo	18th voted out 5th jury member Day 41
Abhinav Shukla; 29, Actor	Catan	Tayak	Tayak	Walo Walo	19th voted out 6th jury member Day 42
Shivam Singh; 23, Student	Tayak	Catan	Catan	Walo Walo	20th voted out 7th jury member Day 43
Sthitpragya Mohan; 25, NRI Radio Jockey	Tayak	Catan	Catan	Walo Walo	2nd runner-up
Jamandas "JD" Majethia; 45, Actor / Producer	Catan	Catan	Catan	Walo Walo	Runner-up
Raj Rani; 25, Field hockey player	Tayak	Catan	Catan	Walo Walo	Sole Survivor

The Total Votes is the number of votes a castaway has received during Tribal Councils where the castaway is eligible to be voted out of the game. It does not include the votes received during the final Tribal Council.

== Castaways status ==
Sr	Castaways name	Day arrived on main island	Day exited island	Status of the castaways
1	Rani	Day 1	Day 50	Sole Survivor
2	Jamandas	Day 1	Day 50	Runner up
3	Sthitpragya	Day 1	Day 50	2nd runner-up
4	Shivam	Day 1	Day 43	Eliminated
5	Abhinav	Day 1	Day 42	Eliminated
6	Payal	Day 1	Day 41	Eliminated
7	Munisha	Day 1	Day 39	Eliminated
8	Sangram	Day 1	Day 37	Eliminated
9	Harrison	Day 1	Day 35	Eliminated
10	Rohit	Day 1	Day 32	Eliminated
11	Saiprasad	Day 1	Day 30	Eliminated
12	Shilpa	Day 1	Day 30	Eliminated
13	Michael	Day 1	Day 28	Eliminated
14	Preeti	Day 1	Day 25	Eliminated
15	Michael	Day 1	Day 23	Eliminated
16	Evelyn	Day 1	Day 21	Eliminated
17	Rajesh	Day 1	Day 19	Eliminated
18	Shilpa	Day 1	Day 17	Eliminated
19	Rishi	Day 1	Day 15	Eliminated
20	Karan	Day 1	Day 12	Quit
21	Priyanka	Day 1	Day 10	Eliminated
22	Gizele	Day 1	Day 8	Eliminated
23	Sanober	Day 1	Day 6	Eliminated
24	Sylvie	Day 1	Day 4	Eliminated

== Season summary ==
Episode	Air date	Challenges		Eliminated	Vote	Finish
Episode	Air date	Reward	Immunity	Eliminated	Vote	Finish
1	6 January 2012	Catan	None			No Vote out
2	7 January 2012	Tayak^{1}		Sylvie	10–1	1st Voted Out; Day 4
3	8 January 2012	Catan^{1}		Sanober	8–2–1	2nd Voted Out; Day 6
4	14 January 2012	Catan^{1}		Gisele	7–2–1	3rd Voted Out; Day 8
5	15 January 2012	Tayak^{1}		Priyanka	6–2–1–1	4th Voted Out; Day 10
6	21 January 2012	Tayak^{1}		Karan	No vote	Quit; Day 12
7	22 January 2012	Tayak	None			No Vote out
8	28 January 2012	None	Tayak	Rishi	5–3	5th Voted out Day 15
9	29 January 2012	Tayak^{1}		Shilpa	4–3	6th Voted out Day 17
10	4 February 2012	Tayak	Catan	Rajesh	4–4–1; 4–3	7th Voted out Day 19
11	5 February 2012	Catan^{1}		Evelyn	7–1	8th Voted out Day 21
12	11 February 2012	Catan^{1}		Michael	4–3	9th Voted out Day 23
13	12 February 2012	None	Michael, [Shilpa]	Preeti	4–3	10th Voted Out; Day 25
13	12 February 2012	None	Catan	Preeti	4–3	10th Voted Out; Day 25
14	18 February 2012	Catan^{1}		Michael	4–2	11th Voted Out; Day 28
15	19 February 2012	Catan	None	Shilpa	6–1	12th Voted Out; Day 30
15	19 February 2012	Catan	None	Sai	3–2	13th Voted Out; Day 30
16	25 February 2012	None^{2}	Raj Rani	Rohit	6–4	14th Voted Out; 1st Jury Member; Day 32
17	26 February 2012	Sangram	Raj Rani	Harrison	5–4	15th Voted Out; 2nd Jury Member; Day 35
18	3 March 2012	Survivor; Auction	JD	Sangram	5–1–1–1	16th Voted Out; 3rd Jury Member; Day 37
19	4 March 2012	Shivam, [Sthitpragya]	Abhinav	Munisha	5–2	17th Voted Out; 4th Jury Member; Day 39
20	10 March 2012	Abhinav, [Sthitpragya, Raj Rani]	Abhinav	Payal	4–2	18th Voted Out; 5th Jury Member; Day 41
21	11 March 2012	None	JD	Abhinav	4–1	19th Voted Out; 6th Jury Member; Day 42
21	11 March 2012	None	Sthitpragya	Shivam	2–2^{3}	20th Voted Out; 7th Jury Member; Day 43
22	17 March 2012	Jury Vote		Sthitpragya	4–2–1	2nd Runner-Up
22	17 March 2012	Jury Vote		JD	4–2–1	Runner-Up
22	17 March 2012	Jury Vote		Raj Rani	4–2–1	Sole Survivor

^1 Combined Reward and Immunity challenge.
^2 There was no Reward Challenge due to the tribal merge.

== Episodes ==
=== Episode 1 (6 January) ===
- Reward Challenge: Both teams had to divide their members into two groups of eighth and three. The group consisting of eighth people shall dive into the water and bring a wooden cart to the shore undergoing through an obstacle course while bringing it. Next they had to unlock two wheels tied to a pole to make the carriage easy to run. Then they had to unlock the cart to reveal puzzle pieces which shall be joined together by the other three members awaiting them to form a board with their tribe name printed on it.

- Reward : Fire kit, ground nuts and pulses.

Sameer Kochchar, the host of Survivor India, welcomes 22 competitors who are to be marooned for 45 days in the exotic yet dangerous Caramoan islands in Philippines, without food, drinking water, shelter, technology and civilization. The competitors must salvage food and shelter and survive the island and each other. The 22 competitors are divided into two tribes of eleven, celebrities against ordinary people, and they will reside in two separate islands. The Catan tribe, with the yellow bandana, consists of Payal, Karan, Shilpa, Rohit, Rajesh, Sangram, Abhinav, JD, Priyanka, Munisha and Sylvie. The Tayak tribe, with the red bandana, consists of Raj, Rishi, Shivam, Michael, Preeti, Gisele, Sanober, Harrison, Evelyn, Sthitpragya and Sai. The two tribes face a reward challenge.

=== Episode 2 (7 January) ===
- Reward/Immunity Challenge: Due to Gisele's foot injury she was unable to participate in the challenge. Therefore, the Catan tribe had to exclude a member of their team from the Reward cum immunity challenge. Catan tribe chose Sylvie, hence Sylvie and Gisele did not take part in the challenge. Both tribes had to divide their team members into five groups of two. Each group shall one by one topple a block, with segments of their tribe name printed on each, from the many placed on the shore. Once all the required blocks were procured, the tribe had to assemble them to make a staircase in a way that their tribe name should appear correctly on the side of the stairs. Once constructed, all the members had to climb the staircase, reach the top and release their tribe flag. Winners were given a choice to choose from either a basket full of fruits or the fire kit. The tribe chose Fire kit.

- Reward: A fruit basket. (If Tayak wins, they get a choice between this and a fire kit)

In Tayak tribe, Preeti's tribemates allay her fear and convince her to stay in the competition. Michael accuses his tribemates of stealing his footwear to sabotage him. Failing to start a fire, Tayak tribe eats raw rice to survive. In Catan tribe, JD and Abhinav have a disagreement over boating. After 3 days, the two tribes meet for an Immunity cum Reward challenge. Gisele from Tayak tribe, abstains from participating in the challenge due to an injury. Tayak tribe wins the immunity challenge and chooses fire kit as their reward. Michael scares his tribemates with his tantrum. JD's tribemates find him domineering. After losing the immunity challenge, Catan tribe faced tribal council. Sylvie's incompetent skills in the challenges due to her old age lead to her vote out by 10–1.

=== Episode 3 (8 January) ===
- Reward/Immunity Challenge: After voting out Sylvie Catan tribe was left with ten members and in order to equal members on both sides Tayak tribe was told to exclude one member of their tribe from participating in the challenge. The task took place on an inclined field with obstacles during the course and numbered goal posts at the end. The task required both tribe to divide their team into three groups namely Throwers, Blockers and Callers. The throwers will toss a ball-shaped structure into the field hoping to throw it in a direction that it would land in one of the goal posts in order to receive points. The blockers were blindfolded and had to stop the ball of their opposing team from reaching a goalpost. The callers were giving the task to call out directions to the blocker of their team to assist them in successfully defending the goalpost. Winners were given a choice to choose from either a basket full of fruits or the fishing gear. The tribe chose to go with fruits.

- Reward: A basket of fruits containing Bananas and Pineapples.

Fourth night on the island and Michael's aggression gets to the Tayak tribemates. Meanwhile, the Catan tribemates try to salvage their clothes and food from pouring rain. Payal uses up clean water to bathe, leaving her tribemates without drinking water. Michael's generous eating habit depletes Tayak tribe's food ration. The two tribes meet for an immunity cum reward challenge. Catan tribe wins the challenge with the most game points and chooses fruit basket as their reward. While Catan tribe enjoys the delicious fruits, Tayak tribe decides to vote Michael or Sanober off the game. Enmity between Gisele and Sanober intensifies. After losing the challenge, Tayak tribe faced Tribal council and Sanober was voted out 8–2–1.

=== Episode 4 (14 January) ===
- Reward / Immunity Challenge: Eight members from each tribe were to participate, hence, Payal and Munisha from Catan tribe and Gisele and Preeti from Tayak tribe were excluded from the challenge. The raft which was built by five tribe members from both the tribes prior to the challenge was to be used by two of the members who built it to reach out to four platforms situated far out on the sea. Traveling via the raft three tribe members, seated on the platforms, and sandbags, placed on the fourth, were to be boarded onto the raft and brought back to the shore. The sandbags were then to be thrown onto ten platforms by the remaining three members attempting to land the bags on them. The tribe to place the sandbags onto all platforms the fastest would win.

- Reward: Mats, Bed sheets and Pillows.

Pouring rain, dwindling food and rats take a toll on the two tribes. In Tayak tribe, Michael impressed his tribe mates by kindling fire in pouring rain. Catan tribe has a bad start when their precious watermelon decays. The two tribes form a five members team each and build a raft for their immunity challenge. Evelyn abstained from participating because of being overweight. Samir Kochchar imparts a tragic news to Gisele. Gisele was conflicted about leaving the competition for her sick grandmother, but eventually refused to quit the show. After losing the challenge, Tayak tribe faced Tribal council. Gisele's inability to take part in challenges because of her injury lead to her eventual vote out by 7–2–1.

=== Episode 5 (15 January) ===
- Reward/Immunity Challenge: After voting out Gisele, Tayak and Catan tribes were left with nine and ten tribe members respectively. Hence, to equal players on both sides, Priyanka was excluded from participating in the challenge. The task involved tribe members to, one by one, throw a ball into a goalpost which had to be guarded by one member from the opposing tribe standing on a short platform in the middle of the lake. The tribe to score five points the fastest would win the challenge. Rajesh and Shivam decided to be goalkeepers for their teams while others became throwers.

- Reward: Tea, Sugar, Cream and Chocolate chip Cookies.

Roosters flock the island and delight the non-vegetarians in both the tribes. Tayak tribe celebrates their first egg while Catan tribe dreams of chicken meat. Payal sets about cleaning the island to make a better impression on her tribe mates. Meanwhile, Karan and Priyanka form a close bond. Their relationship becomes a hot topic for gossip among the Catan tribe mates. The two tribes meet for an immunity challenge. After losing the challenge, Catan tribe faced Tribal council. Priyanka's tribe mates found her manipulative and she was voted out 6–2–1–1.

=== Episode 6 (21 January) ===
- Reward/Immunity Challenge: Both tribes had to divide their teams into two groups of four and five. The five tribe members had to throw coconuts into the opposing tribe's basket which shall be gripped and pulled by the four members of the opposite tribe. The tribe whose basket can no longer be gripped by their tribe mates and falls to the ground shall lose with the victory going to the opposite tribe.

- Reward: Spices and Onions. As the winning team, Tayak tribe was given an opportunity to make one of the member from the Catan tribe their servant for a 24 hours, Tayak chose Shilpa.

Day eleven in Tayak tribe, Michael finds sweet potatoes growing on the island. While his tribe mates savour the potatoes, Evelyn and Preeti have an altercation that ends in tears. Catan tribe splits into two after Priyanka is voted off the game. While Shilpa, JD and Payal rejoice Priyanka's departure, Karan forms a group with Rajesh and Abhinav. The two tribes meet for an immunity cum reward challenge. After losing the challenge, Catan tribe faced Tribal council. Munisha's bad performance in challenges and Karan's deteriorating health, made them ideal candidates for the vote out, however, Karan's inability to cope with the living conditions that developed because of losing two reward challenges in a row leading to Catan running short of food forced him to quit the game, hence, no vote occurred for his removal.

=== Episode 7 (22 January) ===
- Reward Challenge: After losing Karan, Catan was left with eight members hence, in order to equal participants on both sides, Evelyn was asked to sit out of the reward challenge. The challenge involved tribe members to slide on a slippery slope, against a member from the opposite tribe, both attempting to snatch a ball from the hanging clothes with numbers on them. At the start of the challenge Sameer would call a number from whose cloth the ball was to be snatched. After grabbing the ball, the tribe mate who successfully lands it into a basket wins a point. The tribe who goals eight points first wins the challenge.

- Reward: A lunch of Pakodas and Mint chutney prepared by a chef along with Chilled ice tea served on an exotic location.

- Tribe Switch: The two tribes are asked to evaluate their tribe mates on paper to form new Tayak and Catan tribes. The new Tayak tribe consisted of Harrison, Rohit, Sai, Abhinav, Michael, Rajesh, Preeti, Munisha and Evelyn. The new Catan tribe consisted of Sangram, Sthitpragya, Shilpa, Shivam, JD, Raj Rani, Payal and Rishi. The two tribes received fresh food provisions for their new start.

Raj Rani impresses Shilpa with her spicy sweet potatoes. While Tayak tribe savours chicken soup, Catan tribe wallows in hunger and two consecutive defeats. Michael gifts a jar of salt to Shilpa. Day thirteen on the island, the two tribes met for an exclusive reward challenge.

=== Episode 8 (28 January) ===
- Immunity Challenge: To equal tribe members on both tribes, Rajesh was asked to sit out of the challenge. The task required both tribes to send one of their team member into an open wrestling platform floating on the water while others stand out of the ring. The two opposing members had to wrestle each other using a pillow in an attempt to throw the other into the water. The member who does this successfully scores a point for their team. The team who collects five points the fastest wins.

Formation of new Tayak and Catan tribes evokes mixed feelings in the Survivor India contestants. Shilpa forms an alliance with the remaining celebrities in the new Catan tribe. JD finds Sthitpragya, Raj Rani and Shivam's youthful vigor refreshing. The two tribes meet for an immunity challenge. Shilpa's cheer for Tayak tribe upsets JD. After losing the challenge, Catan tribe faced Tribal council. Rishi's new tribe mates found him weak in challenges and he was voted out 5–3. Rishi was then marooned on a secluded island called Ayunan to form a third tribe consisting of the eliminated tribe members after his vote-out onwards.

=== Episode 9 (29 January) ===
- Reward/Immunity Challenge: To equal participants to both sides, two tribe members from Tayak were told to sit out of the challenge. The task required both tribes to divide their team members into two groups of three and four. One castaway would be strapped into a wooden spherical cage and would have to guide two blindfolded castaways in rolling the cage through a maze through the forest to retrieve a steel ball situated at the end of the course and come back to give it two the four members to add it to a labyrinth-like table maze. The castaway inside the cage would then have to guide four blindfolded castaways in solving the table maze. The first tribe to finish the table maze would win. After a close competition.

- Reward: Milk and Chocolate cake.

Shivam's deceit by voting Rishi off the island leaves Raj Rani and Sthitpragya distressed. All alone in the Ayunan tribe, with no tribe mates or any other resources to survive, Rishi goes frantic. An immunity and reward challenge is set up between the two tribes. After losing the challenge, Catan tribe faced Tribal council. Ex-Tayak members along with JD chose to blindside Shilpa and she was voted out 4–3. Like Rishi, Shilpa was also marooned on the discrete island of Ayunan and told to await further clues about her survival there.

=== Episode 10 (4 February) ===
- Reward Challenge: Both teams had to construct a usable loo within five hours using the materials provided. The tribe with the most functional and beautifully crafted bathroom wins.

- Reward : Garnier Fructis products including Shampoo, Conditioner and soap and toilet paper.

- Immunity Challenge: A tribe member would sit on a spinning platform at one end of the playing field. A tribe member from the opposing tribe would grab a rope and pull it to the starting line. The rope would be wound around the base of the platform, causing the platform to spin as the rope is unwound. When the "puller" returned to the finish line, the sitting tribe member, now dizzy, would have to race across a balance beam to the finish line. The tribes would race against each other in rounds with the first dizzy tribe member across the finish line scoring one point for their tribe. The first tribe to score three points would win.

After losing the challenge, Tayak tribe faced Tribal council. For the first time in the history of Survivor India, a tie resulted at the council after which a tie-breaker re-voting occurred between Rajesh and Michael. Rohit chose to betray his alliance with Rajesh and changed his vote from Evelyn to Rajesh. This resulted in Rajesh getting voted out and sent to the island of Ayunan.

=== Episode 11 (5 February) ===
In Tayak tribe, Abhinav doubts Rohit's intentions. In Ayunan tribe, Rajesh tells Shilpa about Rohit's betrayal. In Catan tribe, while JD forms an alliance with the non celebrities, Payal and Sangram's friendship grows stronger.

- Reward/Immunity Challenge: Each tribe gets ten puzzle pieces of which six may be floating in the sea and four buried in the soil. One tribe member at a time will swim out, dive down, unclip a puzzle piece, and bring it back to the puzzle frame or may choose to dig a piece out of the sand. Once the piece is collected, the next person can go out. When all ten of the puzzle pieces have been retrieved, two tribe members may start assembling the puzzle and form the desired result. First tribe to get it together correctly wins the Reward and immunity.

- Reward: Sandwich and Orange juice buffet.

After losing the challenge, Tayak tribe faced Tribal council. Evelyn's proud nature despite her failing attempts at the challenges made her underestimate Munisha's bonding with her tribe members. With the vote of 7–1 Evelyn was blindsided by her fellow mates and was voted off the island and marooned to Ayunan with Rishi, Shilpa and Rajesh.

=== Episode 12 (11 February) ===
- Reward/Immunity Challenge: One at a time, a castaway would jump over a floating platforms and then swim across the sea, climb up a tower, and then jump off the tower to smash a tile. The smashed tile would release a number which the castaway would retrieve. Once five numbers were retrieved, one castaway would use the numbers to figure a code which would unlock a box that contained a two balls. One castaway would then toss one ball at a time to break five tiles. The first tribe to break all five tiles would win.

- Reward: A trip to a Karaoke bar and lunch consisting of burgers, potato wafers and cold drinks.

The Tayak tribe starves as their food stock dwindles. They utilize the preserved chicken to satiate their hunger. In Catan, Sangram receives birthday wishes from his tribe mates. Tayak and Catan meet for immunity cum reward challenge. Tayak tribe, in the beginning, took a heavy lead when Catan tribe members missed a couple of shots at smashing the tiles, however, a great comeback from the Catan tribe resulted in them becoming the winners of the challenge and the immunity. Munisha, due to her leg injury and to equal members on both sides, was asked to sit out of the challenge. After losing the challenge, Tayak tribe faced Tribal council. Rohit's strategy to eliminate the original Tayak members proved successful once again and with the vote of 4–3 against Preeti, Michael was voted out and sent to Ayunan.

=== Episode 13 (12 February) ===
- Aar Ya Paar Challenge: Ayunan tribe mates faced an endurance challenge to get back in the game. The castaways would brace themselves with their arms between two walls while standing barefoot on two foot pegs. Every 15 minutes, the castaways would move down to smaller foot pegs. When the castaways reached the third set of foot pegs, they would try to remain on them as long as they could. The last castaway to remain on their pegs would win. Michael wins the challenge and choose Shilpa to share the prize with, he opted to join the Tayak tribe, which put Shilpa back in Catan. After the end of the challenge Sameer congratulated both of the outcasts of their return in the game and presented each a bag of wheat and pickle to share with their tribe mates.

For Rishi, Evelyn and Rajesh it was the end of the road in Survivor India.

- Immunity Challenge: One castaway from each tribe would be a caller to navigate their blindfolded tribe members through a maze to collect scattered puzzle pieces. Once all pieces were collected, the blindfolded members shall put off their blindfolds and assemble the pieces to form three puzzles. The first tribe to solve all puzzles would win.

The two tribes meet for an immunity challenge which the Catan tribe wins. After losing the challenge, Tayak tribe faced Tribal council. Rohit's manipulation of votes and Munisha's bonding with her tribe members proved successful once again and with the vote of 4–3 Preeti was voted off the island.

=== Episode 14 (18 February) ===
- Reward/Immunity Challenge: One tribemate from each tribe would throw a fire ball using a pole into a square basket which would ignite once the fire ball lands on it. The first tribe to burst all the baskets would win.

- Reward: Raincoats and a feast on local Filipino cuisine in a nearby village.

Day twenty six, Tayak tribe is lacking food and stamina. JD tries to win back Payal and Sangram's trust. The two tribes are assaulted by incessant pouring rain throughout the night. The tribe meet for a challenge. To equal members on both tribes Shilpa from Catan sat out of the challenge. JD and Shivam play strong at the challenge accompanied by a score from Harrison from Tayak who accidentally threw the ball in Catan's basket. Catan wins the immunity cum reward challenge. For the first time in Survivor India, due to a cyclone, tribal council was held in Tayak Island where Michael was voted off the island 4–2.

=== Episode 15 (19 February) ===
- Reward Challenge: The reward challenge required one tribemate from each tribe that would launch balls from a slingshot while the remaining tribemembers have to catch the balls with handheld nets. Catching a ball would score one point for their tribe. The first tribe to reach five points would win.

- Reward: Veg and Non-veg Kebabs, but to be eaten while watching the losing team's Tribal Council. However, one member will be voted out from the winning tribe before the reward is distributed.

After four days of cyclone, the two tribes return to their respective islands to witness nature's destruction. They set about re-building shelter and removing the debris. The survivors remain stoic in the face of destruction but break down on receiving letters from their beloved ones. As the tribes arrived for the Reward Challenge, Sameer shocked them, saying that whoever wins, both tribes would go to Tribal Council to vote someone out. To equal members on both tribes Payal and Raj Rani from Catan sat out of the challenge. Catan tribe won the challenge. Later at Catan Tribal Council, Shilpa was perceived as a manipulative politician and was again voted out 6–1. While watching Tayak's sixth straight Tribal Council, Catan tribe hungrily consumed the kebabs without any compunction. Sai fell target to the power of Rohit, Abhinav and Munisha's alliance and was voted out 3–2.

=== Episode 16 (25 February) ===
- Immunity Challenge: In the first round, the castaways would race across a series of balance beams carrying a bag of puzzle blocks. The first six castaways to bring their bags would go to the second round in which each player must face a series of tricky balance beams. Half of the castaways move to the final round where each player has to stack all of their pieces like a line of domino tiles. Once all of the blocks were properly stacked, the castaway would start a chain reaction which would release a ball into a bucket and, hence, releasing their flag. The first castaway to raise their flag would win.

Day thirty two, Catan and Tayak tribes are united to form a new tribe called "Walo Walo" consisting of the existing ten survivors. After a fulfilling meal of Indian food, the survivors worry about forming new alliances. Walo Walo tribe mates meet for an individual immunity challenge which Rajrani wins. After a lot of deliberation, Rohit's tactics were soon figured out by his tribe mates and he was voted out 6–4.

=== Episode 17 (26 February) ===
- Reward Challenge: Under a time pressure of ten minutes, tribe members were to dive into a mud pit and cover their body with as much mud as they could, then race back and scrape it off into a bucket. They may not carry mud in their arms or in their hands; they were to only use their body. Then Sameer Kochhar would weigh each bucket. The castaway that owned the heaviest bucket wins Reward.

- Reward: Garnier Fructis products, an exclusive lunch and the power to decide what the remaining castaways would eat.

- Immunity Challenge: All castaways were to hold on to a totem pole using their hands and legs. After two hours of stay on the pole the difficulty level would be raised and the castaway shall only be allowed to use one of their hands to hold the pole. Touching the pole with both hands would result in disqualification from the challenge. The castaway to grab onto on the pole the longest would win individual immunity.

Day thirty four, WaloWalo tribe mates meet for an exclusive reward challenge. Sangram wins the challenge and is rewarded with cosmetics. The survivors are served a feast and Sangram is given the right to allot a specific dish to each of his tribe mates. For the second time in a row, Raj Rani wins the immunity challenge. After a lot of deliberation, the survivors face the tribal council where Rohit sits as the first jury member and Harrison is voted out of the game over Sthitpragya in a close 5–4 vote despite Sangram betraying his original alliance.

=== Episode 18 (3 March) ===
- Survivor Auction: Each contestant will be given 10000. Highest bidder gets the item. Survivors may not share the item won unless allowed. The auction will end without notice.

Contestants	Item(s)
Abhinav	Nothing
JD	Puri Bhaji (₹ 4600), A sealed container with a note that will help him at the next Immunity Challenge (₹ 4000)
Munisha	Parathas and Lassi (₹ 6000)
Payal	Samosas and Jaljeera (₹ 2000), Mango Cake to share with two other castaways (₹ 2000)
Raj Rani	Son Papdi and a Bath with Garnier Fructis products (₹ 5000)
Sangram	Nothing
Shivam	Nothing
Sthitpragya	Live Octopus (₹ 5000), Coconut Malaai (₹ 4000)

- Immunity Challenge: A rope having three knots was tied to a pole floating in the ocean. The castaways would start by holding on to the first knot and would advance to the next knot at specific time intervals. The individual to hold on to the last knot the longest would win individual immunity. JD, having the advantage of the item he had bought at the auction, would stay one knot ahead of the others. So, when the other castaways were holding on to the third knot, he would be holding on to the second knot.

Day thirty six, the remaining eight survivors were given ten thousand rupees to participate in a fun auction where Samir Kochchar auctions off food and cosmetics. JD wins an advantage for the immunity challenge in the auction. Payal breaks the alliance with JD's group after the blow up between Rajrani and her. To win back Rajrani's alliance, Sangram apologizes for voting against Sthitpragiya in the previous tribal council. Walo Walo tribe mates meet for a solo immunity challenge. JD wins the challenge and gains immunity. Sangram succeeds at professing his love to Payal, however, fails at convincing his tribe mates not to vote against him. Payal and Raj Rani indulge into a heated argument with each other. Eventually, Sangram was voted out 5–1–1–1 against Payal, Shivam and Raj Rani.

=== Episode 19 (4 March) ===
- Reward Challenge: Each Castaway would form a team of two with their respective friends and family. The castaway must fill a bucket with sea water and throw it to their counterpart who would transfer the water into another bucket. The duo must attempt to fill the final bucket with water to the extent that it would raise a flag due to its new weight.

- Reward: Some time to spend with their friends and family on an exotic location accompanied by sandwiches, muffins and cupcakes.

- Immunity Challenge: Each castaway shall construct a stable 9 ft. tower using a stack of tiles under the time pressure of 30 minutes, however if none of the castaways succeeds in reaching the desired height, the castaway with the highest tower would win solo immunity.

Day 38, the remaining seven survivors are overwhelmed when their family members come to meet them. The tribe mates and their families face an exclusive reward challenge. Shivam and his father win the challenge and are rewarded with a picnic at an exotic spot on the island. Shivam shares the picnic with Sthitpragiya and his brother. Walo Walo tribe mates meet for an immunity challenge, which Abhinav wins. The survivors face the tribal council and Munisha is voted out 5–2.

=== Episode 20 (10 March) ===
- Reward Challenge: Each person will swim out to a long plank with seven symbols on it resting on the ocean floor. They will have to memorize the symbols in order and race back to the beach, where they will try to replicate those symbols, in order, on their answer board. The first person to solve the puzzle correctly wins Immunity.

- Reward : A Chopper ride to an exotic resort and spa in Philippines, Misibis Bay Resort and Casino.

Day forty, the remaining six survivors meet for an exclusive reward challenge. Abhinav wins the challenge and chooses to share his reward with Sthitpragya and Rajrani. While they indulge in the luxury, Payal, JD, and Shivam discuss elimination strategy. Raj Rani thanks Abhinav for giving her a memorable birthday. Walo Walo tribe mates meet for a solo immunity challenge. Abhinav wins immunity two times in a row. After a lot of deliberation, Payal is voted off the game 4–2.

=== Episode 21 (11 March) ===
- Immunity Challenge: Each castaway would have to balanced a ball on a wooden disk. At regular intervals, a ball would be added until the castaway would be balancing three balls. Should any of the balls fall off the disk, the castaway would be out of the challenge. The last castaway to not drop a ball would win.

JD wins the immunity challenge on day 42. Raj Rani, JD, Shivam, and Sthitpragya remain loyal to their group and vote against Abhinav at the tribal council. On day 43, Sthitpragya wins immunity and becomes the first finalist of Survivor India. Sthitpragya and Shivam decide that Raj Rani is a threat and decide to vote against her. However, Sthitpragya, feeling sorry for Raj Rani, decides to tell her that he and others are going to vote her out. Raj Rani is upset by the news and cries. Shivam is angry at Sthitpragya for telling Raj Rani. JD, however, thought Raj Rani was the most deserving player to win Survivor and that it was unfair to vote her out. He secretly tells her to vote against Shivam. At tribal council, Raj Rani and Shivam tie with two votes each. Raj Rani wins the tie-breaker and Shivam is out of the game. Back at camp, Sthitpragya is upset at JD for his betrayal and gets into an argument with him. The top three finalists burn down their shelters to celebrate the end of their journey on the island.

=== Episode 22 (17 March) ===
Samir Kochchar, the host of Survivor India welcomes the 3 finalists, JD, Raj Rani, and Sthitpragya along with the 7 jury members to the Grand Finale. The 22 survivors reunite to relive their experiences, rivalries and alliances on the show during the 45 days on the Caramoan Islands. The finalists make their speeches before the 7 jury members cast their votes. Raj Rani wins Survivor India and walks away with one crore rupees.

== Voting history ==
	Original tribes					Switched tribes										Merged tribe							
Episode #	2	3	4	5	6	8 (Note: In a new twist the tribe member voted out in this tribal council was mysteriously taken to a separate island called Ayunan to form a new tribe.)	9	10		11	12	13	14	15		16	17	18	19	20	21		
Eliminated	Sylvie	Sanober	Gisele	Priyanka	Karan	Rishi	Shilpa	Tie (Note: The first Tribal Council vote resulted in a tie. Per the rules, a second vote was held where the castaways involved in the tie would not vote and the remaining castaways could only vote for those who tied.)	Rajesh	Evelyn	Michael	Preeti	Michael	Shilpa	Sai	Rohit	Harrison	Sangram	Munisha	Payal	Abhinav	Tie (Note: The first Tribal Council vote resulted in a tie. As there were only four castaways remaining, the two tied castaways competed in a pole holding challenge to resolve the tie.)	Shivam
Votes	10–1	8–2–1	7–2–1	6–2–1–1	Quit (Note: No vote; Karan chose to quit the game due to medical emergency.)	5–3	4–3	4–4–1	4–3	7–1	4–3	4–3	4–2	6–1	3–2	6–4	5–4	5–1–1–1	5–2	4–2	4–1	2–2	Challenge (Note: Shivam lost to Raj Rani in pole holding tiebreaker challenge.)
Voter	Vote																						
Raj Rani		Michael	Michael			Shilpa	Shilpa							Shilpa		Rohit	Harrison	Sangram	Munisha	Payal	Abhinav	Shivam	Win
JD	Sylvie			Priyanka		Rishi	Shilpa							Shilpa		Rohit	Harrison	Sangram	Munisha	Payal	Abhinav	Shivam	
Sthitpragya		Sanober	Michael			Shilpa	Shilpa							Shilpa		Rohit	Harrison	Sangram	Munisha	Payal	Abhinav	Raj Rani	
Shivam		Sanober	Gisele			Rishi	Shilpa							Shilpa		Rohit	Harrison	Sangram	Munisha	Payal	Abhinav	Raj Rani	Lose
Abhinav	Sylvie			Karan				Michael	Michael	Evelyn	Michael	Preeti	Michael		Sai	Shivam	Sthitpragya	Payal	Payal	JD	Shivam		
Payal	Sylvie			Priyanka		Rishi	Shivam							Shilpa		Rohit	Harrison	Raj Rani	Munisha	JD			
Munisha	Sylvie			Priyanka				Michael	Michael	Evelyn	Michael	Preeti	Michael		Sai	Shivam	Sthitpragya	Sangram	Payal				
Sangram	Sylvie			Priyanka		Rishi	Shivam							Shilpa		Rohit	Sthitpragya	Shivam					
Harrison		Sanober	Gisele					Rajesh	Rajesh	Evelyn	Michael	Munisha	Michael		Munisha	Shivam	Sthitpragya						
Rohit	Sylvie			Priyanka				Evelyn	Rajesh	Evelyn	Preeti	Preeti	Michael		Sai	Shivam							
Sai		Sanober	Gisele					Rajesh	Rajesh	Evelyn	Preeti	Munisha	Munisha		Munisha								
Shilpa	Sylvie			Priyanka		Rishi	Shivam							JD									
Michael		Sanober	Gisele					Rajesh	None (Note: Michael and Rajesh were not eligible to vote in the second Tribal Council vote.)	Evelyn	Preeti	Preeti	Munisha										
Preeti		Sanober	Gisele					Rajesh	Rajesh	Evelyn	Michael	Munisha											
Evelyn		Sanober	Gisele					Michael	Michael	Munisha													
Rajesh	Sylvie			Munisha				Michael	None														
Rishi		Michael	Gisele			Shilpa																	
Karan	Sylvie			Payal																			
Priyanka	Sylvie			Munisha																			
Gisele		Sanober	Raj Rani																				
Sanober		Gisele																					
Sylvie	Munisha																						

Jury vote
Finalist	Sthitpragya	JD	Raj Rani
Votes	4–2–1		
Juror	Vote		
Shivam	Sthitpragya		
Abhinav			Raj Rani
Payal		JD	
Munisha			Raj Rani
Sangram		JD	
Harrison			Raj Rani
Rohit			Raj Rani

== Reception ==
The show generally received positive reviews both from the media and the audience IBN Live credited the show as "bold and intriguing" and predicted it to go even beyond India's biggest reality show Bigg Boss.

Survivor India, in its very first week, found place in the Top 10 chart issued by TAM India, with 3.82 points. The show figured was placed No. 8 on the charts. What caught everyone’s attention is that the Star Plus reality show, adapted from the popular American format, scored high without any big Bollywood names on board. The show started on 6 January and its opening numbers beat the figures scored by the likes of Hrithik Roshan (3.7), Preity Zinta (3.3), Akshay Kumar (3.0) and Shah Rukh Khan (2.6) over the last year with their shows Just Dance, Guinness World Records – Ab India Todega, Khatron Ke Khiladi Torchaar and Zor Ka Jhatka: Total Wipeout respectively.

=== Indian Television ratings ===
	Time Span	Rating (average)	Viewers (millions)
Opening	6 January 2012	3.82	16.38
Week			
1	6 to 8 January 2012	2.86	14.62
2	14 to 15 January 2012	1.29	13.52
3	21 to 22 January 2012	0.76	10.13
4	28 to 29 January 2012	0.91	12.67
5	4 to 5 February 2012	0.73	13.81
6	11 to 12 February 2012	0.51	13.06
7	18 to 19 February 2012	0.92	14.12
8	25 to 26 February 2012	0.81	13.87
9	3 to 4 March 2012	0.69	13.80
10	10 to 11 March 2012	1.95	14.56
Finale	17 March 2012	2.41	17.78
