= Yuva Unstoppable =

Indian organisation

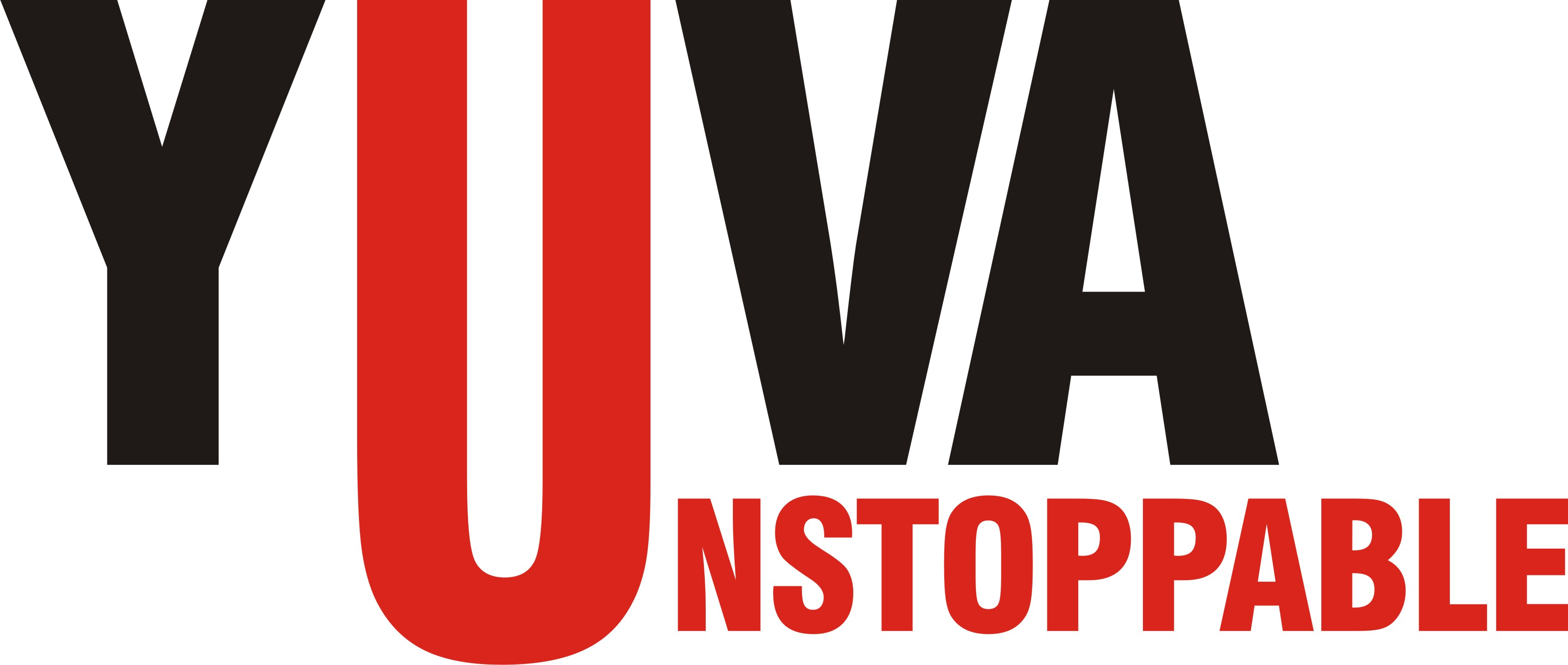
- Formation: 2005
- Founder: Amitabh Shah
- Type: Education, nonprofit organisation
- Purpose: Sanitation, education, children's rights
- Location: Ahmedabad, Gujarat, India
- Website: www.yuvaunstoppable.org

Yuva Unstoppable is a non-governmental organization based in India. It works to provide underprivileged children with access to education, sanitation, drinking water, youth affairs, cleanliness and various non-curricular activities. The organization is spread across thirty cities in India, with 150,000 volunteers. The main initiative Yuva unstoppable is known for making toilets in municipal schools which is the major reason of girls not attending schools after primary education.

== History ==
The organisation was founded by Amitabh Shah in 2005. In 2010, it started operations in Vadodra, Gandhinagar and Surat. By 2011, it had operations in 30 cities in India and had launched in Rajasthan.

On World Toilet Day 2016, India hosted the first Global Citizen Festival outside of New York City.

The Government of Maharashtra, Hindustan Unilever Limited, and Yuva Unstoppable made joint commitments which will affect 559.56 million lives by 2030.

Yuva Unstoppable and wrestler Sangram Singh's foundation have collaborated to improve the physical condition of schools.

== Initiatives ==
=== YUVA : Youth Upliftment Volunteer Association ===
Apj Abdul Kalam Supported the cause and inaugurated Scholarships programs on Yuva Unstoppable's 5th Anniversary.

=== School sanitation ===
In March 2018, Bandra's Anjuman Islam Dr Mohammed Ishaq Jamkhanawala Girls High School and Junior College, a girls' school in Mumbai, got 39 new toilets for its 2,600 students. The toilets were built by Yuva Unstoppable and Zafar Sareshwala’s education movement.

With Rakeysh Omprakash Mehra, Yuva Unstoppable built around 800 toilets in 4 years in Mumbai and Gujarat.

=== School supplies ===
Through School Unstoppable, municipal school children get books, pens, pencils and other stationery items from private schools.

YUVA does not charge participants in its programmes.

=== COVID-19 ===
Rehabilitation Centers

Yuva Unstoppable also joined hands with Delhi Commission of Child Rights Protection (DCPCR) to reduce crime rates triggered by hunger and poverty among the rehabilitated youth in the capital city.

Gujarat Government tied up with Yuva Unstoppable to deliver 1 litre of free edible oil In an attempt to motivate residents to get fully vaccinated against Covid-19

=== Scholarships to Students ===
Yuva unstoppable provides scholarships to all students in India for the people who are good in their academics and have lack of financial resources.

The scholarships are conducted each year where exams are conducted and scholarships provided to students. Along with this scholarships the mentorship is also provided to all selected students from Indian cricketers, Bollywood actors, Writers etc.

Year	Name of scholarships
2022	Laduma Dhamecha Yuva Scholarship Program
2022	Kotak Kanya Scholarship
2020	Janta Mentorship
2017	Udaan 2017
2016	Udaan 2016
2015	Udaan 2015

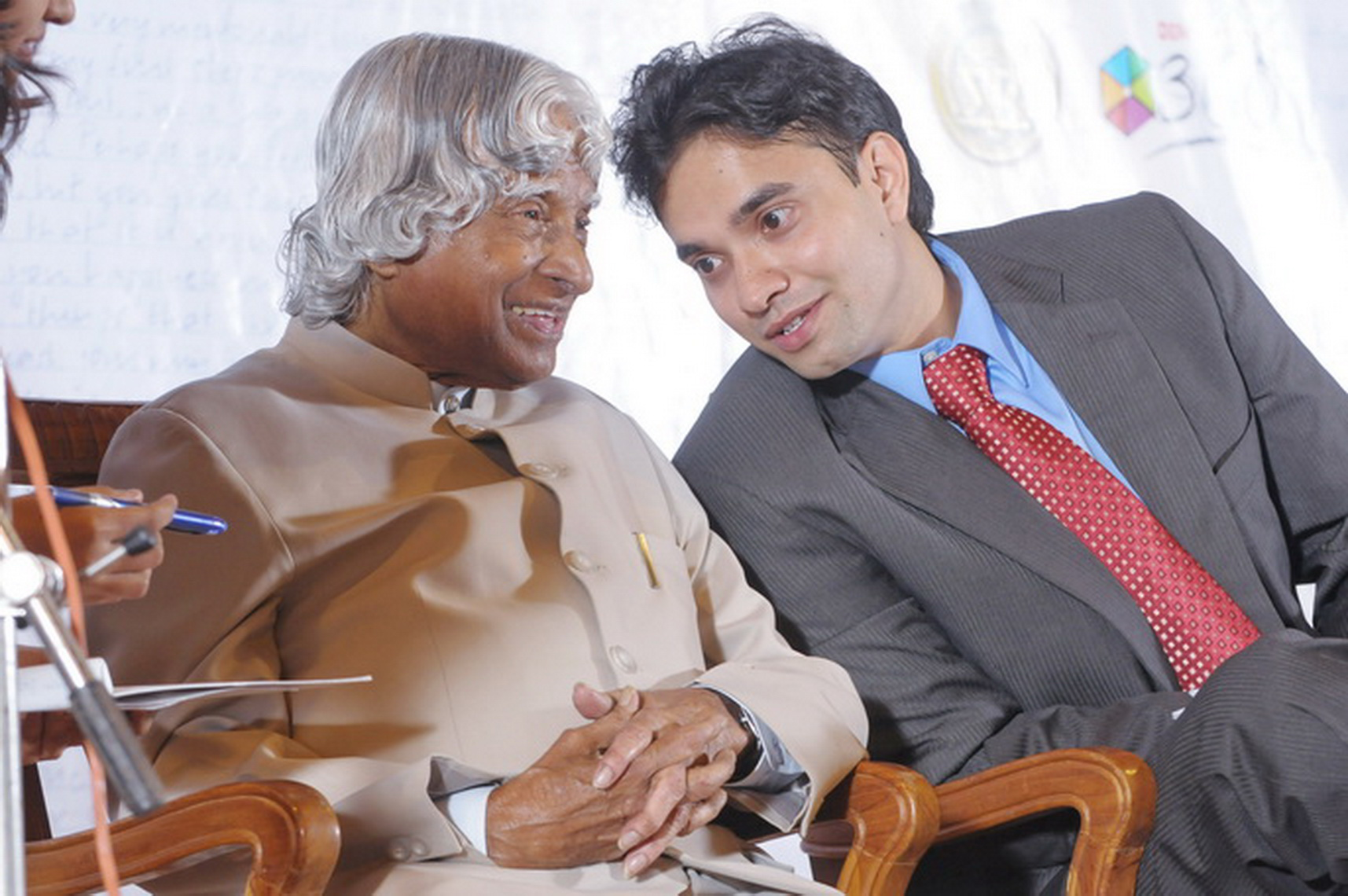
Amitabh Shah with Former Indian President

== Movies & Television ==
=== Mere Pyare Prime Minister ===
A Movie called "Mere Pyare Prime Minister" directed by Rakeysh Omprakash Mehra was inspired by the efforts of Yuva Unstoppable & Amitabh shah's story is available on Netflix.

=== Kaun Banega Crorepati ===
Amitabh Bachchan in the episode with Taarak Mehta Ka Ooltah Chashmah cast played Kaun Banega Crorepati and won 25 Lakhs donation for Yuva Unstoppable.

== Other contributions ==
Yuva Unstoppable's Amitabh shah is in the board & Advisory member of Young India Philanthropic Pledge (YIPP) along with Indian office of Bill and Melinda gates which was founded by Nikhil Kamath
