= Lock Upp (season 2) =

Second season of Indian reality series

Lock Upp: Sach Ya Sazaa
- Season 2
- Hosted by: Farah Khan; Riteish Deshmukh
- No. of contestants: 17
- Winner: Shreya Kalra
- Runner-up: Shivangi Joshi
- Production company: Balaji Telefilms
- No. of episodes: 36

Release
- Original network: Netflix
- Original release: 27 June – 5 August 2026

Season chronology
- ← Previous; Season 1 Next → Season 3

Lock Upp: Sach Ya Sazaa is the second season (Note: Netflix has listed it as Season 1 on its platform.) of the Indian reality series Lock Upp, produced by Ekta Kapoor and Shobha Kapoor under the banner Balaji Telefilms. Hosted by Farah Khan and Riteish Deshmukh, the season premiered on Netflix on 27 June 2026.

The grand finale streamed on 5 August 2026, where Shreya Kalra won the season and received a cash prize of ₹1 crore, and Shivangi Joshi finished as the runner-up.

== Format ==
Contestants, referred to as inmates, are placed inside a jail-themed set where they compete to earn basic necessities, perform tasks, reveal personal truths, and win the heart of the host(s) and audience by showcasing their personalities. In the end, the contestant with the highest votes from a team of selected members from the industry walks away with freedom and the trophy of Lock Upp.

== Inmates status ==
Sr.	Inmate	Charge	Day entered	Day exited	Status
1	Shreya	Badtameez	Day 1	Day 35	Winner
2	Shivangi	Boring	Day 1	Day 35	1st Runner-up
3	Yogesh	Jhutha	Day 1	Day 17	Locked Out
3	Yogesh	Jhutha	Day 24	Day 35	2nd Runner-up
4	Shilpa	Farzi Victim	Day 7	Day 35	3rd Runner-up
5	Ram	Offensive	Day 1	Day 35	4th Runner-up
6	Varun	Bad Influencer	Day 1	Day 32	Locked Out
7	Akanksha Cha.	Attention seeker	Day 1	Day 31	Locked Out
8	Harshad	Ungrateful	Day 1	Day 23	Locked Out
8	Harshad	Ungrateful	Day 24	Day 30	Walked
9	Akanksha Cho.	Makkar	Day 1	Day 28	Locked Out
10	Pamela	Kalesh Queen	Day 1	Day 28	Locked Out
11	Apoorva	Chaalu	Day 21	Day 25	Informer
12	Dheeraj	Ego Friendly	Day 1	Day 24	Locked Out
13	Sufi	Bully	Day 1	Day 24	Locked Out
14	Madhuri	Master Manipulator	Day 1	Day 14	Locked Out
15	Riyaz	Unoriginal	Day 1	Day 11	Locked Out
16	Sunita	Ghar Ka Bhedi	Day 1	Day 11	Bailed
17	Shresta	Privileged Brat	Day 1	Day 6	Locked Out

== Inmates ==
Inmates in order of their appearance.

=== Original entrants ===
- Sunita Ahuja –
- Pamela Serena –
- Shivangi Joshi – Actress, known for Begusarai, Yeh Rishta Kya Kehlata Hai, Barsatein – Mausam Pyaar Ka and Bade Achhe Lagte Hain 4.
- Sufi Motiwala –
- Shreya Kalra –
- Riyaz Aly –
- Shresta Iyer –
- Dheeraj Dhoopar – Actor, known for Sasural Simar Ka and Kundali Bhagya.
- Ram Kapoor – Actor, known for Kasamh Se, Bade Achhe Lagte Hain and Humshakals.
- Yogesh Rawat –
- Akanksha Choudhary –
- Harshad Chopda – Actor, known for Kis Desh Mein Hai Meraa Dil, Tere Liye, Bepannah, Yeh Rishta Kya Kehlata Hai and Bade Achhe Lagte Hain 4.
- Varun "Laila" Yadav –
- Akanksha Chamola –
- Madhuri Jain Grover –

=== Wildcard entrants ===
- Shilpa Shinde – Actress, known for Bhabhi Ji Ghar Par Hai! and Bigg Boss 11.
- Apoorva Mukhija – Content creator, known for storytime videos and The Traitors India.

== Inmates secrets ==
An inmate may voluntarily reveal their secret to avoid weekly chargesheet, Lock Out or to gain an advantage. Every inmate has three secrets and once it is revealed by any means, it is considered used.

Week	Inmate	Secret	Secrets left	Notes
Week 1	Akanksha Chamola	Living separately for 18 months and getting a divorce from her husband, Gaurav Khanna.	2	Premiere Night disadvantage.
Week 1	Harshad Chopda	Got cheated on by his girlfriend with his best friend.	2	Premiere Night disadvantage.
Week 1	Akanksha Choudhary	She had a liking for Yogesh during the Splitsvilla finale but never confessed it.	2	Shared by Sunita to secure herself from Chargesheet.
Week 1	Akanksha Chamola	Identifies herself as Bisexual.	1	Overheard and shared by Shreya Kalra.
Week 1	Madhuri Jain Grover	Desired for third child but didn't conceive due to family pressure.	2	To avoid Lock Out.
Week 2	Ram Kapoor	Molested in boarding school by his senior.	2	To avoid Lock Out.
Week 3	Yogesh Rawat	Used to steal items from Malls.	2	Task disadvantage.
Week 3	Harshad Chopda	Self-harmed after his partner cheated on him.	1	To avoid Lock Out.
Week 4	Pamela Serena	During her school years, she received betting tips from a friend who had connections with members of the cricket team, which she used to place bets on cricket matches.	2	To avoid Lock Out.
Week 5	Sufi Motiwala	He always craved love, stability, and security. The first two times he made a male friend who made him feel safe and secure, he ended up falling in love with them and lost them both. That’s why he has such an emptiness in his heart.	2	Self-revealed after Lock Out.
Week 5	Sufi Motiwala	His biggest regret is not answering his grandmother’s phone call two days before she died. His family did not allow him to attend her funeral. Before her death, she had saved ₹50,000 for him, which he used to buy a new phone and begin his content creation journey.	1	Self-revealed after Lock Out.
Week 5	Sufi Motiwala	During his college years, while he was asleep in his PG accommodation, his roommate forced himself on him. When he ran to the PG owner for help, the PG owner later asked him to sleep with him. He ended up locking himself in the bathroom for 12 hours.	0	Self-revealed after Lock Out.
Week 5	Ram Kapoor	Helped his father plan his death after his cancer returned and his father decided not to fight it anymore. This led to his mother and sister cutting ties with him.	1	Revealed by Harshad.
Week 5	Shilpa Shinde	Under the influence of her sister-in-law, she was thrown out of her home in Mumbai by her brother on the fifth day after her shoulder surgery. She no longer has any ties with her family and now lives alone in Karjat.	2	Revealed by Shivangi.
Week 5	Pamela Serena	She was in an eight-year relationship and engaged when her fiancé underwent emergency surgery. During that time, she received a call from a woman saying that she was pregnant with his child and that they had been together for two years. She continued to take care of him until he recovered, and then ended the relationship.	1	Revealed by Apoorva.
Week 5	Harshad Chopda	Molested by an acquaintance after his parents left him under his guardianship.	0	Revealed by Varun.
Week 5	Shivangi Joshi	When her father and his business partner faced losses, they put all the blame on her father. As a result, they had to sell everything and eventually survived on just bread and butter provided by relatives. Her parents took up several odd jobs to make ends meet.	2	Revealed by Pamela.
Week 5	Shivangi Joshi	Molested by her honorary maternal uncle.	2	Self-revealed.
Week 5	Shreya Kalra	Molested by her maternal cousin.	2	Revealed by Akanksha Choudhary.
Week 5	Varun "Laila" Yadav	He secretly took up several odd jobs, such as working as a newspaper hawker, low income tourism role, giving private tuitions, after his father suffered a heart attack to help his family make ends meet.	2	Shared by Pamela.
Week 5	Ram Kapoor	He went through the worst phase of his life and suffered from depression during Bade Achhe Lagte Hain due to obesity. After attaining fame and financial success, he wasn’t ready to step away from work and focus on his health. He developed alcoholism and behaved no less than a monster on the sets, ultimately leading to the show going off air because of him. He also had suicidal thoughts but stopped himself because of his children.	0	Shield from Lock Out.
Week 5	Akanksha Choudhary	She needed ₹1–2 lakh for a pageant and approached a prominent entertainment industry personality, who had previously judged pageants, for financial help. She offered to work for his company to repay the amount. He invited her to his house, where he groped her, made sexual advances, and told her she would have to repay the money through sexual favors.	1	Self-revealed after Lock Out.

== Elimination history ==
Week	Chargesheet	Locked Out
1	Akanksha Cha. Madhuri; Shresta; Shreya; Sufi	Shresta
2	Ram; Riyaz; Shreya; Sunita; Varun	Sunita
2	Ram; Riyaz; Shreya; Sunita; Varun	Riyaz
3	Akanksha Cho. Madhuri; Yogesh	Madhuri; ~~Akanksha Cho.~~
3	Akanksha Cha. Harshad; Shivangi; Sufi; Yogesh	Yogesh
4	Harshad; Pamela; Shilpa; Sufi; Varun	Harshad
5	Harshad; Sufi	Sufi
5	Dheeraj; Yogesh	Dheeraj
5	Akanksha Cho. Pamela; Ram; Shilpa	Pamela; Akanksha Cho.
6	Shivangi	Harshad (swapped)
6	Akanksha Cha. Ram; Shilpa	Akanksha Cha.
6	Shilpa; Ram; Varun; Yogesh	Varun

== Guests ==
Week	Day	Guest	Notes
Week 1	Premiere Night	Uorfi Javed	To expose Yogesh Rawat and Akanksha Choudhary
Week 1	Premiere Night	Ashneer Grover	To introduce Madhuri Jain Grover
Week 2	Day 10	Gaurav Khanna	To meet Akanksha Chamola
Week 2	Day 11	Govinda	To 'Bail' Sunita Ahuja
Week 2	Day 11	Tina Ahuja	To 'Bail' Sunita Ahuja
Week 3	Day 12	Zayn Dheeraj Dhoopar	To meet Dheeraj Dhoopar
Week 4	Day 22	Vinny Arora Dhoopar	To meet Dheeraj Dhoopar
Week 5	Day 26	Aarush Bhola	To meet Varun "Laila" Yadav
Week 5	Day 26	Arjun Bijlani	To meet Harshad Chopda
Week 5	Day 26	Lailli Mirza	To meet Pamela Serena
Week 5	Day 26	Sorab Bedi	To meet Yogesh Rawat
Week 5	Day 26	Gautami Kapoor	To meet Ram Kapoor
Week 5	Day 26	Rishabh Jaiswal	To meet Shreya Kalra
Week 5	Day 26	Nehal Chudasama	To meet Akanksha Chamola
Week 5	Day 26	Vikas Gupta	To meet Shilpa Shinde
Week 5	Day 26	Jannat Zubair Rahmani	To meet Shivangi Joshi
Week 5	Day 26	Suzzane Ansari	To meet Akanksha Choudhary
Week 5	Day 27	Aarush Bhola	For Final; Crack Down
Week 5	Day 27	Gautami Kapoor	For Final; Crack Down
Week 5	Day 27	Lailli Mirza	For Final; Crack Down
Week 5	Day 27	Suzzane Ansari	For Final; Crack Down
Week 5	Day 27	Vikas Gupta	For Final; Crack Down
Week 5	Day 29	Prakash Chopda	Harshad’s father and Shreya’s and Shivangi’s mother; To meet Harshad, Shreya, and Shivangi, respectively.
Week 5	Day 29	Rajkumari Kalra	Harshad’s father and Shreya’s and Shivangi’s mother; To meet Harshad, Shreya, and Shivangi, respectively.
Week 5	Day 29	Yashoda Joshi	Harshad’s father and Shreya’s and Shivangi’s mother; To meet Harshad, Shreya, and Shivangi, respectively.

- ’Janta Ki Awaaz’ is a special segment featured during the weekly Judgement Day episode, in which a celebrity appears as the voice of the public, giving the inmates a reality check based on viewers’ opinions. The celebrity also has the power to ‘Secure’ an inmate who is ‘at Risk’ from being ‘Locked Out’.

Week	Day	Guest
Week 1	Day 6	Kangana Ranaut
Week 2	Day 11	Ashish Chanchlani
Week 3	Day 17	Arjun Kapoor
Week 4	Day 23	Hina Khan
Week 4	Day 23	Uorfi Javed
Week 5	Day 29	Huma Qureshi
Week 5	Day 29	Bhumi Pednekar

== Episodes ==
No. in season	Title	Original release date
Week 1
1	"Famous, Accused, Locked."	June 27, 2026
2	"Tagged and Targeted"	June 28, 2026
3	"The Jailer's Bargain"	June 29, 2026
4	"The First Chargesheet"	June 30, 2026
5	"Survive the Crackdown"	July 1, 2026
6	"Judgement Day"	July 4, 2026
Week 2
7	"Hungry for More"	July 5, 2026
8	"The Bid and The Bomb"	July 6, 2026
9	"Greed v/s Need"	July 7, 2026
10	"Love and War"	July 8, 2026
11	"The Visitor"	July 9, 2026
12	"The Storm Arrives"	July 11, 2026
Week 3
13	"Control or Chaos"	July 12, 2026
14	"The Price of Control"	July 13, 2026
15	"Powers, Secrets, Termination"	July 14, 2026
16	"Nothing stays fun"	July 15, 2026
17	"Messy Business"	July 16, 2026
18	"Shock and Terminate"	July 18, 2026
Week 4
19	"Gang Up"	July 19, 2026
20	"The Struggle Is Real"	July 20, 2026
21	"Discarded"	July 21, 2026
22	"The New Force"	July 22, 2026
23	"The Temperature Rises"	July 23, 2026
24	"Game Over"	July 25, 2026
Week 5
25	"Secrets for Sale"	July 26, 2026
26	"Truth Hits Different"	July 27, 2026
27	"The Weight of Redemption"	July 28, 2026
28	"More Than a Visit"	July 29, 2026
29	"Not Your Fight"	July 30, 2026
30	"Shaken and Stirred"	July 31, 2026
31	"Heavy Verdict"	August 1, 2026
Week 6
32	"The Feast"	August 2, 2026
33	"The Worthy and the Not"	August 3, 2026
34	"The Power of Two"	August 4, 2026
35	"Redemption Day"	August 5, 2026

== Reception ==
=== Ratings ===
The show recorded 50 million hours of watch time across the platform and generated 2.5 billion social media mentions within three weeks of its launch. The show spent two weeks on Netflix’s Global Top 10 Non-English TV series list, as Indian unscripted series grow in popularity, it is the second-most-watched title by viewing hours, according to a statement from Netflix.

=== Impact ===
It debuted with five episodes in its first week, but due to strong audience demand and its overwhelming success, the episode count was increased to six, up to finale.
