= Munawar Faruqui =

Indian stand-up comedian (born 1991)

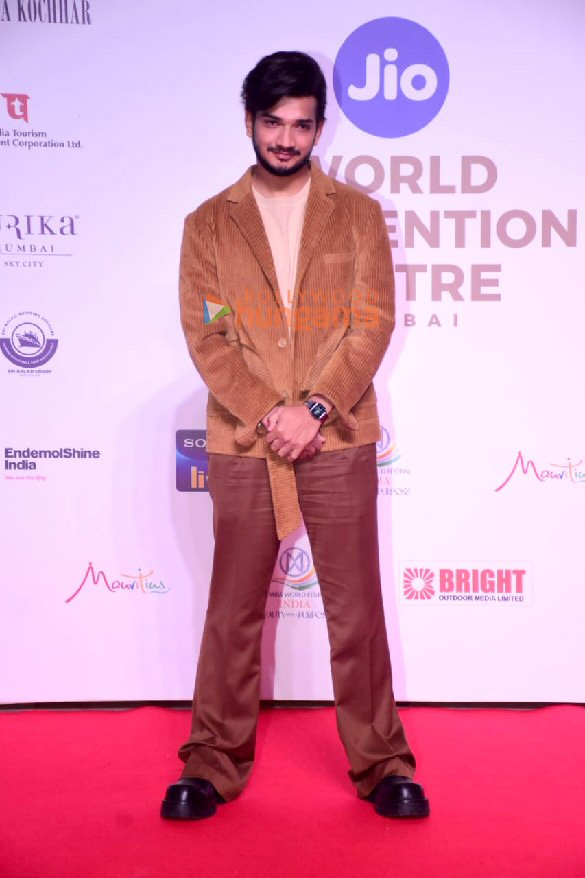
- Faruqui in 2024
- Born: Munawar Faruqui; 28 January 1991 (age 35); Junagadh, Gujarat, India
- Spouse: Jasmine (m. 2017; div. 2022) Mehzabeen Coatwala (m. 2024)

Comedy career
- Years active: 2018–present
- Medium: comedy
- Genres: Dark comedy; Satire; character comedy; Hip hop; (Rap); song writing
Munawar Faruqui
YouTube information
- Channel: Munawar Faruqui
- Genres: Comedy; Hip-hop
- Subscribers: 5.3 million
- Views: 495 million
- Last updated: 15 May 2026

Munawar Faruqui (born 28 January 1991) is an Indian comedian, rapper and singer. In 2022, he won the reality TV show Lock Upp 1. In 2023, he participated in Bigg Boss 17 and emerged as the winner.

== Early life and education ==
Faruqui was born in Junagadh, Gujarat, on 28 January 1991 into a Gujarati Muslim family. His father lost the money and came under a huge debt. Due to financial constraints, he left school after the 5th class. He started to work to make the ends meet. Still a child, he worked at a gift shop and later joined his mother and grandmother in making and selling samosas and chaklis. His mother committed suicide when he was 14 years old. After his mother's death, he relocated to Mumbai at his aunt's request. He started to do some odd jobs in Mumbai. In 2020, his father died, after being paralysed.

== Career ==
In April 2020, he uploaded a standup comedy video named "Dawood, Yamraaj & Aurat" on his YouTube channel. He released his debut song "Jawab" in collaboration with Indian musician Spectra in August 2020.

On 28 February 2021, he uploaded a standup comedy video named "Ghost Story" on his YouTube Channel.

In 2022, he became a contestant on Balaji Telefilms' reality television show Lock Upp, hosted by Kangana Ranaut. On 8 May 2022, he was declared the show's winner. The show was streamed on OTT platforms ALTBalaji and MX Player.

In 2023, he became a contestant on the reality TV show Bigg Boss 17, hosted by Salman Khan. On 28 January 2024, he was declared the show's winner. He participated in the first season of Entertainers Cricket League (ECL).

== Personal life ==
Faruqui married Jasmine in 2017, but the marriage ended in divorce in 2022. The ex-couple has a five-year-old son.

In December 2021, he started dating social media influencer Nazila Sitaishi. In Bigg Boss 17, Ayesha Khan accused him of two-timing her and Sitaishi and being involved with multiple women. Subsequently, on 18 December 2023, Sitaishi broke up with him on Instagram live, accusing him of cheating. In May 2024, he married Mehzabeen Coatwala, a makeup artist.

== Controversy ==
Munawar Faruqui was on his tour performing stand up comedy in different cities of India. On 1 January 2021, he performed a stand-up show at Munro Cafe in Indore, Madhya Pradesh, which was interrupted by Eklavya Singh Gaur, son of BJP MLA Malini Gaur accusing him of making malicious jokes about Hindu deities and the Minister of Home Affairs of India, Amit Shah. On 2 January, he was arrested by Madhya Pradesh Police in the midst of his comic act, stating that he was arrested under the Hate speech laws in India.

His arrest was criticised by some people, including a small group of global Indian diaspora on 2 February 2021, who announced that a group of South Asian Americans stand-up comedians will perform a virtual comedy show on 6 February 2021 to show their solidarity to the jailed Faruqui. He was subsequently granted bail (not acquitted) by the Supreme Court of India. He spent 37 days in jail.

On 26 March 2024, he was detained by Mumbai Police during a raid at an illegal hookah bar in Mumbai. He was later released on bail as offence was bailable.

== Filmography ==
Web series

Year	Title	Role	Notes	Ref.
2025	First Copy	Arif	Season 1 and 2	
TBA	Angadia	TBA		

=== Television ===
List of television credits
Year	Title	Role	Notes	Ref.
2019	Coldd Lassi Aur Chicken Masala	Roast Comic		
2022	Lock Upp 1	Contestant	Winner	
2023–2024	Bigg Boss 17	Contestant	Winner	
2025	Hafta Vasooli	Host		
2025	Pati Patni Aur Panga – Jodiyon Ka Reality Check	Host		
2025	The Society	Host	Season 1 and 2	
2026	India's Got Latent	Guest judge		
2026	The Traitors India 2	Contestant	20th place	

=== Special appearances ===
Year	Show	Role	Notes	Ref.
2024	Suhaagan: Ke Rang Jashn Ke Rang	Himself	Holi Celebration	
2024	Dance Deewane 4	Himself		
2024	Madness Machayenge – India Ko Hasayenge	Himself		
2024	Bigg Boss OTT Season 3	Himself	To interact with housemates and conduct a task.	
2024	Star Vs Food Survival	Himself	Munawar joins chef Ranveer Brar in the new episode of Star vs Food Survival Season 2	

=== Music videos ===
List of music video credits
Year	Title	Singer(s)	Notes	Ref.
2021	‘’Dus Lakh’’	Munawar Faruqui	Directed by Shubham Dolas	
2022	"Halki Si Barsaat"	Saaj Bhatt	Featuring; Nazila Sitaishi	
2022	"Ik Tu Hi"	Rito Riba	Featuring; Oviya Darnal	
2024	"Halki Halki Si"	Asees Kaur, Saaj Bhatt	Featuring; Hina Khan	
2025	"Hawa Banke"	Rito Riba	Featuring; Kinza Hashmi	

== Discography ==
Year	Track	Co-artist	Notes	Ref.
2020	"Jawab"	Spectra		
2020	"Nagpada Ka Rider"	Spectra		
2021	"Aazmaish"	Nazz		
2021	"Dus Lakh"	Spectra		
2021	"Hunarat"			
2021	"Khawab"	DRJ Sohail		
2022	"Kalandar"	Farhan Khan		
2022	"Khamoshi"	Farhan Khan		
2022	"Todh"	Prince Narula		
2022	"Kaamil"			
2023	"Alag BT"	Hitzone	From his debut album Madari	
2023	"Noor"		From his debut album Madari	
2023	"Madari"	Farhan Khan, Charan	From his debut album Madari	
2023	"Mumtaz"		From his debut album Madari	
2023	"Kajal"		From his debut album Madari	
2023	"Tu Lage Mujhe"		From his debut album Madari	
2023	"KOD"		From his debut album Madari	
2023	"Malaal"	ft. Rashmeet Kaur	From his debut album Madari	
2023	"Legacy"	Ganesh Acharya		
2023	"Maula"	Kshmr	From KSHMR's sophomore album, Karam	
2023	"Pyar ki Bahaar"	ft. Rashmeet Kaur		
2024	"Dhandho"	Spectra		
2024	"Kuch Yaadein"	Suyyash Rai		
2024	"Dark Circles"	DRJ Sohail		
2024	"SuppaMario"	Aniket		
2024	"Wolf"	Raga		
