= Payal Rohatgi =

Indian actress (born 1983)

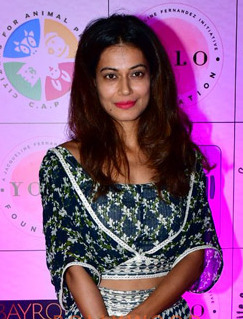
- Rohatgi in 2023
- Born: 9 November 1983 (age 42); Hyderabad, Andhra Pradesh (present-day Telangana), India
- Occupations: Actress, model
- Years active: 2002–2022
- Title: Supermodel Miss Tourism World 2001; Miss India Tourism 2001
- Spouse: Sangram Singh (m. 2022)

Payal Rohatgi (born 9 November 1983) is an Indian actress and reality TV performer who appears in Hindi films. She was a contestant in the reality show Bigg Boss in 2008. In 2022, she participated in ALT Balaji's reality television show Lock Upp and emerged as the runner-up.

== Early life ==
Payal was born on 9 November 1983 in Hyderabad and earned a degree in computer engineering and was also a Gujarat Board Topper.

== Career ==
Rohatgi started her career by being part of the Femina Miss India pageant. She later went on to represent India as Miss India Tourism in Miss Tourism World pageant internationally. There Rohatgi won the title of Supermodel Miss Tourism World.

Rohatgi modeled for various brands, including Amul, Nirma, Nescafe, and Dabur Hair Oil. She gained attention after appearing in a television ad for Cadbury's Temptations Chocolates. Around this time she also appeared in music videos by rock band Silk Route and Indipop artist KK.

In 2002, she did her debut with Yeh Kya Ho Raha Hai?, and in 2006, she appeared in 36 China Town. In the same year, she was offered an item song in the Madhur Bhandarkar film Corporate. She made a cameo appearance in Ugly Aur Pagli, which was released in August 2008. In mid-September, she appeared opposite Irrfan Khan in Dil Kabaddi. Rohatgi was considered a sex symbol by the Indian media during her early career in films.

Payal Rohatgi made her theatre debut with director and producer Vandana Sajnani's play called Fourplay in 2010.

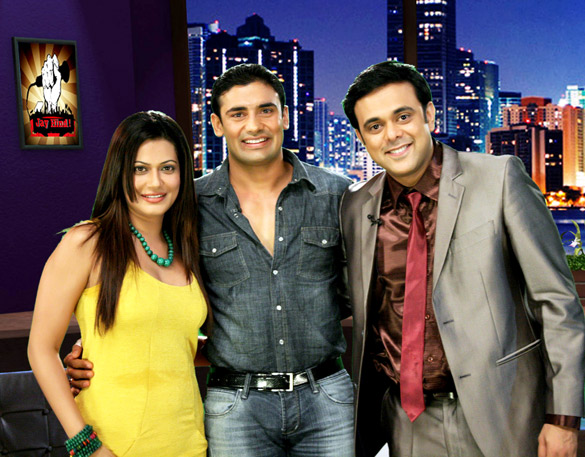
Payal Rohatgi and Sangram Singh with Sumeet Raghavan on the sets of Jay Hind! show

In September 2013, Rohatgi was featured in Life OK's TV fiction show Hum Ne Li Hai Shapath where she played the supervillain Gong in a special episode of the comic series. In 2014, Rohatgi was part of the national anthem shot by director Rajeev Walia. In September 2014, Rohatgi made her television debut on the Sony TV show Humsafars. In April 2015, Rohatgi with her fiancé wrestler Sangram Singh were seen in the dance reality show Nach Baliye 7, on Star Plus. They lasted in the show till the seventh final episode. Both of them also did a film together, called Night. In February 2022, she made a comeback to entertainment industry as she participated in the OTT reality show Lock Upp.

== Personal life ==
Rohatgi started dating wrestler Sangram Singh in 2011, whom she met on the sets of reality show Survivor India. On 27 February 2014, she got engaged to wrestler Sangram Singh in Ahmedabad. They both got married in August 2022.

They were the brand ambassadors of International Human Rights Organisation (IHRO), an Indian NGO from New Delhi,

== Controversies ==
Rohatgi shared fake news and fringe theories multiple times from Twitter account. She was locked from Twitter for a week for "communalising" 2019 Hyderabad gang rape. Twitter handle of Mumbai police blocked Rohatgi in 2019 but later unblocked her when Chief Minister's wife, Amruta Fadnavis, voiced support for her.

During 2018 Kerala floods, Payal Rohatgi claimed that it was wrath of God due to cow slaughter. Her remarks were called as "insensitive" and she was trolled on Twitter due to her remarks.

In July 2019, she also commented on inequality in Islam in Instagram over Zaira Wasim's decision to leave Bollywood. Police complaint against her was lodged at Oshiwara police station in August 2019 over her remarks.

Rohatgi also attacked the 19th century Indian social reformer Raja Ram Mohan Roy as a "traitor" & lackey of British, and accused him of defaming the tradition of Sati. She also glorified the tradition of Sati, saying that women burned themselves alive in order to evade rape by Islamic invaders. Hindol Sengupta and Sanjeev Sanyal presented balanced view of the events over her remarks. Museum Secretary of Raja Ram Mohan Roy Memorial Museum said that Rohatgi seems to know nothing about him.

In June 2019, Rohatgi claimed that maratha ruler Shivaji was born in shudra varna and later moved up in caste hierarchy. NCP leader Jitendra Awhad filed complaint against her in Mumbai and demanded arrest of her over her remarks. She issued a video apology over Twitter.

Rohatgi claimed that Jawaharlal Nehru, first prime minister of India, was not legitimate child of Motilal Nehru but born out of an illicit relationship of Kamala Nehru with another man in Facebook video in October 2019. She also alleged that Motilal Nehru had five wives. Youth Congress leader lodged police complaint against her for insulting the Nehru family. Later, she offered public apology to Priyanka Gandhi and Sonia Gandhi. On 15 December, she was detained by Bundi Police in Ahmedabad due to her remarks on Nehru-Gandhi family. She was later arrested. On 16 December 2019 Court sent her in Judicial custody for 9 days till 24 December 2019. On 17 December she was released on bail.

Rohatgi wrote a series of vulgar tweets about Muslim women participating in Citizenship (Amendment) Bill protests for which Twitter suspended her account for a week in June 2020. Her account was permanently suspended in July 2020. A Metropolitan Magistrate court in Mumbai noted that the tweets prima facie "show disregard against Muslim women and Community" and ordered a technical investigation.

== Filmography ==
=== Films ===
Year	Title	Role	Language	Notes
1991	Keechu Raallu	child artist	Telugu film	
2002	Yeh Kya Ho Raha Hai?	Esha	Hindi debut film	
2002	Patth		Hindi	
2003	Tumse Milkar	Flora	Hindi	
2004	Plan	Tanya	Hindi	
2004	Police Force: An Inside Story	Item Song	Hindi	
2004	Rakht	Tanya	Hindi	
2004	Tauba Tauba	Payal	Hindi	
2005	Laila – A Mystery	Laila	Hindi	
2005	Chetna: The Excitement	Chetna	Hindi	
2005	Fun - Can Be Dangerous Sometimes	Natasha	Hindi	
2006	36 China Town	Gracy	Hindi	
2006	Mr. 100%		Hindi	
2006	Corporate	Item Song	Hindi	
2007	Heyy Babyy	Special appearance	Hindi	
2007	Mahanandi	Item Song	Telugu	
2007	Dhol	Sophie	Hindi	
2008	Ugly Aur Pagli	Guest appearance	Hindi	
2008	Dil Kabaddi	Kaya	Hindi	
2012	Valentine's Night	Sanjana	Hindi	
2018	Halfa Macha Ke Gail	Item Song	Bhojpuri	

=== Television ===
Year	Title	Role	Notes	Ref.
2007	Fear Factor India 2	Contestant	4th Place	
2008	Fear Factor: Khatron Ke Khiladi 1	Contestant	Eliminated, 13th place	
2008	Bigg Boss 2	Contestant	9th place (Evicted on Day 54)	
2009	Raaz Pichhle Janam Ka	Contestant		
2010	Meethi Choori No 1	Contestant		
2010	CID	Herself		
2011	Zor Ka Jhatka: Total Wipeout 1	Contestant		
2012	Survivor India 1	Contestant	6th place(Semifinalist)	
2013	Hum Ne Li Hai-Shapath	Payal		
2013	Welcome – Baazi Mehmaan Nawazi Ki 1	Contestant	Winner	
2013	Bigg Boss 7	Herself	Guest	
2014	Box Cricket League 1	Contestant		
2014–2015	Humsafars	Anam		
2015	Nach Baliye 7	Contestant	9th place	
2015	2025 Jaane Kya Hoga Aage	Forum	Special appearance	
2015	Agent Raghav - Crime Branch	Manjeera	Special appearance	
2016	Suryaputra Karn	Amba / Shikhandini / Shikhandi		
2022	Lock Upp	Contestant	1st Runner-up	
