= Sangram Singh =

Indian professional wrestler (born 1985)

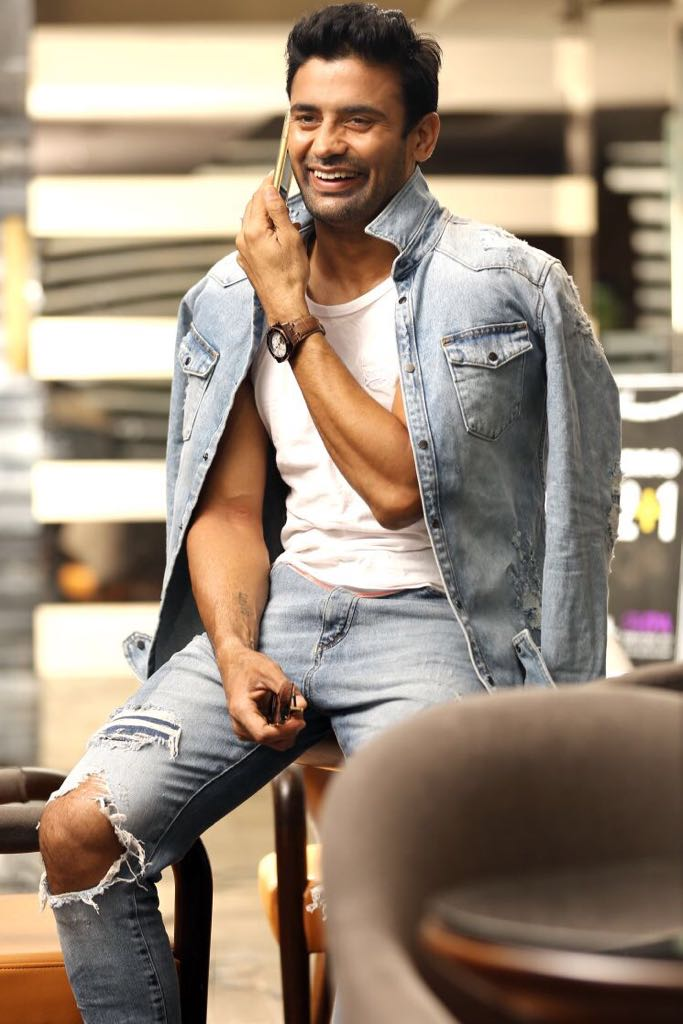
- Singh in 2019
- Born: 21 July 1985 (age 41); Rohtak, Haryana, India
- Occupations: Wrestler, actor, motivational speaker
- Spouse: Payal Rohatgi (m. 2022)

Sangram Singh (born 21 July 1985) is an Indian wrestler, actor, motivational speaker and MMA Fighter.

== Early life ==
Sangram was born in the village of Madina, located in Rohtak, Haryana. He was diagnosed with rheumatoid arthritis and used a wheelchair for the first eight years of his life. His father, Umed Singh, is a retired Army soldier, while his mother, Ramodevi, is a homemaker.

== Career ==
=== Professional wrestling career ===
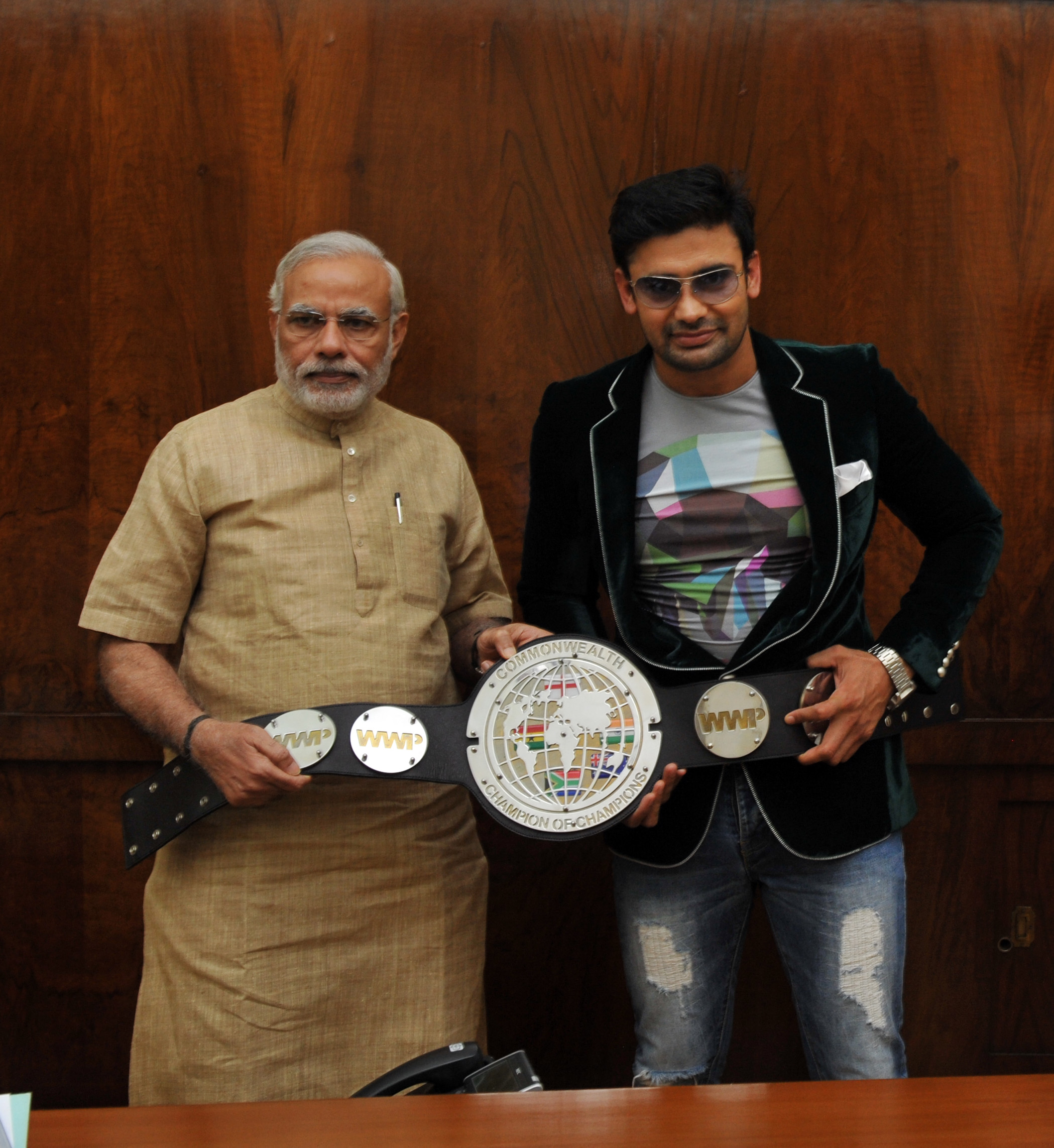
Wrestler Sangram Singh meets Prime Minister Narendra Modi.

Sangram Singh started his career as a sportsperson with the Delhi Police in 1999. In All India Police Games 2005 he represented Delhi Police at Chawla (New Delhi) and won a bronze medal. He was awarded the title World's Best Professional Wrestler by World Wrestling Professionals (WWP), after a match in South Africa in 2012 for his style, stamina, and nature of wrestling.

In July 2015, Sangram won the WWP Commonwealth Heavyweight Championship after defeating Joe E. Legend in the Last Man Standing fight in Port Elizabeth. Prime Minister Shri Narendra Modi called Sangram Singh at the Parliament house to congratulate him for his victory.

Sangram won the WWP Commonwealth Heavyweight Championship for the second time on 27 March 2016, by defeating South African wrestler Ananzi, keeping the belt in India. The match was held at Port Elizabeth, South Africa.

After a six-year hiatus, Singh returned to professional wrestling at the Dubai Pro International Wrestling Championship on 24 February 2024, where he defeated Pakistan’s Mohammad Saeed and won his match.

=== Mixed martial arts career ===
In October 2024, Singh made his mixed martial arts (MMA) debut at the Gama International Fighting Championship in Tbilisi, Georgia, defeating Pakistan’s Ali Raza Nasir in 90 seconds. The bout was widely reported in Indian media as a significant milestone, with Singh becoming the first Indian male wrestler to successfully transition into MMA and win a professional bout.

At the age of 40, Singh’s entry into MMA was noted by media outlets as an uncommon achievement for an athlete beginning a professional mixed martial arts career at that stage of life.

In November 2025, Singh competed in the Levels Fight League in Amsterdam, Netherlands, where he defeated Tunisian fighter Hakim Trabelsi in his bout. This was his second professional MMA fight, and with this victory he became the first Indian athlete to compete in the promotion and also secure a win in this league.

In April 2026, Singh competed in an MMA bout in Buenos Aires, Argentina, where he defeated French fighter Florian Coudier in 1 minute and 45 seconds. With this victory, he became the first Indian athlete to win a mixed martial arts bout in Argentina, and recorded his third consecutive win in MMA competitions.

Following his victory in Argentina in April 2026, Singh was praised by Union Sports Minister Mansukh Mandaviya for promoting yoga and pranayama internationally. The Sports Ministry also expressed support for his involvement in initiatives aimed at promoting fitness and motivating youth participation in sports across India.

In July 2026, Singh competed in the Strike Asia Championship held in Kuala Lumpur, Malaysia, where he defeated Pakistan's Mohammad Abid Ali by knockout in 80 seconds to win the title. With the victory, media reports described him as the first Indian to win the Strike Asia Championship title.

=== Social service and motivational speaking ===
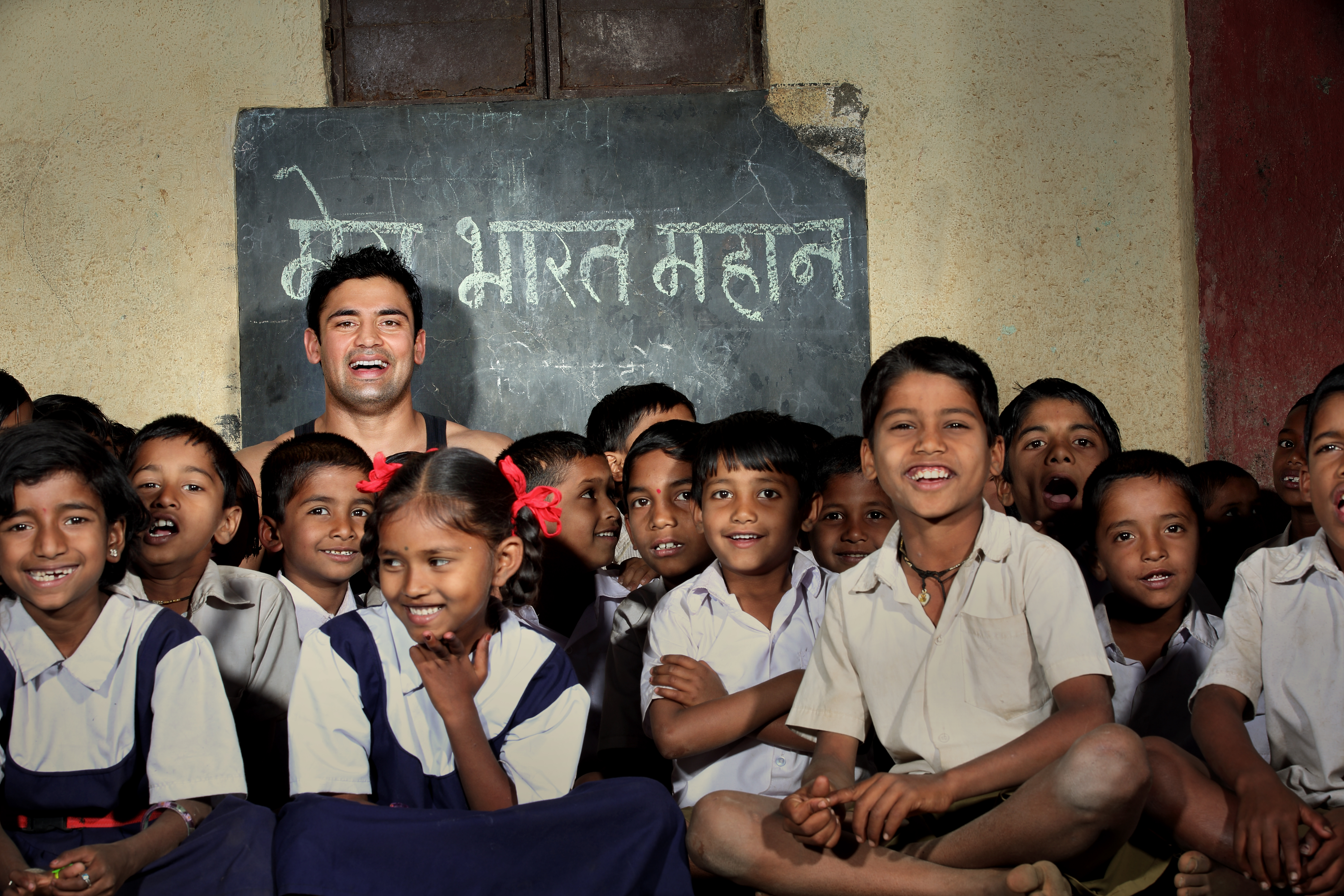
Wrestler Sangram Singh adopted several children from all over India to educate them and to provide them a bright future.

Sangram has been involved in social service and conducts various motivational talks for corporate companies. He motivates youngsters at schools and colleges by sharing his life journey. He was a motivational speaker for Indian wrestlers who were representing India in the Commonwealth Games. Sangram has also been part of promotion to create awareness about voting in Haryana, his hometown. Singh announced the launch of the Champions Pro Khusti league in December 2015 in Mumbai. Sangram played his first international match in India in Chandigarh on 6 February 2016, the proceeds of which were dedicated to the benefit of cancer patients. Recently, Sangram Singh adopted 16 girls and 7 boys from his hometown Haryana and has sponsored their education. This is along with the adoption of a school in Satara, Maharashtra. Sangram Singh Foundation organised the first wrestling awards to felicitate and honour the forgotten heroes from wrestling who had won individual medals for India over the years on 16 September 2017 in New Delhi.

=== Entertainment ===
In 2018 Director Mahesh Bhatt presented his first music video with Sangram Singh. Sangram shared his fitness mantra with actress Raveena Tandon on her television chat show Simply Baatein. Sangram also featured in Hrithik Roshan and Discovery India's television show HRX Heroes depicting stories of real-life heroes. Sangram's journey from the wheelchair to being an international professional wrestler was portrayed in this show. DD Sports telecasted a panel discussion series titled Rio to Tokyo: Vision 2020 to encourage participation of female athletes in various fields of sports. A special show as part of the series was hosted by Sangram Singh at Haryana's MD University Rohtak on 19 December 2016. Sangram has walked the ramp for designers like Sanjana Jon, Nitya Bajaj Birla, Dhruv Vaish in the Fashion Design Council of India.

=== Sportswear line ===
Sangram launched his sportswear range SGXbySangramSingh in Delhi on 17 March 2016 at the Fashion Design Council of India. This launch was supported by celebrity designer Rohit Bal (the council's president), Sunil Sethi and Sangram's fiancée, actress Payal Rohatgi.

=== Awards and recognition ===
Sangram received the Man of Substance award on India Men Show which took place on 18 April 2019, at the Metropolitan Hotel, New Delhi. He is also the world peace brand ambassador of Wockhardt Group. He received the title Indian Affairs Indian of the year 2014 in Sports Leadership at the 5th Annual Indian Affairs, founded by Satya Brahma, at India Leadership Conclave & Indian Affairs Business Leadership Awards 2014. He gave a motivational talk to the students of IIT Delhi in February 2016 when he was invited to the institution as a guest of honour. Recently, a chapter on Sangram's life journey has been included in Hindi textbooks for children studying in the 7th standard. A scholarship in a university under Sangram Singh has been offered to students who come from modest families. Sangram was also appointed the brand ambassador for Haryana Kabaddi League, that was organised in Haryana in June 2016. Sangram was invited by the AYUSH ministry and the NDMC to Delhi as guest of honour to motivate youngsters on International Yoga Day 2016, by sharing his life story and talking about the benefits of yoga.

== Personal life ==
Sangram Singh hails from Rohtak, Haryana. He has a brother and a sister. Born in the village of Madina, Sangram fought rheumatoid arthritis and got up from the wheelchair to become a wrestler representing India. He also had a brief stint in Delhi Police. Sangram and actress Payal Rohatgi got engaged on 27 February 2014 at a ceremony in Payal's hometown Ahmedabad.

Singh started a fitness campaign to motivate people He has donated towards PM's relief fund and also working with an NGO.

Singh married actress Payal Rohatgi in a traditional Hindu wedding ceremony on 9 July 2022 in Agra, Uttar Pradesh.

== Filmography ==
=== Films ===
Year	Title	Director	Note	Ref.
2015	Uvaa	Jasvir Bhati		
2021	God of Cricket	Sudesh Kanojia		
2024	Udaan	Deepak		
2026	Khashaba	Nagraj Manjule		

=== Television ===
Year	Name	Role	Notes
2012	Survivor India	Contestant	Jury
2013	Welcome – Baazi Mehmaan Nawazi Ki	Contestant	Winner
2013	Bigg Boss 7	Contestant	Finalist
2014	SuperCops vs Supervillains	Contestant	Inspector Sangram
2015	Nach Baliye 7	Along with Payal Rohatgi	
2022	Lock Upp (season 1)		Guest
	Senior World Wrestling Championship	Host and Commentator	
	Be A Champion with Sangram Singh	Host and Narrator	
	Jeetunga Main	Host and Himself	
	Hausalon Ki Udaan	Host	
	100% De Dana Dan	Himself	
	Sacch Ka Saamna	Himself	
	Big Toss	Himself	
	Badi Door Se Aaye Hai	Armaan Kumar	
	Tau aur Bhau	Host	
	Simply Baatien with Raveena	Himself	
	HRX heroes	Himself	
	IRT India	Himself	
	Rio to Tokyo: Vision 2020	Host	

== Wrestling ==
Year	competition	Location	Category	Place/medal
2003	49th Senior Men Greco Roman Style National Wrestling Championship	Ranchi	120 kg	Second / Silver
2005	World Senior Wrestling Championship	Budapest (Hungary)	96 kg	Participated
2005	All India Police Games, Represent Delhi Police	Chawla (New Delhi)	96 kg	Bronze Medal
2006	Johnie Reitz Big-5 Wrestling Competition (Open Championship)	Johannesburg (South Africa)	96 kg	Gold medal
2007	All India Open Wrestling Competition	Delhi	110 kg	Gold / First
2015	WWP Commonwealth Heavyweight Championships	Port Elizabeth, South Africa	last man standing	Winner
2016	Champions ProKhusti	Mohali, Chandigarh, India	defeat Robbie E	Winner
2016	WWP Commonwealth Heavyweight Championships	Port Elizabeth, South Africa	defeat Ananzi	Winner
2017	KD Jadhav Memorial International Khusti Championships	Talkatora Stadium, New Delhi	defeat Kevin Radford Jr	Winner
2024	Dubai Pro International wrestling championship organised by WPWH- World professional wrestling hub	Dubai Alhail	defeat Mohammad Saeed	Winner
2024	Gama International Fighting Championship	Tbilisi, Georgia	defeat Ali Raza Nasir	Winner
2025	Levels Fight League	Amsterdam, Netherlands	defeated Hakim Trabelsi	Winner
2026	Samurai Fight House	Buenos Aires, Argentina	defeated Florian Coudier	Winner
2026	Strike Asia Championship	Kuala Lumpur, Malaysia	defeated Mohammad Abid Ali	Winner

== Awards ==
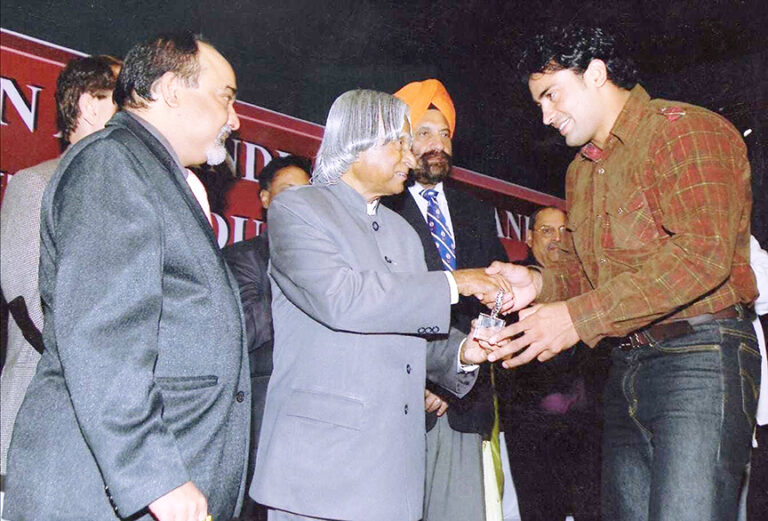
Sangram Singh meets former President Dr. Abdul Kalam.

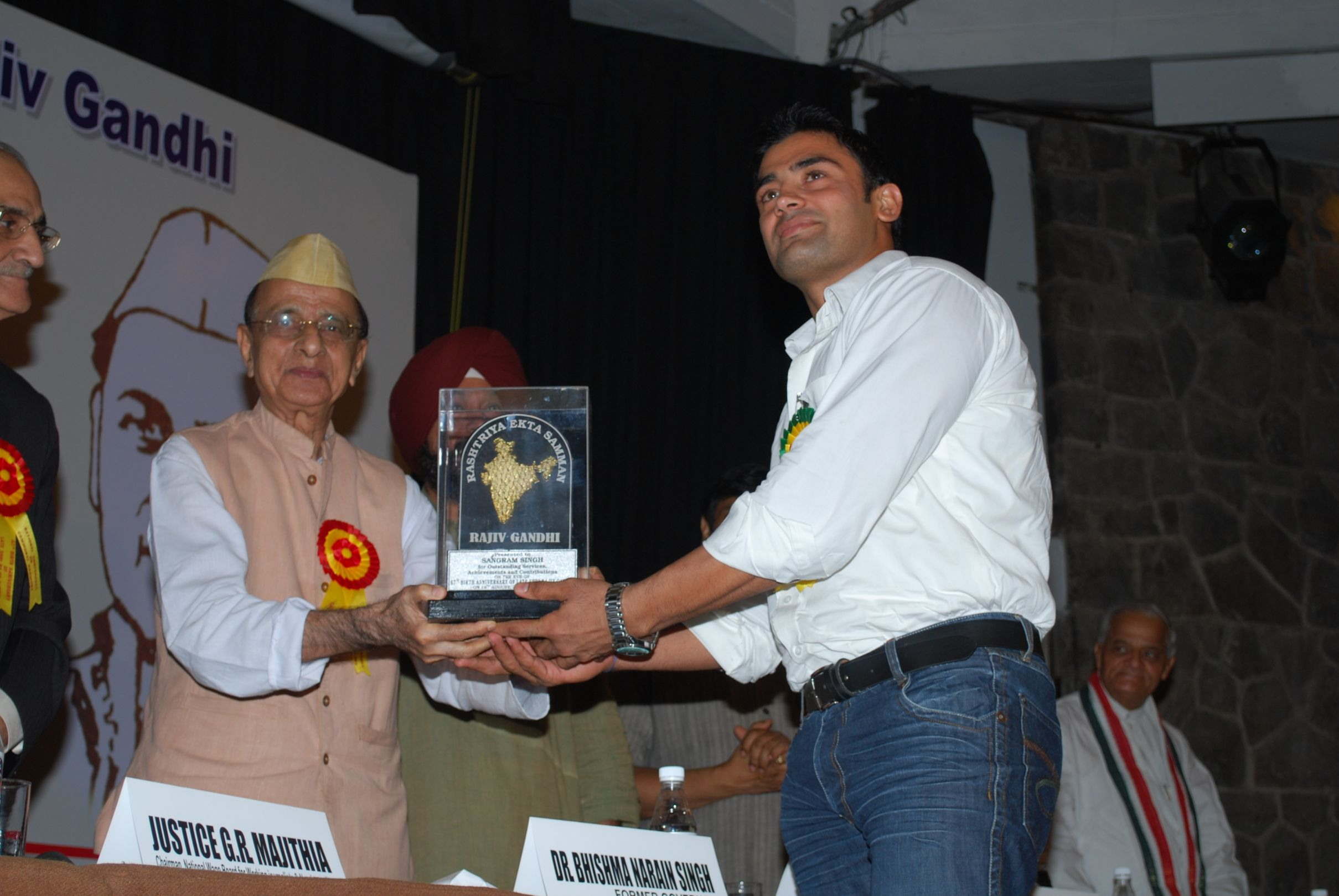
Rajiv Gandhi Rashtriya Ekta Samman 2010

Year	Award	Award by	About the award
2010	Crown Award	Young Men's Association of India	Young Men's Association of India is an NGO headed by president Amit Swami who is a promoter of bodybuilding in India. The honour is presented for Sangram's achievements in wrestling.
2010	Rajiv Gandhi Rashtriya Ekta Samman	All India national Unity conference (AINUC)	Sangram Singh Presented for Achievements in various areas of life.
2012	Shiv Rajmudra Chhatrapati Award	Indian Martial Art - Maharashtra	Sangram Singh was awarded this award as Best Sports Person of 2012.
2012	World's Best Wrestler of 2012	WWP	WWP is a Professional Wrestling Federation in South Africa. Sangram was selected for this award from World Wide Wrestlers in WWP.
2014	Indian Affair India Leadership Conclave Award	Prestige Media Outfit	Sangram Singh among others shined at Asia's Biggest India Leadership Conclave Awards 2014
2014	Top 30 under 30	Hindustan Times	Sangram Singh received this award as being young and inspiring youth who brought a good change in society and is notable in his respected field.
2015	National Achievements Awards	Newspapers association of India (NAI)	Best Sportsperson of the year.
2016	Best Sportsperson & TV personality	Dr. A.P.J Abdul Kalam Award	This award was initiated by the nephew of the former President of India and an acclaimed NGO.
2018	Bharat Gaurav Award	The Bharat Gaurav award Foundation.	Sangram Singh was felicitated with Bharat Gaurav Award for being a talented sports contributor to the Nation.
2019	Fighters Spirit of the Year 2019	Med Scape India	Medscape India National Awards has been a successful endeavor of Medscape India since the last eight years. Sangram Singh has awarded for his contribution in the field of health care of India
2019	Man of Substance award	Born Of Web	Sangram Singh receives Iconic Man of Substance Award for his dedication towards fitness and a healthy Lifestyle.
2019	World Peace of Messengers	World Peace and Diplomacy Organisation	Sangram Singh receives this award for contributing his share towards the betterment of people globally.
2020	Change Maker Award 2020	Award by Yuva Unstoppable	Sangram Singh was recognised as Changemaker at Yuva Unstoppable event in Delhi for the remarkable mission and work of Sangram Singh Foundation.
2020	Dream Achiever award	Films Today, Nana Nani Foundation	Sangram Singh receives Dream Achievers Award for his unparalleled contribution towards society and was honoured by Governor of Maharashtra
2021	Maharashtra Jan Gaurav Purskar	Shri Bhagatsingh Koshyariji Governor of Maharashtra	Sangram Singh was awarded for Maharashtra Jan Gaurav Purskar Ceremony at Raj Bhavan by the hand Shri Bhagatsingh koshyariji governor of Maharashtra.
2022	Youth Icon Award	Cinema Aaj Tak	Sangram Singh was awarded Youth Icon Award by Cinema Aaj Tak -2022
2022	Perfect Achiever award	Perfect Woman Magazine	On mens Day Sangram Singh receives Perfect Achievers Award for being the Best Real Life Power Couple of the Year 1
2023	Times Leading Icons Award	Times of India	In category Sports & Fitness at Mumbai
2024	Maharashtra Gaurav Award	Mid-Day	In category of Sports at the 3rd Mid-Day Maharashtra Gaurav Awards ceremony
2025	Crafting Bharat Award	Crafting Bharat Initiative	Honoured with the title "Fearless Victory Icon" for achievements in sports and public life
