= Lock Upp =

Indian reality television series

- Genre: Reality
- Created by: Ekta Kapoor
- Presented by: Kangana Ranaut (season 1); Karan Kundrra (jailor, season 1); Farah Khan (season 2); Riteish Deshmukh (season 2)
- Country of origin: India
- Original language: Hindi
- No. of seasons: 2

Production
- Production locations: Mumbai, Maharashtra, India
- Production company: Balaji Telefilms

Original release
- Network: ALTBalaji; MX Player (season 1); Netflix (season 2)
- Release: 27 February 2022 – present

Lock Upp is an Indian reality series created by Ekta Kapoor. The series follows contestants, known as inmates, who live in a jail-themed setting and compete in tasks while facing eliminations.

The first season, titled Lock Upp: Badass Jail, Atyaachari Khel!, hosted by Kangana Ranaut, premiered on ALTBalaji and MX Player on 27 February 2022.

The second season, titled Lock Upp: Sach Ya Sazaa, hosted by Farah Khan and Riteish Deshmukh, premiered on Netflix on 27 June 2026.

The third season, titled Lock Upp - Season 2, hosted by Farah Khan and Riteish Deshmukh is scheduled to be premiered on Netflix on late December 2026.

== Overview ==
Ekta Kapoor teased the show for its inaugural season on her social media handles and described it as one of the biggest and most fearless reality shows for ALTBalaji and MX Player.

== Format ==
Contestants, referred to as "inmates", are placed inside a jail-themed set where they compete to earn basic necessities, perform tasks, reveal personal truths, and win the heart of the host(s) and audience by showcasing their personalities. In the end, the contestant with the highest number of votes walks away with freedom and the trophy.

== Series overview ==
Series	Host	Episodes	Originally released			Days	Inmates	Prize money	Winner	Runner-up
Series	Host	Episodes	First released	Last released	Network	Days	Inmates	Prize money	Winner	Runner-up
1	Kangana Ranaut; Karan Kundrra	71	27 February 2022	7 May 2022	ALTBalaji; MX Player	70	20	₹20 lakh (US$21,000)	Munawar Faruqui	Payal Rohatgi
2	Farah Khan; Riteish Deshmukh	35	27 June 2026	5 August 2026	Netflix	33	17	₹1 crore (US$110,000)	Shreya Kalra	Shivangi Joshi
3	Farah Khan; Riteish Deshmukh	TBA	2026	TBA	Netflix	TBA	TBA	TBA	TBA	TBA

== Seasons ==
=== Season 1 ===
The first season, titled Lock Upp: Badass Jail, Atyaachari Khel!, premiered on ALTBalaji and MX Player on 27 February 2022. Hosted by Kangana Ranaut, the season concluded on 7 May 2022, with Munawar Faruqui winning the inaugural season and Payal Rohatgi finishing second.

=== Season 2 ===
The second season, titled Lock Upp: Sach Ya Sazaa, premiered on Netflix on 27 June 2026. Hosted by Farah Khan and Riteish Deshmukh, the season concluded on 5 August 2026, with Shreya Kalra winning the season and Shivangi Joshi finishing second.

== See also ==
- List of programs broadcast by ALTBalaji
