= Britain's Got Talent: The Champions series 1 =

Britain's Got Talent: The Champions
- Series 1
- Hosted by: Anthony McPartlin; Declan Donnelly; Stephen Mulhern
- Judges: Simon Cowell; Amanda Holden; Alesha Dixon; David Walliams
- Winner: Twist & Pulse
- Runner-up: Stavros Flatley
- No. of episodes: 6

Release
- Original network: ITV
- Original release: 31 August – 5 October 2019

The first series of the spin-off, Britain's Got Talent: The Champions began airing on 31 August, 2019, on ITV. The programme features a selection of participants - winners, finalists and other notable acts - from across the history of both Britain's Got Talent and the Got Talent franchise.

The judging panel consisted of Simon Cowell, Amanda Holden, Alesha Dixon, and David Walliams, while Anthony McPartlin and Declan Donnelly (colloquially known as Ant & Dec) served as the main hosts, all of whom judged and hosted the previous series of the main series.

The spin-off is based upon America's Got Talent: The Champions, in that the format is different to the main programme - episodes are pre-recorded, and votes for participants are conducted under a different system. The spin-off series averaged 5.84 million viewers across the 6 episodes during its broadcast.

Comedic dance duo Twist & Pulse were announced the winner becoming the first duo dance act to win the show as a whole. Stavros Flatley finished as runner-up and Kseniya Simonova finished in third place, with all three being awarded the Golden Buzzer in the Preliminaries.

== Overview ==
Judges and presenter(s) for Britain's Got Talent: The Champions (2019)

Simon Cowell

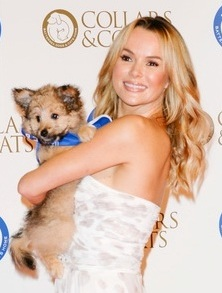
Amanda Holden

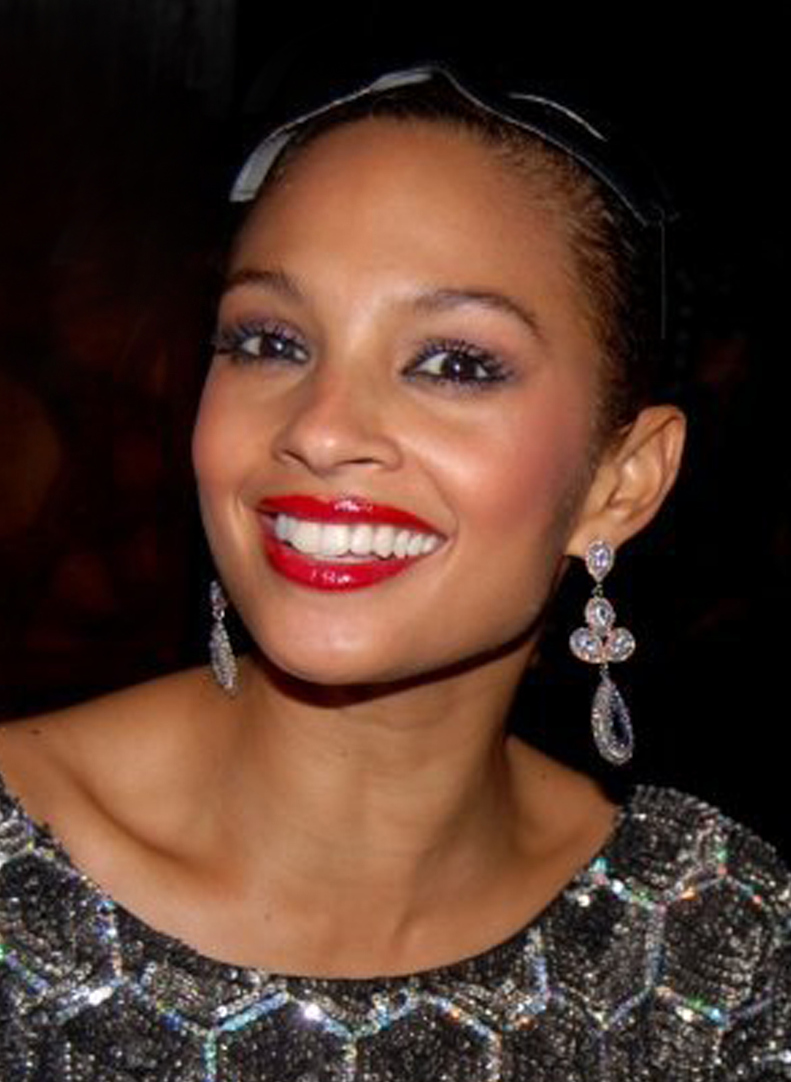
Alesha Dixon

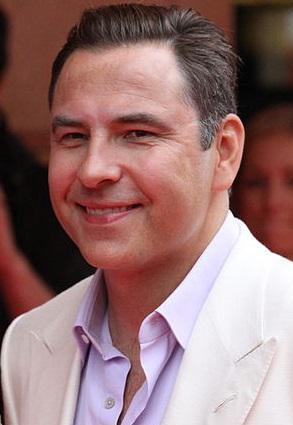
David Walliams

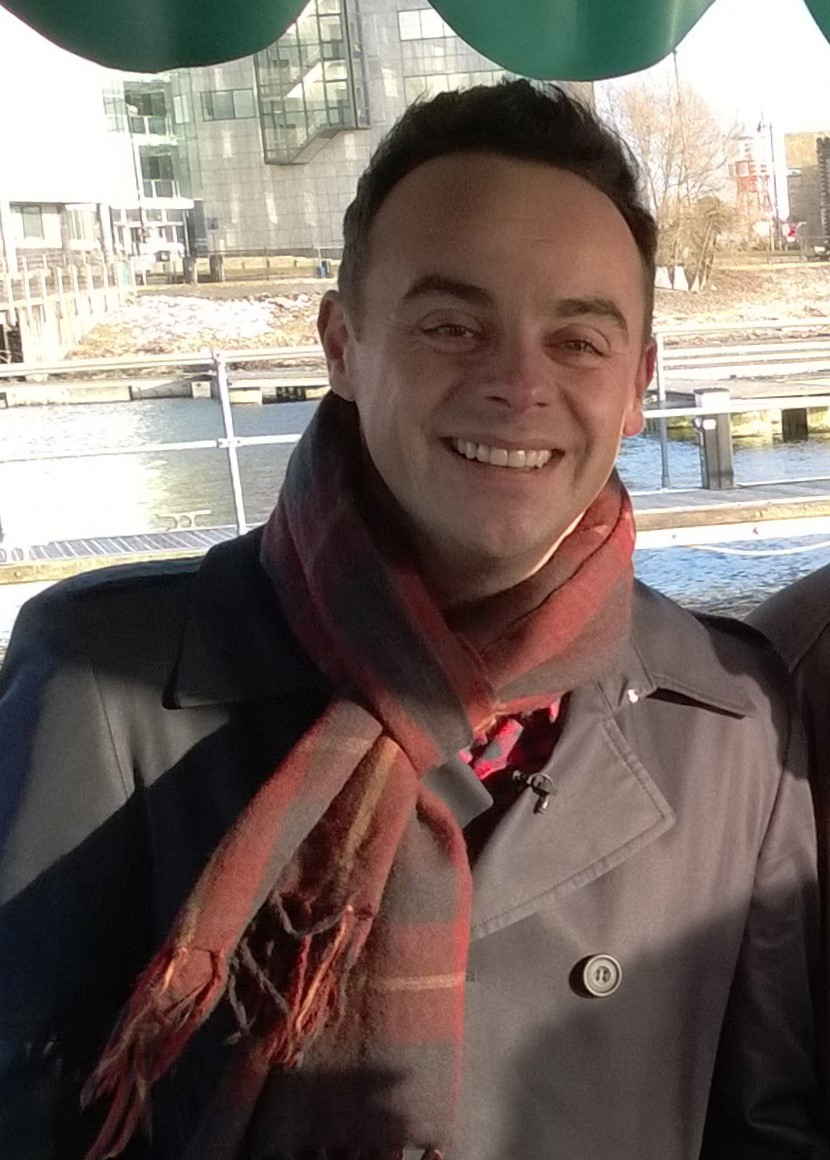
Ant McPartlin

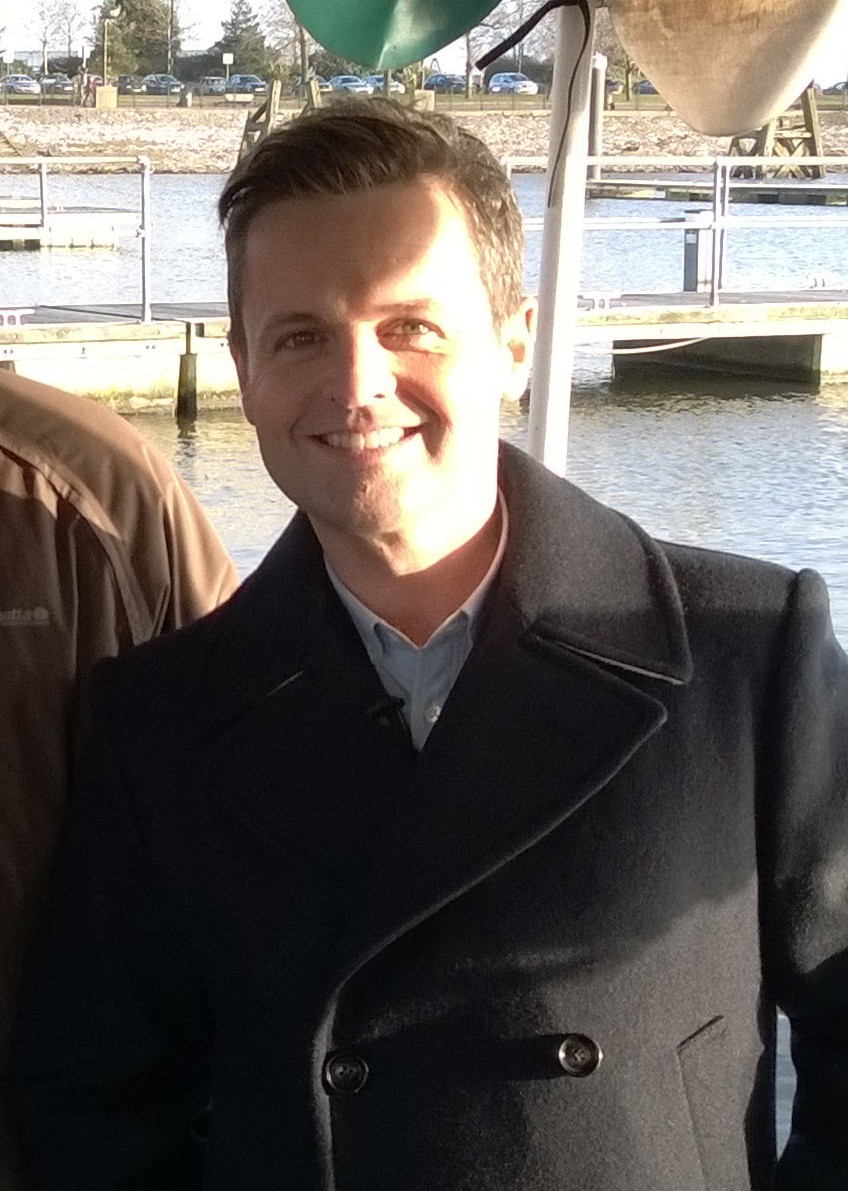
Declan Donnelly

Around 45 participants from across the Got Talent franchise, ranging from winners, live round participants – both quarter-finalists (where applicable) and semi-finalists – and other notable acts, participated during The Champions contest in 2019, with each of the contest's preliminaries featuring nine participants and with 10 of these securing a place within the finals.

The following table lists each participants that took part, their history in the Got Talent franchise – per respective international version, series, and performance – and their overall result in the contest:

Got Talent History Key	AGT – America's Got Talent	AGTC – America's Got Talent: The Champions	ArGT - Arab's Got Talent	AsGT – Asia's Got Talent
Got Talent History Key	AuGT – Australia's Got Talent	BGT – Britain's Got Talent	BeGT – Belgium's Got Talent	ČSMT – Česko Slovensko má talent
Got Talent History Key	DS – Das Supertalent	FIT – La France a un incroyable talent	GGT - Georgia's Got Talent!	GTE – Got Talent España
Got Talent History Key	HGT – Holland's Got Talent	IGT – Italia's Got Talent	InGT – India's Got Talent	MS – Minuta slavy
Got Talent History Key	PGT – Pilipinas Got Talent	SAGT — South Africa's Got Talent	UMT – Ukrayina maye talant	

Winner | Runner-up | Third place
Finalist | Eliminated | Golden Buzzer

Participant	Act	Got Talent history	Preliminary	Results
100 Voices of Gospel	Gospel Choir	BGT: 10 - Finalist	2	Eliminated
Alex Magala	Sword Swallower	AGT: S8 - Quarter-finalist; IGT: S5 - Finalist; MS: S8 - Winner; UMT: S6 - Semi-finalist; FIT: S9 - Participant; BGT: S10 - Finalist; ČSMT: S6 - Semi-finalist; AGTC : S1 - Participant; AuGT S9 - Participant	5	Eliminated
Alexa Lauenburger	Dog Act	DS: S11 - Winner	2	Finalist
Antonio Sorgentone	Singer & Pianist	IGT: S9 - Winner	2	Eliminated
Ashleigh & Sully	Dog Act	BGT: S6 - Winner; AGTC : S1 - Participant	1	Eliminated
Bad Salsa	Salsa Dance Duo	InGT: S4 - Winner	1	Eliminated
Bars & Melody	Rapper & Singer	BGT: S8 - Third Place	5	Finalist
Bello & Annaliese Nock	Comic Daredevil Duo	AGT: S12 - Quarter-finalist (Bello), S13 - Participant (Annaliese)	1	Finalist
Ben Hart	Magician	BGT: S13 - Third Place	5	Eliminated
Billy & Emily England	Rollerskating Duo	BGT: S9 - Semi-finalist; AGT: S12 - Semifinalist; AGTC : S1 - Participant	4	Eliminated
Bonnie Anderson	Singer	AuGT: S1 - Winner	4	Eliminated
Boogie Storm	Dance Group	BGT: S10 - Third Place	1	Eliminated
Colin Thackery	Singer	BGT: S13 - Winner	4	Eliminated
Collabro	Musical Theatre Group	BGT: S8 - Winner	5	Eliminated
Connie Talbot	Singer	BGT: S1 - Finalist	1	Eliminated
Cristina Ramos	Opera & Rock Singer	GTE: S1 - Winner; AGTC : S1 - Grand-finalist	3	Eliminated
Daliso Chaponda	Stand Up Comedian	BGT: S11 - Third Place	5	Eliminated
Darcy Oake	Illusionist	BGT: S8 - Finalist; AGTC : S1 - Participant	3	Finalist
Deadly Games ^{1}	Knife Throwing Duo	AGT: S11 - Semi-finalist; FIT: S12 - Semi-Finalist; AGTC : S1 - Top 12 Finalist	2	Eliminated
DJ Arch Jnr	DJ	SAGT: S6 - Winner; AGTC : S1 - Participant	3	Eliminated
DM-X Comvaleñoz	Dance Group	PGT: S5 - Semi Finalist; AsGT : S2 - Runner Up	5	Eliminated
Gao Lin & Liu Xin	Acrobatic Duo	BGT: S11 - Participant; AsGT : S1 - Finalist	2	Eliminated
Gennady Tkachenko-Papizh	Vocalist	GGT - Participant; UMT: S6 - Finalist; DS: S12 - Finalist	5	Eliminated
George Sampson	Breakdancer	BGT: S1 - Participant; S2 - Winner	4	Eliminated
Issy Simpson	Illusionist	BGT: S11 - Runner-up; AGTC : S1 - Participant	4	Eliminated
Jack Carroll	Stand Up Comedian	BGT: S7 - Runner Up	3	Eliminated
Jai McDowall	Singer	BGT: S5 - Winner	2	Eliminated
Kseniya Simonova	Sand Artist	UMT: S1 - Winner; AGTC : S1 - Third Place	1	Third Place
Lost Voice Guy	Stand Up Comedian	BGT: S12 - Winner; AGTC : S1 - Participant	2	Eliminated
Mayyas	Dance Group	ArGT: S6 - Winner	3	Eliminated
MerseyGirls	Dance Group	BGT: S11 - Finalist	2	Finalist
Mirror Family	Dance Group	ČSMT: S5 - Finalist	4	Eliminated
Paddy & Nico	Salsa Dance Duo	BGT: S8 - Finalist; FIT: S11 - Semi-finalist	3	Finalist
Paul Potts	Opera Singer	BGT: S1 - Winner; AGTC : S1 - Top 12 Finalist	1	Eliminated
Paul Zerdin	Ventriloquist	AGT: S10 - Winner; AGTC : S1 - Participant	2	Eliminated
Preacher Lawson	Stand Up Comedian	AGT: S12 - Finalist; AGTC : S1 - Grand-finalist	4	Finalist
Richard & Adam	Singing Duo	BGT: S7 - Third Place	3	Eliminated
Richard Jones	Close Up Magician	BGT: S10 - Winner	3	Eliminated
Stavros Flatley	Comic Dance Duo	BGT: S3 - Finalist	4	Runner-up
Tape Face	Mime	AGT: S11 - Finalist; AGTC : S1 - Participant	4	Eliminated
The Fire	Dance Group	HGT: S9 - Winner	3	Eliminated
The Nelson Twins	Comedy Duo	AuGT: S6 - Finalist	1	Eliminated
The Sacred Riana	Illusionist	AsGT : S2 - Winner; AGT: S13 - Quarter-finalist	1	Eliminated
Twist and Pulse	Comic Dance Duo	BGT: S4 - Runner-up	5	Winner
Vicki Barbolak	Stand Up Comedian	AGT: S13 - Finalist; AGTC : S1 - Participant	5	Eliminated

- ^1 The original couple for Deadly Games split up after their last performance together. While the knife-thrower, Alfredo Silva, remained to continue under this name, his partner was replaced by the winner of the 8th series of Poland's Got Talent for this contest.

=== Preliminaries ===
In each preliminary, nine participants perform their act. A judge is assigned a Golden Buzzer, which automatically advances an act to the finale. After all participants have performed, a group of 250 "superfans", in the audience, selected to represent the public will vote for their favourite act, with only one from each preliminary advancing alongside the chosen Golden Buzzer act.

Golden Buzzer Advancement | Advanced - 1st in Superfan Vote | Eliminated - 2nd in Superfan Vote
Eliminated - 3rd in Superfan Vote | Eliminated | Buzzed Out

==== Preliminaries 1 (31 August) ====
Participant	Order	Act	Buzzes				Finished
Participant	Order	Act	Cowell	Holden	Dixon	Walliams	Finished
Ashleigh & Sully	1	Dog Act					Eliminated (3rd in Superfan Vote)
Bello & Annaliese Nock	2	Comic Daredevil Duo					Advanced (Won Superfan Vote)
Connie Talbot	3	Singer					Eliminated
The Nelson Twins	4	Comedy Duo					Eliminated
Bad Salsa	5	Salsa Dance Duo					Eliminated
Kseniya Simonova	6	Sand Artist					Golden Buzzer Advancement
Boogie Storm	7	Dance Group					Eliminated (2nd in Superfan Vote)
The Sacred Riana	8	Illusionist					Eliminated
Paul Potts	9	Opera Singer					Eliminated

==== Preliminaries 2 (7 September) ====
Participant	Order	Act	Buzzes				Finished
Participant	Order	Act	Cowell	Holden	Dixon	Walliams	Finished
100 Voices of Gospel	1	Gospel Choir					Eliminated
Lost Voice Guy	2	Stand Up Comedian					Eliminated
Alexa Lauenburger	3	Dog Act					Golden Buzzer Advancement
Paul Zerdin	4	Ventriloquist					Eliminated (2nd in Superfan Vote)
Gao Lin & Liu Xin	5	Acrobatic Duo					Eliminated
Antonio Sorgentone	6	Singer & Pianist					Eliminated (3rd in Superfan Vote)
MerseyGirls	7	Dance Group					Advanced (Won Superfan Vote)
Deadly Games	8	Knife Throwing Duo					Eliminated
Jai McDowall	9	Singer					Eliminated

==== Preliminaries 3 (14 September) ====
Participant	Order	Act	Buzzes				Finished
Participant	Order	Act	Cowell	Holden	Dixon	Walliams	Finished
Richard Jones	1	Close Up Magician					Eliminated (2nd in Superfan Vote)
Mayyas	2	Dance Group					Eliminated
DJ Arch Jr	3	DJ					Eliminated (3rd in Superfan Vote)
Jack Carroll	4	Stand Up Comedian					Eliminated
Paddy & Nico	5	Salsa Dance Duo					Golden Buzzer Advancement
Richard & Adam	6	Singing Duo					Eliminated
The Fire	7	Dance Group					Eliminated
Darcy Oake	8	Illusionist					Advanced (Won Superfan Vote)
Cristina Ramos	9	Singer					Eliminated

==== Preliminaries 4 (21 September) ====
Participant	Order	Act	Buzzes				Finished
Participant	Order	Act	Cowell	Holden	Dixon	Walliams	Finished
George Sampson	1	Breakdancer					Eliminated
Bonnie Anderson	2	Singer					Eliminated
Issy Simpson	3	Illusionist					Eliminated
Mirror Family	4	Dance Group					Eliminated
Tape Face	5	Mime					Eliminated
Preacher Lawson	6	Stand Up Comedian					Advanced (Won Superfan Vote)
Stavros Flatley	7	Comic Dance Duo					Golden Buzzer Advancement
Colin Thackery	8	Singer					Eliminated (2nd in Superfan Vote)
Billy & Emily England	9	Rollerskating Duo					Eliminated (3rd in Superfan Vote)

==== Preliminaries 5 (28 September) ====
Participant	Order	Act	Buzzes				Finished
Participant	Order	Act	Cowell	Holden	Dixon	Walliams	Finished
Daliso Chaponda	1	Stand Up Comedian					Eliminated
DM-X Comvaleñoz	2	Dance Group					Eliminated
Ben Hart	3	Magician					Eliminated
Alex Magala	4	Sword Swallower					Eliminated (2nd in Superfan Vote)
Bars & Melody	5	Rapper & Singer					Advanced (Won Superfan Vote)
Gennady Tkachenko-Papizh	6	Vocalist					Eliminated
Vicki Barbolak	7	Stand Up Comedian					Eliminated
Twist & Pulse	8	Comic Dance Duo					Golden Buzzer Advancement
Collabro	9	Musical Theatre Group					Eliminated (3rd in Superfan Vote)

=== Grand Final (5 October) ===
Winner | Runner-up | 3rd place | Finalist

Finalist	Order	Act	Finished
Bars & Melody	1	Rapper & Singer	Finalist
Preacher Lawson	2	Stand Up Comedian	Finalist
Kseniya Simonova	3	Sand Artist	Third Place
Darcy Oake	4	Illusionist	Finalist
MerseyGirls	5	Dance Group	Finalist
Bello & Annaliese Nock	6	Comic Daredevil Duo	Finalist
Twist & Pulse	7	Comic Dance Duo	Winner
Alexa Lauenburger	8	Dog Act	Finalist
Stavros Flatley	9	Comedy Dance Duo	Runner-Up
Paddy & Nico	10	Salsa Dance Duo	Finalist

== Ratings ==
Episode	Air date	Total viewers (millions) ^{a}	ITV weekly rank
Preliminary 1	31 August	7.20	1
Preliminary 2	7 September	6.23	5
Preliminary 3	14 September	5.89	8
Preliminary 4	21 September	5.07	13
Preliminary 5	28 September	5.21	14
Final	5 October	5.63	13

=== Notes ===
- ^a The ratings over a 7-day period, including the broadcasts on ITV and streaming through ITV Hub using BARB's four-screen dashboard system (includes viewers watching on tablets/smartphones).
