= India's Got Talent season 3 =

Indian TV show

India's Got Talent
- Season 3
- Hosted by: Meiyang Chang; Gautam Rode
- Judges: Dharmendra; Sonali Bendre; Kirron Kher
- Winners: Suresh and Vernon Group
- No. of episodes: 19

Release
- Original network: Colors TV
- Original release: 29 July – 1 October 2011

Season chronology
- ← Previous; Season 2 Next → Season 4

The third season of the Indian talent show competition series India's Got Talent was broadcast on Colors TV from 29 July to 24 September 2011. Meiyang Chang and Gautam Rode were roped in as the new hosts for season three. Kirron Kher and Sonali Bendre returned for their third season each while Dharmendra joined as the third judge, replacing Sajid Khan.

The season was won by the Suresh and Vernon Group, who were season two's runners-up. They won ₹50,00,000 (50 lakhs INR) along with a trophy.

== Season overview ==
No major changes were made to the format of the show except that the wildcard round was removed for this season.

Of the participants who auditioned for this season, forty-eight contestants made it to the quarter-finals, with seven, eight or nine quarter-finalists in each one. Among the forty-eight, only eighteen made it past to the semi-finals with six appearing in each one, and six securing a place in the pre-finale. Only four participants performed in the grand finale. The following below lists the results of each participant's overall performance in this season:

Winner | Finalist | Semi-finalist | Quarter-finalist

| Participant | Age(s) | Genre | Act | From | Quarter-Final | Result |

=== Quarter Finals Summary ===
Buzzed Out | Judges' Choice | Won the Public Vote
Won the Judges' Vote | Lost the Judges' Vote

==== Quarter-final 1 (26 August) ====
| Quarter-Finalist | Order | Buzzes and Judges' votes | | | Finished |
| Quarter-Finalist | Order | Kirron | Sonali | Dharmendra | Finished |
|---|---|---|---|---|---|
| Ellyraja | 1 | | | | Eliminated |
| Sumit | 2 | | | | Eliminated |
| Srikant Ahire & Team | 3 | | | | Eliminated (Lost Judges' Vote) |
| Ali Brothers | 4 | | | | Advanced (Won Judges' Vote) |
| Subrat & Esak | 5 | | | | Advanced (Won Public Vote) |
| Binoy Debnath | 6 | | | | Eliminated |
| Bad Salsa | 7 | | | | Advanced (Won Public Vote) |

==== Quarter-final 2 (27 August) ====
- Special Guest: Salman Khan

| Quarter-Finalist | Order | Buzzes and Judges' votes | | | Result |
| Quarter-Finalist | Order | Kirron | Sonali | Dharmendra | Result |
|---|---|---|---|---|---|
| Bombay Rock Project | 1 | | | | Eliminated |
| Avjit & Tinku | 2 | | | | Advanced (Won Judges' Vote) |
| Pranali | 3 | | | | Eliminated |
| Ehsaan Bharti | 4 | | | | Advanced (Won Public Vote) |
| Sandeep Lathar | 5 | | | | Eliminated |
| Vilas Naik | 6 | | | | Advanced (Won Public Vote) |
| Govind Menon | 7 | | | | Eliminated (Lost Judges' Vote) |
| Amrapali Group | 8 | | | | Eliminated |

==== Quarter-final 3 (2 September) ====
| Quarter-Finalist | Order | Buzzes and Judges' votes | | | Result |
| Quarter-Finalist | Order | Kirron | Sonali | Dharmendra | Result |
|---|---|---|---|---|---|
| Indian Saber | 1 | | | | Advanced (Won Judges' Vote) |
| Pooja Surve | 2 | | | | Eliminated |
| Sanjay Dhaka | 3 | | | | Advanced (Won Public Vote) |
| Tushar Arjun | 4 | | | | Eliminated |
| Priyanka Keni | 5 | | | | Eliminated |
| Mad It | 6 | | | | Eliminated (Lost Judges' Vote) |
| Ballos Folk | 7 | | | | Eliminated |
| Angels & Grooves | 8 | | | | Advanced (Won Public Vote) |

==== Quarter-final 4 (3 September) ====
- Special Guests: Tusshar Kapoor & Shreyas Talpade

| Quarter-Finalist | Order | Buzzes and Judges' votes | | | Result |
| Quarter-Finalist | Order | Kirron | Sonali | Dharmendra | Result |
|---|---|---|---|---|---|
| Kuddroli Ganesh | 1 | | | | Advanced (Won Public Vote) |
| Digvijay & Ankit | 2 | | | | Advanced (Won Judges' Vote) |
| Sabah Bari | 3 | | | | Eliminated |
| Faith in Action | 4 | | | | Advanced (Won Public Vote) |
| Prajwal | 5 | | | | Eliminated |
| Prateek Joseph | 6 | | | | Eliminated |
| Aditya & Priyanshu | 7 | | | | Eliminated (Lost Judges' Vote) |
| Goutamdas Boul | 8 | | | | Eliminated |

==== Quarter-final 5 (9 September) ====
| Quarter-Finalist | Order | Buzzes and Judges' votes | | | Result |
| Quarter-Finalist | Order | Kirron | Sonali | Dharmendra | Result |
|---|---|---|---|---|---|
| DfrenStrokes | 1 | | | | Advanced |
| Tarantismo Dance Troupe | 2 | | | | Eliminated |
| Sabyasachi & Amar Sen | 3 | | | | Eliminated |
| Dunes of Rajasthan | 4 | | | | Advanced (Won Public Vote) |
| Anchal Kumawat | 5 | | | | Eliminated |
| Rayes & Shehla | 6 | | | | Advanced (Won Judges' Vote) |
| Devang Pandey | 7 | | | | Eliminated (Lost Judges' Vote) |
| Siddesh Malankar Group | 8 | | | | Eliminated |
| Suresh & Vernon Group | 9 | | | | Advanced (Won Public Vote) |

==== Quarter-final 6 (10 September) ====
- Special Guests: Katrina Kaif, Imran Khan & Ali Zafar

| Quarter Finalist | Order | Buzzes and Judges' votes | | | Result |
| Quarter Finalist | Order | Kirron | Sonali | Dharmendra | Result |
|---|---|---|---|---|---|
| Nawaz Sabri & Party | 1 | | | | Eliminated |
| Subash Chander | 2 | | | | Eliminated |
| Jinu Joy | 3 | | | | Eliminated |
| RockStars | 4 | | | | Eliminated |
| Madhavas | 5 | | | | Advanced (Won Public Vote) |
| The Show Stoppers | 6 | | | | Advanced (Won Judges' Vote) |
| Dance Oceans Group | 7 | | | | Eliminated |
| Swarali Sangeet | 8 | | | | Advanced (Won Public Vote) |

=== Semi-finals Summary ===
Buzzed Out | Advanced to Pre Finale

==== Semi-final 1 (16 September) ====
| Semi-Finalist | Order | Buzzes | | | Result |
| Semi-Finalist | Order | Kirron | Sonali | Dharmendra | Result |
|---|---|---|---|---|---|
| Indian Saber | 1 | | | | Eliminated |
| Faith in Action | 2 | | | | Eliminated |
| Ali Brothers | 3 | | | | Eliminated |
| Sanjay Dhaka | 4 | | | | Advanced (Note: No data is available to determine who were the judges' pick and audience pick among these two, so, it is mentioned "Advanced" only.) |
| Subrat & Ishak | 5 | | | | Eliminated |
| Vilas Naik | 6 | | | | Advanced |

==== Semi-final 2 (17 September) ====
- Special Guest: John Abraham & Genelia Deshmukh

| Semi-Finalist | Order | Buzzes | | | Result |
| Semi-Finalist | Order | Kirron | Sonali | Dharmendra | Result |
|---|---|---|---|---|---|
| Avijit & Tinku | 1 | | | | Eliminated |
| Ehsaan Bharti | 2 | | | | Eliminated |
| Kudroli Ganesh | 3 | | | | Advanced |
| Bad Salsa Group | 4 | | | | Advanced |
| Angels & Grooves | 5 | | | | Eliminated |
| Digvijay & Ankit | 6 | | | | Eliminated |

==== Semi-final 3 (23 September) ====
- Special Guests: Sonam Kapoor & Shahid Kapoor

| Semi-Finalist | Order | Buzzes | | | Result |
| Semi-Finalist | Order | Kirron | Sonali | Dharmendra | Result |
|---|---|---|---|---|---|
| Suresh and Vernon Group | 1 | | | | Advanced |
| Madhavas | 2 | | | | Advanced |
| Dunes of Rajasthan | 3 | | | | Eliminated |
| Rayes & Shehla | 4 | | | | Eliminated |
| Swarali Sangeet | 5 | | | | Eliminated |
| The Show Stoppers | 6 | | | | Eliminated |

=== Finals Summary ===
Winner (Top 4 Final Only) | Advanced (Top 6 Finals only) | Eliminated (Top 6 Finals only) | Buzzed Out (Top 6 Finals Only)

==== Pre Finale - Top 6 (24 September) ====
- Special Guests: Hema Malini and Esha Deol

| Pre-Finalist | Order | Buzzes | | | Result |
| Pre-Finalist | Order | Kirron | Sonali | Dharmendra | Result |
|---|---|---|---|---|---|
| Vilas Nayak | 1 | | | | Advanced |
| Sanjay Dhaka | 2 | | | | Advanced |
| Kudroli Ganesh | 3 | | | | Advanced |
| Bad Salsa Group | 4 | | | | Eliminated |
| Madhavas | 5 | | | | Eliminated |
| Suresh and Vernon Group | 6 | | | | Advanced |

==== Grand Finale (1 October) ====
- Special Guest: Shah Rukh Khan Rashami Desai
- Guest Performances: Shillong Chamber Choir and Prince Dance Group

| Grand-Finalist | Result |
|---|---|
| Suresh and Vernon Group | 1st |
| Vilas Nayak | Grand-finalist |
| Kudroli Ganesh | Grand-finalist |
| Sanjay Dhaka | Grand-finalist |
