= Shillong Chamber Choir =

Indian chamber choir

- Choir
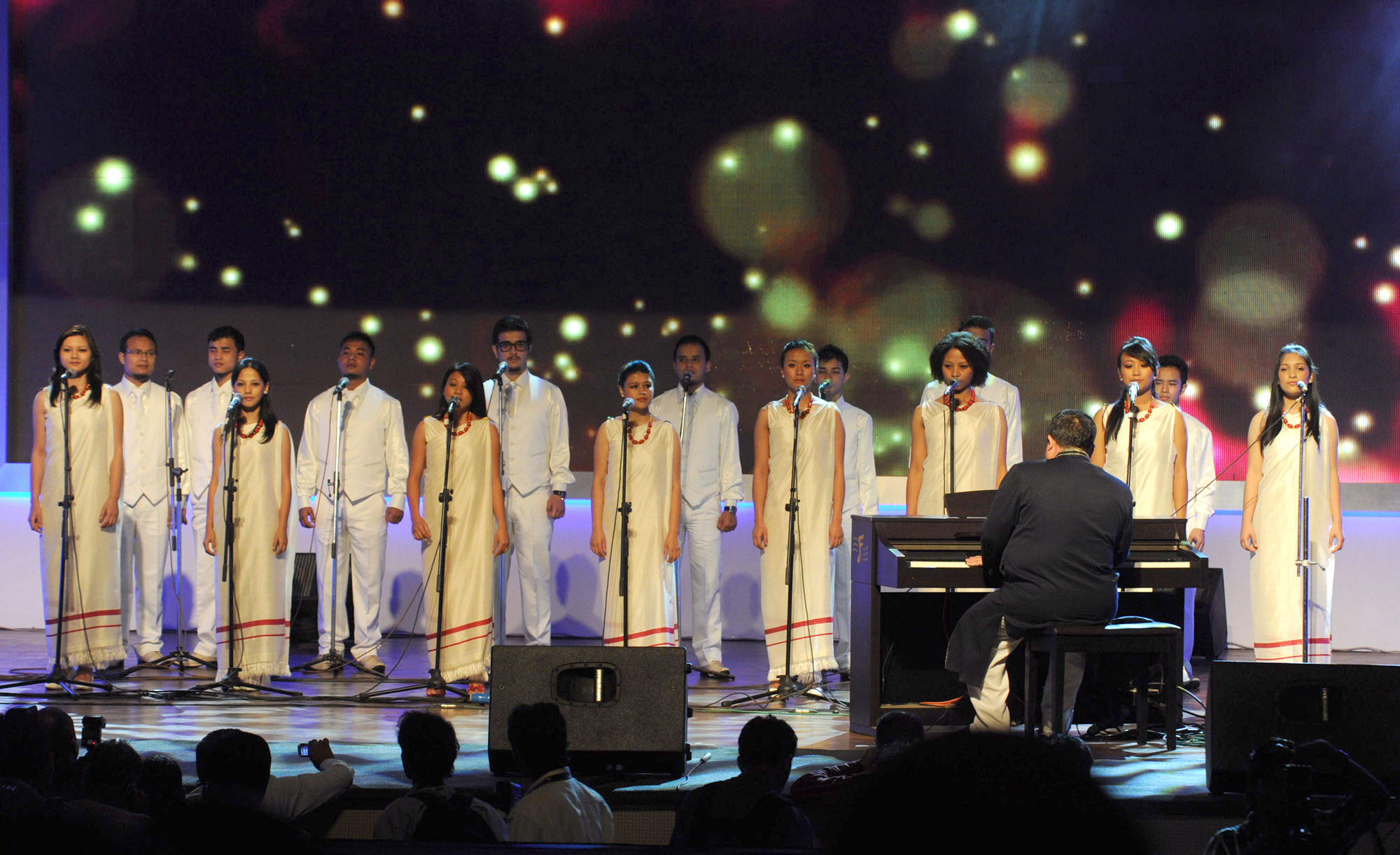
- Shillong Chamber Choir performing at inaugural ceremony of 42nd International Film Festival of India in 2011
- Origin: Shillong, Meghalaya
- Founded: 2001
- Members: 11 (eleven singers and musicians/soloists)
- Music director: Neil Nongkynrih
- Chief conductor: Neil Nongkynrih
- Website: www.shillongchamberchoir.com

Shillong Chamber Choir is an Indian chamber choir based in Shillong, Meghalaya that was founded in 2001. It received fame after winning the reality talent show, India's Got Talent (Season 2) in October 2010, on Colours TV, part of the Got Talent franchise, where it performed western chorals, as well as choral-style revamps of Hindi film (Bollywood) classics.

The choir consists of 11 singers and occasionally a 30-piece orchestra. They are based in Shillong, Meghalaya, which sits in the North-Eastern part of India. The choir participated in the 6th World Choir Games held at Shaoxing China (Shanghai) in July 2010 and was awarded Gold diplomas in all three categories: Musica Sacra, Gospel, and Popular.

Shillong Chamber Choir is among Indian choirs like Bombay Madrigal Singers, Madras Musical Association, Paranjoti Academy Chorus, founded by Victor Paranjoti, and Delhi Chamber Choir.

== History ==
=== The foundation ===
The Shillong Chamber Choir was founded in 2001 by Neil Nongkynrih, a composer, conductor, and pianist from Shillong, India. Growing up in a family of musicians, Nongkynrih began playing the piano at a young age and studied music at the Delhi School of Music and the Guildhall School of Music and Drama in London. After returning to India, he became involved in the music scene in Shillong. Nongkynrih saw an opportunity to bring Indian and Western classical music together and founded the Shillong Chamber Choir with like-minded musicians. The choir's name reflects its roots in Shillong and its focus on chamber music and more intimate performances.

=== 2001-2010: The Early Years ===
The Choir made their debut performance as a group at the Pinewood Hotel in Shillong on January 14 and 15, 2001, and were mentored by Nongkynrih as their maestro. Since then, the choir has been awarded all three Gold diplomas in the categories Musica Sacra, Gospel, and Popular, which they competed in at the 6th World Choir Games held at Shaoxing, China in July 2010, winning against 400 choir groups from over 82 countries. They were selected to represent India by the Indian Council for Cultural Relations. Their visit was sponsored by The Ministry of Development of North Eastern Region. The Choir mainly gained attention for their choral-style revamps of old Bollywood classics while competing on the reality television talent show India’s Got Talent in its second season back in 2010 and went on to win it. In December 2010, the Choir won the CNN-IBN Indian of the Year – Special Achievement Award. Since their victory on India's Got Talent, the choir has performed across several parts of India and toured many countries as diplomatic representatives for events across the globe. On 8 November 2010, they performed for then President of the United States Barack Obama and his wife Michelle Obama at Indian President Pratibha Patil’s presidential banquet in the Rashtrapati Bhavan.

=== 2011-2019: The growth years ===
On 28 and 29 October 2011, they performed again with The Vienna Chamber Orchestra in Shillong in a concert called "Bollywood Leitmotifs Also..." whereby melodies from Indian cinematic music were revamped for the choir and orchestra by their conductor Neil Nongkynrih. On 30 October 2011, they collaborated with Shankar, Ehsaan and Loy at the second Global Indian Music Awards (GIMA) which was shown on Colors channel. In 2015, Nongkynrih founder, mentor and conductor of the group was awarded Padma Shri, the fourth highest civilian award of India. They collaborated with renowned musicians and performed at various events, establishing their reputation.

In March 2013, the choir performed at a fundraiser organized by actor Rahul Bose’s NGO, The Foundation, in Mumbai. They collaborated with the tabla maestro, Ustad Zakir Hussain, for the performance. They showcased an hour-long recital that featured opera, Bollywood favorites, a tabla-piano medley, and a solo by the Ustad. In 2014, they opened for the grand premiere of Kaun Banega Crorepati 8 at Surat, Gujarat and also opened for the music launch of Shah Rukh Khan’s film ‘Happy New Year’. The same year, they collaborated with the State Election Commission and created a music video entitled Just One to promote voting. They again collaborated with Bachchan for a fundraiser in Jodhpur in 2015 and finally in 2016 for the Global Citizen India Concert in Mumbai which also saw acts like Jay Z and Coldplay.

April 2017 saw the choir perform their melodies at the opening ceremony of IPL in Kolkata. The choir has participated in some of the most notable national events, including the Republic Day in Shillong in 2018. Another noted event was the telecast of their rendition of Vande Mataram- I’m So Proud To Be An Indian during the attempted satellite landing of Chandrayaan 2, which aired live on National Geographic on 6 September 2019.

== Musical style and influences ==
The Shillong Chamber Choir is known for blending Western classical music with Indian melodies and rhythms. Their repertoire includes various musical genres, including choral arrangements of popular Bollywood songs and classical and contemporary Western pieces. They have also experimented with fusion music, collaborating with artists from different musical traditions. Their repertoire is a variation of different varieties and genres from jazz to Western Classical to Bollywood and more. As a choir, they have sung in over 15 languages, including Khasi, French, Hindi.

=== Themes ===
The themes explored by the Shillong Chamber Choir's music range from love and relationships to social issues and spirituality. Their music often reflects the cultural diversity of India, exploring themes related to different regions and traditions. The choir draws their inspiration from different genres of music worldwide, including rock bands like Queen.

== Members ==
The choir has a choral frame comprising the Sopranos, Altos, Tenors, and Bass.

The Sopranos are the female lead singer Ibarisha Lyngdoh, Patricia Lyngdoh, and Jessica Lyngdoh. The Altos comprise Donna Marthong, Rishila Merang Jamir, Keviseno Terhuja, and Dorea Rangad. The Tenors are Riewbankit Lyndem, Sandon Melam Lyndem, and William Richmond, the frontman. The Bass singer is Banlam Lyndem.
