= India's Got Talent season 5 =

Indian TV show

India's Got Talent
- Season 5
- Promotional poster for season 5, featuring judges (L to R) judges Kher, Johar and Khan.
- Presented by: Bharti Singh; Mantra (auditions); VJ Andy (finals)
- Judges: Kirron Kher; Karan Johar; Malaika Arora Khan; Madhuri Dixit (guest)
- Winners: Ragini Makkar & Naadyog Academy
- No. of episodes: 17

Release
- Original network: Colors TV
- Original release: 11 January – 8 March 2014

Season chronology
- ← Previous; Season 4 Next → Season 6

The fifth season of India's Got Talent premiered on 11 January 2014. Bharti Singh returned to present the show along with Mantra in auditions and VJ Andy in the semi-finals and finals. Malaika Arora Khan and Karan Johar returned for their second season each, while Kirron Kher returned for her fifth season.

Ragini Makkar and Naadyog Academy won the season winning ₹50,00,000 (50 lakhs) along with a trophy and a Maruti car from the title sponsor on 8 March 2024.

== Season overview ==
Logo used for the fifth season.

The fifth season was announced an year later the conclusion of the previous season with the same judging panel including Kirron Kher, Karan Johar and Malaika Arora. Bharti Singh and Mantra joined as the hosts, but later, prior to the beginning of the semi-finals, VJ Andy was roped in place of Mantra due to prior shooting commitments.

During an audition day, Karan Johar was absent due to his film productions and hence, Madhuri Dixit stood up for him.

By the time that the public auditions for the fifth season's competition had begun, the Got Talent franchise was beginning to update its format for auditions across international editions through the inclusion of a new feature – the "Golden Buzzer", placed in front of the stage, far from judges' desk. First introduced on Germany's Got Talent, the new format meant that those auditioning for a place in the semi-finals of the competition for this year could earn an automatic place in the semi-finals, without competing in Hoonar Chakra round. It can be pressed by any of the judges, twice, regardless of the opinions about their performance.

Of the participants that took part, thirty made it past this stage and into the five semi-finals. Amongst the thirty, Shri Ramnataka Niketan and Ki Umjer got the golden buzzer from Kirron Kher, SMS Group and Saei Jamshed from Karan Johar and Beat Breakers and Shounak & Shreya from Malaika Arora Khan during the auditions. Six acts appeared in each semi-final, with two advancing to the finale, one by the public vote and another by the choice of judges amongst the second and third position in the public vote. This year, the judges chose two wildcard contestants, Rohit Jaiswal and Negative Vibes, who were eliminated in the culling and put them in the fifth semi-final along with the other four original acts for the public vote. The following below lists the results of each participant's overall performance in this season:

Winner | Finalist | Semi-finalist
Judges' Wildcard Semi-Finalist | Golden Buzzer Audition

Participant	Age(s)	Genre	Act	Semi-final	Finished
Akshat Singh	7	Dance	Dancer	1	Eliminated
Amit & Sakshi		Dance	Dance Duo	5	Eliminated
Anasua Chowdhury	18	Dance	Kathak Dancer		Finalist
Anshu Kumar	12	Dance	Contemporary Dancer		Finalist
Beat Breakers	8–20	Dance	Acrobatics Dance Group		Finalist
Enthrall Crew	10–21	Variety	Yoga & Acrobatics Group		Eliminated
First Look Crew	7–23	Dance	Hip Hop Dance Group		Eliminated
Funny Boys	17–18	Dance	Dancing Trio		Finalist
Gunjan Sharma	30	Acrobatics	Strength Act		Eliminated
Hargun Kaur	17	Music	Singer		Finalist
Hassan Rizvi	26	Magic	Magician		Finalist
IFI Sports Academy	7–23	Variety	Parkour Group		Eliminated
Indian School of Yoga	19 & 21	Variety	Yoga Display	4	Eliminated
Indushree Raveendra	27	Comedy	Ventriloquist Artist	4	Eliminated
Jayvijay Sachan	28	Comedy	Mimicry Artist		Eliminated
Jumping Jacks	10–24	Acrobatics	Acrobatics Group	3	Eliminated
Ki Umjer	19–30	Music	Acapella Group	3	Eliminated
Negative Vibes					Eliminated
Ragini Makkar and Naadyog	18–32	Dance	Kathak Dance Group		Winner
Rakesh & Samina	26 & 27	Variety	Aerial Circus Duo		Eliminated
Rohit Jaiswal	26	Acrobatics	Acrobat		Finalist
Ruturaj Shirodkar					Eliminated
Saei Jamshed	13	Music	Pianist		Finalist
Sarika Bijli		Dance			Eliminated
Shounak & Shreya		Dance			Eliminated
Shri Ramnataka Niketan		Dance			Eliminated
Silver Steppers					Eliminated
SMS Group		Variety			Eliminated
Subhreet Kaur		Dance	One-legged Dancer		Finalist
Suman & Anisha					Eliminated

=== Golden Buzzer Summary ===
Kirron Kher	Karan Johar	Malaika Arora Khan
Sri Ramnataka Niketan Classical Dance Group	SMS Group Sand Artists Trio	Beat Breakers Acrobatics Dance Group
Ki Umjer Acapella Group	Saei Jamshed Pianist	Shounak & Shreya Duo Dancers

=== Semi-finals Summary ===
Buzzed | Judges' Vote | Judges' Wildcard Semi-Finalist | Won the Public Vote
Won the Judges' Vote | Lost the Judges' Vote | Eliminated

==== Semi-final 1 (16 February) ====
Semi-Finalist	Order	Buzzes and Judges' votes			Result
Semi-Finalist	Order	Kirron	Karan	Malaika	Result
Akshat Singh	1				Eliminated
Hassan Rizvi	2				Advanced (Won Public Vote)
Funny Boys	3				Advanced (Won Judges' Vote)
Jayvijay Sachan	4				Eliminated
First Look Crew	5				Eliminated (Lost Judges' Vote)
IFI Sports Academy	6				Eliminated

==== Semi-final 2 (22 February) ====
- Special Guest: Raveena Tandon

Semi-Finalist	Order	Buzzes and Judges' votes			Result
Semi-Finalist	Order	Kirron	Karan	Malaika	Result
Enthrall Crew	1				Eliminated
Rakesh & Samina	2				Eliminated
Saei Jamshed	3				Advanced (Won Public Vote)
Suman & Anisha	4				Eliminated
SMS Group	5				Eliminated (Lost Judges' Vote)
Anshu Kumar	6				Advanced (Won Judges' Vote)

==== Semi-final 3 (23 February) ====
- Guest Performance: Kapil Sharma from Comedy Nights with Kapil
- Special Guest: Alia Bhatt

Semi-Finalist	Order	Buzzes and Judges' votes			Result
Semi-Finalist	Order	Kirron	Karan	Malaika	Result
Silver Steppers	1				Eliminated
Ragini Makkar and Naadyog	2				Advanced (Won Judges' Vote)
Ki Umjer	3				Eliminated
Subhreet Kaur	4				Advanced (Won Public Vote)
Jumping Jacks	5				Eliminated (Lost Judges' Vote)
Sarika Bijli	6				Eliminated

==== Semi-final 4 (1 March) ====
- Special Guest: Kangana Ranaut

Semi-Finalist	Order	Buzzes and Judges' votes			Result
Semi-Finalist	Order	Kirron	Karan	Malaika	Result
Beat Breakers	1				Advanced (Won Judges' Vote)
Gunjan Sharma	2				Eliminated
Indian School of Yoga	3				Eliminated (Lost Judges' Vote)
Shounak & Shreya	4				Eliminated
Hargun Kaur	5				Advanced (Won Public Vote)
Indushree Raveendra	6				Eliminated

==== Semi-final 5 (7 March) ====
- Special Guests: Varun Dhawan, Ileana D'Cruz, Nargis Fakhri and Ali Zafar

Semi-Finalist	Order	Buzzes and Judges' votes			Result
Semi-Finalist	Order	Kirron	Karan	Malaika	Result
Shri Ramnataka Niketan	1				Eliminated (Lost Judges' Vote)
Amit & Sakshi	2				Eliminated
Ruturaj Shirodkar	3				Eliminated
Anasua Chowdhury	4				Advanced (Won Judges' Vote)
Negative Vibes	5				Eliminated
Rohit Jaiswal	6				Advanced (Won Public Vote)

=== Grand Finale (8 March) ===
Winner | Top 4 | Eliminated from Top 4

- Special Guests: Madhuri Dixit, Juhi Chawla and Amitabh Bachchan

Finalist	Result		
Finalist	Result	Anshu Kumar	Finalist
Anasua Chowdhury	Finalist		
Saei Jamshed	Top 4 Finalist		
Ragini Makkar and Naadyog Academy	1st		
Subhreet Kaur	Top 4		
Hargun Kaur	Finalist		
Funny Boys	Finalist		
Beat Breakers	Top 4		
Hassan Rizwi	Finalist		
Rohit Jaiswal	Finalist		
