= Bad Salsa =

Indian salsa dancing duo

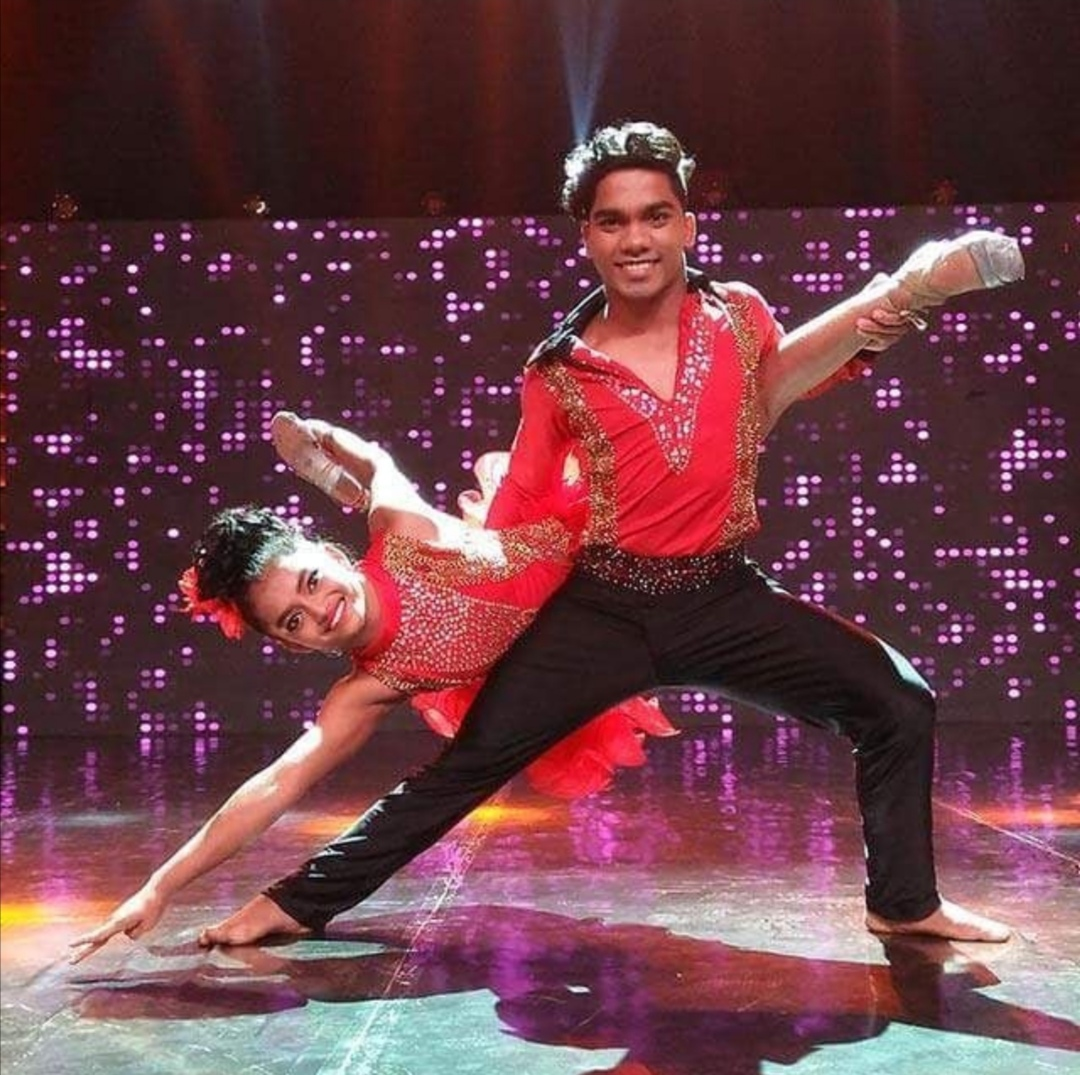
- Bad Salsa in 2019

Background information
- Origin: India
- Genre: salsa
- Years active: 2012–present
- Members: Sonali Majumdar; Maroju Samanth

Bad Salsa are an Indian salsa dancing duo that gained fame after winning the fourth season of India's Got Talent.

== Members ==
Both members of Bad Salsa have trained at The Bivash Academy of Dance in Kolkata where the two met and started competing in national dance competitions in India under the name Bad Salsa.

=== Sonali Majumdar ===
Sonali Majumdar is an Indian salsa dancer who started her career at the age of seven by participating in the fourth season of India's Got Talent alongside her partner Sumanth Maroju.

Majumdar hails from a farmer's family originally from Bagdah, a village in the Indian province of West Bengal near the border with Bangladesh.

=== Sumanth Maroju ===
Sumanth Maroju is an Indian salsa dancer who started his career at the age of thirteen by taking part in the fourth season of India's Got Talent alongside his partner Sonali Majumdar.

Maroju is originally from Bhubaneswar in the Indian state of Odisha. His father is a railway employee and his mother is a housewife.

== Career ==
Bad Salsa rose to prominence after competing in season 4 of India's Got Talent on Colors TV and winning the competition. After this, the duo participated in many national and international dance competitions.

The duo then participated in the sixth season of Jhalak Dikhhla Jaa on Colors TV and finished in third place. Bad Salsa also competed in the Indian dance reality television series Dance Champions on Star Plus in 2017, finishing at tenth place.

Internationally, the duo has also participated in ITV's Britain's Got Talent: The Champions and the fifteenth season of NBC's America's Got Talent where they emerged as a finalist.
