= Bombay Madrigal Singers =

Indian choir group

The Bombay Madrigal Singers was a choir group—promoting concerts and operas too in the western Indian city—formed in 1947 by Victor Paranjoti that initially performed sacred Western music. It had a supporting committee named the Bombay Madrigal Singers Organisation (BMSO).

== History ==
The Bombay Madrigal Singers Organisation was formed in 1947, the year of Indian Independence. After Victor Paranjoti left to form the Bombay Light Opera Sabha, and the BMSO was being run by committee members led by conductor-tenor Cesar Coelho. The choir was, according to Havaldar, mostly Goan with a few Parsis, and almost no one from any other community. The orchestra was collected ad hoc and was often formed of Bollywood musicians, which, Havaldar explained, was problematic as they would need to be coaxed away from the lure of paid employment in the film studios. But the organisation ceased activities after a while. It was inactive through the 1970s was defunct by 1980.

== Taking to the outside world ==
In the 1950s and 1960s, according to Alfred J. Braganza, the Bombay Madrigal Singers, under the baton of Victor Paranjoti, "performed with success Konkani songs collected and arranged by Prof. Lucio Rodrigues in some of the premier cities of Europe."

== Overseas participation ==
Wanting to go beyond concerts of local singers, the BMSO also began promoting concerts by international visiting classical music artists. They also promoted concerts by Indian artists. It worked with Bombay-based embassies—including the British Council, the American Consulate, the Russian Consulate and the Czech Consulate. These institutions would support and sponsor artists travelling in Asia. Visiting artistes would be asked to play for a reduced fee or free. It has been credited with bringing in "artistes and orchestras of the best calibre coming here, courtesy the Bombay Madrigal Singers Organisation (BMSO)"—including Karajan, Rubinstein, Kempff, Oistrakh, Ruggiero Ricci, the Bolshoi Ballet, Vienna Boys' Choir. Among the others who came thorough Bombay were Arthur Rubinstein, Mstislav Rostropovich, Marian Anderson, Isaac Stern, Herbert Von Karayan, the Vienna Philharmonic Orchestra, the London Symphony Orchestra and the Czech Philharmonic Orchestra.

== Operas ==
Later, the BMSO put on operas on their own, with local musicians and singers, and Cesar Coelho as conductor. In 1961, with a full Indian cast, they staged their first opera, sometimes later bringing in tenors and baritones from the UK, with British producer named Derek Bond. The cast included Indian female soloists included Goans Celia Lobo and Fay Sequeira. Between 1961 and 1967, the Bombay Madrigal Singers staged La Traviata, Tosca, Il Trovatore, Lucia di Lammermoor, Faust, Norma and Rigoletto. They used Tejpal Hall at Gwalior Tank as their concert venue over fight nights, gaining huge popularity.

== Prominent acronym ==
Marsdem comments:

As I discussed the history of Western classical music with informants, friends and acquaintances in Mumbai, two names kept recurring: the Time and Talents Club and the Bombay Madrigal Singers Organisation, most commonly referred to by its acronym BMSO. Older members of the scene would mention these names without explanation, as if it were inconceivable that I wouldn't know who, or what, they were talking about. An internet search did not reveal much; both the Time and Talents and the BMSO had become inactive before websites and social media became prevalent. Still, the more time I spent in Mumbai, the more often I heard these names, and I realised that both societies had played an integral part in the history of Western classical music in Mumbai.(p.115-116)

== Orchestras and music societies ==
In Bombay (now Mumbai), smaller orchestras and music societies existed along the way. Those named include Cecil Mendonca's Choral and Philharmonic Society in the 1940s, the Bombay Madrigal Singers’ operas in the 1960s, the Sangat Festival Orchestra, organised by the Mehli Mehta Music Foundation, "which formed for a short time each year from 1996 until just a few years ago". Bombay also had its symphony orchestras, for all but 12 years since 1920.
