= Neil Nongkynrih =

Indian concert pianist and conductor (1970–2022)

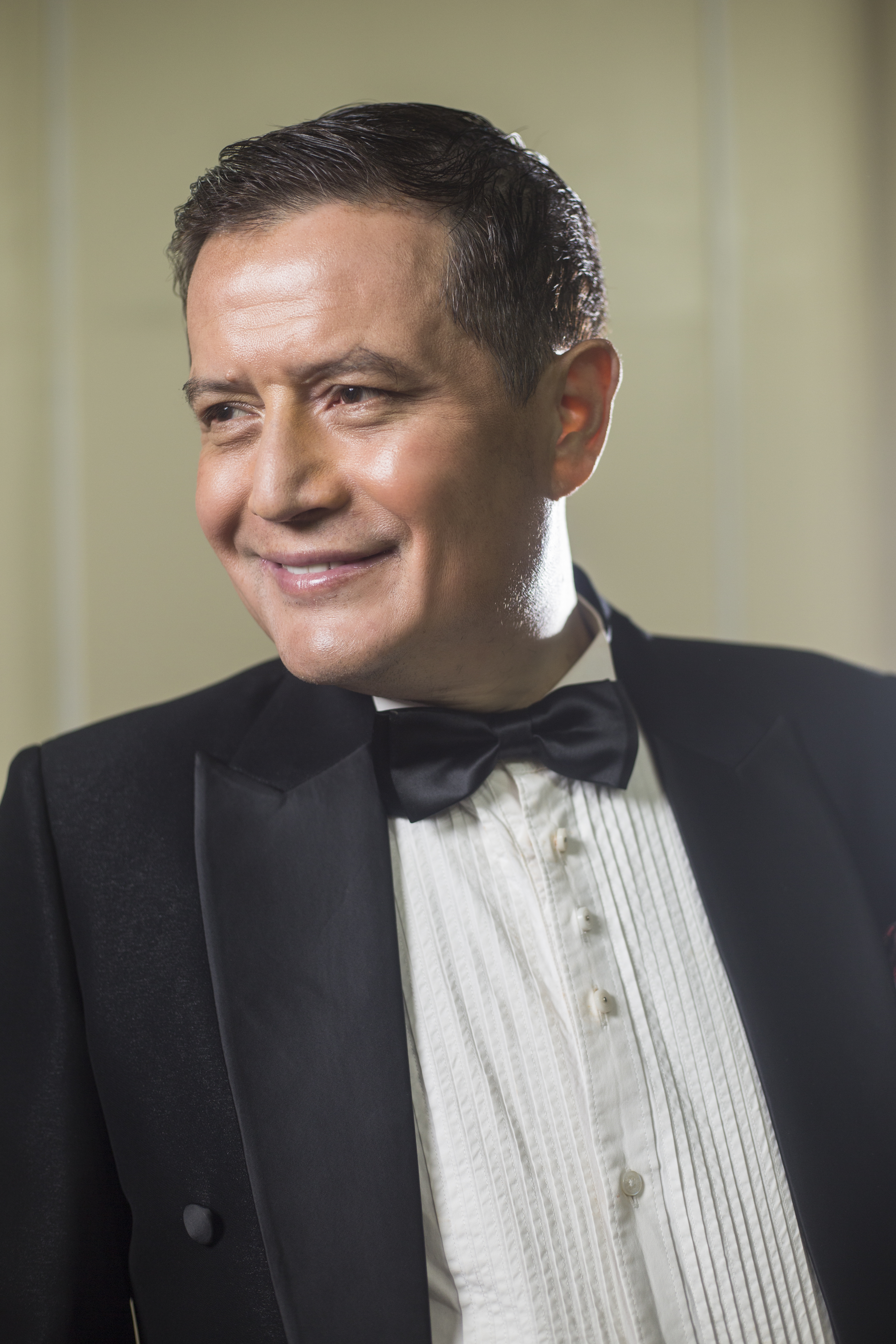
- Nongkynrih in 2020

Background information
- Born: 9 July 1970; Jaiaw Langsning, Shillong, Meghalaya, India
- Died: 5 January 2022 (aged 51) Mumbai, Maharashtra, India
- Genres: Classical, pop, jazz, Hindustani, folk, opera
- Occupations: Pianist, songwriter, keyboardist, music teacher, conductor, Central Board of Film Certification
- Instruments: Piano, keyboard
- Years active: 1987–2022
- Website: www.shillongchamberchoir.com

Neil Nongkynrih (9 July 1970 – 5 January 2022) was an Indian concert pianist and conductor. He founded the Shillong Chamber Choir (SCC), which won the reality show India's Got Talent in 2010. He was awarded Padma Shri, the fourth highest civilian award of India in 2015.

== Early life ==
Nongkynrih was born in Jaiaw Langsning, Khasi Hills district, in the then state of Assam (now East Khasi Hills district, Meghalaya state) to A. H. Scott Lyngdoh, a former state minister of Meghalaya, and Elvirial Nongkynrih. His grand- aunt introduced him to works by Mozart and Beethoven at an early age. Most of his initial lessons in music were from his sister, Pauline Warjri, a jazz musician. In 1988, against his father's wishes, he moved to the United Kingdom to study music.

== Career ==
Nongkynrih studied music at Trinity College and Guildhall School of Music in London. He performed in numerous shows as a concert pianist in United Kingdom. Nongkynrih was also teaching music in Oxfordshire in addition to the concerts. One of his students was Philip Selway, a member of the British band Radiohead. He returned to India in 2001 and started teaching piano in Shillong. In the same year, he founded the Shillong Chamber Choir (SCC).

Nongkynrih worked on a wide variety of musical genres ranging from Western and Indian classical music to Bollywood and pop medleys. He wrote an opera in Khasi, the native language of Meghalaya, with the intention to revive the dialect. The opera, titled Sohlyngngem, is based on a tragic Khasi folktale which was woven into musical lingo by Nongkynrih and his team.

=== Shillong Chamber Choir ===
Nongkynrih came back home to Shillong in India in 2001 after fourteen years in Europe leaving behind a potential career as a classical pianist there. In a later interview he referred to the violence in the region and said he had heard the sounds of the guns early in 2001 and decided that he wanted to replace it with the sound of music. From a small beginning he attracted a group of ordinary young people who made their debut as the Shillong Chamber Choir. The group covered music from folk to opera, from rock to jazz, and even included Hindustani classical and reinterpreted versions of Indian cinematic music.

The choir shot to national fame after it won the reality talent show, India's Got Talent (Season 2) in October 2010, on Colors TV, part of the Got Talent franchise, where it performed western chorals, as well as choral-style revamps of Hindi film (Bollywood) classics. Under Nongkynrih's direction, the choir participated in the 6th World Choir Games held at Shaoxing China (Shanghai) in July 2010 and was awarded Gold in all three categories viz. Musica Sacra, Gospel and Popular. The choir also performed for Barack Obama and Michelle Obama, the US President and first lady at the time, during their visit to India in 2010. The choir also worked on several projects, albums and collaborations. Nongkynrih's version of "Vande Mataram" was sung by the SCC on National Geographic during a live telecast covering the launch of Chandrayaan-2.

The SCC has performed extensively in India and has toured parts of the world. Over the years, Nongkynrih worked on revamping the Choir's repertoire with many new compositions and out of the box medleys apart from the opera Sohlyngngem that he was working on.

=== Collaborations and social causes ===
Nongkynrih collaborated with various artists. Some of his collaborations with international orchestras included the London Concertante, the Vienna Chamber Orchestra and the Fitzwilliam Quartet in Switzerland. His choir also performed with other artists, such as Boman Irani and Hariharan. A collaboration with Zakir Hussain, Usha Uthup and Shankar–Ehsaan–Loy led to a best-selling Christmas music album in 2011.

Under the SCC banner, Nongkynrih worked on projects which have contributed to notable social causes. These include:

- Collaboration with tabla maestro Ustad Zakir Hussain for 'The Foundation' of which actor Rahul Bose is the founder.
- Performances at the Gateway of India in remembrance of the 26/11 terror attacks in 2012 & 2013.
- Sang for 'Saath Hai Hum Uttarakhand' - a Star Plus fundraiser for the Uttarakhand flood relief.
- Performed with Amitabh Bachchan at the Global Citizen Festival and Jodhpur One World Retreat.

=== Other projects ===
==== Central Board of Film Certification ====
Nongkynrih was made a member of the board of India's Central Board of Film Certification (CBFC) in 2017.

==== World Choir Council ====
Earlier, in 2012, Nongkynrih was appointed by the World Choir Council for a four-year term on the council.

==== Sohlyngngem – the opera ====
One of Nongkynrih's major projects included an opera titled Sohlyngngem which was based on a tragic Khasi folktale. Even though excerpts from the opera have been performed earlier, three pieces from the opera were performed by the SCC at the MTV India Music Summit in 2019, held in Jaipur which was a highlight of the three-day musical event. At the time, he was still working on the opera, which was expected to be performed by the SCC in its entirety upon completion.

==== Home school – Shillong Chamber School ====
Nongkynrih also started a home school at his residence in Shillong for children from the region. Director Urmi Juvekar made a documentary on Nongkynrih's life, titled The Shillong Chamber Choir and the Little Home School. The documentary was exhibited at a few international movie festivals. The school was later named the Shillong Chamber School and had about 20 students in attendance as of 2016. The school's curriculum various arts like music and drama, in addition to the traditional school curriculum. The students of the school have performed with the SCC and the European Concert Orchestra in Mumbai for a Christmas Concert and also before Rajiv Bajaj and cricketer MS Dhoni at a private event in Pune.

== Honours ==
Nongkynrih was awarded the Padma Shri (the fourth highest civilian award of India) in 2015 for his contribution in the field of arts through his music. Some of his other awards included:

- Honorary doctorate for his contributions in the field of music, NIT Meghalaya, 2021
- Padma Shri, 2015
- U Tirot Sing Award, 2011
- Forbes Person of the Year, 2010–11
- Member, World Choir Council
- Member, Central Board of Film Certification, India, 2017–2022

== Death ==
Nongkynrih died at a hospital in Mumbai on 5 January 2022, at the age of 51.
