= Britain's Got Talent: The Champions =

Televised British talent competition series

- Genre: Talent show
- Created by: Simon Cowell
- Based on: America's Got Talent: The Champions by Simon Cowell
- Developed by: Britain's Got Talent by Simon Cowell
- Presented by: Anthony McPartlin; Declan Donnelly; Stephen Mulhern
- Judges: Simon Cowell; Amanda Holden; Alesha Dixon; David Walliams
- Country of origin: United Kingdom
- Original language: English
- No. of series: 1
- No. of episodes: 6

Production
- Production location: Wembley Arena
- Running time: 90 minutes
- Production companies: Syco Entertainment; Thames

Original release
- Network: ITV
- Release: 31 August 2019 – present

Related
- Britain's Got Talent; America's Got Talent: The Champions

Britain's Got Talent: The Champions is a spin-off of Britain's Got Talent, a British talent competition series, which began broadcasting on ITV on 31 August 2019. The programme functions similar to BGT, but features a selection of participants - winners, finalists and other notable acts - from across the history of both Britain's Got Talent and the Got Talent franchise, who compete in a series of preliminaries to secure a place in the grand final and a chance to win a large prize and to be crowned Britain's champion within Got Talent.

The spin-off is hosted by Anthony McPartlin and Declan Donnelly (colloquially known as Ant & Dec), and is based upon America's Got Talent: The Champions, in that the format is different to the main programme - episodes are pre-recorded, and votes for participants are conducted under a different system. The spin-off's first series averaged 5.84 million viewers across the 6 episodes during its broadcast.

== Production ==
Judges and presenter(s) for Britain's Got Talent: The Champions (2019)

Simon Cowell

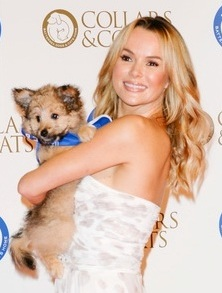
Amanda Holden

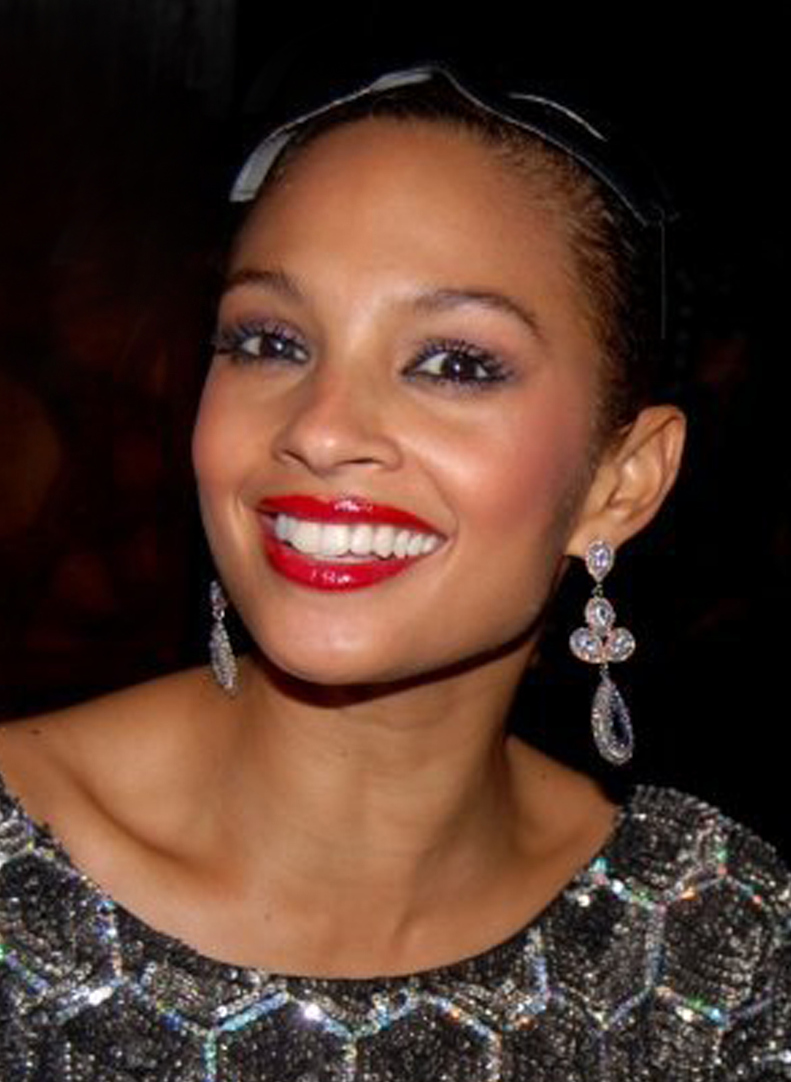
Alesha Dixon

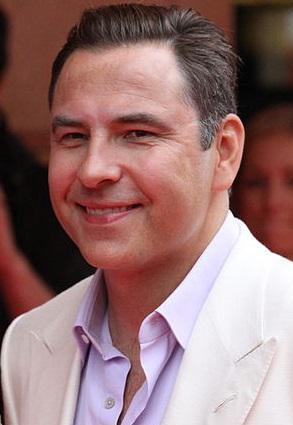
David Walliams

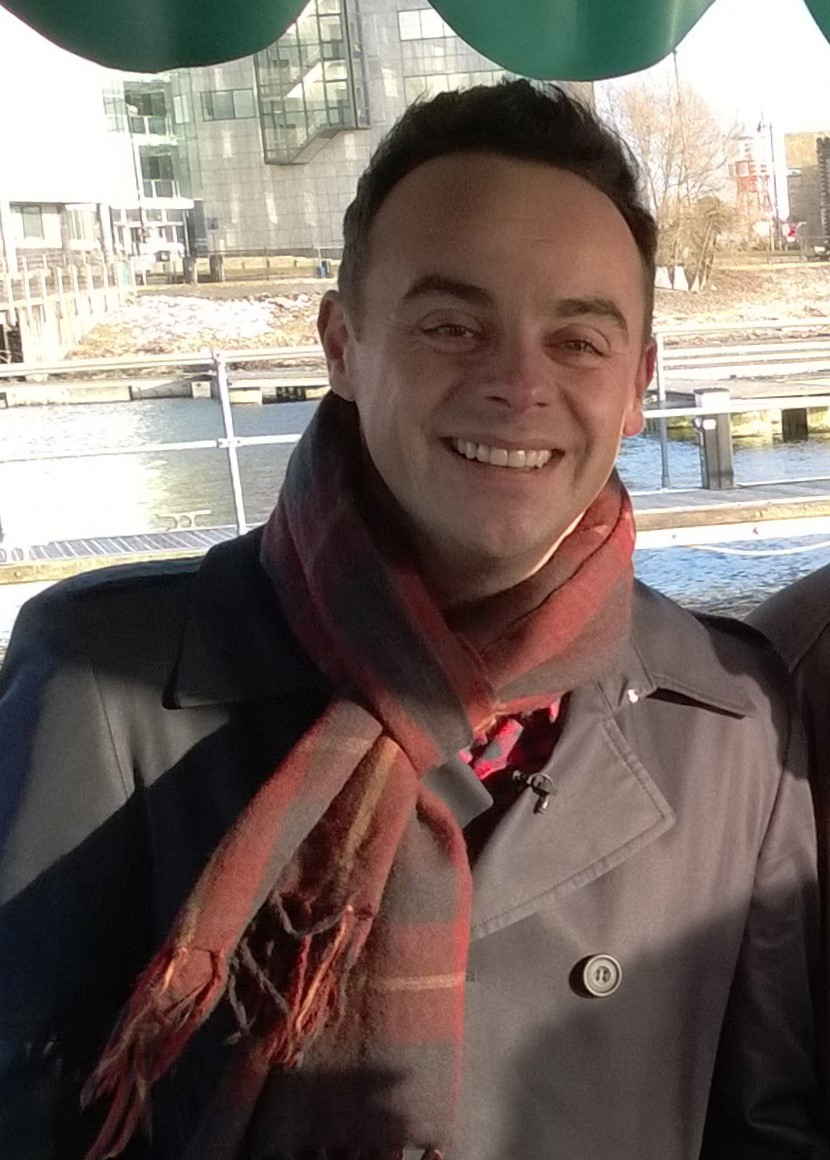
Ant McPartlin

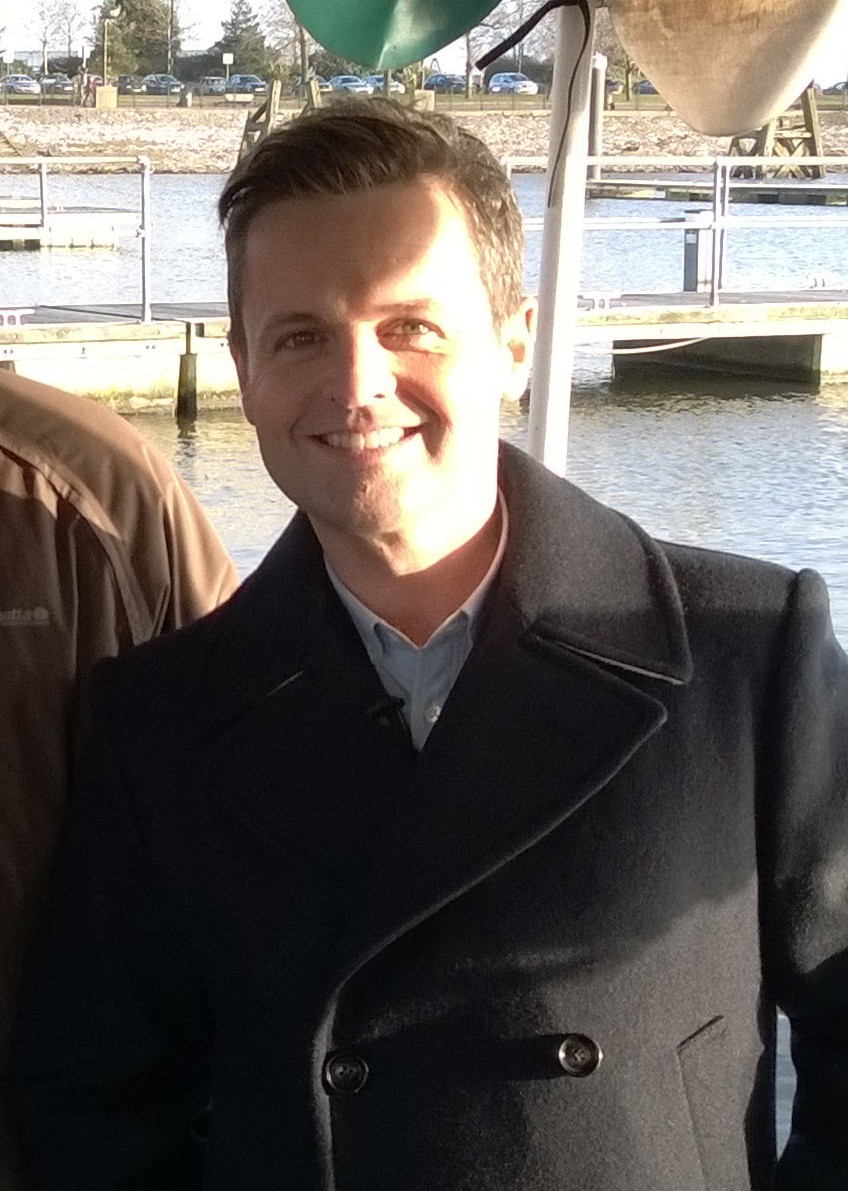
Declan Donnelly

Following the success of America's Got Talent: The Champions in early 2019, Simon Cowell opted to create a similar spin-off competition for Britain's Got Talent, which, along with the same subtitle, would operate under the same format. Production was green-lighted by the broadcaster ITV, with the contest taking place between July and August of the same year, and using the same presenters and panel of judges as the regular show. Much like the American spin-off, the episodes were pre-recorded – filming of the spin-off took place during the contest's operation, with production staff editing the finalised footage for full broadcast over a weekly basis, towards the end of the Summer TV schedule that year.

On September 1st 2026, it was confirmed that the Champions series would return to mark the main programme's 20th anniversary in Autumn 2027.

== Episodes ==
=== Series overview ===
Season	Episodes	Originally released		Average viewers (millions)
Season	Episodes	First released	Last released	Average viewers (millions)
1	6	August 31, 2019	October 5, 2019	5.03

== Ratings ==
=== Series 1 (2019) ===
Episode	Title	Air date	Total viewers (millions) ^{a}	ITV weekly rank
1	Preliminary 1	31 August	7.20	1
2	Preliminary 2	7 September	6.23	5
3	Preliminary 3	14 September	5.89	8
4	Preliminary 4	21 September	5.07	13
5	Preliminary 5	28 September	5.21	14
6	Final	5 October	5.63	13
