= Delhi Chamber Choir =

Western Classical choir from New Delhi, India

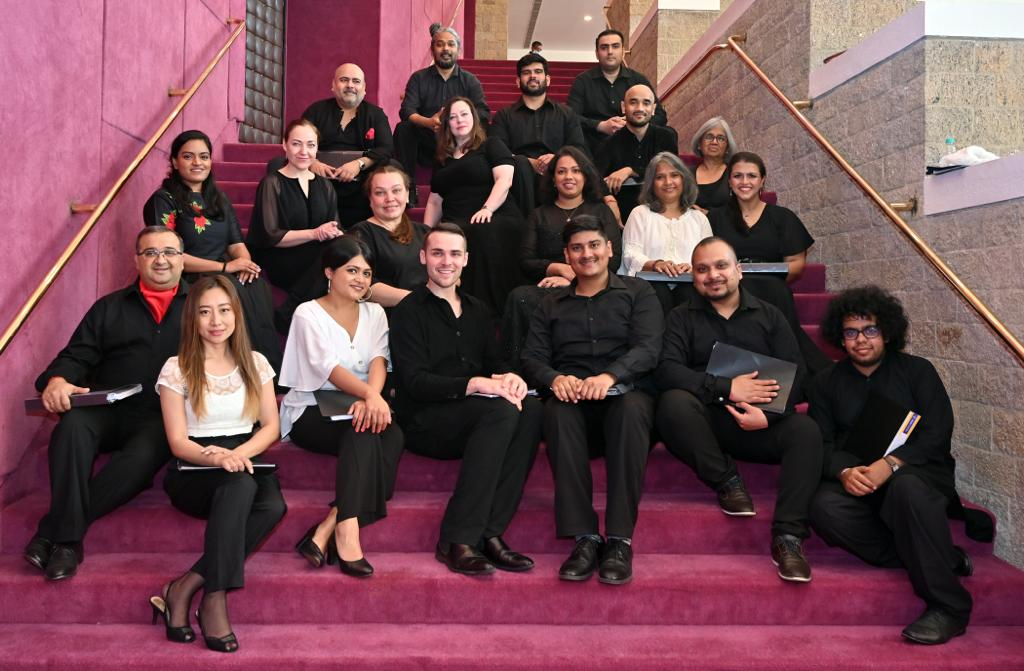
Delhi Chamber Choir at the National Centre for Performing Arts, Mumbai in February, 2023

The Delhi Chamber Choir (DCC) is a mixed vocal ensemble based in Delhi, India, and is among many choirs in India performing Western classical music. The choir’s repertoire includes a wide range of music from renaissance and baroque to modern and contemporary choral compositions.

== History ==
The Delhi Chamber Choir was founded in 2007 by Gabriella Boda-Rechner, a Hungarian expat and professional choirmaster, who had been residing in Delhi. Her leadership influenced the choir's development and artistic output, resulting in performances that introduced Delhi’s audience to choral chamber music.

In April 2012, Nadezda Valeyrevna Balyan, a Russian choir conductor and music educator who had moved to India, took over as the conductor. An alumnus of the Moscow State University of Art and Culture, Nadezda introduced the choir to Russian Orthodox music by Rachmaninoff and Bortniansky.

After a brief hiatus, during which many of the expat choristers either returned to their home countries or were transferred to other postings, Delhi Chamber Choir witnessed a new generation of Indian singers, mostly under the age of 25. The choir returned to the stage in October 2019 at Delhi’s Akshara Theatre, performing a repertoire that spanned from Victoria and Palestrina to Tavener and Poulenc.

Nadezda continues to conduct Delhi Chamber Choir.

== Performances ==
In December 2007, the choir performed choral works by Debussy and Kodaly at the India International Centre. Later that month, DCC collaborated with the Neemrana Music Foundation at the Bahai House of Worship.

In March 2008, the choir returned to the Bahai House of Worship, also known as the Lotus Temple, to perform sacred works by J.S. Bach, Mozart, William Byrd, and Gabriel Fauré. Later in November, the Delhi Chamber Choir performed Mozart's 'Requiem' and Gounod's 'Gallia' alongside the Neemrana Music Foundation. Organized by Alliance Francaise, New Delhi, and directed by French conductor Yves Parmentier, the concert was held at the Kamani Auditorium.

In May 2010, Delhi Chamber Choir performed sacred compositions by Mozart, Beethoven, Bach, and Pergolesi at the Cathedral Church of Redemption. The choir performed another programme of sacred music in April 2012 at Teen Murti Bhawan, conducted by Nadezda Balyan.

After a brief hiatus, Delhi Chamber Choir returned to the stage in October 2019 at Akshara Theatre. In February 2020, Delhi Chamber Choir participated in the Latvian-Indian Choral Festival, organised by the Latvian Embassy in India. The choir performed works by contemporary composers like Eric Whitacre, Ola Gjeilo, Arvo Pärt, Kevin Fox, Eriks Ešenvalds, and Laura Jekabsone. The performance was led by Latvian conductor, Jānis Ozols, and featured singers from other choirs of Delhi.

In April 2020, the choir was scheduled to perform a concert featuring Italian organist and conductor Paolo Devito, with soloists soprano, Tatiana Smantser, and mezzo-soprano, Larissa Rai. The event was cancelled due to the COVID-19 pandemic, reflecting the global impact of the crisis on live performances.

The choir returned to the stage in February 2023 with a performance of Karl Jenkins' 'Requiem' at the National Centre for Performing Arts in Mumbai. This concert, held in collaboration with the Symphony Orchestra of India and choirs from Bangalore and Mumbai, was conducted by Marat Bisengaliev.

April 2023 saw the debut of Project 8, a short-lived ensemble comprising versatile vocalists. This vocal octet specialized in performing Renaissance, Baroque, Modern, and Jazz a capella repertoire.

== Education ==
Delhi Chamber Choir conducts workshops and masterclasses aimed at nurturing young talent and fostering a deeper understanding of choral music. These educational initiatives are designed to enhance vocal techniques, musicality, and overall performance skills, contributing to the growth of choral music in India.

Two of their members, Gaurav Vohra and Vaibhavi Singh, were accepted at Saint Petersburg Conservatory, becoming the first Indians to attend the institution. Additionally, the choir achieved a Distinction grade in the ABRSM Advanced Choral Singing examination.
