= India's Got Talent =

Indian TV show

- Genre: Reality; Talent show
- Created by: Simon Cowell
- Written by: Ajay Bawa; Gaurav Bhalla; Manoj Muntashir; Gunjan Joshi; Pratyush Prakash
- Directed by: Arun Sheshkumar; Huzefa Qaiser
- Creative directors: Aradhana Bhola; Chitra Langeh
- Presented by: Ayushmann Khurrana; Nikhil Chinapa; Meiyang Chang; Gautam Rode; Manish Paul; Cyrus Sahukar; Mantra; VJ Andy; Bharti Singh; Nakuul Mehta; Sidharth Shukla; Rithvik Dhanjani; Arjun Bijlani; Haarsh Limbachiyaa
- Judges: Shekhar Kapur; Sonali Bendre; Kirron Kher; Sajid Khan; Dharmendra; Farah Khan; Karan Johar; Malaika Arora Khan; Manoj Muntashir; Shilpa Shetty Kundra; Badshah; Shaan; Navjot Singh Sidhu
- Narrated by: Vijay Vikram Singh
- Country of origin: India
- Original language: Hindi
- No. of seasons: 11
- No. of episodes: 193

Production
- Executive producer: Aradhana Bhola
- Producers: Chitra Langeh; Akash Tiwari; N.B. Rajkumar Patra
- Editor: Nitin Pant
- Camera setup: Multi-camera
- Running time: 60-105 minutes
- Production companies: Big Synergy (Season 1–2); Fremantle India; Syco Entertainment

Original release
- Network: Colors TV
- Release: 27 June 2009 – 29 December 2018
- Network: Sony Entertainment Television
- Release: 15 January 2022 – present

India's Got Talent is a televised Indian Hindi talent show series and is part of the Got Talent franchise. The program is produced and distributed by Fremantle and Syco Entertainment. The show aired on Colors TV until season 8. Since season 9 the show is airing on Sony Entertainment Television.

== Format ==
=== Auditions ===
Each year's competition begins with a set of audition stages, the first being the "Producers' Auditions", is conducted across various cities in the India. This stage is open to all forms of acts and judged by an independent group, and thus determines who will take part in the next stage of auditions titled "Judges' Auditions". These are held in Mumbai in studios.

- Film City, Mumbai (season 1–8)
- Yash Raj Studios, Mumbai (season 9)
- Filmistan Studio, Goregaon, Mumbai (season 10-)

Each participant reaching this stage of auditions is held offstage from the main performing area in a waiting room, and given a number that denotes when they will perform. Upon being called before the judges, the participant is given 2–3 minutes to demonstrate their act, with a live audience present for all performances. Each judge is given a buzzer, and may use it during a performance if they are unimpressed, dislike what is being performed, or feel the act is a waste of their time. If a participant is buzzed by all judges, their performance is automatically over. At the end of a performance, the judges give constructive criticism and feedback about what they saw, whereupon they are each given a vote. A participant requires a majority vote approving their performance to proceed to the next stage, otherwise they are eliminated from the program at that stage. Many acts that move on may be cut or forfeit their place, due to the limited slots available for the next stage. Filming for each season begins when the Judges' Auditions are taking place, with the show's host standing in the wings of each venue's stage to interview, and give personal commentary on a participant's performance.

From ninth season onwards, acts who did not attend live auditions could instead submit a taped audition online via SonyLIV.

In the fifth season, the show added a new format to the auditions in the form of the "Golden Buzzer", which began to make appearances within the Got Talent franchise, since it was first introduced on Das Supertalent. During auditions, each judge is allowed to use the Golden Buzzer to send an act automatically into the semi-finals, regardless of the opinion of the other judges. Number of golden buzzer usage per judge varies each season, mostly two. In season 8, the host duo were allowed to use the golden buzzer separately and in season 10 the host could press it again.

=== Second Round ===
After auditions are completed, the judges conduct a special session (or second "audition" round) to determine which participants will secure a place in the semi-finals of the competition, though the format for this stage has been change several times over the course of the program's history.

Between the first and fifth season, the format was changed to match that used in Britain's Got Talent. Participants who made it through the preliminary auditions had their audition footage reviewed by the judges, who set each one into a specific group, and were not required to perform again (unless the judges requested this). Acts which they liked would be allocated spaces in the semi/quarter finals, with the remainder eliminated from that season's competition. All acts were brought back to learn of the results of the judges' deliberations.

Between sixth and eight season, the format was changed and it was different from any Got Talent franchise. Second round was divided into two parts- 'Hunar War' and 'Spotlight'. The participants were divided into groups according to genre of their acts and judges can choose on the basis of second performance whether they will advance or not.

From season nine onwards, the format was again matched to as of Britain's Got Talent and America's Got Talent.

=== Semi-finals and Quarter-finals ===
Between first and third season, participants who pass their auditions and secure a place in the live quarter-finals of the competitions, are divided into groups and compete against each other to secure a place within the live final of the competition. Live episodes of the competition are held within a set venue (the location has varied). The results were announced the next day of the performance episode.

From season four onwards, pre-recorded and edited episodes were telecast where they compete in the semi-final. The results were either announced on the next semi final or on the pre-finale with one performer advancing from public votes and one or two performers advancing from judges' choice. The judges can still use their buzzers to terminate an act.

From season nine onwards when the telecasting network was changed from Colors to SET, the show's format after auditions was reimagined and reworked on. Only 14 contestants, including golden buzzer acts advance to quarter-finals^{1} to compete in a weekly competition. All the contestants from in a quarter-final. The results of a quarter-final are announced in the next quarter-final after all the performances. The bottom-most contestants from public votes and judge's scores (not revealed) are called upon, and judges can save two of them (number may vary). The final Top-7 move on to the grand-finale which is also pre-recorded.

India's Got Talent becomes the first show in the Got Talent franchise to introduce a completely different format, including the use of the Golden Buzzer in the quarter-finals to recognise and celebrate exceptional acts.

== Judges and hosts ==
Host
Guest Host
Judge
Guest Judge

Judge Name	Season										
Judge Name	1 2009	2 2010	3 2011	4 2012	5 2014	6 2015	7 2016	8 2018	9 2022	10 2023	11 2025
Kirron Kher^{3} ^{6}	●	●	●	●	●	●	●	●	●	●	
Shekhar Kapur	●										
Sonali Bendre	●	●	●								
Sajid Khan		●									
Dharmendra			●								
Karan Johar				●	●	●	●	●			
Malaika Arora^{4}				●	●	●	●	●	●		●
Farah Khan				●						●	
Manoj Muntashir									●		
Badshah									●	●	
Shilpa Shetty^{5}									●	●	
Anupam Kher										●	
Navjot Singh Sidhu											●
Shaan											●

Season	Host	
Season	1	2
1	Ayushmann Khurrana	Nikhil Chinapa
2	Ayushmann Khurrana	Nikhil Chinapa
3	Gautam Rode	Meiyang Chang
4	Manish Paul	Cyrus Sahukar
5	Bharti Singh	Mantra^{1}
6	Bharti Singh	Nakuul Mehta^{2}
7	Bharti Singh	Sidharth Shukla
8	Bharti Singh	Rithvik Dhanjani
9	Arjun Bijlani	—N/a
10	Arjun Bijlani	—N/a
11	Haarsh Limbachiyaa	—N/a

Notes:

1. VJ Andy replaced Mantra midway for film shooting.
2. Sidharth Shukla replaced Nakuul Mehta midway.
3. Kirron Kher was only absent during episodes of Stunt Yard in season 9.
4. Farah Khan replaced Malaika Arora midway.
5. Malaika Arora served as guest judge in absence of Shilpa Shetty.
6. Kirron Kher was absent on the World Record Episode and was not replaced by anyone.

== Series overview ==
Season	Start	Finish	Winner's Prize	Network	No. of Episodes	Judges				Winner	Runner-up	Third place
1	27 June 2009	22 August 2009	₹50,00,000	Colors TV	25	Kirron Kher	Sonali Bendre	Shekhar Kapur	—N/a	Prince Dance Group	Lokmanya Tilak Group	Piyush Rajani and the Fine Tuners
2	30 July 2010	1 October 2010	₹50,00,000	Colors TV	19	Kirron Kher	Sonali Bendre	Sajid Khan	—N/a	Shillong Chamber Choir	Teji Toko	Bir Khalsa
3	30 July 2011	25 September 2011	₹50,00,000	Colors TV	18	Kirron Kher	Sonali Bendre	Dharmendra	—N/a	SNV Group	—N/a	
4	22 September 2012	24 November 2012	₹50,00,000	Colors TV	17	Kirron Kher	Karan Johar	Malaika Arora Farah Khan	—N/a	Sumanth & Sonali (Bad Salsa)	Deepraj Rai Tanya & Mukesh (Note: Although both acts were runners-up, neither were defined in terms of 2nd and 3rd place during the broadcast of the final's result for this season.)	
5	11 January 2014	8 March 2014	₹50,00,000	Colors TV	17	Kirron Kher	Karan Johar	Malaika Arora	—N/a	Raagini Makkhar & Naadyog Academy	—N/a	
6	18 April 2015	27 June 2015	₹50,00,000	Colors TV	21	Kirron Kher	Karan Johar	Malaika Arora	—N/a	Manik Paul	—N/a	
7	30 April 2016	9 July 2016	₹50,00,000	Colors TV	21	Kirron Kher	Karan Johar	Malaika Arora	—N/a	Suleiman	—N/a	
8	20 October 2018	29 December 2018	₹25,00,000	Colors TV	21	Kirron Kher	Karan Johar	Malaika Arora	—N/a	Javed Khan	Live 100 Experience	—N/a
9	15 January 2022	17 April 2022	₹20,00,000	Sony Entertainment Television	28	Kirron Kher	Shilpa Shetty	Badshah	Manoj Muntashir	Divyansh and Manuraj	Ishita Vishwakarma	Bomb Fire Crew
10	29 July 2023	5 November 2023	₹20,00,000	Sony Entertainment Television	30	Kirron Kher	Shilpa Shetty	Badshah	—N/a	Abujmarh Mallakhamb & Sports Academy	Raaga Fusion	Golden Girls
11	4 October 2025	4 January 2026	₹10,00,000	Sony Entertainment Television	27	Navjot Singh Sidhu	Shaan	Malaika Arora	—N/a	The Amazing Apsaras	Sound of Souls x Gaurash	Hidden Fire Crew

=== Season 1 (2009) ===
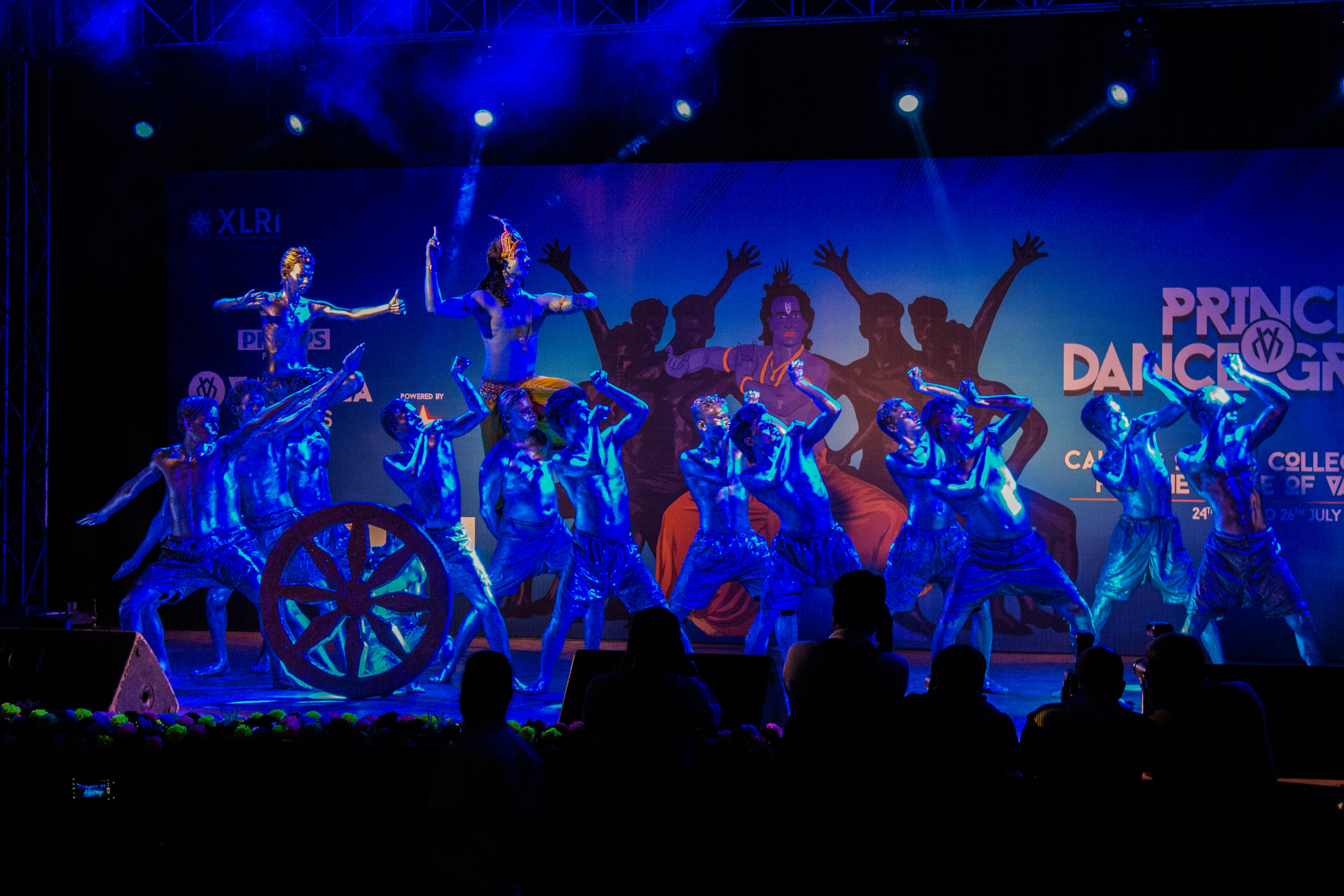
Prince Dance Group, season 1 winner

Season 1 was hosted by Nikhil Chinapa and Ayushmann Khurrana and the special segment called "India's Got More Talent" was hosted by Roshni Chopra. The show was judged by Sonali Bendre, Kirron Kher and Shekhar Kapur.

The winning act of the first season was the Prince Dance Group from Berhampur, Orissa. The group of 56 people performed a dance inspired by the Lord Vishnu's Dashavatara.

=== Season 2 (2010) ===
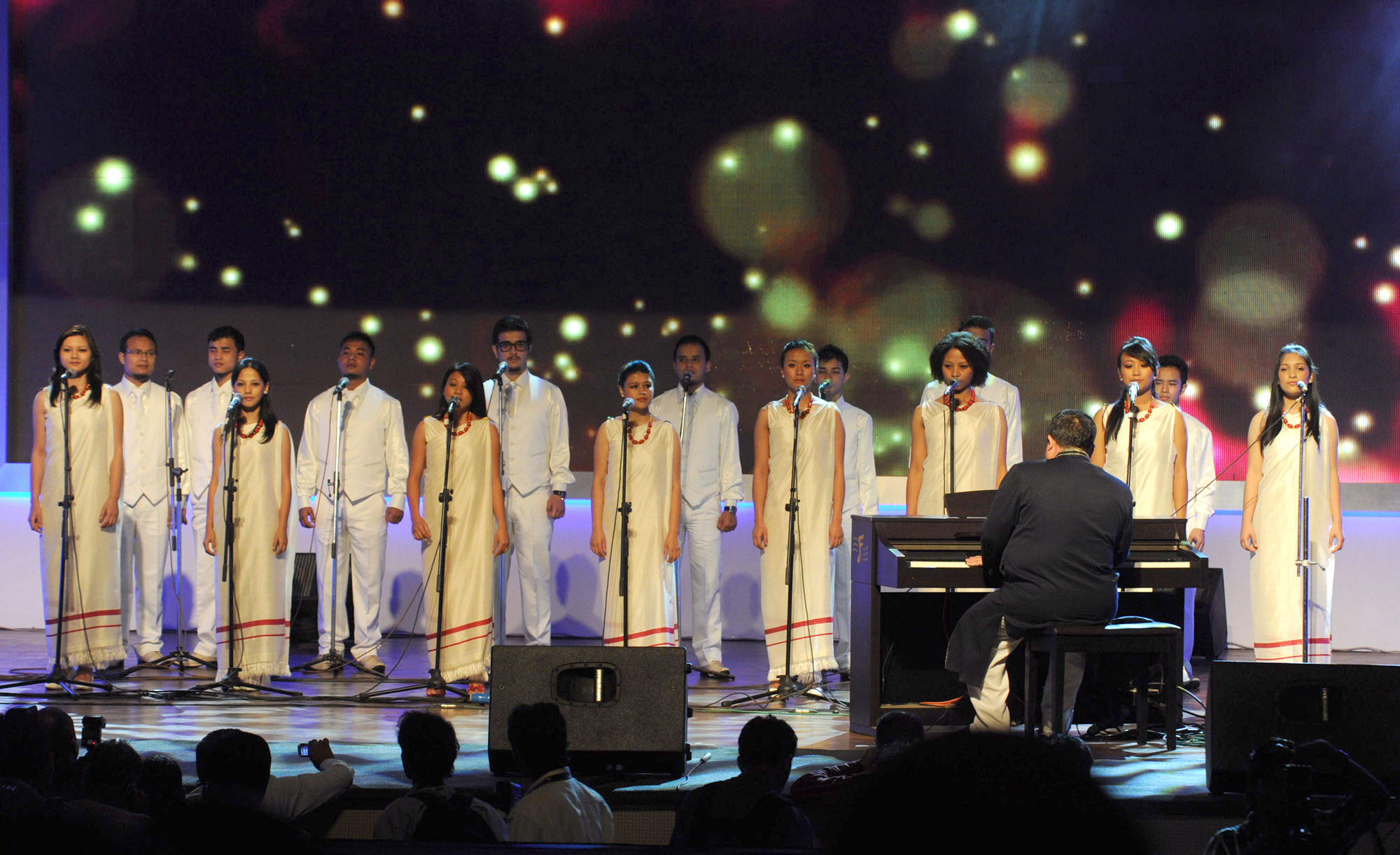
Shillong Chamber Choir, season 2 winner

Season 2 was hosted by the same duo, Nikhil Chinapa and Ayushmann Khurrana, as they were selected through voting by the judges and the viewers.

Sonali Bendre and Kirron Kher continued their roles as judges, however Shekher Kapur was replaced by Sajid Khan.

The winners of season 2 were the Shillong Chamber Choir, led by Neil Nongkynrih from Shillong, Meghalaya.

=== Season 3 (2011) ===
Season 3 was hosted by singer Meiyang Chang and actor-model Gautam Rode. The judges of this season were Sonali Bendre, Kirron Kher and Dharmendra.

The second runner-up of season 2, SNV Group (named after members Suresh Mukund and Vernon Monteiro), emerged as the winner of the season.

=== Season 4 (2012) ===
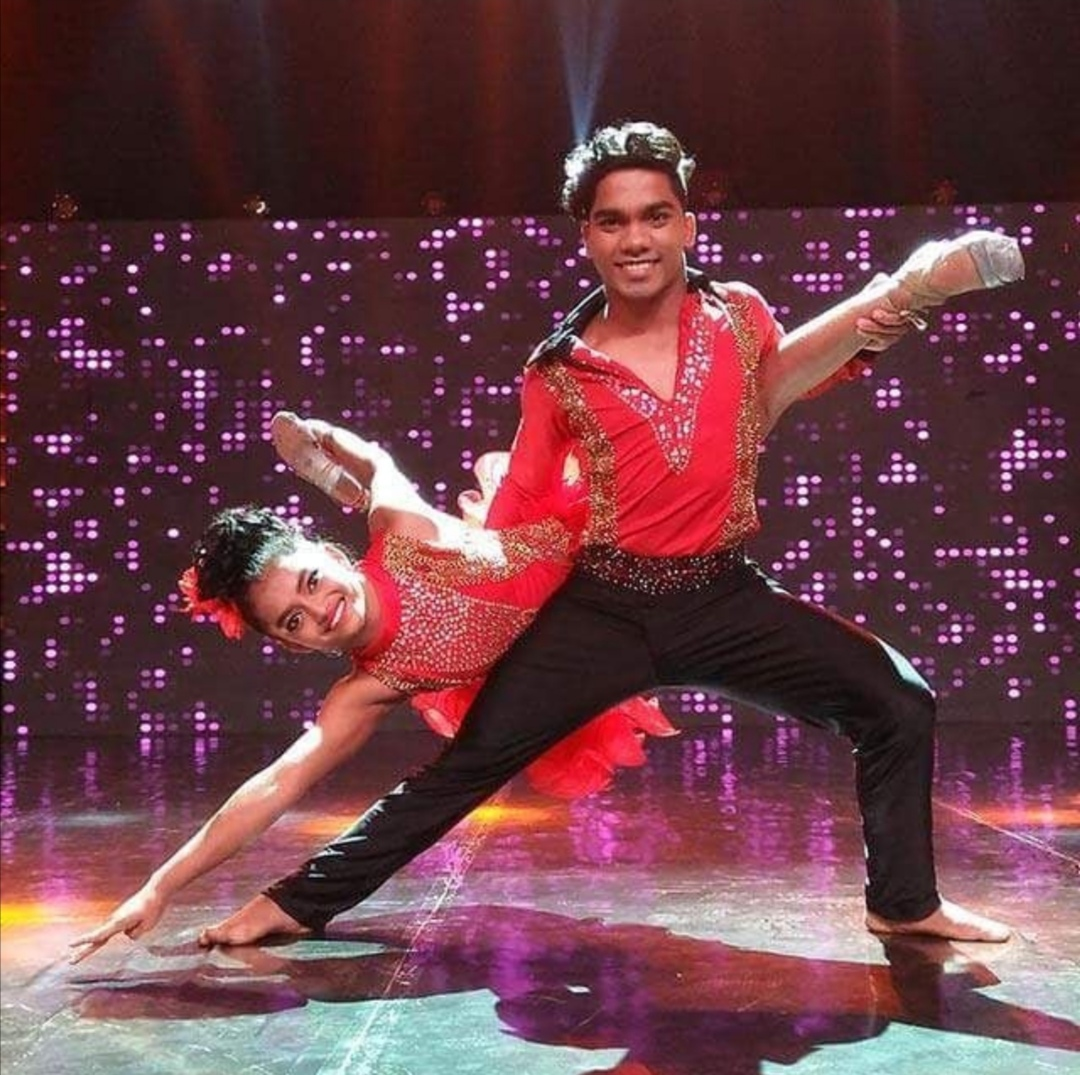
Bad Salsa, season 4 winner

Season 4 was hosted by Manish Paul and Cyrus Sahukar. Kirron Kher, Malaika Arora Khan, and Karan Johar were judges. Farah Khan later replaced Malaika Arora Khan.

Dancers Sonali Majumdar and Maraju Sumanth, who formed the duo Bad Salsa from Kolkata's Bivash Dance Academy, were crowned winners of the fourth season.

=== Season 5 (2014) ===
Season 5 was hosted by Mantra and Bharti Singh. Later, Mantra was replaced by VJ Andy. Malaika Arora Khan, Kirron Kher and Karan Johar reprised their roles as judges. Ragini Makkhar's Naadyog Academy won the season. Indore, Madhya Pradesh-based Ragini Makkhar's Naadyog Academy is a 25-year-old dance institution which consists of 360 students.

=== Season 6 (2015) ===
Season 6 was hosted by Bharti Singh, Nakuul Mehta and Sidharth Shukla. Malaika Arora Khan, Kirron Kher and Karan Johar reprised their roles as judges. Aerial dancer Manik Paul won the season winning a cash prize of ₹50,00,000.

=== Season 7 (2016) ===
Season 7 was hosted by Bharti Singh and Sidharth Shukla. Malaika Arora Khan, Kirron Kher and Karan Johar reprised their roles as judges. Flautist Suleiman, a 13-year-old flute player from Amritsar, Punjab won the season, and dance duo Papai and Antara bagged the runner-up positions.

=== Season 8 (2018) ===
Season 8 was hosted by Bharti Singh and Rithvik Dhanjani. Malaika Arora Khan, Kirron Kher and Karan Johar reprised their roles as judges. 27-year-old close-up magician Javed Khan had a tie with Live 100 Experience Band in the final stage, but with more votes coming his way, he was awarded the trophy and prize money of Rs 25 lakh.

=== Season 9 (2022) ===
Season 9 was hosted by Arjun Bijlani. Kirron Kher continue serving as judge for the ninth season along with Shilpa Shetty Kundra, Baadshah and Manoj Muntashir. The format of the show was changed. Flute & beat box duo Divyansh & Manuraj won the season, whereas Ishita Vishwakarma and Bomb Fire Crew finished as runner-up and 2nd runner-up, respectively.

=== Season 10 (2023) ===
Auditions were held in various cities in May and June 2023.

Season 10 aired from 29 July 2023. It was again hosted by Arjun Bijlani and Kirron Kher, Badshah and Shilpa Shetty returned as judges. According to some reports Manoj Muntashir was dropped owing to film Adipurush's dialogues controversy but the makers said, "Given Kirron Kher's health issues last season, they had four judges as a safety option. However, this time it's just the trio that will take on the panel."

Abujmarh Mallakhamb and Sports Academy emerged as the winner of this season winning ₹ 20,00,000. Raaga Fusion and Golden Girls as 1st and 2nd runners-up respectively winning ₹ 5,00,000 each.

=== Season 11 (2025) ===
Auditions were held in various cities in July and August 2025.

Season 11 started airing from 4 October 2025. It was again hosted by Haarsh Limbachiyaa with Navjot Singh Sidhu, Malaika Arora and Shaan as judges. Given Kirron Kher's health issues, she was dropped from the judging panel after judging the show since its inception.

== Spin-offs ==
=== India's Got More Talent ===
India's Got More Talent was a companion show broadcast on channel Colors, after the main India's Got Talent broadcast for season one. It featured behind-the-scenes footage of India's Got Talent and showed the emotional responses of the contestants after the judges comment on their performances. It was presented by Roshni Chopra.

== Awards and nominations ==
Year	Group	Award	Nominee	Result
2009	Indian Telly Awards	Best Reality Show	India's Got Talent	Nominated
2012	Indian Telly Awards	Best Judge on a TV Show	Kirron Kher	Won
2012	Indian Telly Awards	Best Judge on a TV Show	Sonali Bendre	Won
2012	Indian Telly Awards	Best Judge on a TV Show	Dharmendra	Won
2012	Indian Telly Awards	Best Direction (Non-Fiction)	Arun Sheshkumar	Nominated
2012	Indian Telly Awards	Best Reality Show	India's Got Talent	Nominated
2013	Indian Telly Awards	Best Reality Show	India's Got Talent	Nominated
2014	Indian Telly Awards	Best Reality Show	India's Got Talent	Nominated
2015	Indian Telly Awards	Best Reality Show	India's Got Talent	Nominated
2015	Asian Viewers Television Awards	Best Reality Show	India's Got Talent	Nominated
2016	BIG Star Entertainment Awards	Most Entertaining Jury/ Host (TV) - Non Fiction	Malaika Arora	Nominated
2016	Indian Television Academy Awards	Best Direction	India's Got Talent	Won
2019	Indian Telly Awards	Best Weekender Show	India's Got Talent	Nominated
2023	Indian Television Academy Awards	Best Reality Show (Dance/Music)	India's Got Talent	Nominated
2023	Indian Television Academy Awards	Best Anchor Reality Show (Dance/Music)	Arjun Bijlani	Won
