= Prince Dance Group =

Dance Troupe based in Odisha, India

Prince Dance Group is a dance troupe based in Berhampur, Odisha, India which won a reality show India's Got Talent on Colors TV. The group's members are from a remote part of India, and most of them are from disadvantaged sections of different parts of Ganjam district. Two of them are physically disabled.
