= India's Got Talent season 4 =

India's Got Talent
- Season 4
- Hosted by: Manish Paul; Cyrus Sahukar
- Judges: Kirron Kher; Karan Johar; Malaika Arora (auditions); Farah Khan (finals)
- Winner: Biwash Academy of Dance
- Runners-up: Deepraj Rai; Tanya & Mukesh
- No. of episodes: 17

Release
- Original network: Colors TV
- Original release: 22 September – 24 November 2012

Season chronology
- ← Previous; Season 3 Next → Season 5

The fourth season of Indian talent competition programme India's Got Talent was broadcast on Colors TV, from 22 September to 24 November 2012.

The fourth season was won by Biwash Academy of Dance winning a cash prize of Rs. 50,00,000.

== Season overview ==
This year, the show was hosted by Manish Paul & Cyrus Sahukar & judged by veteran Kirron Kher, Karan Johar and Malaika Arora Khan during the auditions but later in the Semi-Finals Malaika was replaced by Farah Khan for rest of the season.

Of the participants that took part, only forty made it past this stage and into the six semi-finals, with 5,6 or 7 appearing in each one, and thirteen of these acts making it into the live final; the wildcard act chosen by the judges was dance group Ocean Kids, after he lost out in the Judges' vote in the first semi-final. The following below lists the results of each participant's overall performance in this series:

Winner | Runner-up | Third place | Finalist
Semi-finalist | Judges' Wildcard Finalist

Participant	Act	Semi-final	Result
Ocean Kids	Dance Act	1	Finalist
Toshan Singh	Singing	1	Finalist
Air Group	Dance Act	1	Eliminated
Kamal Kishore	Actor	1	Eliminated
Tanya & Mukesh	Aerial Dance Act	1	Third Place
Sajiterious Group	Archery Act	1	Eliminated
Immortals Dance Group	Dance Act	1	Eliminated
Shiraz Irani	Dance Act	2	Finalist
Silhouette Squad	Dance Act	2	Finalist
Ila & Ibra Khalid	Singing Duo	2	Eliminated
Reshma Nut	Dance Trio	2	Eliminated
S.K. Sanu	Musical Theatre Group	2	Eliminated
Atul Patil	Vocal Harmony Group	2	Eliminated
Chanchal Bharti	Quwali Act	3	Finalist
Nitish Bharti	Sand Art	3	Finalist
Anshuman Nandi	Drum Act	3	Eliminated
Shamksh Victory A&F Group	Dance Act	3	Eliminated
Om Saiba Group	Dance Act	3	Eliminated
Acrobatic Boys	Acrobatics Act	4	Finalist
Raptilez	Dance Act	4	Eliminated
Biwash Academy of Dance	Dance Duo	4	Winner
Ajit Singh Tanwar	Singer & Guitarist	4	Eliminated
Micheal Hoshiyar Singh	Dancer	4	Eliminated
Bijocks	Singing Group	4	Eliminated
Amardeep Singh Nath	Keytar Player	5	Eliminated
Diplav Cultural Dance Group	Gymnastic Dance Duo	5	Finalist
Deepraj Rai	Dancer	5	Runner-up
Jai Hanuman Kala Manch	Rapper	5	Eliminated
Skeleton Dance Group	Drummer & DJ	5	Eliminated
Nishan-e-Khalsa	Dance Troupe	5	Eliminated
Funtoosh	Cabaret Duet	5	Eliminated
Raini Patel	Singer	2	Eliminated
Talent Scan Group	Impressionist	1	Finalist
Jumme Khan Bhapang Group	Breakdancer	4	Eliminated
Abinash Kishor	Dance Troupe	3	Eliminated
Natya Nector	Opera Duo	1	Eliminated
Margam Dance Academy	Singer & Guitarist	3	Finalist

=== Semi-finals summary ===
Buzzed | Judges' Vote | Won the Public Vote
Won the Judges' Vote | Lost the Judges' Vote | Eliminated

==== Semi-final 1 (21 October) ====
- Special Guest- Preity Zinta

Semi-Finalist	Order	Buzzes and Judges' votes			Result
Semi-Finalist	Order	Kirron	Karan	Farah	Result
Ocean Kids	1				Eliminated (Lost Judges' Vote)
Toshan Singh Nnagbet	2				Advanced (Won Public Vote)
Air Group	3				Eliminated
Kamal Kishore	4				Eliminated
Tanya and Mukesh	5				Advanced (Won Judges' Vote)
Sajiterious Group	6				Eliminated
Immortals Dance Group	7				Eliminated

==== Semi-final 2 (27 October) ====
- Special Guest- Sonakshi Sinha

Semi-Finalist	Order	Buzzes and Judges' votes			Result
Semi-Finalist	Order	Kirron	Karan	Farah	Result
Shiraz Irani	1				Advanced (Won Judges' Vote)
Silhouette Squad	2				Advanced (Won Public Vote)
Ila & Ibra Khalid	3				Eliminated
Reshma Nut	4				Eliminated (Lost Judges' Vote)
S.K. Sanu	5				Eliminated
Atul Patil	6				Eliminated

==== Semi-final 3 (28 October) ====
- Special Guest- Yuvraj Singh

Semi-Finalist	Order	Buzzes and Judges' votes			Result
Semi-Finalist	Order	Kirron	Karan	Farah	Result
Chanchal Bharti	1				Advanced (Won Judges' Vote)
Nitish Bharti	2				Advanced (Won Public Vote)
Anshuman Nandi	3				Eliminated (Lost Judges' Vote)
Shamksh Victory A&F Group	4				Eliminated
Om Saiba Group	5				Eliminated

==== Semi-final 4 (3 November) ====
Semi-Finalist	Order	Buzzes and Judges' votes			Result
Semi-Finalist	Order	Kirron	Karan	Farah	Result
Acrobatic Boys	1				Advanced (Won Judges' Vote)
Raptilez	2				Eliminated
Biwash Academy of Dance	3				Advanced (Won Public Vote)
Ajit Singh Tanwar	4				Eliminated (Lost Judge' Vote)
Micheal Hoshiyar Singh	5				Eliminated
Bijocks	6				Eliminated

==== Semi-final 5 (4 November) ====
Semi-Finalist	Order	Buzzes and Judges' votes			Result
Semi-Finalist	Order	Kirron	Karan	Farah	Result
Amardeep Singh Nath	1				Eliminated
Diplav Cultural Dance Group	2				Advanced (Won Public Vote)
Deepraj Rai	3				Advanced (Won Judges' Vote)
Jai Hanuman Kala Manch	4				Eliminated
Skeleton Dance Group	5				Eliminated
Nishan-e-Khalsa	6				Eliminated
Funtoosh	7				Eliminated (Lost Judges' Vote)

==== Semi-final 6 (10 November) ====
Semi-Finalist	Order	Buzzes and Judges' votes			Result
Semi-Finalist	Order	Kirron	Karan	Farah	Result
Raini Patel	1				Eliminated
Talent Scan Group	2				Advanced (Won Judges' Vote)
Jumme Khan Bhapang Group	3				Eliminated
Abinash Kishor	4				Eliminated
Natya Nector	5				Eliminated (Lost Judges' Vote)
Margam Dance Academy	6				Advanced (Won Public Vote)

=== Grand Finale (18 November) ===
Prior to the finale, 2 pre-finals were also conducted, which gave the viewers last chance to cast their votes on 11 November and 17 November, 2012.

Winner | Runner-up

- Special Guests: Jab Tak Hai Jaan Cast (Shah Rukh Khan, Anushka Sharma, Katrina Kaif)
- Guest Judge: Malaika Arora Khan

Finalist	Finished
Acrobatic Boys	6th
Mukesh & Tanya	Runner-up (2nd—3rd)
Nitish Bharti	4th
Silhouette Squad	13th
Ocean Kids	7th
Margam Dance Academy	12th
Shiraz Irani	11th
Diplav Cultural Dance Group	8th
Biwash Academy of Dance	1st
Deepraj Rai	Runner-up (2nd—3rd)
Toshan Singh Nnagbet	5th
Chanchal Bharti	10th
Talent Scan Group	9th
