= Andy Kumar =

British TV personality

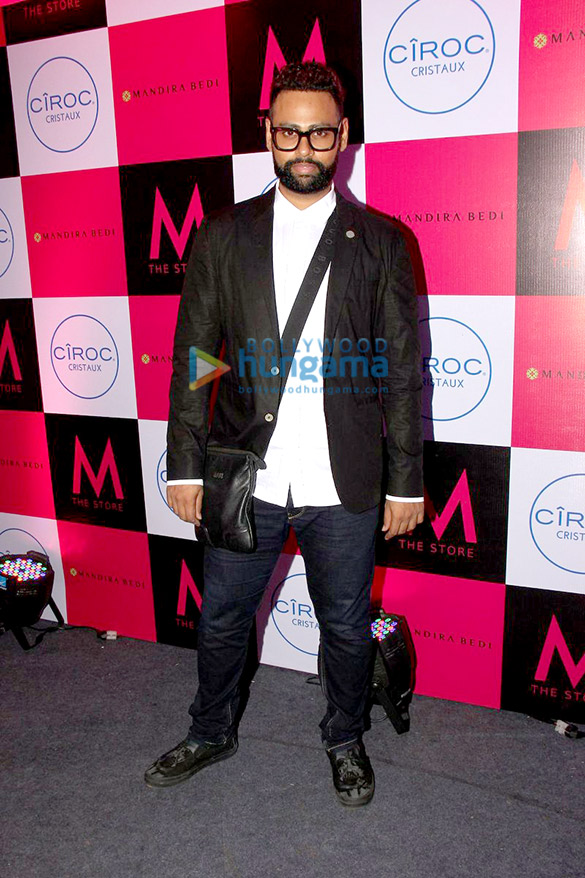
- Andy Kumar at the launch of Mandira Bedi’s ‘M The Store’
- Born: 31 May 1980 (age 46); Slough, Berkshire, England
- Occupations: Host, VJ

Andy Kumar, previously known as VJ Andy, is a British television personality based in India. He worked as Video Jockey for Channel V and has hosted several television programs including Dare 2 Date a dating reality show. He was a contestant in the seventh season of Bigg Boss, finishing fifth.

== Early life ==
Kumar was born Anand Vijay Kumar to an Indian Punjabi Hindu family in Slough, Berkshire, United Kingdom. He lives and works in Mumbai, India.

== Career ==
Kumar hosted Beauty and the Geek and What's With Indian Women on Fox Traveller India with comedian Sanjay Rajoura. In September 2013, he was a contestant on the Indian reality TV show Bigg Boss 7. In 2014 he was seen as a contestant on Jhalak Dikhhla Jaa 7. In October 2015, Andy was seen in the reality show I Can Do That.

== Personal life ==
Kumar has been reported in his country to be a member of the LGBT community.

== Television ==
Year	Name	Role	Notes	Ref(s)
2010	Get Gorgeous 6	Host		
2012	Dare 2 Date	Host		
2013	Welcome – Baazi Mehmaan Nawazi Ki	Contestant	Winner	
2013	Bigg Boss 7	Contestant	Evicted Day 101	
2014	Bani – Ishq Da Kalma	Guest		
2014	India's Got Talent	Host	Along with Bharti Singh	
2014	Jhalak Dikhhla Jaa 7	Contestant	Eliminated 16th Place	
2014	Bigg Boss 8	Guest	Along with Kamya Panjabi	
2014–2015	Box Cricket League 1	Host	Along with Kavita Kaushik	
2015	Killerr Karaoke Atka Toh Latkah	Contestant	Along with Sana Khan, Sara Khan, Mahek Chahal & Diandra Soares	
2015	Bigg Boss 9	Guest	Along with Sargun Mehta	
2015	I Can Do That	Contestant	Along with Gauahar Khan	
2016	Bigg Boss 10	Guest	Along with Tanisha Mukherji	

== Web ==
Year	Name	Role	Platform	Notes	Ref
2020	Masaba Masaba	Guest	Netflix	Season 01 Episode 04	

== Filmography ==
Year	Show	Role
2015	Ek Paheli Leela	Himself
2016	Kya Kool Hain Hum 3	Himself
2021	Radhe	Jazz
