= Victor Paranjoti =

Indian musician (1906–1967)

Victor Paranjoti (1906–1967) is known for his role in promoting choral music in India in the middle of the 20th century. He was also the founder president of the Association of the Business Communicators of India (ABCI).

== Western classical music in India ==
Was the founder and Conductor of the Bombay-based Paranjoti Choir. He has been described as "a person passionately involved with Western Classical music in India".

== Life ==
According to The Oxford Encyclopaedia of the Music of India Paranjoti was born in Bangalore in 1906 and died on February 1, 1967, in Mumbai and was an "(e)minent conductor and composer of Western music and a pioneer in synthesizing Western and Eastern musical forms." Born in a Tamil-speaking family, he got his early contact with melody through church-music.

In his earlier career, Paranjoti was the Chief, Publication Relations of the India-based ACC Cement company in the 1950s. After retiring, he joined The Times of India newspaper as its first National Business Editor. His other achievements include being the founder-President of the Indian Association of Industrial Editors. He is believed to have launched the Caltex and PTI-Reuters house journals in India.

On the All India Radio, he conducted programmes and was known for his excellence in spoken English. He created the Paranjoti Choir.

== Publications ==
According to WorldCat.org the publications of Victor Paranjoti include:

- Instrumental and orchestral music by Victor Paranjoti (Book, 1971)
- Dravidian dithyramb by Victor Paranjoti
- The Dravidian suite by Victor Paranjoti
- The Konkan suite by Victor Paranjoti
- Musical offerings for community singing by Victor Paranjoti (Book, 1971)
- Sacred choral and vocal music by Victor Paranjoti
- The Song of Radha that is no flute you play on, beloved; words, based on 2 Central Indian songs, and music; some notes about the composer by Victor Paranjoti (1961)
- On this and that, etc. by Victor Paranjoti (Book, 1958)

Another book has also been written on him, titled 'The legacy of Victor Paranjoti by Violet Paranjoti'.

== Paranjoti Academy Chorus ==
As of December 2018, the Paranjoti Academy Chorus, named in his memory, was still active. It is known to have sung in 22 languages, mostly Indian, including a 2011 performance in Goa of a Konkani song, Poili Santa arranged by Paranjoti's late founder Victor Paranjoti. It has been described as a "30-strong acapella choir"
