= List of songs recorded by Mamta Sharma =

Mamta Sharma is an Indian playback singer. She is known for the song "Munni Badnaam Hui" from Dabangg. The song was a chartbuster and fetched her several awards and nominations, including a Filmfare award for Best Playback Singer (Female). She also sings in Kannada, Telugu, Tamil, Bengali, Marathi and Bhojpuri.

== Hindi film songs ==
=== 2008 ===
Film	Song	Composer(s)	Writer(s)	Co-singer(s)
Meeting Se Meeting Tak	"Sun Kudiye"	Mithoon		Vishal Dadlani

=== 2010 ===
Film	Song	Composer(s)	Writer(s)	Co-singer(s)
Dabangg	"Munni Badnaam Hui"	Lalit Pandit	Lalit Pandit	Aishwarya Nigam
Dabangg	"Munni Badnaam Hui" (Remix Version)	Lalit Pandit	Lalit Pandit	Aishwarya Nigam

=== 2011 ===
Film	Song	Composer(s)	Writer(s)	Co-singer(s)
Yamla Pagla Deewana	"Chamki Jawaani"	Anu Malik		Master Saleem, Daler Mehndi
Yamla Pagla Deewana	"Tinku Jiya"	Anu Malik		Javed Ali
Bin Bulaye Baraati	"Dil Ka Achaar"	Anand Raj Anand		Dimple Balhotra
Miley Naa Miley Hum	"Katto Gilehri"	Sajid–Wajid		Daler Mehndi
Loot	"Jawani Ki Bank Loot Le"	Mika Singh		

=== 2012 ===
Film	Song	Composer(s)	Writer(s)	Co-singer(s)
Chaalis Chauraasi	"Badmast"	Lalit Pandit	Kashinath Kashyap	Daler Mehndi
Gali Gali Chor Hai	"Chhanno"	Anu Malik		
Gali Gali Chor Hai	"Chhanno" (Remix Version)	Anu Malik		
Housefull 2	"Anarkali Disco Chali"	Sajid–Wajid	Sameer	Sukhwinder Singh
Housefull 2	"Anarkali Disco Chali" (Remix Version)	Sajid–Wajid	Sameer	Sukhwinder Singh
Housefull 2	"Anarkali Disco Chali" (Hyper Mix)	Sajid–Wajid	Sameer	Sukhwinder Singh
Daal Mein Kuch Kaala Hai	"Mumbai Money Hai"	T-Series		
Rowdy Rathore	"Aa Re Pritam Pyaare"	Sajid–Wajid	Sameer	Sarosh Sami
Kamaal Dhamaal Malamaal	"Desi Mem"	Sajid–Wajid	Jalees Sherwani	Sarosh Sami
Bol Bachchan	"Bol Bol Bachchan"	Himesh Reshammiya	Farhad-Sajid	Amitabh Bachchan, Abhishek Bachchan, Ajay Devgan, Himesh Reshammiya, Vineet Singh
Bol Bachchan	"Bol Bol Bachchan" (Remix Version)	Himesh Reshammiya	Farhad-Sajid	Amitabh Bachchan, Abhishek Bachchan, Ajay Devgan, Himesh Reshammiya, Vineet Singh
Rakhtbeej	"Lattoo"	Satish-Ajay		Ajay Jaiswal
Chakradhaar	"Billori"	Anand Raj Anand	Sameer, Anand Raj Anand	
Son of Sardaar	"Tu Kamaal Di Kudi"	Himesh Reshammiya		Vineet Singh
Dhama Chaukdi	"Yaar Mood Jhand Kar Ke"			
Dabangg 2	"Fevicol Se"	Sajid–Wajid	Sajid–Wajid, Ashraf Ali	Wajid
Dabangg 2	"Fevicol Se" (Remix Version)	Sajid–Wajid	Sajid–Wajid, Ashraf Ali	Wajid
Dabangg 2	"Pandeyjee Seeti"	Sajid–Wajid	Jalees Sherwani	Wajid, Shreya Ghoshal
Dabangg 2	"Pandeyjee Seeti" (Remix Version)	Sajid–Wajid	Jalees Sherwani	Wajid, Shreya Ghoshal

=== 2013 ===
Film	Song	Composer(s)	Writer(s)	Co-singer(s)
Zila Ghaziabad	"Baap ka Maal"	Amjad Nadeem	Shabbir Ahmed	Sukhwinder Singh, Mika Singh
Himmatwala	"Dhoka Dhoka"	Sajid–Wajid	Sameer	Bappi Lahiri, Sunidhi Chauhan
Zanjeer	"Pinky"	Meet Bros Anjjan	Shabbir Ahmed	Meet Bros
Kismat Love Paisa Dilli	"Chandani Chowk"	Amjad Nadeem	Shabbir Ahmed	Sukhwinder Singh
Enemmy	"Katrina Ko Kareena Ko"	Bappa B. Lahiri		Bappi Lahiri
Besharam	"Tere Mohalle"	Lalit Pandit		Aishwarya Nigam
Besharam	"Tere Mohalle" (Remix Version)	Lalit Pandit		Aishwarya Nigam
Krrish 3	"Krrish Krrish"	Rajesh Roshan	Sameer	Rajesh Roshan, Anirudh Bhola
Gori Tere Pyaar Mein	"Tooh"	Vishal–Shekhar	Kumaar	Mika Singh, Shruti Pathak, Vishal Dadlani
Gori Tere Pyaar Mein	"Gori Tere Pyaar Mein"	Vishal–Shekhar	Kumaar	Shalmali Kholgade, Nitesh Kadam, Shruti Pathak, Sukhwinder Singh, Sanah Moidutty, Mika Singh, Shankar Mahadevan, Kamal Khan, Neeti Mohan
Bullett Raja	"Don't Touch My Body"	Sajid–Wajid	Sandeep Nath	
Issaq	"Enne Unne"	Sachin–Jigar		Keerthi Sagathia, Tarun Sagar, Papon

=== 2014 ===
Film	Song	Composer(s)	Writer(s)	Co-singer(s)
Singham Returns	"Aata Majhi Satakli"	Yo Yo Honey Singh	Yo Yo Honey Singh	Yo Yo Honey Singh, Nitu Choudhry
Spark	"Meri Jawani Sode Ki Botal"	Lalit Pandit		
Meinu Ek Ladki Chaahiye	"Gori Chitti Chamiya"	Ravi Pawar		
Raja Natwarlal	"Namak Paare"	Yuvan Shankar Raja	Irshad Kamil	Anupam Amod
Life Mein Twist Hai	"Balam Bambai"	Aryan R Jain		Aryan R Jain
Hum Hai Teen Khurafaat	"Ruh Se Ruh Ka Milan"			Sahil Solanski
City of Dreams	"Chipku Piya"			
Angry Young Man	"Bawri"			Farhaan Sabri, Amjad Khan

=== 2015 ===
Film	Song	Composer(s)	Writer(s)	Co-singer(s)
Jaatiwad	"Chicken Wali Hoon Main"	Shashikant-Sunny		
Mumbai Can Dance Saala	"Shake My Kamariya"	Bappi Lahiri		
Tevar	"Madamiya"	Sajid–Wajid	Kausar Munir	Mika Singh
Tevar	"Tevariffic (Mashup)"	Sajid–Wajid	Kausar Munir, Danish Sabri, Sajid	Arjun Kapoor, Wajid, Ritu Pathak, Shabab Sabri, Danish Sabri, Imran Khan, Shruti Haasan, Mika Singh, Shafqat Amanat Ali
Dolly Ki Doli	"Fashion Khatam"	Sajid–Wajid	Irfan Kamal	Wajid, Shabab Sabri
Ranbanka	"Ishaq Ka Garam Masala"	Sahil Rayyan	Arafat Mehmood	Desh Gaurav
Dirty Politics	"Ghaghara"	Sanjeev Darshan	Sameer	
Welcome Back	"20-20"	Anu Malik		Anu Malik, Shadaab
Bumper Draw	"Jod Jod"	Rahul Mishra	Irshad Khan	Altamash Faridi
Puli (D)	"Jingilia Jingilia"	Devi Sri Prasad		Javed Ali
Thoda Lutf Thoda Ishq	"Mera Pyaar Hai Maggi Jaisa"	Vikram Khajuria	Devshi Khanduri	

=== 2016 ===
Film	Song	Composer(s)	Writer(s)	Co-singer(s)
Dongari Ka Raja	"Choli Block Buster"	Asad Khan	Vijay Vijawatt	Shivangi Bhayana, Meet Bros
Sardaar Gabbar Singh (D)	"Khakhee"	Devi Sri Prasad	Kumaar	Devi Sri Prasad
Housefull 3	"Tang Uthake"	Sohail Sen	Sameer Sen, Farhad-Sajid, Mamta Sharma, Sanjeev Chaturvedi	Neeti Mohan, Mika Singh, Sohail Sen
Ek Kahani Julie Ki	"Fannari"	Deepak Agrawal	Kumar Juneja, Deepak Agrawal	Amit Gupta
Murari the Mad Gentleman	"Shaboo"	Biswajit Bhattacharjee (BIBO)	Krishan Bhardwaj	

=== 2017 ===
Film	Song	Composer(s)	Writer(s)	Co-singer(s)
Julie 2	"Mala Seenha"	Javed Mohsin	Shabbir Ahmed	Shabab Sabri, Danish Sabri
Babuji Ek Ticket Bambai	"Aankh Pe Chashma Daal Ke"	Nikhil Kamat	Kumaar	
JD	"Kamariya Pe Lattu"	Kumar Vijay	Ganesh Pandey	
Firangi	"Gulbadan"	Jatinder Shah	Dr. Devendra Kafir	Devender Pal Singh
The Dream Job	"DD Logi Ya Dollar"	Kashi Richard		Nakash Aziz
Kaun Mera Kaun Tera	"Kachaudi"	Shamsher Mehendi		

=== 2018 ===
Film	Song	Composer(s)	Writer(s)	Co-singer(s)
Jaane Kyun De Yaaron	"Ae Raja"	Satya, Manik, Afsal	Atique Allahbadi	Brijesh Shandil
Dassehra	"Joganiya"	Siddhant Madhav	Rajesh Mànthan	Chhaila Bihari, Siddhant Madhav
Chahat Ya Nasha	"Private Party"	Puneet Dixit		Saumya Upadhyay, Vaibhav Neekhra

=== 2019 ===
Film	Song	Composer(s)	Writer(s)	Co-singer(s)
Fraud Saiyaan	"Ladies Paan"	Sohail Sen	Kumaar	Shahid Mallya, Shadab Faridi
Operation Cobra	"Pallo Latke"	Sohail Sen	Mamta Sharma and Sameer Sen	Sohail Sen
Kissebaaz	"Babli"	Rohan Rohan	Rohan Gokha	Rohan Pradhan
Dabangg 3	"Munna Badnam Hua"	Sajid–Wajid	Danish-Sabri	Kamaal Khan, Badshah

=== 2020-2026 ===
Film	Song	Composer(s)	Writer(s)	Co-singer(s)
Dhamaal 4	Chatni (Phulori Bina Chatni Kaise Bani)	Aditya Dev, Neelkamal Singh	Dheeraj Babuaan	Neelkamal Singh

== Songs in other languages ==
=== Kannada songs ===
Year	Film/Album	Song	Composer(s)	Writer(s)	Co-singer(s)
2011	Hudugaru	"Naa Board Irada Bus"	V. Harikrishna	Yogaraj Bhat	V. Harikrishna, Naveen Madhav
2012	Yaare Koogadali	"Hello 1 2 3 Mike Testing"	V. Harikrishna	Yogaraj Bhat	Udit Narayan
2012	Shiva	"Appu Appu"	Gurukiran	Kaviraj	
2013	Dirty Picture: Silk Sakkath Maga	"Mattina Kannale Survay"	Jassie Gift		
2013	Jinke Mari	Bangaara Petege (Narasamma)"	Sai Karthik	Sai Karthik, Priya	
2014	Love Is Poison	"Shyane Ishta Criketu"	Sai Kiran	V. Nagendra Prasad	
2015	DK	"Sesamma"	Arjun Janya	Prem	
2016	Bettanagere	"Bandi Bandi"	Rajesh Ramanath	V. Nagendra Prasad	
2017	Simha Hakida Hejje	"Nan Hesaru Vimali"			

=== Marathi songs ===
Year	Film/Album	Song	Composer(s)	Writer(s)	Co-singer(s)
2014	Aashiyana	"Aashiyana (Title Track)"	Prabhakar Narwade		
2018	Truckbhar Swapna	"Selfie Wali"	Shreyassh		Suhas Sawant
2020	Email Friends	"Ghanta Vajavto"			
2023	Surya	"Rapchik Kolinbai"	Dev Chouhan	Santosh Darekar, Mangesh Thange, Dev Chouhan	

=== Tamil songs ===
Year	Film/Album	Song	Composer(s)	Writer(s)	Co-singer(s)
2011	Vedi	"Bombay Ponnu"	Vijay Antony	Viveka	M. L. R. Karthikeyan, Senthildas
2025	Kanguva	Mannippu	Devi Sri Prasad	Viveka	Raghu Dixit, Nakash Aziz, Ali Azmat

=== Telugu songs ===
Year	Film/Album	Song	Composer(s)	Writer(s)	Co-singer(s)
2012	Gabbar Singh	"Kevvu Keka"	Devi Sri Prasad	Sahiti	Murali
2012	Dracula 2012 (D)	"9848 Number"	Raghu Ram	Kedarnath Parimi	
2012	Dhamarukam	"Sakku Bhai"	Devi Sri Prasad	Ramajogayya Sastry	Suchith Suresan
2012	Naa Ishtam	"Jillele Jillele"	Chakri	Balaji	Adnan Sami
2013	Toofan	"Pinkie"	Meet Bros Anjjan	Chandrabose	
2014	Yevadu	"Ayyo Paapam"	Devi Sri Prasad	Ramajogayya Sastry	Ranjith
2014	Nuvve Naa Bangaram	"Vasthadu Vasthadu"	Vinod Yajamanya		
2015	Bengali Tiger	"Raye Raye"	Bheems Ceciroleo	Suddala Ashok Teja	Uma Neha, Simha
2016	Sardaar Gabbar Singh	"Khakhee Chokka"	Devi Sri Prasad		Simha
2016	Krishnashtami	"Leftu Punjabi Dressu"	Dinesh		Divya Kumar
2017	Jaya Janaki Nayaka	"A For Apple"	Devi Sri Prasad	Sri Mani	Sagar
2019	Dabangg 3	"Munna Chedipoyinaade"	Sajid–Wajid	Chandrabose	
2022	Khiladi	"Full Kick"	Devi Sri Prasad	Sri Mani	sagar
2024	Janata Bar	"Disco Jalebi"	Vinod Yajamanya		

=== Bengali songs ===
Year	Film/Album	Song	Composer(s)	Writer(s)	Co-singer(s)
2012	Khokababu	"Pyaar Ka Jhatka"	Rishi Chanda		Mika Singh
2012	Bikram Singha: The Lion Is Back	"Na Champa Na Chameli"	Bappi Lahiri		
2013	Har Mana Har	"Tor Moody Moody Chaal"			
2014	Taarkata	"Ghagra"	Arfin Rumey		
2017	Shrestha Bangali	"Chapa Nishka"	Anjjan Bhattacharya	Lipi	Dev Negi

=== Haryanvi songs ===
Year	Film/Album	Song	Composer(s)	Writer(s)	Co-singer(s)
2020	Chhakda	"Sun Banjaran Chori"			Sonu Khudaniya, Rashmi Khokhtar
2020	Chhakda	"Mukh Mod Ke"			Sonu Khudaniya, Rashmi Khokhtar
2020	Chhakda	"Yu Muk Mod Ke Chal Do Ge Kya"			Sonu Khudaniya, Rashmi Khokhtar
2020	Chhakda	"Pyar"			Sonu Khudaniya, Rashmi Khokhtar

== Non-film songs ==
Year	Film/Album	Song	Composer(s)	Writer(s)	Co-singer(s)	Ref
2011	Jaan Marbu Ka (Bhojpuri album)	"Jaan Marbu Ka"	Dinesh Agrahari Deewana		Dinesh Agrahari Deewana, Indu Sonali	
2011	Jaan Marbu Ka (Bhojpuri album)	"Saanvar Goriya"	Dinesh Agrahari Deewana		Dinesh Agrahari Deewana, Indu Sonali	
2011	Jaan Marbu Ka (Bhojpuri album)	"Jab Jab Yaad Aave"	Dinesh Agrahari Deewana		Dinesh Agrahari Deewana, Indu Sonali	
2011	Jaan Marbu Ka (Bhojpuri album)	"International Bank"	Dinesh Agrahari Deewana		Dinesh Agrahari Deewana, Indu Sonali	
2011	Jaan Marbu Ka (Bhojpuri album)	"Laange Na Manva"	Dinesh Agrahari Deewana		Dinesh Agrahari Deewana, Indu Sonali	
2011	Jaan Marbu Ka (Bhojpuri album)	"Ho Gail Vivah"	Dinesh Agrahari Deewana		Dinesh Agrahari Deewana, Indu Sonali	
2011	Jaan Marbu Ka (Bhojpuri album)	"Khaa Khub Saani Saani"	Dinesh Agrahari Deewana		Dinesh Agrahari Deewana, Indu Sonali	
2011	Jaan Marbu Ka (Bhojpuri album)	"Sainya Chhod Khetbaari"	Dinesh Agrahari Deewana		Dinesh Agrahari Deewana, Indu Sonali	
2011	Jaan Marbu Ka (Bhojpuri album)	"Shahari Style Waali"	Dinesh Agrahari Deewana		Dinesh Agrahari Deewana, Indu Sonali	
2017	Bum Bolo Bum (Single)	"Bum Bolo Bum"				
2017	Ek Lakh Ke More Lehengawa (Single)	"Ek Lakh Ke More Lehengawa"				
2018	Rajj Rajj Ankhiyan Roiyan (Single)	"Rajj Rajj Ankhiyan Roiyan"	Ramji Bulati		Bohemia	
2019	Song Change (Single)	"Song Change"			J.Hind	
2019	Yaara (Single)	"Yaara"	Bad-Ash	Bad-Ash		
2019	Tharak (Single)	"Tharak"	Bad-Ash		Nakash Aziz	
2020	Rang Barse (Single)	"Rang Barse"			Shaan	
2020	Yaariyan (Single)	"Yaariyan"	Bad-Ash			
