= Don't Know Why (disambiguation) =

Don't Know Why is a song written by Jesse Harris and popularized by Norah Jones

Don't Know Why may also refer to:

== Albums ==
- Don't Know Why, a 2003 album by Harold Mabern
- Don't Know Why, a 1998 album by Trish Thuy Trang

== Songs ==
- "I Don't Know Why", the first song on Evolve by Imagine Dragons
- "Don't Know Why" (SoundGirl song)
- "Don't Know Why", a song by Saves the Day
- "I Don't Know Why", a 1968 song by Stevie Wonder

== See also ==
- Dunno Y... Na Jaane Kyon, a 2010 Indian film
  - Dunno Y2... Life Is a Moment, its 2015 sequel
