= Rowdy Rathore (soundtrack) =

Soundtrack album by Sajid–Wajid
- Released: 2 May 2012
- Recorded: 2012
- Genre: Feature film soundtrack
- Length: 29:34
- Language: Hindi
- Label: UTV; Sony Music; Saregama
- Producer: Sajid–Wajid

Sajid–Wajid chronology
Housefull 2 (2012)	Rowdy Rathore (2012)	Teri Meri Kahaani (2012)

Rowdy Rathore is the soundtrack album to the 2012 film of the same name directed by Prabhu Deva and produced by Sanjay Leela Bhansali and Ronnie Screwvala under Bhansali Productions and UTV Motion Pictures, respectively. A remake of the Telugu film Vikramarkudu (2006), it stars Akshay Kumar and Sonakshi Sinha in the lead roles. The soundtrack featured seven songs composed by Sajid–Wajid and lyrics written by Faaiz Anwar and Sameer Anjaan. The album was released on 2 May 2012 to mixed reviews from critics.

== Background ==
Sajid–Wajid composed the film's soundtrack and score in his first collaboration with Deva and second with Kumar after Mujhse Shaadi Karogi (2004) and Housefull 2 (2012). On working with Deva, the duo stated "When a director inspires you, nothing can stop the entire team, as Rowdy Rathore proves. And he is a legend as a dancer, so the songs had to have that quality." When the duo met Kumar on the muhurat shot, Sajid realized that Kumar was into hip hop and Punjabi music; Kumar made them listen to some of the tracks while driving on his car, so that they could get some influences for the music.

Wajid confirmed that they had adapted the tune "Chinta Ta Chita Chita" and part of the song from the original Telugu film; Bhansali liked the original songs and had bought the rights to it for the adaptation, where the original tune being changed completely. The song "Aa Re Pritam Pyaare" used the hook from the Tamil song "Vaadi Vaadi Naattu Katta" from Alli Thandha Vaanam (2001).

== Release ==
The soundtrack was released on 2 May 2012, under the UTV Music label, a subsidiary of UTV Motion Pictures. Sony Music India distributed the album in digital formats, while Saregama published the physical copies.

== Reception ==
Devesh Sharma of Filmfare wrote "Sajid-Wajid have shown that they don’t need Salman Khan to deliver hit music and have kept their tag of mass entertainers alive with this outing." Joginder Tuteja of Bollywood Hungama wrote "Rowdy Rathore is undoubtedly a terrific offering for those who vouch for 'masala' soundtracks. This one doesn't promise to define anything new by charting a new path. Instead, it redefines the genre that had surprisingly been ignored for over a decade but is now making a comeback with a vengeance."

Not all reviews are positive, A reviewer based at Indo-Asian News Service stated "the album, despite the good songs, leaves a sense of discontentment. Having produced hit albums in the past, Sajid-Wajid definitely could have churned out something better." Karthik Srinivasan of Milliblog wrote "Rowdy, criminal (plagiarism) and meddlesome music."

== Controversy ==
Despite Wajid's confirmation on the song "Chinta Ta Chita Chita" being remade, Aditya Music, which procured the rights of the original song, filed a legal notice against Bhansali. The latter then paid ₹50 lakh (US$58,000) as a settlement to the label. Vidyasagar, who composed the song "Vaadi Vaadi Naattu Katta" whose hook was adapted into "Aa Re Pritam Pyaare", claimed that "I can’t believe they haven’t even bothered to let me know that they were lifting my tune. Let alone asking for permission or giving me credit — they haven’t even contacted me".

== Track listing ==
No.	Title	Lyrics	Singer(s)	Length
1.	"Dhadhang Dhang"	Faaiz Anwar	Wajid Khan, Shreya Ghoshal	4:35
2.	"Chinta Ta Ta Chita Chita"	Sameer Anjaan	Mika Singh, Wajid Khan	4:21
3.	"Aa Re Pritam Pyaare"	Sameer Anjaan	Mamta Sharma, Sarosh Sami	4:19
4.	"Chamak Challo Chel Chabeli"	Faaiz Anwar	Kumar Sanu, Shreya Ghoshal	5:04
5.	"Tera Ishq Bada Teekha"	Sameer Anjaan	Javed Ali, Shreya Ghoshal	4:25
6.	"Chandaniya (Lori Lori)"	Sameer Anjaan	Shreya Ghoshal	3:52
7.	"Rowdy Mix"	Shiraz Ahmed	Akshay Kumar, Sarosh Sami	4:13
Total length:				29:34

== Accolades ==
Award	Date of ceremony (Note: Date is linked to the article about the awards held that year, wherever possible.)	Category	Recipient(s) and nominee(s)	Result	Ref(s)
Apsara Film & Television Producers Guild Awards (Note: Also known as Star Guild Awards.)	16 February 2013	Best Male Playback Singer	Mika Singh (for the song "Chinta Ta Ta Chita Chita")	Nominated	
Zee Cine Awards	7 January 2013	Best Male Playback Singer	Mika Singh (for the song "Chinta Ta Ta Chita Chita")	Nominated	
Zee Cine Awards	7 January 2013	Song of the Year	"Chinta Ta Ta Chita Chita"	Nominated	
