= Vedita Pratap Singh =

Indian model and actor

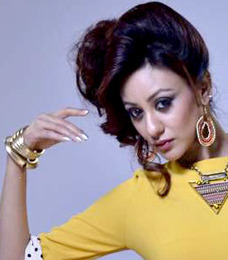
- Born: Prayagraj, Uttar Pradesh, India
- Occupations: Model; actor
- Spouse: Aaron Edward Sale

Vedita Pratap Singh (born Prayagraj, Uttar Pradesh, India) is an Indian model and actress. Her first film was Bhindi Bazaar.

== Career ==
In 2009, Singh won a swimming scholarship from the Sports Authority of India and also took part in various theatre productions. Later on, Singh starred in a touring production of Kadar Khan's play, Taash Ki Patti, which was presented around India and Dubai. Singh won the Channel V India television show "India's Hottest" in its 2008–2009 season. She was the female lead in Hemant Madhukar's Mumbai 125 KM.

Singh also acted as a cop in SuperCops Vs Super Villains. Additionally, she played a journalist in the 2017 Hindi feature film JD, directed by Shailendra Pandey. In the 2020 film The Hidden Strike, she played the role of an Indian Army officer.

Singh has campaigned for animal welfare.

== Personal life ==
In January 2021, Singh married Aaron Edward Sale at the Lake County Court in Montana, United States.

== Filmography ==
Year	Title	Role	Note
2001	Ssshhhh...Koi Hai	Vinita	Episode 13
2011	Bhindi Bazaar	Shabana	
2014	Mumbai 125 KM	Aashika	
2016-2017	SuperCops Vs Super Villains	Balwinder "Babli" Kaur	
2016	Adaalat 2	Sonika Malhotra	
2017	Danger	Nethra	
2017	JD	Noor	
2017	Feel The Horror		
2018	The Past	Simran	
2020	The Hidden Strike	Lt. Nikita Sharma	
