= Veena Malik =

Pakistani actress

- وينا ملک
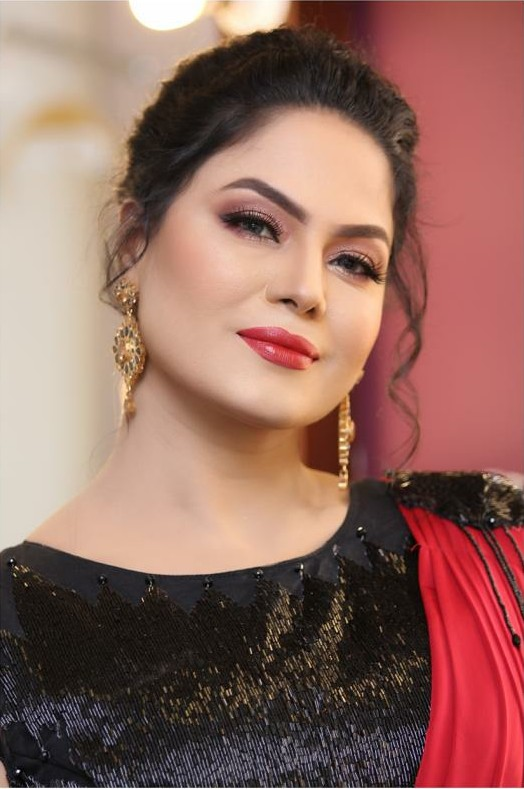
- Malik in 2019
- Born: Zahida Malik; 26 February; Rawalpindi, Punjab, Pakistan
- Occupations: Actress; model; host
- Years active: 2000–present
- Spouse: Asad Bashir Khan Khattak (m. 2013; div. 2018)
- Children: 2

Zahida Malik (born 26 February), better known as Veena Malik, is a Pakistani actress, TV host, and reality television personality who has appeared in Pakistani and Bollywood films. Veena made her film debut in 2000 with Sajjad Gul's Tere Pyar Mein. In 2002, she starred in Akbar Khan's Yeh Dil Aap Ka Huwa and Sassi Punno and later played roles in female-centric films such as Koi Tujh Sa Kahan (2005) and Mohabbatan Sachiyan (2007). She was a contestant on Bigg Boss in 2010.

== Early life ==
Veena was born as Zahida Malik on 26 February in Rawalpindi, Pakistan, to Malik Mohammad Aslam and his wife, Zeenat Malik.

== Career ==
=== Television ===
In 2002, Veena hosted the Prime TV series, Prime Gupshup for them ushering a new direction for her comic skills and she improvised on the hour-long show occasionally mimicking actors.

Veena hosted the Geo TV show Hum Sub Umeed Se Hain, in which she was hailed for her comedic parodies. In 2007, she appeared at the Lux Style Awards and was awarded as being the Most stylish celebrity on the carpet.

In October 2010, Veena appeared in the Indian television reality show Bigg Boss Season 4. She was evicted two weeks before the finals, and was one of the final six contestants out of the original fourteen who had participated. Veena was also part of the finale of the show. After her Bigg Boss stay, she was mentioned in the media as the voice of liberal Muslims, including leading dailies, Daily Times, Express Tribune, and The Australian. Sabbah Haji, from the Haji Amina Charity Trust in Jammu and Kashmir, writing in the magazine Tehelka, when comparing her with liberal rector of Darul Uloom Deoband said, "these two newly public figures might teach Muslims to stop feeling eternally outraged."

In February 2011, Veena became part of the Cricket World Cup reality show in Delhi, India, called "Big Toss." Big Toss was a reality game show with contestants and Veena as the captain of one team, against Rakhi Sawant and her team.

In March 2011, Veena engaged in a passionate debate with a mufti, who claimed she had engaged in immoral behaviour as a contestant on Bigg Boss, even though he admitted to not having watched the show. Veena countered pointing out the double standards of Pakistani media against women among other rebuttals.

Another show Veena Malik – Veena Ka Vivah was planned where Veena would search for her soul-mate, but the show was cancelled when Imagine TV, the channel on which the show was being shown, announced that it was shutting down. Veena collected almost 71,000 entries from all over the world for the show.

=== Films ===
Veena made her acting debut alongside Shaan and Zara Sheikh in Askari's Tere Pyar Mein (2000). She played a supporting role in the film and was barely acknowledged. Later on, she appeared in a supporting role in Javed Sheikh's Yeh Dil Aap Ka Huwa (2002).

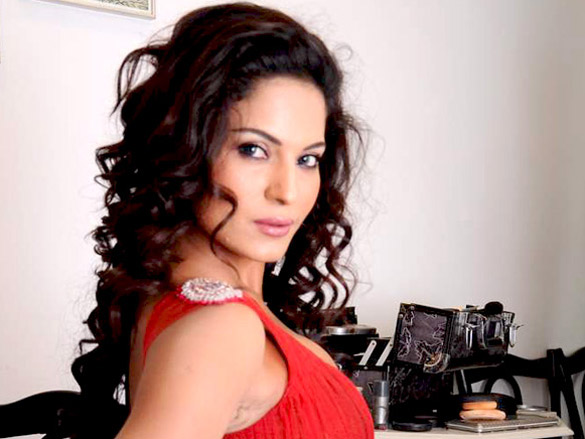
Veena Malik in 2011

In 2003, Veena appeared in Indo-Pak cross venture Punjabi film Pind Di Kudi which failed commercially. She also appeared in Askari's Sassi Punno (2003) alongside Sana and Moammar Rana. She then appeared in Rafique's Jageer. Her breakthrough role was in Reema Khan's Koi Tujh Sa Kahan. In the same year, she played the parallel lead role of Farwa in fantasy film Naag aur Nagin.

In 2007, Veena appeared in Rafique's Punjabi film, Mohabbatan Sachiyan, alongside Babrik Shah and newcomers Maria Khan and Adnan Khan. The film went on to become a commercial success. The same year, she appeared in Raza's Kabhi Pyar Na Karna in a supporting role.

In 2012, Veena debuted in Bollywood with an item song in Gali Gali Mein Chor Hai entitled "Chhanno". Then in the same month she did another item song "Fann Ban Gayi" in Tere Naal Love Ho Gaya. Then she made her acting debut with a comedy Daal Mein Kuch Kaala Hai. In 2013, her first film was Rajiv S. Ruia's social drama Zindagi 50 50 in which she played a prostitute. She appeared in the music video "Ac Chala Garmi Badi Hai" sung by Sukhdeep Grewal. Then she made a special appearance in Punjabi film, Jatts in Golmaal in an item song "Shabboo". She then made her Kannada film debut and appeared in Dirty Picture: Silk Sakkath Hot in which she portrayed the life of actress Silk Smitha for which she gained 5 kg. Her last film of 2013 was Super Model. Veena played a supermodel, a small town girl who becomes a success in the fashion industry. Her last Bollywood film was Hemant Madhukar's Mumbai 125 KM 3D that was released in 2014.

== Personal life ==
In 2013, it was announced that Malik was engaged to Pakistani businessman and crime boss Umar Farooq Zahoor.

Malik married businessman Asad Bashir Khan Khattak on 25 December 2013 in Dubai. They have two children together. They divorced in 2018.

Malik is a Muslim and claims to have visited Kaaba thrice.

== Philanthropy ==
Veena has worked as a representative at the World Health Organization for two years. She also sponsors a child at the SOS Children's Village, an NGO based in Pakistan working with orphaned children.

== In the media ==
In 2012 she was ranked at No. 26 on FHM India's "100 sexiest women list" which included Angelina Jolie, Megan Fox, Paris Hilton, Kim Kardashian, Shilpa Shetty and Sonam Kapoor.

== Controversies ==
=== FHM images ===
Controversy resulted in Pakistan over a nude image of Veena on the cover of FHM magazine India edition in which she had "ISI" written on her upper arm – the initials of Pakistan's Inter-Services Intelligence spy agency. Veena says she was topless but did not pose completely nude, and has sued the magazine over the images.

=== Legal troubles ===
In November 2014, Veena and her husband Asad were sentenced to 26 years in prison by a Gilgit court for allegedly airing a blasphemous programme. The owner of Pakistan's biggest media group, Geo TV and Jang group, was accused of allowing the airing of the blasphemous programme by Geo television in May, which played a religious song while staging a mock marriage of Veena with Bashir. A fine of Rs. 1.3 million (US$4,650) was also set. The judge sentenced Veena and Bashir and TV host Shaista Wahidi to 26 years each. She planned to appeal. They have yet to serve any time, as the ruling is not enforceable outside Gilgit.

== Filmography ==
Year	Title	Role	Notes	Country
2000	Tere Pyar Mein	Amina	Debut Film	Pakistan
2002	Yeh Dil Aap Ka Huwa	Sana	Nigar Award for Best Supporting Actress	Pakistan
2003	Pind Di Kudi	Saba		Pakistan
2004	Sassi Punno	Zarina		Pakistan
2005	Koi Tujh Sa Kahan	Aimen	Lux Style Award for Best Actress	Pakistan
2005	Kyun Tum Se Itna Pyar Hai	Aamina		Pakistan
2005	Naag aur Nagin	Farwa		Pakistan
2007	Mohabbatan Sachiyan	Salma	Lux Style Award for Best Actress	Pakistan
2008	Kabhi Pyar Na Karna	Nafisa		Pakistan
2008	Ishq Beparwaah	Ayesha		Pakistan
2012	Gali Gali Mein Chor Hai	Herself	Special appearance in song "Chhanno"	India
2012	Tere Naal Love Ho Gaya	Herself	Special appearance in a song "Fann Ban Gayi"	India
2012	Daal Mein Kuch Kaala Hai	Malai	Lead Role in Bollywood Film	India
2013	Jatts In Golmaal	Sujata	Special appearance in a song "Shaboo"	India
2013	Zindagi 50-50	Madhuri		India
2013	Dirty Picture: Silk Sakkath Maga	Silk Smitha / Vijaylakshmi	Kannada film	India
2013	Super Model	Rupali "Roops"		India
2014	Mumbai 125 KM 3D	Poonam/ Ghost		India
2014	Nangna Sityam	Dirtygirl / Vijaylakshmi	Telugu film	India

== Television ==
=== Drama serials ===
Year	Title	Role	Channel	Notes
1999	Kaun - Psycho Thriller		STN	Appeared in EP 7
2003	Achanak	Farhana	PTV Home	

=== TV Shows ===
Year	Show	Role	Language	Channel
2008	Hum Sub Umeed Se Hain	Herself	Urdu	Geo TV
2010	Miss Duniya	Herself	Urdu	Dunya News
2012	Astaghfaar	Herself	Urdu	Hero TV
2016	Mazaaq Raat	Herself	Urdu	Dunya News
2024	Discover Pakistan With Veena Malik	Herself	Urdu	Discover Pakistan
2026	Veena Hai Na	Herself	Urdu	24 News HD

=== Reality television ===
As Contestant

Year	Show	Standing	Channel
2010	Bigg Boss 4	6th place Evicted Day 83	Colors
2011	Bigg Toss Reality Game Show	Runner-up	India TV
2011	Superstud	Guest	UTV Bindass

== Discography ==
As lead artist

Title	Year	Album
"Drama Queen"	2012	Drama Queen
"Rum Rum"	2013	Drama Queen

As featured artist

Title	Year	Album
"Ac chala" (Sukhdeep Grewal featuring Veena Malik)	2013	Dj Queen

== See also ==
- List of Pakistani actresses

== Bibliography ==
- Stardom in Contemporary Hindi Cinema: Celebrity and Fame in Globalized Times. Germany, Ed. Aysha Iqbal Viswamohan, Clare M. Wilkinson, Springer Singapore, 2020.
- Fatima Aziz, Microcelebrity Around the Globe ISBN 978-1-78756-750-4, 978-1-78756-749-8 Publication date: 19 November 2018
- Televisual Pakistan First Published 16 June 2020 Volume: 10 issue: 2, page(s): 105-110; Issue published: 1 December 2019 Ravi Vasudevan, Rosie Thomas, S. V. Srinivas, Kartik Nair, Debashree Mukherjee, Lotte Hoek, Salma Siddique
