= Gajab Desh Ki Ajab Kahaniyaan =

- Genre: Reality show
- Created by: UTV Software Communications
- Developed by: Srikanth Prabhala
- Written by: Sukhwant Kalsi
- Directed by: Huzzefa
- Presented by: Rakhi Sawant
- Country of origin: India
- Original language: Hindi

Production
- Cinematography: Nitesh Choudhary
- Editor: Umashankar Mishra

Original release
- Network: Imagine TV
- Release: 28 June 2011

Gajab Desh Ki Ajab Kahaniyaan was an Indian television show hosted by actress and item girl Rakhi Sawant and created by UTV Software Communications which aired on NDTV Imagine. Based on Rakhi's earlier show, Rakhi Ka Insaaf, Rakhi showcases bizarre cases of a particular celebrity and a common man. Unlike the previous series, Rakhi Ka Insaaf, which had a serious tone, this show had a lighter and more comical tone.

== Show concept ==
The show consists of one-hour episodes where Rakhi Sawant interviews a controversial celebrity. Included in each episode is a segment that feature of some bizarre events in India.

== Critical response ==
The newspaper Indian Express reviewed the show saying, "huge waste of time and effort, ours that is, to even try to see it." Deccan Chronicle called it "A Show that Rejects Talents."
