= Bhindi Bazaar (film) =

2011 Indian Hindi-language crime thriller film directed by Ankush Bhatt

- Directed by: Ankush Bhatt
- Written by: Ghalib Asadbhopali
- Screenplay by: Ghalib Asadbhopali
- Story by: Kapil Gulati
- Produced by: Karan Arora
- Starring: Kay Kay Menon; Prashant Narayanan; Gautham K. Sharma; Jackie Shroff; Pawan Malhotra
- Cinematography: Ramshreya Rao & Viraj Singh Gohil
- Edited by: Imaran-Faisal Mahavik
- Music by: Score: Abhishek Mahavir; Songs: Sandeep-Saurya
- Production company: Picture Thoughts Production
- Release date: 17 June 2011
- Running time: 119 minutes
- Country: India
- Language: Hindi
- Budget: ₹5.0 Cr
- Box office: ₹1.19 Crore

Bhindi Bazaar Inc is a 2011 Indian Hindi-language crime thriller film. It's stars Kay Kay Menon, Prashant Narayanan, Gautham K. Sharma and supporting with Pawan Malhotra, Piyush Mishra and Jackie Shroff. Directed by Ankush Bhatt and produced by Karan Arora, the film released on 17 June 2011.

== Plot ==
Based in Bhindi Bazar, Mumbai, Mamu is a gangster, who leads a gang of men and women who pick pockets of civilians on busy streets and over-crowded BEST buses. His wife, Bano, manages all household work, and after getting overwhelmed, gets her cousin, Shabana, to re-locate and live with them. Bano soon finds that the latter is more interested in her husband but is unable to assert herself. After a steamy bout of intimacy with Shabana, Mamu's heart fails and he passes away. A power struggle ensues - with a rival, Shankar Pandey, deciding to get more assertive - resulting in a gang-war. Amidst a rapidly spreading influenza virus, Fateh decides to take over the reins from Mamu, while Shabana takes an active interest in the former as well as makes plans for a seemingly helpless and widowed Bano.

== Cast ==
- Kay Kay Menon As Shroff
- Prashant Narayanan As Fateh
- Gautham K. Sharma As Tezz/Tabrez
- Pawan Malhotra As Mamu
- Shilpa Shukla As Kanjri
- Sweta Verma As Simran
- Deepti Naval As Baano
- Vedita Pratap Singh As Shabana
- Piyush Mishra As Shankar Panday
- Jackie Shroff As Narcotics Officer.
- Caterina Lopez
