= Super Model (film) =

- Theatrical poster
- Directed by: Navin Batra
- Produced by: Ravi Ahlawat
- Starring: Veena Malik; Ashmit Patel; Jackie Shroff; Harsh Chhaya
- Edited by: Jigar C. Bhuva
- Music by: DJ Sheizwood
- Distributed by: Pen N Camera International
- Release date: 27 September 2013
- Country: India
- Language: Hindi

Super Model is a 2013 Hindi thriller featuring Veena Malik and Ashmit Patel in the lead roles. The supporting cast includes Harsh Chhaya and Jackie Shroff. It was released worldwide on 27 September.

== Plot ==
Every girl harbors a secret desire to make it big in the glamorous world of showbiz and becoming a hot shot model is one of the obvious routes to fame and glory. However, many such aspirants tend to overlook the struggle, competition and politics associated with this challenging profession.

Super Model depicts their moment of glory. The story revolves around five models who participate in a bikini calendar shoot contest in the Fiji Islands to fulfill their dream of becoming a super model. When they reach the islands, rival games start and all the models get trapped in a conspiracy which is set off by the murder of one of the contestants. It is the journey of aspiring models into the fashion industry. It is about the professional and personal struggle that middle class girls have to go through to finally achieve.

A wine baron (Harsh Chhaya) is scouting for Super Models to endorse & launch his new wine brand in the market. He recruits a photographer (Ashmit Patel) to organize a talent hunt in Fiji for the same. A midst this backdrop, an upcoming model (Veena Malik) faces competition from other beauties for the endorsement deal until the contestants mysteriously start getting murdered one by one and the needle of blame seems to point towards her!

== Cast ==
- Ashmit Patel as Vijay Malia/Monty
- Veena Malik as Rupali
- Harsh Chhaya as Dev Walia
- Bobby Darling as Bobby
- Adi Irani as Rohit
- Jackie Shroff
- Nataliya Kozhenova
- Aparna Jadhav
- Sana Oberoi
- Manu Rajappq
- Vishakha Gupta
- Prabha Ali
- Wahid Ali

== Soundtrack ==
Super Model

Soundtrack album by: Dj Sheizwood
- Released: 8 August 2013
- Genre: Soundtrack
- Length: 28:05
- Producer: Ravi Ahlawat

Track listing
No.	Title	Lyrics	Singer(s)	Length
1.	"I Wanna Be Super Model"	Kunwar Juneja	Taranum Malik, Naman Shastri	3:50
2.	"Teri Maa Nu"	Kunwar Juneja, Hari Shankar Sufi	Mika Singh	3:13
3.	"Tujh Se Alag Tujh Se Juda"	Hari Shankar Sufi	Ujjawala Jadhav, Shabab Sabri	3:56
4.	"Vodka Shot"	Kunwar Juneja, Hari Shankar Sufi	Taranum Malik, Naman Shastri	4:00
5.	"Teri Maa Nu" (Remix)		Mika Singh	3:48
6.	"Tujh Se Alag Tujh Se Juda" (Remix)		Ujjawala Jadhav, Shabab Sabri	5:50
7.	"Vodka Shot" (Remix)		Taranum Malik, Naman Shastri	4:48

== Controversy ==
Veena Malik, Pakistani actress claimed that the poster of the Poonam Pandey starrer, Nasha is a copy of her film, SuperModel. She claims that the poster of her movie is original and was shot 9 months before the release of the film. She also said that she hopes the sequences of her film are safe until the release.

Another controversy revolving around her is that she has worn too many bikinis in the film and doesn't intend on wearing it ever again.

== Critical reception ==
Super Model was panned by critics upon release.
