= Astaghfaar =

Pakistani TV series

- Genre: Religious
- Directed by: Abdul Samad Khaliq
- Presented by: Veena Malik
- Country of origin: Pakistan
- Original language: Urdu

Production
- Executive producer: Taqi Shaheen
- Producer: Abdul Samad Khaliq
- Running time: 30 minutes (per episode)

Original release
- Network: Hero TV

Astaghfaar is a TV show which aired on Hero TV in 2012. The series was hosted by Veena Malik and aired on weekdays at the 8 pm timeslot PKT in the Islamic month of Ramadan.

The show has been a subject of controversies even before its initiation. The channel previously planned to cancel the show following a public outcry but later decided to air the first six episodes to gauge the reaction of the viewers. Unexpectedly the show proved to be a TRP churner and generated a hospitable reception from the audience.

The show peaked at a near 30 million viewership on 13 August 2012 which marked the episode as one of the most-watched television telecast in Pakistan. After the overwhelming response from the audience the show was reinstated to air for its complete full season. Malik on such an unpredictable reaction stated "It’s a great feeling that people across the globe have appreciated my effort and also, accepted my show. The show has touched the heart of people which is gauged with the TRP ratings".

== Episodes ==
Episode #	Title	Original release date
1	"Nafarmaan Auladen Karengi Astaghfaar"	5 August 2012
2	"Nafarmaan Biwiyaan Karengi Astaghfaar"	6 August 2012
3	"Masoom Larkiyon Ko Bewaqoof Bananay Walay Larkay Karain Gay Astaghfaar"	7 August 2012
4	"Haram Kamanay Walay Karain Gay Astaghfaar"	8 August 2012
5	"Fahash Filmain Dekhnay Walay Karain Gay Astaghfaar"	9 August 2012
6	"Siyasat Daan Karain Gay Astaghfaar"	10 August 2012
7	"Har Badkaar Karay Ga Astaghfaar"	12 August 2012
8	"Kala Jadoo Karnay Walay Karain Gay Astaghfaar"	13 August 2012
9	"Qaum Kay Ghadaar Karain Gay Astaghfaar"	14 August 2012
10	"Na Shukri Karnay Walay Karain Gay Astaghfaar"	15 August 2012
11	"Bay Pardah Log Karain Gay Astaghfaar"	16 August 2012
12	"Saas Bahoo Karain Gii Astaghfaar"	17 August 2012
13	"Sab Paisay Kay Pujari Karain Gay Astaghfaar"	18 August 2012
