= Yuvraaj Parashar =

Indian actor

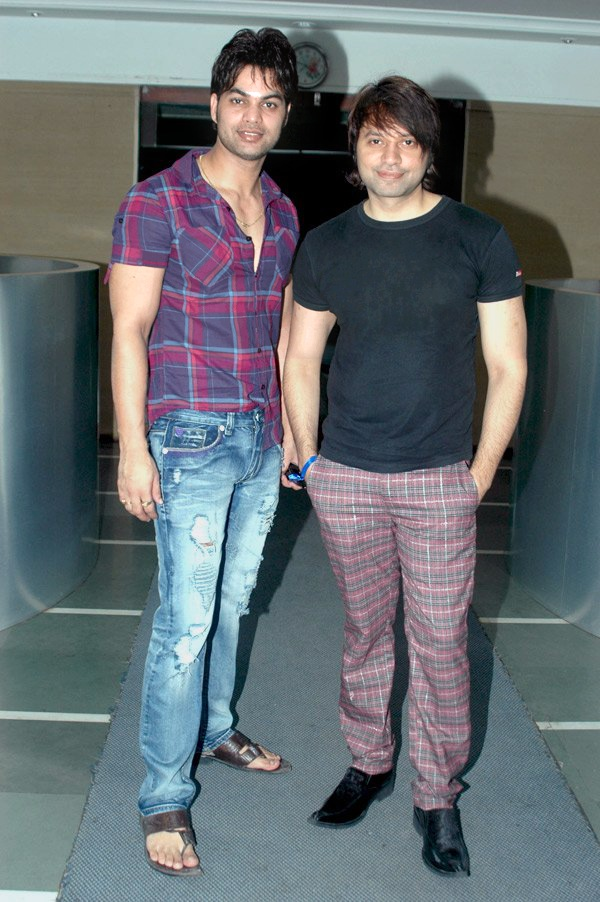
Yuvraaj on the left

Yuvraaj Parashar is an Indian Bollywood model and film actor who starred in India's first homosexual film, Dunno Y... Na Jaane Kyon (Don't Know Why) (2010). His parents have taken legal action to disown him because of the film, despite winning acclaim from Deputy Chief Minister of Maharashtra Chhagan Bhujbal for their portrayal of bisexual men. Parashar is originally from Agra in India. Dunno Y... Na Jaane Kyun got 11 international awards including best actors and best film.

== Filmography ==
- 2008 - Fashion as Gaurav
- 2010 - Dunno Y Na Janne Kyun as Ashley
- 2015 - Dunno Y2... Life is a Moment as Ashley
- 2016 - Love Life & Screw Ups as Arjun
- 2018 - The Past as Yuvraj Malhotra
- 2019 - Moksh to Maya
- 2019 - Sajda, Music single
- 2019 - Mehroo, Music single
- 2019 - Atharva, Music single
- 2020 - The Last Breath, Music single
- 2020 - Love life & Screw Ups season 02 as Arjun
- 2021 - Lights camera MURDER as Avinash Kapoor
- 2021 Bahaar as writer and director
- 2021 Kesar as writer and director
- 2021 Ahsaas as Farhad (lead actor)
