= Agnichakra =

1997 Hindi film

Agnichakra (transl. Wheel of Fire) is a Hindi-language action drama film directed by Amit Suryavanshi and produced by Piyush Kumar. This film was released on 26 February 1997 under the banner of Jyoti Arts Productions.

== Plot ==
Tasked with catching the terrorist Jumbo, police inspector Suryaveer goes to Jumbo's forest hideout along with Satpal, another police officer. Jumbo kills Suryaveer and severely inures Satpal. Now Amar, Suryaveer's brother, must to track down the terrorists and revenge his older brother's death.

== Cast ==
- Govinda as Amar
- Naseeruddin Shah as Police Inspector Satpal
- Dimple Kapadia as Rani
- Anupam Kher as Dhanraj
- Raj Kiran as Police Inspector Suryaveer
- Virendra Mahthan as Inspector Vishal
- Rakhi Sawant as Ruhi Sawant
- Pramod Moutho as Jumbo
- Satish Shah as Sada Ranglani
- Raju Srivastav as Joseph

== Soundtrack ==
All songs were composed by Bappi Lahiri and penned by Amit Khanna.

- "Dil Dene Se Pehle Dobara Sochna" - Kumar Sanu, Alka Yagnik
- "Arzi Mere Dil Ki" - Alka Yagnik, Bappi Lahiri
- "Paisa Hi Paisa" - Sudesh Bhosle, Asha Bhosle
- "Aila Rani Ka Dil Kho Gaya" - Kavita Krishnamurthy, Amit Kumar
- "Gup Chup Gup Chup" - Sudesh Bhosle, Parvati Khan
- "Mera Naam Action" - Amit Kumar
- "Tere Paas Tota Hain" - Vinod Rathod, Poornima

== Reception ==
Komal Nahta called it "a poor fare".
