= Mumbai 125 KM =

- Film poster
- Directed by: Hemant Madhukar
- Written by: Dheeraj Rattan
- Story by: Hemant Madhukar
- Produced by: Hemant Madhukar; Mani Sharma; Nishant Pitti
- Starring: Joey Debroy; Karanvir Bohra; Vedita Pratap Singh; Veena Malik
- Cinematography: Manoj Shaw
- Edited by: Sandeep Sethy
- Music by: Mani Sharma
- Production companies: Sri Mahati Media; Light & Shadow Productions
- Release date: 17 October 2014
- Running time: 99 minutes
- Country: India
- Language: Hindi
- Box office: ₹14.65 crore

Mumbai 125 KM is a 2014 Indian Hindi-language horror film directed by Hemant Madhukar and produced by Nishant Pitti from EaseMyTrip. It stars Joey Debroy, Karanvir Bohra, Vedita Pratap Singh, and Veena Malik as the main antagonist. It is the remake of the French horror film Dead End (2003).

== Plot ==
Aashika wakes up frightened in a hospital and goes into a flashback. A group of friends - Prem, Jacks, Aashika, Diya and Vivek - decide to travel to Mumbai to celebrate New Year's Day. While travelling, a patrolling cop halts the car and interrogates them on the account of driving under the influence of alcohol, to which Prem bribes him into letting them go. That night, they encounter weird situations and a baby's cradle, which they avoid. Prem accidentally hits a car; while figuring out who they hit, they come across a man who warns them to back off or else they will all be killed. The friends try to take the man to the cop they bribed earlier, but find the cop brutally murdered. The man suddenly disappears.

The friends sense danger and find a way to get back off the road but the road, seems to be endless. They encounter a girl and offer her a lift. The friends assume that she's a mental patient and try to take her to a hospital. Leaving to find the asylum in the jungle, they leave Jacks in the car with the girl. Jacks is murdered. Prem and Vivek later come out of their car and have an argument. Splitting ways, Vivek discovers an abandoned house where he gets brutally killed by the mysterious girl. Prem, Aashika and Diya are now the only survivors. Prem orders the girls to stick together but a scared Diya runs away and gets killed. Scared, Prem and Aashika run and Prem ends up in a graveyard. He witnesses his deceased friends' souls and gets killed by the girl.

In the present, Aashika in the hospital finds out about the girl from a nurse. The girl's name is Poonam. She visits Poonam's house and witnesses Poonam's husband's and mother-in-law's souls. The mother-in-law explains that Poonam was eccentric and wanted a child. She argued with her now-dead husband for a child and her mental condition worsened after her delivery. The doctor advises Poonam's husband that she needs counselling. It is also revealed that Prem and his friends crashed Poonam's car and killed her, her husband, and her child. Poonam returns as a ghost and swears vengeance upon the friends for murdering her child. Aashika was only saved because she was pregnant with Prem's child. Aashika's parents call her and reveal that her child was aborted. This angers Poonam, and she kills Aashika.

== Cast ==
- Joey Debroy as Prem
- Karanvir Bohra as Jacks
- Veena Malik as Poonam
- Vedita Pratap Singh as Aashika
- Aparnaa Bajpai as Diya
- Vije Bhatia as Vivek
- Rajiv Anand as Poonam's husband

== Production ==
The film was shot in 82 nights. It is shot entirely on stereoscopic 3D cameras and released in 2D and 3D formats.

== Soundtrack ==
Mumbai 125 KM

Soundtrack album by Mani Sharma
- Released: 21 August 2014
- Genre: Film soundtrack
- Length: 21:28
- Label: Zee Music
- Producer: Hemant Madhukar

The album's songs were Mani Sharma performed by multiple singers including Zubeen Garg, Chitra Sivaraman, Shalmali Kholgade and others and lyrics were penned by Kumaar and Sravana Bhargavi.

Song	Singer(s)	Duration
"Tere Bina"	Zubeen Garg	5:01
"Nanhi Si"	Chithra Sivaraman	2:08
"Gum Gum"	Bol Bhargavi	4:02
"Ringa Ringa"	Harshit Tomar	3:49
"Saazish"	Monali Thakur	6:28

== Critical reception ==
Rahul Desai from Mumbai Mirror gave 0.5 out of 5 claiming that film has been made with incompetent direction. Bryan Durham from Daily News and Analysis gave 1 star rating out of 5 and stated "Mumbai 125 KM is a fine example why Indian filmmakers should keep away from thrashing the holy house of horror which is adorned by classics like The Excorcist, The Omen, The Conjuring and many more." Shubha Shetty-Saha from Mid-Day gave 0.5 stars out of 5 stating film has unnecessary content and themes. Radio Jockey Jeeturaj from Radio Mirchi gave 3 stars out of 5. In a review written for The Times of India, Renuka Vyavahare deemed Veena Malik's "show-stealer" character the biggest detriment to a film that "as a slasher, gets too monotonous and repetitive... old wine in an old bottle."

== Box office ==
The film grossed ₹14.65 crores in India.

== See also ==
- List of Bollywood films of 2014
