= Umar Farooq Zahoor =

Norwegian- Pakistani businessman and crime boss (born 1975)

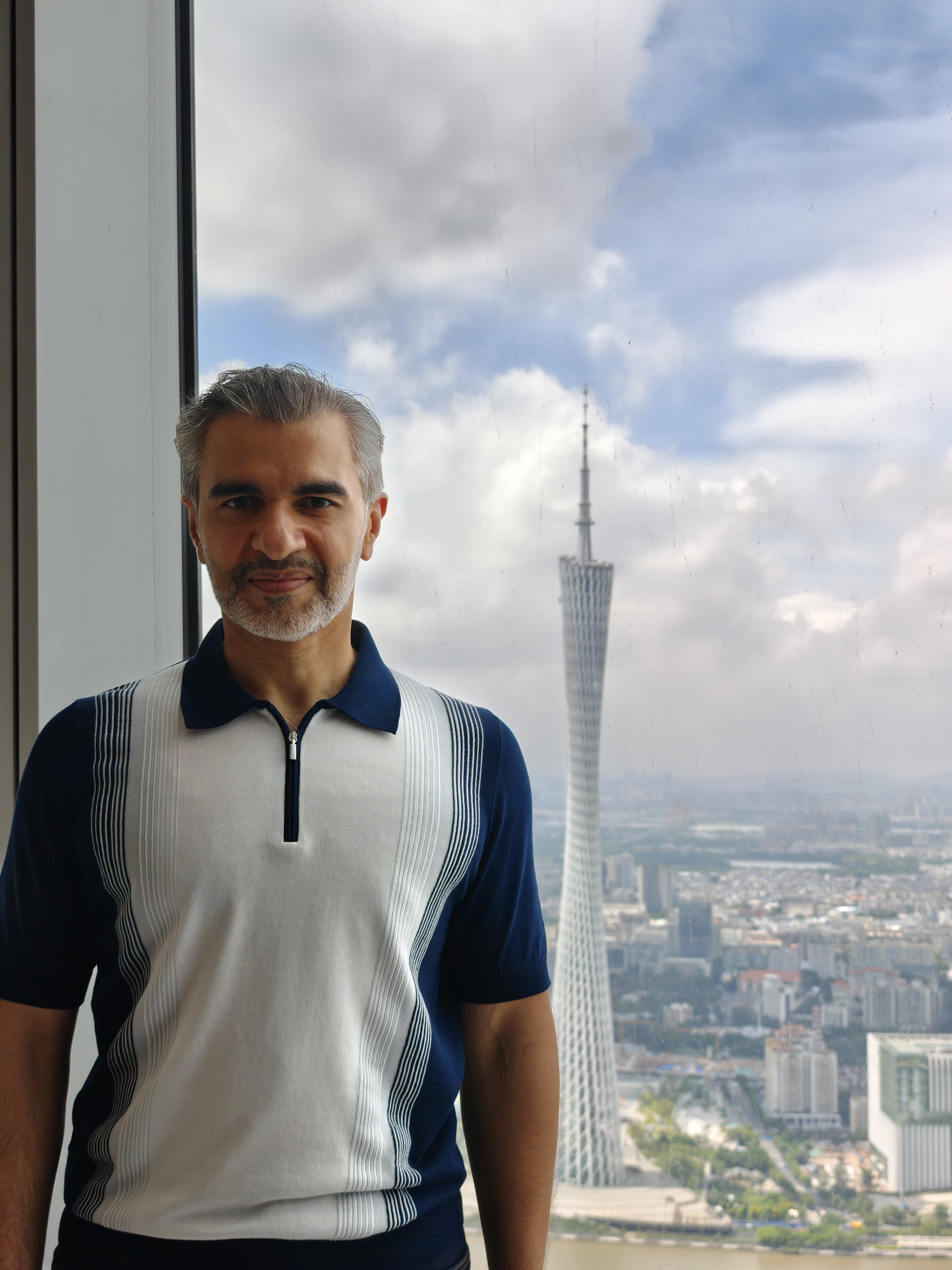
- Born: October 26, 1975 (age 51); Norway
- Citizenship: Pakistan
- Occupations: Businessman; Crime boss
- Years active: 2000–present
- Known for: Financial crimes in Norway
- Criminal charges: Gross fraud in Norway
- Criminal penalty: Five years and nine months in prison
- Criminal status: Absconder
- Spouse: Sofia Mirza (m. 2006; div. 2009)
- Partner: Veena Malik
- Awards: Hilal-e-Imtiaz (2024, 2025)
- Website: sheikhumarfarooq.com

Umar Farooq Zahoor (Punjabi: عمر فاروق ظہور; born October 26, 1975) is a Norwegian-born Pakistani businessman, crime boss, and convicted felon. Since 2010, he is a fugitive sought in Norway for financial crimes. Previously, he was wanted by Interpol for similar crimes. His family has been described as one of the largest mafia families of Norway. Zahoor was previously affiliated with Ameri Group, where he was CEO until August 2015.

In 2026, he was reported to be based in Dubai and to describe himself on social media as a businessman, market investor, and entrepreneur.

== Early life ==
Umar Farooq Zahoor was born on 26 October, 1975 in Oslo, Norway to Pakistani parents who were originally from Sialkot. He grew up and initially studied in Oslo before moving to the Middle East.

== Career ==
He started his own travel agency at the age of 18 and has done business in Switzerland, Mexico, Dubai and Egypt, among other places. In the 2014 book by Hans Petter Aass and Rolf J. Widerøe titled The Coup: On the Inside of Norway's Most Powerful Mafia Family, the Zahoor family is described as one of the largest crime families of Norway.

In 2000, Zahoor embezzled tickets worth over 15 million NOK through his own travel agency.

Zahoor has also faced scrutiny in Switzerland over allegations related to dubious business activities. In 2003, Zahoor founded a fake bank named, Banque Internationale Ltd. in Switzerland with Shaun Gregory Morgan who was from New Zealand. Morgan was sentenced to three and a half years in prison in 2006, but in 2009, he received a sentence of five years after several victims came forward. Umar Zahoor was wanted by Interpol for a number of charges, including defrauding 27 people of NOK 120 million through the fake bank in Switzerland. In the same year, Zahoor was sentenced in the Oslo district court to one year in prison for gross embezzlement.

In 2004, Zahoor was arrested in Pakistan and, according to him, tortured by the Pakistani police. The arrest was based on a complaint by Imtiaz Ahmed Sheikh, a Turkish businessman and politician who was himself indicted the following year for extensive corruption.

In 2010, Usman Zahoor, Zahoor's brother, and four fellow runners defrauded Randi Nilsen, Gunnar Block Watne's widow, of more than NOK 63 million. The police state that Usman Farooq Zahoor was the mastermind behind a fraud of more than NOK 111 million. The money was transferred using a false power of attorney through Nordea's branch at Tveita in Oslo and ended up in Dubai, where it is believed to be controlled by Umar Zahoor. Zahoor himself claims that he does not control this money. In the same year, he lent five million NOK to the wind power company NBT AS. In September 2011, these five individuals were sentenced in the Oslo District Court, and Usman Zahoor received the most severe sentence of ten years' imprisonment. When the appeal case came up before the Borgarting Court of Appeal, he pleaded guilty to gross fraud. The Court of Appeal found Usman Farooq Zahoor guilty of gross fraud but acquitted him and some of the co-accused of having acted as an organized criminal group. The court set the sentence for Usman Zahoor at five years and nine months in prison. Later, the Supreme Court of Norway also issued Zahoor's arrest warrants in connection with one of Norway's biggest bank fraud cases, which involved money laundering.

In 2015, Zahoor was involved in a large contract between the company Ameri Group and the authorities in Ghana.

In November 2022, Zahoor revealed that the Pakistan Tehreek-e-Insaf (PTI) government had sold a Graff wristwatch, gifted to former prime minister of Pakistan Imran Khan by Saudi Crown Prince Mohammad Bin Salman, for US$2 million. Khan later also acknowledged selling some gifts, including this watch, during his tenure as prime minister. Imran Khan said he will approach international courts against Umar Zahoor, Jang Group over gift sale allegation. Pakistan's Chief of Army Chief Asim Munir has been described as viewing Imran Khan as a rival, a dynamic that has been interpreted by some observers as indicative of Zahoor’s alignment.

In April 2026, Zahoor met with US Vice President JD Vance as part of the Pakistani delegation during the Islamabad Talks. Special Envoy Steve Witkoff introduced Zahoor to the Vice President. The meeting drew attention not only because Zahoor appeared alongside senior U.S. officials, but also due to the differing perceptions of him across countries. His presence at such a high-profile diplomatic event in Islamabad prompted questions about how an individual wanted in Europe over alleged financial crimes came to attend.

== Wealth ==
Zahoor's investments span real estate, IT, energy projects, agriculture, and more across the United Arab Emirates and other countries. He maintained close ties with various royal family members in the Middle East and collaborates with several heads of state in Africa, Southeast Asia, the Caribbean, and South America.

== Awards and recognition ==
On 14 August 2024, President Asif Zardari awarded the Hilal-e-Imtiaz to Zahoor on Independence Day for his role in the Toshakhana reference case against Imran Khan. On the 2025 Independence Day, he was again awarded the Hilal-e-Imtiaz for his role during the 2025 India–Pakistan conflict.

== Personal life ==
In 2006, he married Pakistani actress Sofia Mirza, and had twin daughters with her. When the marriage was dissolved in 2009, the mother was granted custody of the twins, and for fear that Zahoor would take the daughters out of Pakistan, the children were put on a no-fly list to prevent them from leaving the country. In the same year, he kidnapped the daughters and smuggled them out of Pakistan using fake passports.

In 2013, it was announced that Zahoor had become engaged to Pakistani actress Veena Malik. The following year, Malik was sentenced to 26 years in prison for blasphemy, but had already escaped to Dubai by then.
