= Tere Jism Se Jaan Tak =

- Theater poster
- Directed by: Raj Dayal
- Written by: Subodh Nagdeve
- Story by: Subodh Nagdeve
- Produced by: Dhananjay Galani
- Starring: Nataliya Kozhenova; Vinit Kakar; Shyam Bhimsariya; Shilpa Sharma; Dhananjay Galani; Ramesh Goyal
- Edited by: Shiva Bayappa
- Distributed by: Lavlin Films
- Release date: 30 October 2015 (Mumbai)
- Running time: 1 hrs 30 minutes
- Country: India
- Language: Hindi

Tere Jism se Jaan Tak is a Bollywood film made in Hindi language, directed by Raj Dayal and produced by Dhananjay Galani. It is made under the banner of Lavlin films and was released on 30 October 2015 all over India.

== Plot ==
Vikrant and Nisha have been dating for the past six months. He once took Nisha to his uncle's (Ramesh Goyal) farmhouse far from the city. After reaching there Vikrant tells Nisha that he will be the owner of this property soon but there are two conditions. First that he has to get married and second that he will have to prove he is not impotent. After living some days in that farmhouse, Nisha realizes that someone is watching both of them. She tells this to Vikrant but he does not believe her.

Vikrant's lawyer realizes that Vikrant and Nisha are not married and are lying. He makes a condition that they make love in front of him. Nisha agrees but Vikrant does not. Nisha learns that Vikrant had a girl in his life before Bobby. Nisha does not know where Bobby is right now and what happened between Vikrant and Bobby.

== Cast ==
- Nataliya Kozhenova
- Vinit Kakar
- Shilpa Sharma
- Shyam Bhimsaria
- Ramesh Goyal
- Dhananjay Galani

== Technical team ==
- Director: Raj Dayal
- Producer: Dhananjay Galani
  - Story, Screen play & Dialogue: Subodh Nagdeve
  - Music Director: Susheel Pendari

== Music ==
- Music Director: Susheel Pendari
- Lyrics: Subodh Nagdeve
- Singer: Rajesh Dayal & Vaishali Phadke

== Genres ==
- Mystery, Romance

== Release date ==
Tere Jism se jaan tak released on 30 October 2015
