= Nataliya Kozhenova =

Ukrainian actress

- Born: Nataliya; Ukraine
- Occupation: Actress
- Years active: 2010–present

Nataliya Kozhenova is a Ukrainian actress who has worked in Hindi films. She is best known as the main protagonist of the movie Anjunaa Beach.

== Career ==
In 2012, Kozhenova debuted with a leading role in the film Anjunaa Beach. After this, she appeared in movies such as Super Model (2013) and starred in Tere Jism Se Jaan Tak (2015). She has acted in Hindi films Atithi Tum Kab Jaoge?, Super Model, Tere Jism Se Jaan Tak and Bole India Jai Bhim.

== Filmography ==
=== Films ===
| Year | Title | Role | Language |
|---|---|---|---|
| 2010 | Atithi Tum Kab Jaoge | Guest appearance | Hindi |
| 2012 | Anjunaa Beach | Main Lead | Hindi |
| 2013 | Super Model | Parallel Lead | Hindi |
| 2015 | Tere Jism Se Jaan Tak | Main lead | Hindi |
| 2016 | Bole India Jai Bhim | Self | Hindi & Marathi |
| 2017 | Love Vs Gangster | Main lead | Hindi |
| 2021 | Evil Dead Is Back | Monica | Hindi & English |
| TBA | The Battle of Bhima Koregaon | | Hindi |

=== Web series ===
| Year | Title | Role | Language | Platform | Notes |
|---|---|---|---|---|---|
| 2019 | Gandii Baat S04 E04 | Christie | Hindi | ALTBalaji ZEE5 | |
