= Sassi Punno =

- Directed by: Hassan Askari
- Written by: Saleem Murad
- Produced by: Sohail Butt; Mohammad Younas
- Starring: Moammar Rana; Veena Malik; Sana Nawaz; Saud; Shafqat Cheema
- Cinematography: Pervez Khan
- Edited by: Khalid Bakkir
- Music by: M. Arshad
- Production companies: Evernew Studios; A B Films
- Release date: 2004
- Country: Pakistan
- Language: Urdu

Sassi Punno is a 2004 Pakistani film in the Urdu language. It was directed by Hassan Askari.

== Plot ==
The story is about a love triangle between character portrayed by Moammar Rana, Sana Nawaz and Veena Malik. The film is based on one of the four popular tragic romances of Sindh, Pakistan. Sassi Punnu folk tale was originally written by the Sindhi Sufi poet, Shah Abdul Latif Bhittai (1689-1752). Many movies have been made based on this folk tale in the past. This film is one of them.

Veena Malik is in love with Moammar Rana, while he loves Sana. Veena Malik's father tries to end this relationship for his daughter's sake. Moammar and Sana are locked up when they try to escape and suffer for each other.

== Film performance ==
The film was financially unsuccessful, especially in Lahore.<

== Cast and crew ==
- Moammar Rana
- Sana
- Saud
- Veena Malik
- Safqat Cheema
- Rashid Mehmood

Music composer was M. Arshad, film song lyrics by Riaz ur Rehman Saghar. Playback singers were Naseebo Lal, Saira Nasim, Ameer Ali.
