= Gautham K. Sharma =

Indian model and actor

Gautham K Sharma
- Born: Mumbai, India
- Other name: Gautham K Sharma
- Occupations: Model, Actor.
- Known for: 'Tez' in Bhindi Bazaar.

Gautham K Sharma is an Indian model and actor. He was schooled at Campion School, Mumbai and graduated from Jai Hind College. While in college he took part in many fashion shows and plays. He also won an All India Talent Hunt organized by Stardust. He was trained as an actor at the Stardust Academy by Nari Hira of Magna Publications, where he was trained by Namit Kishore Kapoor, dance by Shakur and voice training by Ustad Akhtar Ali Khan.

Gautham made his debut with role as Tez in Ankush Bhatt's Bhindi Bazaar Inc., 2011, alongside Kay Kay Menon, Piyush Mishra, Pavan Malhotra, Prashant Narayanan & Deepti Naval. He has done various advertisements for the brands like Colgate, Reynolds, Asian Paints and Bristol Cigarettes.

== Filmography ==
Year	Film	Role
2011	Bhindi Bazaar	Tezz/Tabrez
