= P. D. Kode =

Pramod Dattaram Kode (born 13 February 1953) usually referred to as PD Kode, is a retired Additional Judge of Bombay High Court. Prior to that, he was the designated judge of the Terrorist and Disruptive Activities (Prevention) Act court that dealt with the 1993 Bombay Bombings case. He is noted for not missing court sessions when he broke his arm after slipping in his bathroom, nor when his parents died. Kode is a Hindi film enthusiast and is fond of computer games.

He was elevated to the Bombay High Court as an Additional Judge on 10 February 2009.

He made his movie debut in the Shailendra Pandey's Hindi feature film, JD, based on a journalist's life.
