= The Past (2018 film) =

- Film poster
- Directed by: Gagan Puri
- Written by: Sandip v Rale
- Produced by: Jaspal Singh; Nitesh Kumar
- Starring: Vedita Pratap Singh; Samiksha Bhatt; Yuvraaj Parashar; Rajesh Sharma
- Cinematography: Soni Singh
- Edited by: Subham Srivastav
- Music by: mannan munjal (also Soundtrack album)
- Production company: Peacock Motion Filmz
- Distributed by: N M Entertainment
- Release date: 11 May 2018
- Running time: 122 minutes
- Country: India
- Language: Hindi

The Past is a 2018 Indian horror thriller film directed by Gagan Puri, produced by Jaspal Singh and Nitesh Kumar under Peacock Motion Filmz banner, written by Sandip V Rale and starring Vedita Pratap Singh, Samiksha Bhatt, Yuvraaj Parashar, and Rajesh Sharma in lead roles.

== Plot ==
The film centers on Simran, a novelist, who gets a call from Yuvraaj, the sole owner of a publishing house (Nexus Publication), asking Simran to write his biography. Simran accepts his offer and goes to his bungalow in Lonavala to write his biography along with her sister, Alia. Shortly after their arrival, the sisters start experiencing paranormal activities, growing more severe over time. Simran gets possessed by a spirit after seeing her sister in trauma, so Alia calls Simran's best friend, Disha. By the time Disha reaches the bungalow, Simran is fully possessed. In order to save her from the spirit, Disha calls Jane, a psychic, who comes to the bungalow to save Simran from the evil spirit. Jane discovers that the spirit is of Sanjana, Yuvraj's wife, who went missing 5 years back as per the caretaker of the bungalow. Upon enquiring further with the possessed body of Simran, Sanjana tells her story.

Sanjana was married to Yuvraj and loved him deeply. However, she did not get the love she had expected from Yuvraj. Yuvraj is not interested in Sanjana. Eventually, Sanjana discovers that Yuvraj is gay and is involved with guys and not interested in her. After a lot of failed attempts to persuade Yuvraj to stop involving into guys, she commits suicide leaving a note behind.

Unable to control the situation and the spirit, Jane is forced to call her senior, Guruji, to save Simran from the spirit, which reveals more secrets of the film. It is revealed that Yuvraj knew about Sanjana's suicide. Fearing the blame of suicide on himself as per the suicide note, Yuvraj decides to hide the corpse of Sanjana into basement. After enormous efforts by Guruji and Jane, the spirit of Sanjana evicts from Simran's body. Yuvraj realizes his fault and decides to stay in the bungalow with Sanjana's memories.

== Cast ==
- Vedita Pratap Singh as Simran
- Samiksha Bhatt as Ghost / Sanjana
- Yuvraaj Parashar as Yuvraj
- Rajesh Sharma as guruji
- Jeet Raidutt as Manav
- Jaya Virlley
- Sonia Albizur as psychic
