= Trish Thuy Trang =

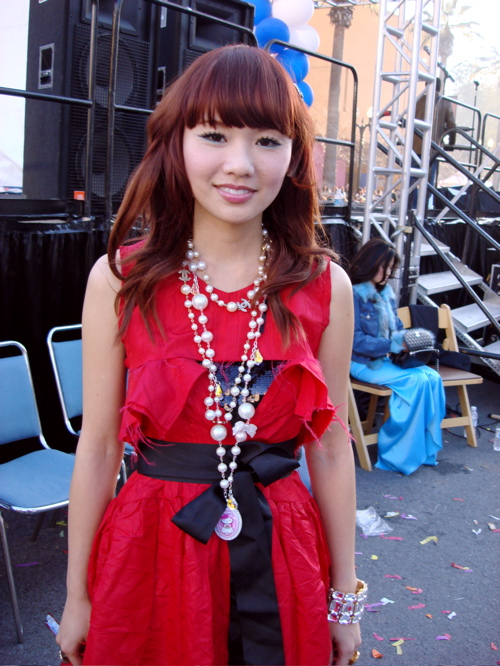
- Trang at a Tết event in 2008

Background information
- Born: Nguyễn Thùy Trang; December 15, 1980 (age 45); Ho Chi Minh City, Vietnam
- Origin: Norco, California, U.S.
- Genres: Pop, techno, dance
- Occupations: Singer, songwriter
- Labels: Asia Entertainment, Triple T Productions
- Website: http://www.trishttrang.com/

Nguyễn Thùy Trang (born December 15, 1980), known by her stage name Trish Thuy Trang, is a Vietnamese American singer and songwriter.

Friends encouraged Trang to send a demo to Asia Entertainment and she signed with Asia Entertainment, eventually being cited as one of their biggest stars in 2006.
