= Ek Kahani Julie Ki =

2016 film directed by Aziz Zee

- Theatrical release poster
- Directed by: Aziz Zee
- Written by: Arsh Rana
- Produced by: Chetna Entertainments
- Starring: Rakhi Sawant; Jimmy Sharma; Amit Mehra
- Cinematography: Mohamed Jaffer
- Edited by: Amitava Chakraborty
- Music by: Deepak Agrawal; Dj Sheizwood
- Production company: Chetna Entertainment
- Release date: 9 September 2016
- Running time: 140 minutes
- Country: India
- Language: Hindi

Ek Kahani Julie Ki (transl. A story of Julie) is a Hindi thriller film directed by Aziz Zee and produced by Chetna Sharma under the banner of Chetna Entertainments. The film stars Rakhi Sawant Amit Mehra and Jimmy Sharma in the lead roles. The movie is set in the Indian film industry. The film was released on 9 September 2016. Its total box office collection was ₹120 million (equivalent to ₹190 million or US$2.0 million in 2026).

== Cast ==
- Rakhi Sawant as Julie
- Jimmy Sharma as DK Bhaskar
- Amit Mehra as Nikhil Kapoor
- Saniya Pannu as Mahi Srivastav
- Avadh Sharma as Niketan Kapoor
- Aakriti Nagpal as Neena
- Adi Irani
- Rajesh Khera

== Soundtrack ==
The Music was composed By DJ Sheizwood and Deepak Agrawal composed the song "Fanari" and songs were produced by Zee Music Company.

Ek Kahani Julie Ki

Soundtrack album by Dj Sheizwood
- Released: 12 August 2016
- Recorded: 2016
- Genre: Soundtrack
- Length: 20:47
- Label: Zee Music Company
- Producer: Dj Sheizwood

Track list
No.	Title	Lyrics	Singer(s)	Length
1.	"O Re Piya"	Taufique Palvi	Armaan Malik	6:00
2.	"Saiyaan Ve"	Taufique Palvi	Javed Ali, Shabab Sabri, Shehzad Ali, Naman Shastri	4:27
3.	"Fannari"	Kumar Juneja, Deepak Agrawal	Mamta Sharma, Amit Gupta	3:14
4.	"Julie (Title)"	Arsh Rana	Usha Uthup	5:01
5.	"Julie (Remix)"	Arsh Rana	Usha Uthup	2:05
Total length:				20:47
