= Hemant Madhukar =

Indian film director and writer (born 1977)

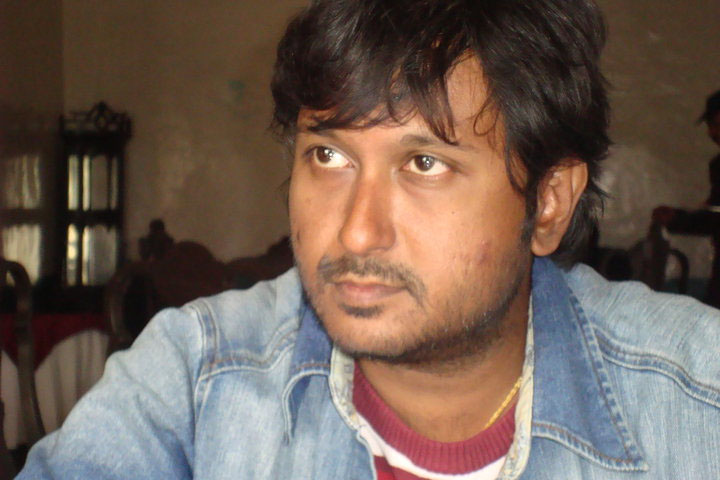
- Born: 15 August 1977 (age 48); Chennai, Tamil Nadu, India
- Occupations: Filmmaker, writer
- Years active: 2025—present
- Spouse: Tripta Madhukar

Hemant Madhukar (born 15 August 1977) is an Indian film director and writer. He is the son of the late veteran film maker, Shri K Baburao. Hemant Madhukar also known as Hemanth Madhukar he made his first Bollywood film A Flat (Super natural thriller)as writer & director produced by Anjum Rizvi film Co by Anjum Rizvi(2010).Jimmy Shergill and Sanjay Suri are the main cast. The film shot in super 35 film format. The film received good acclaim for its unique content and visuals. In 2011 he wrote and directed a Telugu film Vastadu Na Raju (2011) produced by M Mohan Babu and Vishnu Manchu. It starred Vishnu Manchu Tapsi Pannu and Prakashraj. The film was the first Telugu film shot on Digital format RED one camera. His Hindi film Mumbai 125 KM was shot entirely in 3D side by side format. His recent film Nishabdham was an international crossover film shot entirely in Hollywood. Michael Madison played an antagonist. R Madhavan Anushka Shetty and Anjali are in the cast.

== Filmography ==
Year	Film	Director	Writer	Producer	Language	Notes
2010	A Flat	Yes	Yes	No	Hindi	
2011	Vastadu Naa Raju	Yes	Yes	No	Telugu	
2014	Mumbai 125 KM	Yes	Story	Yes	Hindi	
2020	Nishabdham; Silence	Yes	Story	No	Telugu; Tamil	

=== Television ===
- Lux Dreamgirl Gemini TV (2011) - Judge

|2023||SARVAM SHAKTI MAYAM ||Hindi
Hindi WEB Series |- |}

== Controversy ==
Madhukar was in headlines for his intimacy with Mumbai 125 KM lead actress, Veena Malik.
