= Silk Sakkath Hot =

- Theatrical release poster
- Directed by: Trishul
- Written by: Trishul
- Produced by: Venkatappa
- Starring: Veena Malik; Akshay; Sana; Sadhu Kokila
- Cinematography: Jai Anand
- Edited by: S. K. Nagendra Urs
- Music by: Jassie Gift
- Release date: 2 August 2013
- Running time: 135 minutes
- Country: India
- Language: Kannada

Silk Sakkath Hot (transl. Silk, very hot) is a 2013 Indian Kannada-language biographical film written and directed by Trishul. The film was produced by Venkatappa and stars Veena Malik, making her debut in South India, in the lead role. The supporting cast consists of Akshay, Sana, Anitha Bhat and Srinivasa Murthy. Jassie Gift composed the music.

The film portrays the story of an aspiring actress who is ready to go to any extent to make it big in the cinema industry. It was inspired by the life of Silk Smitha, a South Indian actress noted for her erotic roles. Silk Sakkath Hot released to mixed reviews and was financially successful. It was also film was dubbed in Tamil as Kick and in Telugu as Red Mirchi.

== Cast ==
- Veena Malik as Silk
- Akshay as Shiva
- Sana as Ammani
- Anitha Bhat as Ragini
- Srinivasa Murthy
- Avinash
- Sadhu Kokila
- Achyuth Kumar
- Stephanie Siriwardhana as item number

== Production ==
The film was originally titled Dirty Picture before it was changed to Silk Sakkath Hot Maga and shortened to Silk Sakkath Hot.

== Soundtrack ==
Silk Sakkath Maga

Soundtrack album by Jassie Gift
- Released: February 2013
- Genre: Feature film soundtrack

Jassie Gift has composed 5 songs to the lyrics of Kaviraj.

No.	Title	Singer(s)	Length
1.	"Undadi Gundamma"	Suchitra
2.	"Punaha Punaha"	Javed Ali, Sadhana Sargam
3.	"Bhaayi Haakubaa"	Jassie Gift, Malgudi Subha
4.	"Mutthanu Kodu"	Jassie Gift, Rajalakshmi
5.	"Mattina Kannalle"	Mamta Sharma

== Release ==
Silk Sakkath Hot was reported to have housefull theaters.

=== Critical reception ===
A critic from The Times of India wrote that "A Veena Malik show all the way. Be it a sentimental or a bold and beautiful sequence, Veena scores over others with excellent portrayal of her character".
