= Dunno Y... Na Jaane Kyon =

- Movie poster
- Directed by: Sanjay Sharma
- Written by: Kapil Sharma
- Produced by: Rajkumari Satyaprakash
- Starring: Kapil Sharma; Yuvraaj Parashar
- Cinematography: Basheer Ali
- Edited by: Sanjay Sharma
- Music by: Nikhil Kamat
- Production company: Movies Masti Magic Studios
- Release dates: 22 September 2010 (I View Festival); 12 November 2010 (India)
- Country: India
- Languages: English; Hindi

Dunno Y ... Na Jaane Kyon (transl. Don't know why) is a 2010 bilingual Indian film. It was directed by Sanjay Sharma and written by Kapil Sharma, who also played the lead. It premiered in April 2010 at India's first mainstream gay film festival, the Kashish Mumbai International Queer Film Festival.

The film had its North American premiere at the I View Film Festival in New York City and was screened at the Sydney Film Festival, the Indian Film Festival of London (IFFL) and Filmfest homochrom in Germany. Dunno Y... Na Jaane Kyon was released in theatres in Austria, Italy and Switzerland in September 2010.

The film received the Best Sensitive Award at the Kashish Queer International film festival 2010 and the Viewer Choice Award at the Satrang Film Festival of Sydney 2010. It also won the Best Film awards at the Poland Film Festival 2014, Naples Italy 2014, and the Nasik International Film Festival 2014. Lead actors, Yuvraaj Parashar and Kapil Sharma won Best Actor awards at Out View Film Festival Greece 2012. The film was screened at 17 international film festivals. A sequel has also been made starring Zeenat Aman, Kapil Sharma and Yuvraaj Parashar.

== Cast ==
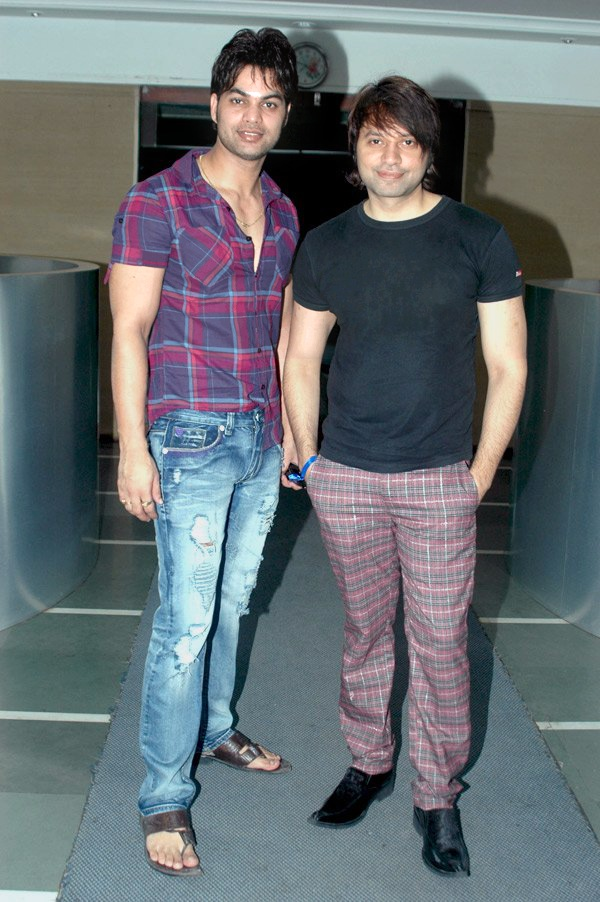
Main actors Yuvraaj Parashar and Kapil Sharma at a special screening of the film

- Zeenat Aman as Nazneen Ali Mirza
- Kapil Sharma as Aryan
- Kabir Bedi
- Hazel Croney
- Helen
- Mahabanoo Mody-Kotwal
- Yuvraaj Parashar as Ashley
- Asha Sachdev
- Parikshat Sahni
- Rituparna Sengupta
- Aryan Vaid
- Maradona Rebello as Sam

== Music ==
The film's music is composed by Nikhil Kamat. The theme song "Pal Mein Rishte Badal Jaate Hain" is performed by Lata Mangeshkar. The film also features Zeenat Aman performing the song "Aap Jaisa Koi" from her film Qurbani and the song "Chura Liya Hai Tumne" from Yaadon Ki Baraat.

- "Atariyan Main" - Rekha Rao
- "Dabi Dabi Khwahishein" (duet) - Shaan and Shreya Ghoshal
- "Dabi Dabi Khwahishein (male)" - Shaan
- "Dabi Dabi Khwahishein (version 2)" - Shaan, Farhad Bhiwandiwala and Shreya Ghoshal
- "Dunno Y Na Jaane Kyon (male)" - Shaan
- "Dunno Y Na Jaane Kyon (female)" - Lata Mangeshkar
- "Helen Theme" - N/A
- "Jenny/Ashley in Love" - N/A
- "Saiyan Saiyan" - Farhad Bhiwandiwala, Nikhil
- "Mumbai Meri Hain" - Anee Chatterjee
- "Zeenat Aman (sad theme)" - N/A

== Controversy ==
The real life parents of Yuvraaj Parashar, one of two lead characters, have initiated legal action to disown him because of the shame arising from the film, claiming to "not want to see his face even in death". This came despite Parashar winning acclaim from Deputy Chief Minister of Maharashtra Chhagan Bhujbal for his sensitive portrayal of gay men.

Furthermore, the sex scene between Parashar and Kapil Sharma is facing censorship. Sharma said: "Why should the censors be scandalised if two men are kissing and making love? The ones in my film are very aesthetic. And so what if it’s two men making love? Love is love regardless of gender."
