= JD (film) =

- JD
- जेडी
- Directed by: Shailendra Pandey
- Screenplay by: Kumar Vijay, Shailendra Pandey
- Story by: Shailendra Pandey
- Produced by: Shailendra Pandey, Anju Pandey
- Starring: Lalit Bisht; Vedita Pratap Singh; Govind Namdev; Aman Verma
- Cinematography: Kapil Gautam, Rajesh Mishra, Manish Pandit
- Edited by: R. Ghadi
- Music by: Jaan Nissar Lone, Ganesh Pandey; score: Monty Sharma
- Production company: Shailendra Pandey Films
- Distributed by: Shailendra Pandey Films
- Release date: 22 September 2017
- Running time: 127.45 minutes
- Country: India
- Language: Hindi

JD (Hindi: जेडी) is an Indian Hindi-language legal drama film written, directed by Shailendra Pandey and produced by Anju Pandey & Shailendra Pandey. The film is based on the life of an Indian journalist. The news portal "First Post" compared the story to Tarun Tejpal, editor-in-chief, involved in a Tehelka Magazine sexual assault case. The film was released on 22 September 2017. Film JD is available on Prime Video, Jio Cinema and Airtel Xstream.

== Real life people ==
Several actors in the film play roles that mimic their real-life jobs, including:

- Retired Justice PD Kode (playing a judge)
- Politician Amar Singh (playing a politician)
- Rameshwar Gite (playing an advocate)
- Santosh Singh (playing businessman)
- Tanu Sharma (playing a TV anchor)
- Sharat Pradhan, Ratanmani Lal, Sunanda Dikshit, and Subhash Sirke (playing editors)
- Ruhani (playing an air hostess)

The film includes a song in which real Nautanki dancers, musicians, and singers from Kanpur perform.

== Cast ==
- Govind Namdev as Divakar Verma
- Aman Verma as Lawyer
- Vedita Pratap Singh as Noor
- Lalit Bisht as Jai Dwivedi aka JD
- Rina Charaniya
- Arvind Gaur
- Surya Mohan Kulsherstha
- Shwetank Pandey
- Jasveer Kaur as special appearance in the item number "Kamariya Pe Lattu"

== Soundtrack ==
There are six songs in the film. The lyrics were written by Kumar Vijay and Sahil Fatehpuri. Sandip Soparrkar choreographed two songs.The music was composed by Ganesh Pandey and Jaan Nissar Lone, and was released by Zee Music Company.

JD

Soundtrack album by Ganesh Pandey Jaan Nissar Lone
- Released: 7 Sep 2017
- Recorded: 2017
- Genre: Soundtrack
- Length: 25:56
- Label: Zee Music Company
- Producers: Shailendra Pandey; Anju Pandey

Track list
No.	Title	Lyrics	Music	Singer(s)	Length
1.	"Naya Safar Aur Nai Kahani"	Kumar Vijay	Ganesh Pandey	Raja Hasan	3:06
2.	"Sawan Ban Aay Gayo Badra"	Kumar Vijay	Ganesh Pandey	Altamash Faridi, Desh Gaurav, Pratiksha Vashishth	3:56
3.	"Whiskey Soda"	Sahil Fatehpuri	Jaan Nisar Lone	Rani Hazarika, Seher Pandit	4:21
4.	"Kamariya Pe Lattu"	Kumar Vijay	Ganesh Pandey	Mamta Sharma,	4:18
5.	"Mit Gaya Aashiyan"	Kumar Vijay	Ganesh Pandey	Avid Jamal	5:16
6.	"Utar Bichhoo Jhanjhro"	Traditional	Folk	Poonam, Munni	4:59
Total length:					25:56

== Accolades ==
Award Ceremony	Category	Recipient	Result	Ref.(s)
10th Mirchi Music Awards	Upcoming Lyricist of The Year	Kumar Vijay - "Sawan Ban Aay Gayo Badra"	Nominated	
