= Rakhi Sawant =

Indian media personality and dancer (born 1978)

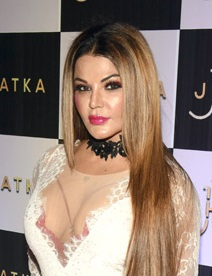
- Sawant in 2019
- Born: Neeru Bheda; 25 November 1978 (age 47); Mumbai, Maharashtra, India
- Other name: Fatima Rakhi Sawant
- Occupations: Media personality; dancer; actress; politician
- Years active: 1997–present
- Works: Full list
- Political party: Republican Party of India (A) (since 2014)
- Other political affiliations: Rashtriya Aam Party (2014)
- Spouses: Ritesh Singh (m. 2019; div. 2022); Adil Khan Durrani (m. 2022; sep. 2023)

President of Women's Wing of Republican Party of India (Athawale)
- In office 2014–2017
- Succeeded by: Seema Athawale

Rakhi Sawant (born Neeru Bheda; 25 November 1978) is an Indian media personality, actress, dancer and politician. She has performed item numbers predominantly in Hindi films. Her notable film appearances have been in Chura Liyaa Hai Tumne (2003), Masti (2004), Main Hoon Na (2004), Krazzy 4 (2008), and Dil Bole Hadippa! (2008).

Sawant was a contestant on the first season of the reality television series Bigg Boss 1 (2006) and a challenger and finalist in Bigg Boss 14 (2020). Sawant has established herself as a sex symbol and has gained attention in the media for her controversial statements and lifestyle.

== Early life and family ==
Rakhi Sawant was born as Neeru Bheda on 25 November 1978 to Jaya Bheda in Mumbai. After Jaya married Anand Sawant, a police constable at Worli Police Station, Rakhi adopted the surname of her step-father, Anand Sawant. Her brother is named Rakesh Sawant, and she also has a sister named Usha Sawant.

Sawant married to businessman Ritesh Singh in 2019. The couple appeared together on Bigg Boss 15 before announcing their separation in February 2022. In 2022, Sawant married Adil Khan Durrani in a nikah ceremony followed by a court marriage, which was publicly disclosed in January 2023. Following her marriage to Durrani, Sawant announced that she had embraced Islam and adopted the name Fatima. The couple later separated, after which Sawant filed police complaints against Durrani alleging domestic violence and other offences.

== Film and television career ==
Rakhi Sawant made her film debut in the 1997 film Agnichakra under the name Ruhi Sawant. She went on to change her name to Rakhi Sawant and then took other small roles and dance numbers in Bollywood films Joru Ka Ghulam, Jis Desh Mein Ganga Rehta Hain, and Yeh Raaste Hain Pyaar Ke.

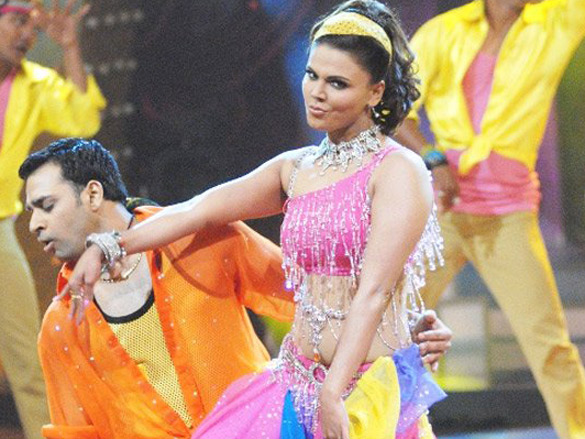
Rakhi Sawant performing alongside Abhishek Avasthi on Nach Baliye in Madhuri Dixit's famous getup

In 2003, she auditioned for an item number in the Bollywood film Chura Liyaa Hai Tumne. She auditioned about four times before being selected for her breakthrough item number, "Mohabbat Hai Mirchi", composed by Himesh Reshammiya. Sawant acted in small roles in films including Masti and Main Hoon Na.

In 2004, she appeared in the music video "Pardesiya", from the album D.J. Hot Remix - Vol 3.

In June 2006, Mika Singh attempted to kiss her at his birthday party, which caused a media controversy. A few months later, she appeared in the first season of the reality show Bigg Boss. She got evicted in week 4 but later made a re-entry. She was among the top four finalists but got evicted days before the grand finale (24 January 2007, Day 84). In 2007, Rakhi made her singing debut in the album Super Girl launched by Venus Records & Tapes Pvt. Ltd. She later participated in the dance reality show Nach Baliye with Abhishek Avasthi and emerged as the first runner up. In 2008, Sawant appeared in the film Krazzy 4 for the item song "Dekhta Hai Tu Kya". In 2009, Sawant launched the reality show Rakhi Ka Swayamwar in which she planned to select her future husband by the ancient ritual of Swayamvar. On 2 August 2009, she chose her life partner, a contestant from Toronto, Canada, Elesh Parujanwala. However, several months later, Sawant announced that the couple had separated due to irreconcilable differences. After separation, she revealed in an interview that she got engaged to Elesh Parujanwala for money.

In 2010, Rakhi hosted a talk show Rakhi Ka Insaaf which aired on Imagine TV. The show saw a controversy after the death of a participant after Rakhi had called him impotent. In 2011, she participated in Sony TV's Maa Exchange along with mother Jaya Sawant.

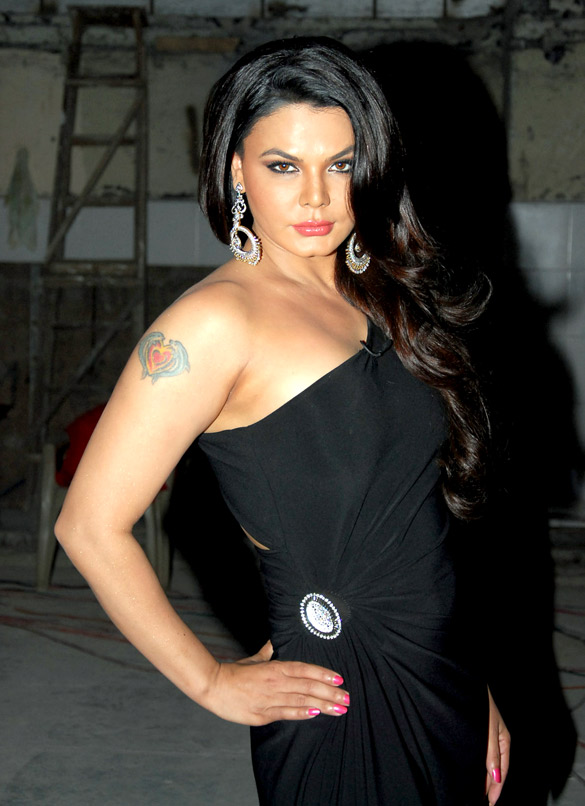
Sawant in 2012

Often appearing in reality shows as a host, judge or participant, Sawant is a regular stage performer. In 2012, she did a comedy act with Shahrukh Khan and Ranbir Kapoor at the 57th Filmfare Awards and entry dance performance in 2015 with Ranveer Singh and Arjun Kapoor in Malaysia.

In 2013, she participated in Welcome – Baazi Mehmaan Nawazi Ki along with Anchal Sabharwal, Sangram Singh, Chetan Hansraj and Madhura Naik. The show aired on Life OK. She later was a contestant on Box Cricket League.

Sawant later played the leading role in thriller film Ek Kahani Julie Ki, and was seen in a cameo appearance in comedy fiction television series Bhaag Bakool Bhaag.

From 2020 to 2021, Sawant appeared as a challenger in Bigg Boss 14. She emerged as a finalist but decided to walk out, opting for the cash prize of 14 lakhs.

Rakhi also participated in the fourth season of Bigg Boss Marathi as a wild card contestant and reached the finale, before deciding to walk-out with 10 lakhs, becoming the 4th Runner-Up of the show.

== Political career ==
On 26 March 2014, she announced her plans to contest 2014 Lok Sabha elections from Mumbai North-West as an independent candidate. On 28 March, she founded the Rashtriya Aam Party (RAP). The party has no symbol assigned by the election commission. However, Sawant said that she's expecting it to be a "green chilli", which she feels resembles her personality. The party's office bearers and fundraisers are local businessmen from Oshiwara.

She received only 15 votes from the Mumbai North-West Constituency and lost her deposit.

Sawant resigned from the Rashtriya Aam Party and joined the RPI (Athawale) party in June 2014 and expressed her desire to work for dalits. Rakhi served as the party's state vice-president and president of the women's wing. She campaigned for the party in the 2016 Assam and 2017 Uttar Pradesh Assembly elections.

== Personal life ==
In 2019, Sawant married an NRI man named Ritesh, which ended in divorce in early 2022. In May 2022, she married Adil Khan Durrani. They separated in February 2023.

In November 2018, during The Great Khali's Continental Wrestling Entertainment promotion, American female wrestler Rebel got involved in a dance battle against Sawant, during which Rebel grabbed her in a bear hug and threw her on her back. It injured Sawant's back and she fell unconscious. She was taken to a nearby hospital.

On 4 April 2017, she appeared in the Ludhiana court wearing a burqa for making objectionable remarks against Sage Valmiki, at which time she was accompanied by Indian National Congress, National co-ordinator Rahul Jogi (born on 21 August 1990), due to which she was severely criticized.

Sawant converted to Christianity in 2009. She later converted to Islam after marrying her boyfriend Adil Durrani. However, Adil denied the marriage at first, but soon, after some weeks, he accepted his marriage with Rakhi.

Sawant performed her first Umrah at Mecca in 2023. She made her second Umrah at Mecca in 2025. She has also sponsored Umrah trips for people and engaged in social upliftment initiatives in the Middle East.

== Filmography ==
=== Acting ===
| Year | Film | Role | Notes |
|---|---|---|---|
| 1997 | Agnichakra | Ruhi Sawant | |
| 1999 | Dil Ka Sauda | Rambha | |
| 1999 | Chudail No. 1 | | |
| 2000 | Kurukshetra | Geeta | |
| 2000 | Joru Ka Ghulam | Chandni | |
| 2000 | Jis Desh Mein Ganga Rehta Hain | | |
| 2001 | Ehsaas: The Feeling | Maria | |
| 2001 | 6 Teens | Nandini | Telugu film |
| 2002 | Badmaash No.1 | | |
| 2002 | Gautam Govinda | | |
| 2002 | Na Tum Jaano Na Hum | Disco Shanti | |
| 2003 | Dum | Maid | |
| 2003 | Chura Liyaa Hai Tumne | Sheena | |
| 2003 | Om | Celina | |
| 2003 | Bad Boys | | |
| 2003 | 2 October | | |
| 2003 | Patth | | |
| 2003 | Waah! Tera Kya Kehna | Dancer | |
| 2004 | Gambeeram | | |
| 2004 | Paisa Vasool | Dilkhush | |
| 2004 | Masti | Ms. Saxena | |
| 2004 | Main Hoon Na | Mini | |
| 2004 | Saatchya Aat Gharat | | |
| 2005 | Mumbai Xpress | | |
| 2005 | Khamoshh... Khauff Ki Raat | Kashmira | |
| 2007 | Shootout at Lokhandwala | Pooja Bedi | |
| 2007 | Journey Bombay to Goa: Laughter Unlimited | Deepa Kutti | |
| 2007 | Buddha Mar Gaya | Kim / Vishkanya | |
| 2008 | Gumnaam – The Mystery | Ria's friend | |
| 2008 | Dhoom Dadakka | Rambha | |
| 2009 | Dil Bole Hadippa! | Shanno Amritsari | |
| 2010 | Mungilal Rocks | | |
| 2011 | Mere Brother Ki Dulhan | Herself (voice) | |
| 2015 | Mumbai Can Dance Saala | | |
| 2016 | Ek Kahani Julie Ki | Julie | |
| 2019 | Upeksha | | |
| 2023 | Mast Mein Rehne Ka | Sana Bimli | |

=== Dance numbers ===
| Year | Film | Song | Notes |
|---|---|---|---|
| 2000 | En Sakhiye | | |
| 2001 | Yeh Raaste Hain Pyaar Ke | "Bam Bhole Bam Bhole" | |
| 2003 | Aanch | "Hai Re Umariya 16 baras Ki" | |
| 2004 | Saatchya Aat Gharat | "Hil Pori Hila" | |
| 2004 | Paisa Vasool | "Maine Saiyan Ki Demand" | |
| 2005 | Ek Khiladi Ek Haseena | "Ankhiya Na Maar Mere Yaar Mundiya" | |
| 2005 | The Powerful Man | "Chikna Badan" | |
| 2006 | Hot Money | "Daulat Hai Karishma" | |
| 2006 | Malamaal Weekly | "Kismat Se Chalti Hai" | |
| 2007 | Geleya | "Nanna Stylu Berene" | |
| 2008 | Krazzy 4 | "Dekhta Hai Tu Kya" | |
| 2008 | 1920 | "Jab Das Jaaye Bichua" | |
| 2008 | Mudrank – The Stamp | "Mohabbat Kya Hoti Hain" | |
| 2009 | Muthirai | "Night Is Still Young" | |
| 2009 | Drona | "Sayya Re Sayya Re" | |
| 2010 | Horn 'Ok' Pleassss | "Nathani Utaro" | |
| 2010 | Marega Salaa | "Sehra Sehra Tujhpe Dil" | |
| 2011 | Gahraee | "Meri Jawani AK47" | |
| 2011 | Loot | "Jawani Ki Bank Loot Le" | |
| 2012 | Rakhtbeej | "Latto Ghuma Re Chora" | |
| 2012 | Om Shanti | "Chonnara Dil Thame Dekhle Rakhi" | |
| 2012 | Valentine's Night | "Gaye Re Gaye Saand Paani Mein" | |
| 2014 | Katta Tanal Dupatta Par | "Peela Jawaniya Ke Juice" | |
| 2017 | God Father | "Chuti Kholila Sampu Basiba" | |
| 2019 | Sabse Bada Champion | "Laga Navratan Tel" | |

=== Television ===
| Year | Title | Role |
|---|---|---|
| 2003 | Carry On Shekhar | |
| 2006 | Jeena Isi Ka Naam Hai | |
| 2006−2007 | Bigg Boss 1 | Evicted (4th place) |
| 2007 | Let's Talk... | |
| 2007 | Aap Ki Adalat | Herself |
| 2007 | Baa Bahoo Aur Baby | |
| 2007 | Koffee with Karan | Herself |
| 2007 | Comedy Ka Badsshah — Hasega India | Judge alongside Raju Srivastav |
| 2007 | Nach Baliye 3 | Runner-up |
| 2008 | Yeh Hai Jalwa | Winner |
| 2008 | The Rakhi Sawant Showz | Host |
| 2008 | Chota Packet Bada Dhamaka | Judge |
| 2008 | Jalwa Four 2 Ka 1 | Contestant |
| 2008 | Bigg Boss 2 | |
| 2008 | 10 Ka Dum | |
| 2009 | Arre Deewano Mujhe Pehchano | Contestant |
| 2009 | Rakhi Ka Swayamwar | Leading Lady |
| 2009 | Pati, Patni Aur Woh | Participant with Elesh Parujanwala |
| 2009 | Nach Baliye 4 | |
| 2009−2011 | Boogie Woogie | |
| 2009 | Lux Perfect Bride | |
| 2010 | Zara Nachke Dikha 2 | Winner |
| 2010 | Rakhi ka Insaaf | Host |
| 2010 | Bigg Boss 4 | |
| 2010 | Jubilee Comedy Circus | Winner |
| 2011 | Maa Exchange | Participant along with Jaya Sawant |
| 2011 | Bigg Toss | Contestant |
| 2011 | Ghazab Desh Ki Ajab Kahaaniyan | Host |
| 2011 | Comedy Circus 3 Ka Tadka | |
| 2011 | Ratan Ka Rishta | |
| 2011 | Sheela, Shagun and Meenakshi | |
| 2011 | Shaadi 3 Crore Ki | |
| 2012 | Bigg Boss 5 | |
| 2012 | All Most Famous | |
| 2012 | Jhalak Dikhhla Jaa 5 | |
| 2012 | Bigg Boss 6 | |
| 2012 | Movers & Shakers Masala Markey | |
| 2013 | Welcome - Baazi Mehmaan-Nawaazi ki | Weekly contestant |
| 2013 | Comedy Circus Ke Mahabali | Contestant |
| 2014 | Box Cricket League - Season 1 | Contestant |
| 2014 | Comedy Nights with Kapil | |
| 2015 | Comedy Classes | |
| 2015 | Chidiya Ghar | |
| 2016 | Comedy Nights Bachao | |
| 2017 | Bhaag Bakool Bhaag | Twinkle Maa |
| 2018 | Box Cricket League - Season 3 | Contestant |
| 2018 | Juzzbaatt - Namkeen Se Sangeen Tak | Guest (along with Arshi Khan) |
| 2019 | Manmohini | Chakua Chudail |
| 2019 | Khatra Khatra Khatra | Guest |
| 2019 | Box Cricket League - Season 4 | Host |
| 2019 | Kanala Khada | Guest |
| 2020−2021 | Bigg Boss 14 | Challenger, 4th runner-up |
| 2021 | Maddam Sir | Begum Chorni |
| 2021 | Hero – Gayab Mode On | Begum Chorni |
| 2021 | Wagle Ki Duniya – Nayi Peedhi Naye Kissey | Begum Chorni |
| 2021 | Tera Yaar Hoon Main | Begum Chorni |
| 2021 | Ziddi Dil Maane Na | Begum Chorni |
| 2021 | Indian Idol 12 | Guest |
| 2021 | Bigg Boss OTT | Guest |
| 2021 | Bigg Boss 15 | Guest |
| 2021−2022 | Bigg Boss 15 | Wildcard entrant |
| 2022−2023 | Bigg Boss Marathi 4 | Challenger, 4th runner-up |
| 2024 | Bigg Boss Marathi 5 | Guest |
| 2024−2026 | India's Got Latent | Guest judge |
| 2025 | Reality Ranis of the Jungle | Guest |
| 2026 | Bigg Boss Marathi 6 | Wildcard entrant Evicted on Day 91 (7th Place) |

=== Music videos ===
| Year | Song | Album | Language | Notes |
|---|---|---|---|---|
| 2003 | Jhoomka Gira Re Remix | Sweet Honey Mix | Hindi | |
| 2004 | "Pardesiya Yeh Sach Hai Piya Remix" | Miss Spicy Mix | Hindi | |
| 2004 | Buddha Mil Gaya | Pin Up Doll | Hindi | |
| 2005 | Honthon Mein Aisi Baat | Pardesia 2 | Hindi | |
| 2007 | "Haadsa" | Haadsaa The Groovy Mix | Hindi | |
| 2008 | "Tu Dissda" | Nigght Birds - Say Tu Dissda | Hindi | |
| 2009 | "Bhoot" | Jhagde | Hindi | |
| 2010 | "Jhagde" | Jhagde | Hindi | |
| 2019 | "Chappan Churi" | Chappan Chur | Hindi | |
| 2021 | "Dream Mein Entry" Dance Cover | "Dream Mein Entry" Dance Cover | Hindi | |
| 2021 | "Lockdown" | Lockdown | Hindi | |
| 2025 | "Zaroorat" | | Hindi | |
