= Dunno Y2... Life Is a Moment =

Dunno Y2... Life is a Moment
- Directed by: Tonje Gjevjon; Sanjay Sharma
- Produced by: Yuvraaj Parashar and Edith Roth Gjevjon Co Producer = Shauky Gulamani
- Starring: Zeenat Aman; Kapil Sharma; Yuvraaj Parashar; Meera; Sadia Khan; Edith Gjevjon; Tonje Gjevjon; Nasrullah Qureshi
- Music by: Nikhil Kamat; Tonje Gjevjon; Bendik Gjevjon
- Production companies: Movies Masti Magic Studios; Blylaget Film; Shantketan Films
- Release date: 18 September 2015
- Running time: 100 minutes
- Countries: India; Norway
- Languages: Hindi, English, Norwegian
- Box office: India

Dunno Y2 ... Life Is A Moment is a 2015 Indian-Norwegian romantic drama film, directed by Tonje Gjevjon and Sanjay Sharma, starring Zeenat Aman, Kapil Sharma, Yuvraaj Parashar, Meera and Sadia Khan. It is the sequel to the 2010 award-winning film Dunno Y... Na Jaane Kyon. The film explores a romantic and intimate relationship between two men of different nationalities, one Indian and one Pakistani. Dunno Y2 ... Life Is A Moment was released in India on 18 September 2015. Lead actors Kapil Sharma and Yuvraaj Parashar travelled to attend the international premieres of the film at the 2015 Filmfest homochrom in Cologne, Germany, and the closing night screening at Barcelona International Gay and Lesbian Film Festival in Spain, 2015 and Poland LGBT Film Festival 2016. May 2016 at Kashish Queer international film festival, June 2016 at My true colors New York International film Festival.. Dunno Y2 got best Film 1st runner up award at 6th DGLFF 2016 Durban South Africa Film Festival

== Cast ==
- Kapil Sharma as Aryan
- Yuvraaj Parashar as Ashley
- Zeenat Aman as Nazneen
- Sadia Khan as Aisha
- Meera as Zahra
- Edith Roth Gjevjon as Edith
- Tonje Gjevjon as Tonje

== Plot ==
The film follows a gay relationship between two young men: Aryan, from Pakistan and Ashley, from India. They meet in a sauna for men in Norway just a few days before Aryan is about to have his engagement party with his girlfriend Aisha. Through Aryan and Ashley's relationship, the viewer sees how humor, love and art can overcome the political and cultural differences between Norway, India and Pakistan.

== Music ==
Nikhil Kamath wrote the score. The singers on the soundtrack includes Lata Mangeshkar and Salma Agha, who performed the song "Jeena Kya Hai, Jaana Maine, Jab Se Tumko Jaana.". This was Lata Mangeshkar's final playback performance before her death in 2022.

== Release ==
=== Theatrical ===
Dunno Y2... Life Is A Moment was released in India on 18 September 2015. Later that month Kapil Sharma and Yuvraaj Parashar travelled to Europe and USA to attend the international premiere of the film at the 2015 Filmfest homochrom in Cologne, Germany, and the closing night screening at Barcelona International Gay and Lesbian Film Festival in Spain and Poland LGBT Film Festival 2016.
