= Shabab Sabri =

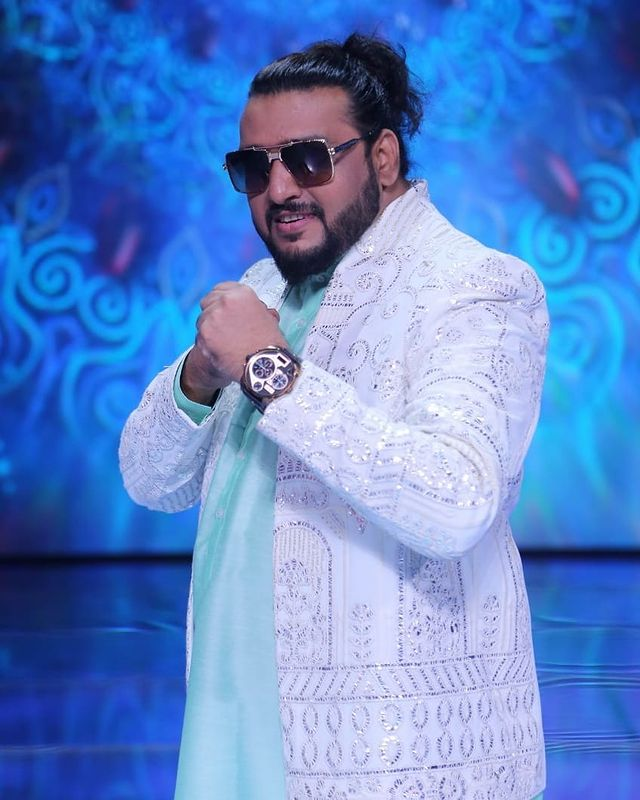
- Sabri in 2021

Background information
- Born: 6 July 1979 (age 46); Saharanpur, India
- Occupation: Playback singer
- Instrument: Vocals
- Years active: 1997–present

Shabab Sabri (born 6 July 1979) is a Bollywood playback singer.

Shabab Sabri's father Iqbal Sabri and uncle Afzal Sabri were qawalli and Sufi singers in India. Shabab Sabri began training under Rashid Khan Saheb at the age of 14 years. Later on Sabri learned and performed in many live shows with his father.

Sabri began his work as a playback singer in 1998 with the song "Teri Jawani badi mast mast hai" with his father and uncle.

== As a playback singer ==
Year released	Song	For	Co-singer(s)
2021	"Ibaadat Ban Gaye Ho"	Album	Smita Dahal
2021	"Kik {Kyun Ishq Kiya}"	Album	
2019	Hud Hud Dabangg	Dabangg 3	Divya Kumar
2019	Saiyaan Ve	Ek Kahani Julie Ki	Shehzad Ali, Naman Shastri, Javed Ali
2019	"Vodka Shot"	Album	Tarannum Mallick
2019	" On the Ramp Never Ending Show title track"...........	On the Ramp Never Ending Show	
2019	" Sufiyana Pyar Mera Title Song "	Sufiyana Pyar Mera	Javed Ali, Munali Thakur
2017	" Ali Ali "	Coffee with the D	
2017	"Mahi"	Irada	Harshdeep Kaur
2017	Nas Nas Mein	Welcome Back	Meet Bros Anjjan, Rani Hazarika
2017	Dil kare chu che	Singh Is Bliing	
2017	"Jalte Diye"	Prem Ratan Dhan Payo	Anweshaa, Harshdeep Kaur, Vinit Singh|
2017	" Eid Mubarak "	Daddy	
2016	"Love Hua"	Album	Sanchiti Sakat
2014	"Jaadu Tone Waaliyan"	Daawat-e-Ishq	
2014	"Tere Naina Maar Hi Daalenge"	Jai Ho	Shaan, Shreya Ghoshal
2013	"Khochey Pathan Ki Zubaan"	Zanjeer	Meet Bros Anjjan, Sukhwinder Singh
2013	Tujhse Alag Tujhse Juda	Super Model	Ujjawala Jadhav
2013	"Jhoom Barabar Jhoom"	Policegiri	Vinit Singh
2013	Tirat Meri Tu	Policegiri	Vinit Singh
2013	" Chhamiya No.1 "	Zila Ghaziabad	Sunidhi Chauhan
2013	"Gore Mukhde Pe"	Special 26	Aman Trikha, Shreya Ghoshal
2012	Picture Abhi Baki Hai	Mere Dost Picture Abhi Baki Hai	
2012	"Lagan Laagi"	Dangerous Ishhq	Shreya Ghoshal
2012	Umeed	Dangerous Ishhq	Amrita Kak
2012	"Dil Mera Muft Ka"	Agent Vinod	Muazzam, Nandini Shrikar, Rizwan
2012	"Chalao Na Naino Se"	Bol Bachchan	Himesh Reshammiya, Shreya Ghoshal
2011	"Damadamm"	Damadamm!	Alam Gir Khan, Himesh Reshammiya, Palak Muchhal, Punnu Brar, Rubina Shaikh, Sabina Shaikh, Vinit Singh
2010	"Humka Peeni Hai"	Dabangg	Wajid, Master Saleem
2010	"Kanha(Thumari) Pawan udave batiyan"	Veer	Rekha Bhardwaj, Sharib Sabri, Toshi Sabri
2007	Kamjaraf	Journey Bombay To Goa: Laughter Unlimited	Shehla Burney
2006	Duniyawalon Ko Nahi Kuch Bhi Khabar	Umar	Kavita Krishnamurthy, Prabodh Chandra Dey (Manna Dey), Sonu Nigam
2006	Ghoonghat Na Kholiyo	Iqraar by Chance	Sonu Kakkar
2005	Haay Bichhuwa	Jalwa: Fun In Love	Harshdeep Kaur
2005	Tere Ishq Ne Mujhako	Jalwa: Fun In Love	Sunidhi Chauhan
2005	Yahan Zindagi Ek Alag	Page 3	Shaan, Sagarika
2004	"Lahoo Banke Aansoo"	Mujhse Shaadi Karogi	Alka Yagnik, Sonu Nigam
1998	"Teri Jawani Badi Mast Mast"	Pyar Kiya Toh Darna Kya	Iqbal Sabri, Afzal Sabri

== Awards ==
Year	Award	Song	Film	Position
2018	ZEE AWARD			
2016	Police Umang Award			
2014	Chhatrapati Shivaji Rajmudra awards			
2014	Aap Ki Awaz Media Excellence Award			
