= Rakhi Ka Insaaf =

Indian tabloid talk show

- Genre: Reality show
- Created by: Akash Chopra, Amrit Sagar
- Directed by: Ashim Sen
- Presented by: Rakhi Sawant
- Country of origin: India
- Original language: Hindi

Production
- Producer: I AM Productions
- Cinematography: Nitesh Choudhary

Original release
- Network: NDTV Imagine

Rakhi Ka Insaaf (transl. Rakhi's justice) is an Indian tabloid talk show hosted by actress Rakhi Sawant, produced by I AM Productions aired on NDTV Imagine. The programme is mostly based on Jerry Springer.

== Controversy ==
The show is controversial for Sawant's use of obscene language. The show has been slammed by the Ministry of Information and Broadcasting of the Indian Government as well as the Allahabad High Court. Sawant has been accused of abetting suicide of a participant of the show. The family members of the participant maintained that the participant had slipped into depression and killed himself as Sawant had called him impotent on air. As of 8 December 2010, the High Court reserved its judgment regarding the guilt of Sawant in the abetment of suicide of the participant. The court observed the choice of language of the anchor was very offensive and uncivil. The bench also stated that the anchor should not transgress the bounds of ethical value. Sawant's arrest was however stayed as there was no suicide note left by the deceased vindicating Sawant. The Ministry had ordered that the time slots for the show on NDTV Imagine and Bigg Boss aired on Colors be changed from prime time to 11:00 p.m. until 3 December 2010. The shows were also directed to run a disclaimer stating that their content was unsuitable for children. News channels were also directed to not broadcast footage from these shows. The Bombay High Court had stayed this order.
