= Daal Mein Kuch Kaala Hai =

2012 Bollywood film

- Theatrical release poster
- Directed by: Aanand Balraj; assist.: Priyanka Raina
- Written by: Aanand Balraj
- Produced by: Urvashi Bali, Deepak Bali
- Starring: Veena Malik; Jackie Shroff; Vijay Raaz; Shakti Kapoor
- Cinematography: Harish Joshi
- Music by: T-Series
- Distributed by: D Bali Movies Pvt Ltd
- Release date: 29 June 2012
- Running time: 107 minutes
- Country: India
- Language: Hindi
- Budget: ₹60 million (US$710,000)

Daal Mein Kuch Kaala Hai is a 2012 Indian Hindi-language black comedy film directed by Anand Balraj. The film stars Veena Malik, Jackie Shroff, Anand Balraj, Shakti Kapoor, Vijay Raaz, Aman Verma and Bobby Darling.

== Plot ==
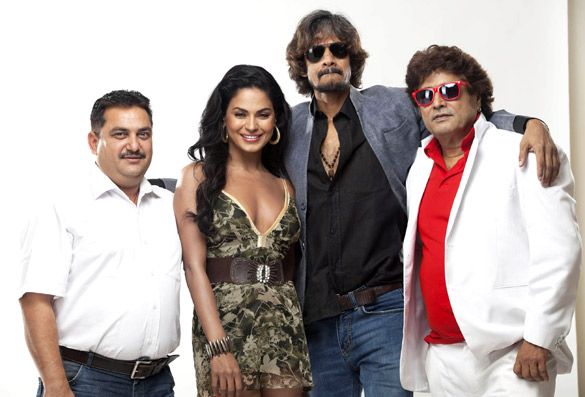
Veena Malik with the cast of "Daal Mein Kuch Kaala Hai"

Daal Mein Kuch Kaala Hai is a tale of a budding actress (Veena Malik) who is over motivated to become a successful in Bollywood. The story starts with Mr. Dabu who is a middle aged man in his forties, a total loser absconded and is being left unaccompanied in life. All of a sudden he gets rich after hitting a roll-over prize of birthright, and then decides to walk off to this actress to share his destiny and his future in the company of her. The starlet gets surprised and shocked after witnessing so much of wealth with him in cash. She initially agrees what his boyfriend had planned out to con Mr. Dabu, but is totally puzzled on what to carry out. They both sooner or later travel to the mysterious island, which is further followed by her boyfriend and a couple of unknown friends. The entire journey is filled with full humor, enjoyment and entertainment.

== Cast ==
- Veena Malik
- Jackie Shroff as Police inspector Fatke Maar
- Aanand Balraj
- Gehana Vasisth
- Vijay Raaz
- Shakti Kapoor
- Aman Verma
- Lilliput
- Raja Chaudhary
- Ali Hassan
- Razak Khan
- Irfan malik
- Varun bal raj
- Bobby Darling
- Shehzad Khan
- Sudesh Berry
- Kishore Bhanushali
- Sunaina Singh
- Sonika gill
- Jeniffer Pereira
- Ramesh goyal
- Heram tripathi
- Haseen mastaan mirza
- Zara
- Abhishek Agarwal aka Abbu Bin Laden
- Asst Director = Priyanka Raina
- Asst Director = Vikaas Gaur

== Soundtrack ==
The music is composed by Aabfm, whereas the lyrics of it are written down by Naresh, Anand Balraj, Nasir and Vijay Akela. The songs are sung by Ritu Pathak, Vinod Rathod, Mamta Sharma, Amit Kumar, Bali Brahmabhatt and Arun Daga.

Track listing
No.	Title	Artist(s)	Length
1.	"Madam Malai"	Ritu Pathak, Apeksha Dandekar	04:18
2.	"Vada Pav"	Vinod Rathod	04:01
3.	"Mumbai Money Hai"	Mamta Sharma	03:40
4.	"Apun ki Life"	Amit Kumar & Bali Bharambhatt	04:12
5.	"Nadiya"	Arun Daga	05:14
