= Sarosh Sami =

Sarosh Sami Khatib credited as Sarosh Sami or Sarosh Khatib, is an Indian singer who is known for his music album ‘Hey Ya’ (2005) released by Universal Music. Sarosh is a trained tabla player from the Sangeet Mahabharti Institute. The Institute was founded by the Late Pandit Nikhil Ghosh. He started his career as a tabla player and then started singing.

== Discography ==
- Hey Ya (Sarosh Sami album) (2005)

=== Tishnagi (2010) (Album Details) ===
Tishnagi contains 8 tracks.

- Tishnagi
- Rubaru
- Tum Ho
- Tapish -Tapish
- Sun le
- Janaa Kya
- Aasmaani
- Forever Green

== Forever Green ==
The Forever Green anthem was created for an awareness campaign titled - Do We Really Think Green. The campaign was run with the Mayor of Mumbai - Smt Shraddha Jadhav, with a free sapling distribution drive carried out across the city through colleges, schools and churches. Sarosh Sami sang the anthem live at the Mayoral Bungalow along with the then Indian Idol finalists - Sreeram Chandra, Bhoomi Trivedi, Rakesh Maini & Swaroop Khan. The campaign was also recognized by United Nations Environment Programme on World Environment Day. The music for the anthem is given by the music composer Lalit Pundit.
