= Neha Pendse =

Indian actress (born 1984)

Neha Pendse Bayas
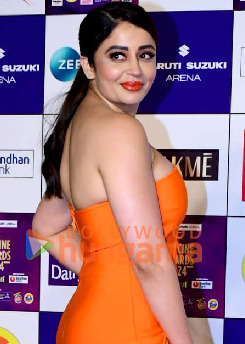
- Pendse in 2024
- Born: Nehha Pendse; 29 November 1984 (age 41); Bombay, Maharashtra, India
- Occupations: Actress; producer
- Years active: 1995–present
- Spouse: Shardul Singh Bayas (m. 2020)

Nehha Pendse Bayas (née Pendse; born 29 November 1984) is an Indian actress and producer known for her work primarily in Marathi and Hindi films and television, along with appearances in other language films. She has received several awards including two Maharashtra State Film Awards and a Filmfare Award Marathi.

Pendse started her career as a child artist in Ekta Kapoor's horror show Captain House in 1995, when she was ten years old. She rose to prominence through notable roles in Hindi TV shows like Padosan and Hasratein. Her film debut happened in 1999 with an uncredited appearance in Daag: The Fire, followed by playing Sunny Deol's sibling in Pyaar Koi Khel Nahin. Her first role as an on-screen adult came in 2002, at age 17, in the Telugu romantic comedy Sontham and the Tamil romantic drama Mounam Pesiyadhe. Next, she acted in the romantic film Inidhu Inidhu Kadhal Inidhu (2003), the suicidal drama Nothing but Life (2004), and the action-thriller Abraham & Lincoln (2007).

Notably, she gained recognition in the Marathi film industry during the late 2000s, starring in films like Agnividya and the family drama daily soap Bhagyalakshmi, portraying complex characters. Although she appeared in various Marathi films thereafter, including the fictional biopic Dusari Goshta (2014), the comedy Premasathi Coming Suun (2014), the inspirational drama Balkadu (2015), and the drama Natsamrat (2016). Despite her success in Marathi cinema, she also made notable appearances on Hindi television, notably in the sitcom May I Come In Madam? in 2016 and participated in Bigg Boss season 12. In 2021, Pendse's performance in the Marathi film June, which she co-produced, garnered critical acclaim, earning her a Filmfare Award Marathi for Best Actress. In 2020, she married businessman Shardul Singh Bayas.

== Early life ==
Pendse was born on 29 November 1984 in Bombay to Vijay Pendse and Shubhangi Pendse.

== Career ==
=== 1995–2004: Career beginnings and acting debut ===
Pendse began her acting journey at the age of ten, making her debut as a child actor in the television series Captain House in 1995, under the production of Ekta Kapoor. Her talent broke through, and she rose to prominence in the Hindi entertainment industry as a child actor, featuring in notable shows such as Padosan (1996), Hasratein (1996), Ghunghat Ke Pat khol (1999), Meethi Meethi Baatein (1998), and the Marathi series Pimpalpaan (1999). Venturing into episodic television, she showcased her versatility through various roles in Rishtey–The Love Stories, delving into the complexities of human relationships with nuance and depth.

In 1999, she marked her Hindi film debut, although uncredited, in Daag: The Fire, and the same year, she portrayed Sunny Deol's sister in Pyaar Koi Khel Nahin. Throughout this period, she often portrayed the roles of siblings to the main protagonists in Hindi cinema, featuring in films like Deewane (2000), Chhupa Rustam: A Musical Thriller (2001), Tum Se Achcha Kaun Hai (2002). Particularly noteworthy was her role as Madhuri Dixit's friend, Chaurangi, in Devdas (2002), which she secured without an audition while still in tenth grade. In 2002, she ventured into the Telugu film industry with her leading role debut in the romantic comedy Sontham, where she was the sole female lead among three friends. Her performance was deemed "promising" by critics, and the film proved to be a box-office success. Additionally, during the same year, she made her debut in Tamil cinema with the romantic drama Mounam Pesiyadhe, starring alongside Suriya, Trisha and Nandha.

The following year, Pendse appeared alongside J. D. Chakravarthy in the Telugu comedy Golmaal, which was a remake of the 1994 Malayalam film Malappuram Haji Mahanaya Joji. Critics observed that her roles in these films were somewhat limited. However, her performance in her next venture, Inidhu Inidhu Kadhal Inidhu in 2003, received acclaim. Malathi Rangarajan of The Hindu praised her portrayal, stating, "Neha, whom we saw as the second heroine in Mounam Pesiyathe is apt as the bold, belligerent Mamathi later softened by love." Similarly, Malini Mannath for Chennai Online noted, "Neha has charming demeanour and the talent to go with it. Vadivelu tries hard to make you laugh," mentioning her noticeable presence even in a supporting role in Mounam Pesiyathe.'"

In 2004, Pendse got into the English-Malayalam experimental bilingual film Nothing but Life. In the film, she starred opposite R. Madhavan, portraying the character of a suicidal girl born in the US but with Malayalee roots. The movie was showcased at various film festivals, including the 12th Kerala International Film Festival, before its theatrical release. Unfortunately, upon its commercial release, the film failed to make an impact at the box office. Nonetheless, this project served as Pendse's debut in the Malayalam cinema industry. Also, she acted in the Malayalam delayed release Twinkle Twinkle Little Star and played a supporting role in the Kannada action drama Inspector Jhansi in 2005. That same year, she got her first lead role in a Hindi movie titled Dreams, but it didn't do well with critics or at the box office.

Following that, she featured in the Malayalam film Abraham & Lincoln, directed by Pramod Pappan, portraying the character of Nancy, Lincoln's sister, who faced challenges and dealt with mental health issues stemming from an incident during her studies. The film received positive reviews from both critics and audiences, particularly praising her performance. Subsequently, she appeared in the Hindi drama Swami, directed by Ganesh Acharya, alongside Manoj Bajpayee and Maninder Singh, portraying the role of Bajpayee's daughter-in-law. While Swami received mixed reviews from critics, her performance was highlighted. She then starred opposite Upendra in the Kannada action film Parodi, playing the role of a journalist. Despite the film's lackluster performance at the box office, critics commended her performance and the chemistry between her and Upendra. Moviebuzz critics commented that Neha's portrayal of a journalist indicates room for improvement, while RG Vijayasarathy of Rediff.com wrote, "Upendra and Neha are the saving graces of this otherwise weak film." In 2008, she once again collaborated with Upendra and director Om Sai Prakash in Veedhi Rowdy.

=== 2009–2015: Expansion in films and other success ===
In 2009, she portrayed the teenage daughter of a divorced mother, played by Gracy Singh, in Aseema: Beyond Boundaries. That same year, she made her debut in Marathi cinema with Agnidivya, where she starred alongside Subodh Bhave, Reema Lagoo, Mohan Agashe, and Mohan Joshi. The film, based on Chintamani Tryambak Khanolkar's novel Agochar, centers around the conflict between her character, Nandini, who is married to Bhave's character, a cruel man, and Anandrao, the autocratic leader. Nandini must confront a challenging ordeal known as the cleansing fire, 'Agnidivya.' It received critical acclaim in the Marathi film industry in 2009 and was also recommended for consideration in the Best Foreign Language Film category at the 82nd Academy Awards.

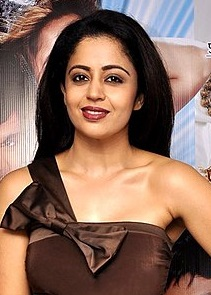
Pendse in 2014.

In 2010, she gained widespread acclaim for her role in the Marathi family drama series Bhagyalakshmi. Portraying the lead character of a troubled woman named Kashi, she starred alongside Vikram Gokhale, Priya Berde, and Surekha Kudachi. The storyline revolves around Kashi, the daughter of a devdasi, who marries Sanjay, a politician's relative. However, the village head, Bappaji, becomes apprehensive about Kashi's strong devotion to Goddess Bhirai, fearing it might challenge his authority. This marked her return to television after an eight-year.

In 2013, her role in the internationally acclaimed drama film Touring Talkies, directed by Gajendra Ahire, once again brought attention, as the film was considered for the Best Foreign Language Film category at the 86th Academy Awards. In the movie, she portrayed a brief role as an actress working with an indie filmmaker, who is shocked to discover some unexpected moments in the film. Keyur Seta of The Common Man Speaks praised her performance, stating that "Pendse shines in a cameo." The following year, she had a busy schedule with appearances in five films. She played a supporting role in Rajendra Talak's A Rainy Day and took on the female lead in the fictional biopic Dusari Goshta, directed by Chandrakant Kulkarni, based on the life of former Home Minister Sushilkumar Shinde. Additionally, she was part of two multi-starrer films: Hu Tu Tu directed by Kanchan Adhikari, alongside Jitendra Joshi, Hemant Dhome, and Mansi Naik, and Bol Baby Bol alongside Aruna Irani, Makarand Anaspure, and Aniket Vishwasrao. In Premasathi Coming Suun, she played the main protagonist, a prospective bride with a hidden agenda opposite Adinath Kothare. Mihir Bhanage of The Times of India complimented her appearance, stating that "Neha looks ravishing after having lost those extra kilos."

In 2015, she starred opposite Umesh Kamat in Balkadu, a film inspired by the ideologies of the late Indian politician Bal Thackeray. In the movie, she portrayed the childhood sweetheart of Kamat's character, reuniting with him after a long separation and providing unwavering support in his endeavors. Keertikumar Kadam of Marathi Movie World praised her performance, stating that "Pendse does what was expected of her and looks ravishingly stunning, on screen." Following this, she appeared in Anant Mahadevan's biographical film Gour Hari Dastaan, which depicts the life of an Indian freedom fighter from Odisha.

=== 2016–present: Claim to fame and Bigg Boss 12 ===
In 2016, she experienced significant success, marking her return to Hindi television with the lead role in the comedy-drama May I Come In Madam? airing on Life OK. In the show, she portrayed the charming boss of a young man who feels downtrodden due to his overbearing wife. The series quickly became one of the top-rated shows in 2016. Furthermore, she portrayed the daughter-in-law of the titular character in Natsamrat, played by Nana Patekar and directed by Mahesh Manjrekar. This cinematic adaptation, based on a play by the renowned playwright Kusumagraj, delves into the poignant family dynamics of a retired stage actor grappling with nostalgia for his past life in the theater. Natsamrat garnered widespread praise upon its release, becoming the top-grossing Marathi film of its time with earnings of ₹48 crore. The following year, she had only one film release, Nagarsevak - Ek Nayak, which received negative reviews, starring opposite Upendra Limaye.

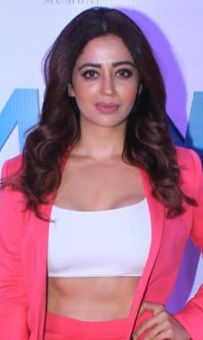
Pendse in 2019.

In 2018, Pendse was involved in various reality television programs. She participated as a contestant on shows like Comedy Dangal and Entertainment Ki Raat. Additionally, she served as the presenter alongside Kapil Sharma on the reality comedy game show Family Time With Kapil Sharma. Pendse also entered the popular reality TV show Bigg Boss 12 as a contestant, but was eliminated on the 28th day, on 14 October. Furthermore, she took part in the fourth season of the celebrity Indian sports reality show, Box Cricket League, an indoor cricket game format.

In 2021, Pendse took over the role of Anita Vibhuti Narayan Mishra in the popular daily sitcom Bhabiji Ghar Par Hain!, replacing Saumya Tandon. However, she left the show in January 2022. Her next project was the Marathi drama film June, set in Aurangabad, tackling various social issues such as bullying, sexism, suicide, and the generation gap. In the film, she portrays a troubled married woman. Pendse not only acted in the film but also co-produced it without charging any fee. Critics applauded Pendse's performance, with Mihir Bhanage from The Times of India describing it as a "revelation" and noted, "she channels Neha's inner turmoil effortlessly and is comfortable in the skin of the character." Another critic from Film Information commended, "Pendse Bayas delivers an honest performance, straight from the heart. She lives the character of Neha and expresses the anguish of a separated woman to the hilt. Not once does she go overboard in her performance." The film screened at several festivals, including the Pune International Film Festival, International Film Festival of Kerala, New York Indian Film Festival and 51st International Film Festival of India. Her performance in June earned her Filmfare Award Marathi for Best Actress and a nomination at Fakt Marathi Cine Sanman.

From mid-2023 to 2024, she returned to her popular role as Sanjana Hiteshi in the second season of May I Come In Madam? 2, which aired on Star Bharat.

In 2026, Pendse appeared in and co-produced along with husband Shardul Singh Bayas the Marathi film Tighee, portraying a troubled woman grappling with workplace harassment and tensions within her family. Sameer Ahire of Movie Talkies described it as the “best performance of her career,” writing, "She proves what a superb performer she truly is, and every single emotional scene loudly showcases her talent and sincerity." Prior to its theatrical release, the film premiered at the Pune International Film Festival in January 2026, where it received positive reviews.

== Personal life ==
The actress tied the knot with her boyfriend Shardul Singh Bayas on 5 January 2020, in a traditional Marathi ceremony. During an interview, Neha revealed that Shardul proposed marriage three months after they started dating, in April. The couple started dating in early 2019. Neha changed her name after marriage, adding Bayas to her last name.

== Media ==
Pendse was ranked in The Times Most Desirable Women at No. 49 in 2019.

== Filmography ==
Key
†	Denotes films that have not yet been released

=== Films ===
Year	Title	Role	Language	Notes	Ref.
1999	Daag: The Fire	Unnamed	Hindi	Uncredited role; child artist	
1999	Pyaar Koi Khel Nahin	Guddi	Hindi	Child artist	
2000	Deewane	Nimmo	Hindi	Child artist	
2001	Chhupa Rustam	Guddi Chinoy	Hindi	Child artist	
2002	Tum Se Achcha Kaun Hai	Anu Dixit	Hindi	Child artist	
2002	Devdas	Chaurangi	Hindi	Child artist	
2002	Sontham	Soumya	Telugu		
2002	Mounam Pesiyadhe	Mahalakshmi	Tamil	credited as Maha	
2003	Golmaal	Mumtaz	Telugu		
2003	Inidhu Inidhu Kadhal Inidhu	Mamathi	Tamil		
2004	Nothing but Life	Rachel	English		
2004	Nothing but Life	Rachel	Malayalam		
2005	Twinkle Twinkle Little Star	Neha	Malayalam	Delayed	
2005	Dreams	Pooja	Hindi		
2005	Inspector Jhansi	Chitra	Kannada		
2007	Abraham & Lincoln	Nancy George	Malayalam		
2007	Podarillu	Neha	Telugu		
2007	Swami	Pooja	Hindi		
2007	Parodi	Bharathi	Kannada		
2008	Veedhi Rowdy	Veedhi	Telugu		
2009	Aseema: Beyond Boundaries	Gudiya A. Mohanty	Hindi		
2009	Lek Majhi Gunachi	Herself	Marathi	Special appearance	
2009	Agnidivya	Nandini	Marathi		
2011	Sharyat	Herself	Marathi	Special appearance in an item number "Sheelachya Aicha Gho"	
2011	Dil Toh Baccha Hai Ji	Neha Desai	Hindi	Special appearance	
2012	Mr. Bhatti on Chutti		Hindi		
2012	Snake And Ladder		Malayalam		
2013	Touring Talkies	Sonu	Marathi		
2013	Kurukshetra	Lavani Dancer	Marathi	Special appearance in an item number "Kali Khulwa Na"	
2013	Vanshvel	Herself	Marathi	Special appearance in song "Ambe Krupa Kari"	
2014	A Rainy Day	Simran	Marathi		
2014	Dusari Goshta	Anjali	Marathi		
2014	Hu Tu Tu	Preeti	Marathi		
2014	Bol Baby Bol	Sonali	Marathi		
2014	Premasathi Coming Suun	Antara	Marathi		
2015	Balkadu	Sai	Marathi		
2015	Gour Hari Dastaan	Neha Das	Hindi		
2016	Natsamrat	Neha Makrand Belwalkar	Marathi		
2016	35% Kathavar Pass	Teacher	Marathi		
2017	Nagarsevak - Ek Nayak	Komal Shinde	Marathi		
2020	Suraj Pe Mangal Bhari	Kavya Godbole	Hindi		
2020	June	Neha	Marathi	Also Producer	
2026	Tighee	Swati Karnik	Marathi	Also Producer	

=== Television ===
Year	Title	Role	Language	Ref.
1995–1996	Captain House		Hindi	
1995–1997	Padosan		Hindi	
1996	Hasratein	Urja	Hindi	
1998–1999	Meethi Meethi Baatein		Hindi	
1998–1999	Pimpalpaan		Marathi	
1999–2000	Rishtey	Aashu and Binni	Hindi	
2000	Kushi		Hindi	
2000	Ghar Ek Mandir	Sapna 's sister	Hindi	
2002–2003	Ssshhhh... Koi Hai	Madhuri and Nemolika	Hindi	
2010-2011	Bhagyalakshmi	Kashi Mohite	Marathi	
2011	Eka Peksha Ek Apsara Aali	Contestant	Marathi	
2012	Madhubala – Ek Ishq Ek Junoon	Ria	Hindi	
2016–2017	May I Come In Madam?	Sanjana Hiteshi	Hindi	
2017	Comedy Dangal	Contestant	Hindi	
2018	Partners Trouble Ho Gayi Double	Chamku	Hindi	
2018	Family Time With Kapil Sharma	Host	Hindi	
2018	Entertainment Ki Raat	Host	Hindi	
2018	Bigg Boss 12	Contestant	Hindi	
2019	Khatra Khatra Khatra	Guest	Hindi	
2019	Kitchen Champion 5	Guest	Hindi	
2019	Box Cricket League 4	Player	Hindi	
2021–2022	Bhabiji Ghar Par Hain!	Anita Vibhuti Narayan Mishra	Hindi	
2023–2024	May I Come In Madam? 2	Sanjana Hiteshi	Hindi	

== Awards and nominations ==
Year	Award	Category	Work	Result	Ref.
2009	Maharashtra State Film Awards	Best Debut Actress	Agnidivya	Won	
2016	Maharashtracha Favourite Kon?	Favourite Supporting Actress	Natsamrat	Nominated	
2016	Indian Television Academy Awards	Best Actress - Comedy	May I Come In Madam?	Nominated	
2017	Indian Television Academy Awards	Best Actress - Comedy	May I Come In Madam?	Nominated	
2020	New York Indian Film Festival	Best Film	June	Nominated	
2021	Pune International Film Festival	Best Actress	June	Won	
2021	Filmfare Award Marathi	Best Actress	June	Won	
2022	Fakt Marathi Cine Sanman	Best Actress in a Lead Role	June	Nominated	
2024	Maharashtra State Film Awards	Best Debut Film Production	June	Won	
2024	Pinkvilla Screen and Style Icons Awards	Best Marathi Female Style Icon	—N/a	Won	
2026	National Indian Film Festival of Australia	Best Indie Feature	Tighee (Motherhood)	Won	

== See also ==
- List of Indian film actresses
