= May I Come In Madam? season 1 =

Indian Hindi-language sitcom TV series

May I Come In Madam?
- Season 1
- Starring: Sandeep Anand; Neha Pendse; Sapna Sikarwar
- No. of episodes: 385

Release
- Original network: Life OK
- Original release: 7 March 2016 – 25 August 2017

Season chronology
- Next → Season 2

The first season of the Indian Hindi-language comedy drama television sitcom May I Come In Madam? aired on Life OK from 7 March 2016 to 25 August 2017. Produced by Binaifer S Kohli and Sanjay R Kohli under Edit ll production, it stars Neha Pendse, Sandeep Anand and Sapna Sikarwar.

== Plot ==
A young man, Sajan Agarwal, is dejected after being constantly henpecked by his wife. However, he is smitten by his good-looking boss Sanjana and seeks her attention. Sajan Agarwal is also mentally tortured by his mother-in-law Ramvati and brother-in-law Bhupesh. Slowly, Sajan falls in Love with Sanjana and his friend Khiloni knows it. The series portrays Sajan is stuck between His Office love and wife.

== Cast ==
- Sandeep Anand as Sajan Agarwal aka Sanju - Ramvati's son-in-law, Kashmira's husband, Bhupesh's brother-in-law, Khiloni's friend, Sanjana's employee.
- Neha Pendse as Sanjana Hiteshi (Madam) - Chedilal's daughter, Sajan's boss
- Sapna Sikarwar as Kashmira Agarwal and the deceased grandmother - Ramvati's daughter, Bhupesh's Sister, Sajan's wife
- Soma Rathod as Ramvati - Kashmira and Bhupesh's mother, Sajan's mother-in-law.
- Anup Upadhyay as Mr. Chedilal Hiteshi - The chairman of Use Me Advertising and Peon Chedi without glasses; Sanjana's father
- Melissa Pais as TV Program Presenter Kaamini
- Deepesh Bhan as Bhupesh - Ramvati's son, Kashmira's brother; Sajan's brother-in-law
- Vaibhav Mathur as Rajkishore - Sajan's neighbour
- Feroz (actor) as Vegetable Seller
- Saheb Das Manikpuri as Khiloni - Sajan's best friend
- Satish Kaushik as Boby Aggarwal - Sajan's uncle

== Production ==
In January and April 2017, the set caught fire, in both cases following explosions in high-intensity lights. The producers stated in press releases that no one had been injured.

== Reception ==
By October 2016, after six months of broadcast, the series was one of the top-running shows on Life Ok and had a TRP of 0.9.

== See also ==
- List of Hindi comedy shows
