= May I Come In Madam? season 2 =

Indian Hindi-language sitcom

May I Come In Madam?
- Season 2
- Genre
- Starring: Nehha Pendse; Sandeep Anand; Sapna Sikarwar
- No. of episodes: 101

Release
- Original network: Star Bharat
- Original release: 26 September 2023 – 20 January 2024

Season chronology
- ← Previous; Season 1

The second season of the Indian Hindi-language comedy drama television sitcom May I Come In Madam? was originally premiered on Life OK in 2016. Produced by Binaifer S Kohli and Sanjay R Kohli under Edit II productions, it starred Neha Pendse, Sandeep Anand and Sapna Sikarwar. It aired from 26 September 2023 to 20 January 2024 on Star Bharat.

== Cast ==
=== Main ===
- Neha Pendse as Sanjana Hiteshi (Madam) - Chedilal's daughter, Pyaari's cousin sister, Sajan and Bhupesh's boss (2023 - 2024)
- Sandeep Anand as Sajan Agarwal aka Sanju - Ramvati's son-in-law, Kashmira's husband, Bhupesh's brother-in-law, Khiloni and Batoota's best friend, Sanjana's employee (2023 - 2024)
- Sapna Sikarwar as Kashmira Agarwal and grandmother's spirit - Ramvati's elder daughter, Bhupesh's sister, Sajan's wife (2023 - 2024)

=== Recurring ===
- Soma Rathod as Ramvati - Kashmira and Bhupesh's mother, Sajan's mother-in-law, Chedilal's lover (2023 - 2024)
- Anup Upadhyay as Chedilal Hiteshi - The Chairman of Use Me Advertising and Peon Chedi without glasses, Vinod's best friend, Sanjana's father, Pyaari's uncle, Ramvati's boyfriend (2023 - 2024)
- Vipin Heroo as Bhupesh - Ramvati's younger son, Kashmira's brother, Sajan's brother-in-law, Sanjana's employee, Pyaari's colleague (2023 - 2024)
- Saheb Das Manikpuri as Khiloni - Sajan and Batoota's best friend (2023 - 2024)
- Pradeep Nigam as Inspector Bablu Batoota - Vinod's employee, Sajan and Khiloni's best friend (2023 - 2024)
- Prem Vallab as Commissioner Vinod Khanna - Batoota's Boss, Chedilal's best friend (2023 - 2024)
- Pyaari Rajput as Pyaari Hiteshi - Sanjana's cousin sister, Chedilal’s niece, Bhupesh's colleague (2023 - 2024)
- Sumit Arora as Balu - Bably's husband (2023 - 2024)
- Khushboo Kamal as Bably - Balu's wife (2023 - 2024)
- Shivam Mahrotra as Tetnus - A salesman in Khiloni's medical store (2023 - 2024)
- Naveen Bawa as Various Characters (2023 - 2024)
- Pranay Dixit as Various Characters (2023 - 2024)

== Production ==
The series was announced by Edit ll production for Star Bharat. Neha Pendse, Sandeep Anand and Sapna Sikarwar were signed as the lead. The principal photography commenced from September 2023 and mainly shot at the Film City, Mumbai. In September 2023, Khushboo Kamal and Sumit Arora join the cast.

== See also ==
- List of programs broadcast by Star Bharat
- List of Hindi comedy shows
