= Tapa =

Tapa, TAPA, Tapas or Tapasya may refer to:

== Media ==
- Tapas (website), a webtoon site, formerly known as Tapastic
- Tapas (film), a 2005 Spanish film
- Tapasya (1976 film), an Indian Hindi-language film
- Tapasya (1992 film), a Nepalese film
- Transactions of the American Philological Association, a journal

== Places ==
- Tapa, Estonia, a town
- Tapa Airfield, an unused aircraft base in Estonia
- Tapa Army Base, a military base in Estonia
- V. C. Bird International Airport, by ICAO airport code

== People ==
- Tapas (given name), a given name (including a list of people with the name)
- Tapasya Nayak Srivastava, Indian actress
- Swami Tapasyananda (Ramakrishna Mission), Indian religious leader
- Nupe people, an African people traditionally called the "Tapa" by the neighboring Yoruba people
- Tapa Tchermoeff

== Religion ==
- Tapas (Indian religions), a variety of austere spiritual meditation practices

== Food ==
- Tapa (Filipino cuisine)
- Tapas, a Spanish snack

== Organizations ==
- TaPa (Tampereen Palloilijat), sports club from Tampere, Finland
- Taipei Adventist Preparatory Academy, a Christian high school in Taiwan
- Toronto Alliance for the Performing Arts
- Taiwan Action Party Alliance
- Tapasya College of Commerce and Management, India

== Other uses ==
- Tapa cloth, a traditional cloth from Polynesia
- Tapa (game), similar to backgammon
- Trillium Advanced Portability Architecture, by Trillium Digital Systems

== See also ==
- Tapsi (disambiguation)
