= Tapas (given name) =

Tapas or Tapasya is an Indian given name. It may refer to:

== Etymology ==
Tapas (Sanskrit: तपस्) is a concept in Indian religions that refers to a variety of ascetic practices including austerities and penance.

== People in performing arts ==
- Tapasya Nayak Srivastava, television actress
- Tapas Paul (1958–2020), actor and politician
- Tapas Relia, music composer and producer
- Tapas Sargharia, Ollywood film director
- Tapas Sen (1924–2006), stage lighting designer

== Other people ==
- Tapas Kumar Kundu (born 1962), molecular biologist
- Tapas Posman (born 1973), Papua New Guinean footballer
- Tapasyananda (1904–1991), senior monk of the Ramakrishna Mission

== See also ==
- Tapa (disambiguation)
