= List of Hindi comedy shows =

Hindi Comedy TV Shows List

This is a list of narrative-driven comedy television series broadcast primarily in the Hindi language across various Indian television channels. It includes various subgenres such as sitcoms, family comedies, and satirical dramas with significant comedic elements.

Hindi comedy series also extend into period or historical comedy formats, such as Har Mushkil Ka Hal – Akbar Birbal, which has been cited as one of the early examples of a historical-comedy television series appealing to mainstream Hindi audiences.

The genre has a long legacy dating back to the 1990s and early 2000s, with several classic Hindi comedy serials from that era continuing to be celebrated for their narrative style and humour.

== Hindi Comedy TV Shows ==
=== Key ===
Series shaded in light green are currently in production.

Aired Years	Title	Description	Production	Channel	Ref
1984 – 1985	Yeh Jo Hai Zindagi	The story revolves around a married couple and the young unemployed brother of wife who came to live in his sister's house.	Oberoi Films	DD National	
1986 – 1987	Idhar Udhar	Thrown together in the same flat by an estate agency goof-up, the two long-lost friends Sunnu and Punnu end up sharing the same apartment exactly the way they used to 13 years ago, with a slight twist.	Advance Entertainment Network Ltd.	DD National	
1986 – 1987	Nukkad	Each was based on an everyday issue of lower-income people and often revolved around one or two specific characters. Some episodes ended on hope and positive consolation while some had a sad but realistic conclusion.	†	DD National	
1988 – 1990	Wagle Ki Duniya	The series was set around the everyday struggles, of the nervous sales clerk, Srinivas Wagle, who lived with the prudence of a middle-class person of the time.	Durga Khote Productions	DD National	
1989	Flop Show	The sitcom was a satire on the socio-cultural problems faced by a common Indian at the time.	Jaspal Bhatti Production	DD National	
1990	Mungerilal Ke Haseen Sapne	Leading a difficult life Mungerilal finds relief through his dreams where he settles scores with everyone and fulfills the secret desires of his heart.	Bulbul Original	DD National	
1993 – 1994	Dekh Bhai Dekh	The story revolves around three generations of the Diwan family's relationship troubles and business problems.	Amitabh Bachchan Corporation	DD Metro	
1993 – 1998	Zabaan Sambhalke	A reluctant engineer turned Hindi teacher clashes with a strict principal while navigating a diverse classroom of international students.	Eagle Films	DD Metro (season 1); Home TV (season 2)	
1994 – 2006	Tu Tu Main Main	The story is about the arguments and love and hate between daughter-in-law and mother-in-law.	Prime Channel	DD Metro; Star Plus	
1994 – 1999	Shrimaan Shrimati	The show revolves around two neighboring couples, in which the husbands are attracted to each other's wives and attempt various tropes to impress them while constantly failing to do so.	Shri Adhikari Brothers	DD National	
1995	Full Tension	Jaspal Bhatti, a popular comedian, presents comical skits that portray situations from daily lives in a satirical manner.	Jaspal Bhatti Productions	DD National	
1995 – 1999	Hum Paanch Season - 1	A man struggles to manage his five very different daughters, each with a distinct personality, creating constant chaos. His late first wife's talking portrait and his younger second wife further complicate the situation.	Balaji Telefilms	Zee TV	
2005 – 2006	Hum Paanch Season - 2	A man struggles to manage his five very different daughters, each with a distinct personality, creating constant chaos. His late first wife's talking portrait and his younger second wife further complicate the situation.	Balaji Telefilms	Zee TV	
1995	Chamatkar	Prem is blessed with a special gift that allows him to listen to people's thoughts though he has a hearing problem. With the help of this gift, he helps solve many cases for the police.	Bulbul Art	Sony Entertainment Television	
1996	Filmi Chakkar	A film-obsessed family uses movie dialogue to navigate their daily life. However, unusual circumstances challenge their devotion to the cinema.	Ashoke Pandit	Zee TV	
1998	Tere Ghar Ke Samne	Two families live in opposite homes. They all dislike one another, which creates humor.	Shri Adhikari Brothers	DD Metro	
1998 – 1999	Family No. 1	The show had two families, with three kids each, who ended up having to share a newly rented house.	Edit II Productions	Sony Entertainment Television	
1998 – 1999	Hudd Kar Di	A sitcom about a city family whose lives are disrupted when their traditional village parents move in, creating comical clashes between generations.	Dara Studio - not sure	Zee TV	
1999 – 2009	Yes Boss	A married couple working in the same office keeps their relationship secret. Their flirtatious boss relentlessly pursues the wife, creating comedic chaos.	Shri Adhikari Brothers	SAB TV	
2000 – 2003	Gharwali Uparwali	A man remarries after his first wife's death, but her spirit continues to live in their home. This creates a comical love triangle between the husband, his new wife, and the ghost of his first wife.	Prime Channel	Star Plus	
2001 – 2003	Hum Saath Aath Hain	The show centers on a joint family led by widower Satya Prakash Kapoor, who has two sons, Ram and Laxman. The show explores his desire to find suitable brides for his sons and the dynamics within their family.	Prime Channel	Star Plus	
2001	Ji Mantriji	The show revolves around the life of a village headman, Mantriji, and his family. He tries to maintain order in the village and solve the problems of his villagers.	Ochre Moving Pictures	Star Plus	
2001 – 2004	Office Office	The series is based on the rampant corruption and bribery seen in public offices. The story revolves around Mussadilal who is often harshly treated by corrupt officials.	Eagle Films	SAB TV	
2002 – 2004	Khichdi	The typical story of a joint family of India and how the whole family solves the problems, either within joint family or outside the family.	UTV Software Communications; Hats Off Productions	Star Plus	
2003 – 2007	Shararat	A young woman who discovers she comes from a family of fairies and inherits magical powers.	UTV Software Communications	Star Plus	
2003 – 2007	Phir Bhi Dil Hai Hindustani (TV Series)	Patriotic anthology series on Indian television. Each episode or story focused on themes of national unity, integrity, and the struggles of ordinary citizens.	Prime Channel	DD National	
2003 – 2004	The Adventures of Tenali Raman	Classic tales of the witty court jester. Each episode showcased Tenali Raman's intelligence and humor as he solved problems and outsmarted rivals in the Vijayanagara court.	Toonz Animation	Cartoon Network India	
2004 – 2017	Sarabhai vs Sarabhai	The show revolves around the life of an upper-class Gujarati family, the Sarabhais, who live in a luxury apartment building and later in penthouses in the upmarket Cuffe Parade area of South Mumbai.	Hats Off Productions	Star One (season 1); Hotstar (season 2)	
2005	Instant Khichdi	The show follows the eccentric Parekh family in Mumbai, known for their bizarre antics and dysfunctional dynamics.	Hats Off Productions	Star One	
2005	LOC — Life Out of Control	Set in London, LOC pivots around an Indian cook, Gurpreet Singh Malik, and a Pakistani headwaiter Chand Mohammad Malik working in a restaurant owned by a British	UTV Software Communications	Star Plus	
2005 - 2009	Baa Bahoo Aur Baby	The story of an elderly woman, Godavari Thakkar, and her family: six sons, two daughters, and their spouses and children.	Hats Off Productions	Star Plus	
2005 - 2009	Hari Mirchi Lal Mirchi	A middle-aged man goes through various trials and tragedies as he is trapped between his nagging wife and an indifferent ex-wife.	Samvaad Video Private Limited	DD National	
2006 – 2007	Vicky Aur Vetaal Season - 1	The story of a boy and a spirit. Vicky is a mischievous boy and Vetaal is a troublesome spirit. Vicky released Vetaal from a banyan tree. After that, Vetaal leads Vicky into troubles.	Cinevistaas Limited	Disney Channel India	
2015 – 2016	Vicky Aur Vetaal Season - 2	The story of a boy and a spirit. Vicky is a mischievous boy and Vetaal is a troublesome spirit. Vicky released Vetaal from a banyan tree. After that, Vetaal leads Vicky into troubles.	Cinevistaas Limited	Disney Channel India	
2006 – 2015	F.I.R	Set in a police station, the show follows a Haryanvi female police officer and her team as they solve bizarre cases with unorthodox methods.	Edit II Productions	SAB TV	
2007	Agadam Bagdam Tigdam	The Malhotra family are Aliens, they came on earth to spend 12 years with humans. They came from a planet called Zoltar.	Contiloe Entertainment	Disney Channel India	
2008	Bhaago KK Aaya	The sitcom is about the behavior of the character KK in the office with his staff.	Contiloe Entertainment	SAB TV	
2008 – 2010	Kabhi Saas Kabhi Bahu	A woman finds herself in the unique position of being both a daughter-in-law and a mother-in-law, creating humorous role reversals.	Rainmaker Entertainment	DD National	-
2008	Taarak Mehta Ka Ooltah Chashmah	The show is based on the column Duniya Ne Undha Chashma written by columnist and journalist Taarak Mehta.	Neela Tele Films	SAB TV	
2009	Aashiq Biwi Ka	A couple goes through a series of humorous situations as they experience the usual ups and downs in their marital life along with their family members.	Swarp Films PVT LTD	DD National	
2009	Burey Bhi Hum Bhale Bhi Hum	The serial is based on the lives of two brothers with their family who live together in a one house.	Hats Off Productions	Star Plus	
2009	Bhootwala Serial	Vicky inherits his grandfather's old bungalow. He starts a guest house business not realizing that a family of ghosts has made themselves quite at home.	Edit II Productions	Sony Sab	
2009 – 2010	Yeh Chanda Kanoon Hai	A courtroom comedy centered on the humorous clashes between a clever lawyer and her ex-husband, who often faced each other as opposing counsel.	Ideaz Picture Company	SAB TV	
2009 – 2010	Maniben.com	A housewife moves to a posh Mumbai locality and embarks on a humorous journey of self-improvement. She navigates new social circles and pursues unexpected ambitions.	Contiloe Entertainment	SAB TV	
2009 – 2012	Sajan Re Jhoot Mat Bolo	It is a situational comedy that arises from a small lie that the protagonist, Apoorva, had to tell his employer Dhirubhai Jhaveri to get a job.	Optimystix Entertainment	SAB TV	
2009 – 2012	Chorr Police	The story of a thief who steals not for himself, but for other people.	Green Gold Animations	Disney XD India	
2009 – 2014	Lapataganj	Story revolves around people lived in village called ' Lapataganj' and main character is head postmaster Mukundilal gupta.	Garima Productions	SAB TV	
2010	Ring Wrong Ring	The story of a housewife who inherits a peculiar gift a magical ring from her father-in-law.	Anjaney Telefilms Pvt. Ltd. Chitrashala Multimedia	SAB TV	
2010 – 2014	Gutur Gu	Gutur Gu is a silent comedy TV series	Fireworks Productions	SAB TV	
2011	Ammaji Ki Galli	The story is about a person called Ammaji and the lives of people living in a jam-packed street in Amritsar.	Contiloe Entertainment	SAB TV	
2011	Pyaar Mein Twist	The story of two lovers who love each other but end up fighting because of others.	Neela Tele Films	Star Plus	
2011 – 2012	Chintu Chinki Aur Ek Badi Si Love Story	A simple guy from a large family falls for an independent girl, and their romance is complicated by family expectations and comical misunderstandings.	Hats Off Productions	SAB TV	
2011 – 2013	RK Laxman Ki Duniya	The show featured satirical comedy reflecting Indian society, politics, and everyday life. It brought to life Laxman's iconic "Common Man" character and his humorous social commentary..	Hats Off Productions	SAB TV	
2011 – 2016	Best of Luck Nikki	The story is about the birth of character Nikki (fourth child) and how the parents handle the situation after the birth of Nikki.	The Company	Disney Channel India	
2011 – 2017	Chidiya Ghar	The show follows the life of a family of quirky characters whose names resemble animals and each individual bears some animal characteristics.	Sony Pictures Networks	SAB TV	
2012 – 2014	The Suite Life of Karan & Kabir	The show is about Karan and Kabir, twin brothers who live in the Raj Mahal Hotel in Mumbai with their mother.	The Company	Disney Channel India	
2012 – 2013	Alaxmi Ka Super Parivaar	People in story believe that the city will sink if Kapadia family didn't stop fighting with each other.	Hats Off Productions	Life OK	
2012	Motu Patlu	The story is based on two friends who put each other in a situation that leads one into trouble but they also save each other by realizing their own mistakes.	Maya Digital Studios; Cosmos Entertainment	Nickelodeon India	
2013	Shake it up	Two best friends, Neel and Yash, who are passionate dancers. Their dream comes true when they get selected as background dancers on a popular teen dance show called "Shake It Up, Mumbai!".	SOL	Disney Channel India	
2013	Bh Se Bhade	The story is based on a 55-year-old man, Mr. Bhadrakant Devilal Bhade, who has a special quality.	Hats Off Productions	Zee TV	
2013	Hum Aapke Hain In Laws	A young couple who live in a posh locality and are surrounded by families who turn out to be more than neighbours since they are their own in-laws.	Garima Productions	Sony Sab	
2013 – 2014	Oye Jassie	It is a story of Jasmeet(Jassie) from Amritsar who travels Mumbai to become a star where she becomes Nanny for famous film producers adoptive children.	Magic Works Entertainment	Disney Channel India	
2013 – 2017	Nadaniyaan	The story revolves around the innocent, funny, and beautiful stories of a small family of three living in Delhi.	Creative Eye Productions Sagar Pictures	Big Magic	
2014	Tu Mere Agal Bagal Hai	A live audience comedy show which revolves around the lives of the owners and the tenants living under the same roof.	Frames Production Company	SAB TV	
2014	Pritam Pyare Aur Woh	Two bumbling brothers with their equally useless gadgets accidentally solve paranormal cases through a combination of coincidence and sheer luck.	Optimystix Entertainment	SAB TV	
2014 – 2016	Badi Dooooor Se Aaye Hai	The show is about the Aliens who came to India for living with humans.	Hats Off Productions	SAB TV	
2014 – 2016	Yam Hain Hum	Determined to show everyone that he has a good soul, Yam descends to Delhi from Heaven with Chitragupt.	Swastik Pictures	SAB TV	
2014 – 2020	Har Mushkil Ka Hal Akbar Birbal	The show's story is based on the well-known folklore characters, Akbar and Birbal have been extremely popular with the kids for their combined wit and wisdom.	Reliance Broadcast Network; Triangle Film Company	Big Magic	
2015	Zindagi Khatti Meethi	Contrasting neighboring families create comedic chaos through their clashing personalities and lifestyles.	Film Farm Productions	Disney Channel India	
2015	Lage Raho Chachu	A bachelor screenwriter suddenly becomes guardian to three orphans, comically juggling career, romance, and unexpected parenthood.	Contiloe Entertainment	Disney Channel India	
2015	Maan Na Maan Mein Tera Mehmaan	It is a story of a Joint family having a big magical mirror from which different people of various countries, stories and ancient time comes to live and they restore them back to place.	Optimystix Entertainment	Disney Channel India	
2015	Goldie Ahuja Matric Pass	It is a story of a family of 3 where the father rejoins school to complete his studies in the same school where his son is admitted and his wife as the teacher.	The Company	Disney Channel India	
2015	Palak Pe Jhalak	Nysha Kapoor is a teenage girl with a unique ability. She can see segments of the future. This power adds a lot of fun and madness to her life.	Rose Audio Visuals	Disney Channel India	
2015	2025 Jaane Kya Hoga Aage	Set in the near future, the Joshis are a technology-friendly family that loves to potter around with the latest technology.	Optimystix Entertainment	Sony Entertainment Television	
2015	Sahib Biwi Aur Boss	The plot of the series revolves around the female protagonist's struggle to juggle between her married life and work. A desperate Anisha will lie for bagging a job.	Edit II Productions	SAB TV	
2015 – 2016	Chalti Ka Naam Gaadi...Let's Go	The story of the series is about the Ahuja family living in New Delhi. The life of the family takes an interesting U-turn when they buy their first family car Maruti Alto 800.	Deepti Bhatnagar Productions	SAB TV	
2015 – 2016	Sumit Sambhal Lega	A charming but perpetually clumsy man juggles his demanding career with his family life, including his patient wife and young son.	DJ's a Creative Unit	Star Plus	
2015 – 2026	Bhabiji Ghar Par Hain!	A Hindi sitcom that revolves around the lives of two neighboring couples, the show focuses on the humorous interactions between the men, who are both infatuated with each other's wives.	Edit II Productions	&TV	
2016 – 2017	May I Come In Madam Season - 1	This is the story of a man who works under his attractive boss. The show centers around his harmless flirtations with her, which lead to awkward and humorous situations at both his workplace and home.	Edit II Productions	Life OK	
2023 – 2024	May I Come In Madam Season - 2	This is the story of a man who works under his attractive boss. The show centers around his harmless flirtations with her, which lead to awkward and humorous situations at both his workplace and home.	Edit II Productions	Star Bharat	
2016	Gabbar Poonchwala	The story of a dog, Gabbar, who can speak Haryanvi language with the boy called Mihir who found him in the playground.	Contiloe Entertainment	Disney Channel India	
2016	Bade Bhaiyya Ki Dulhania	The story is about 14 family members who trying to find prefect bride for Abhishek, who is the breadwinner of the family.	Bodhi Tree Multimedia	Sony Entertainment Television	
2016	Dr. Madhumati On Duty	In a quirky hospital, a strict doctor clashes with a charming, holistic one, creating humorous situations through their contrasting approaches to medicine.	Optimystix Entertainment	SAB TV	
2016	Woh Teri Bhabhi Hai Pagle	A reformed gangster and a rich brat disguise themselves to win the same doctor's heart, unaware of each other's deception.	Optimystix Entertainment	SAB TV	
2016 – 2017	Trideviyaan	Three housewives lead double lives as secret agents, balancing domesticity with crime-fighting while keeping their identities secret.	Full House Media	SAB TV	
2016 – 2018	Gaju Bhai	The show showcases the story of a Jollywood superstar Gaju Bhai and his transformation from a reel life hero to a real life hero.	Toonz Animation; The Walt Disney Company India	Disney Channel India	
2017 – 2018	Partners	The story revolves around the three cops who solve the cases which leads to laughter.	Ideas Entertainment	SAB TV	
2017 – 2018	Sajan Re Phir Jhooth Mat Bolo	Jaiveer Chopra is a wealthy man who falls in love with a girl named Jaya Lokhande in college. He lies to her and says that he is poor.	Optimystix Entertainment	SAB TV	
2017 — 2019	Kya Haal, Mr. Paanchal?	The story is about a mother who wants a perfect daughter-in-law with five qualities. However, as a result of her wish, she ends up with five daughters-in-laws with one quality each.	Optimystix Entertainment	Star Bharat	
2018	Belan Wali Bahu	A housewife accidentally kills her husband with a rolling pin, after which he returns as a ghost. Together, they navigate family life and try to help their loved ones.	Shoonaya Square Productions	Colors TV	
2018	Saat Phero Ki Hera Pherie	The story revolves around the lives of five neighborhood friends, two couples and one bachelor boy.	Playtime Creationn	SAB TV	
2018	Shrimaan Shrimati Phir Se	This is the second season of Shrimaan Shrimati.	Happii Digital	SAB TV	
2018	Khichdi	The series was first launched in 2002, and aired two seasons. The series, tentatively titled Khichdi Returns.	Hat soff Productions	Star Plus	
2018	Jai Kanhaiya Lal Ki	The arrival of a charming cook transforms a wealthy grandfather and his spoiled granddaughter's lives. This cook eventually wins the granddaughter's heart, leading to their marriage.	Blues Productions	Star Bharat	
2018	Papa By Chance	A carefree young man suddenly becomes the guardian of three orphaned children, drastically changing his lifestyle.	Full House Media	Star Bharat	
2018 – 2020	Jijaji Chhat Par Hai	A young woman and a tenant secretly romance on the roof of her strict father's sweet shop. Their attempts to avoid detection create humorous situations and close calls.	Edit II Productions	SAB TV	
2019	Khatra Khatra Khatra	Comedy game show where celebrities form entertainment and film industry come and play games.	H3 Entertainment	Colors TV	
2019 – 2020	Bhakharwadi	The series revolves around 2 Families who own a Bhakarwadi shop in a Neighborhood. One is the Gujarati Family which has modern thoughts Other is a Marathi Family that believes in Old Thoughts.	Hats soff Productions	Sony SAB	
2019 – 2026	Happu Ki Ultan Paltan	Happu Singh is a police officer in the city of Kanpur. The story revolves around the misadventures of Happu Singh and his large family- his wife.	Edit II Productions	&TV	
2020	Maharaj Ki Jai Ho!	A modern-day thief accidentally time travels to the Mahabharata era, causing comedic chaos with his 21st-century ways. He becomes unintentionally involved in the epic battle between the Pandavas and Kauravas.	The Company; Trouble Makers Productions	StarPlus	
2020	Kuch Smiles Ho Jayein... With Alia	It is a game show in which Alia (from Tera Kya Hoga Alia?) and Balraj connect with the characters of Sony SAB and play fun games.	Ayush Agarwal Productions	Sony Sab	
2020	Akbar Ka Bal Birbal	This show is based on folktales of mighty Mughal Emperor Akbar and his witty and trusted courtier Birbal. This show revolves around Akbar and Birbal's friendship.	Triangle Film Company	Star Bharat	
2020	Excuse Me Maadam	A married man tries to juggle his suspicious wife and his attractive boss, leading to constant cover-ups and comedic misunderstandings.	Edit II Productions	Star Bharat	
2020	Gangs of Filmistaan	The show is based on Bhindi Bhai, who is a don. The don gave his house on rent. But instead of taking rent, he asks them to entertain him.	Lil Frido Productions	Star Bharat	
2020 – 2021	Lockdown Ki Love Story	This series is set against the backdrop of the COVID-19 lockdown. The show tells the story of two young individuals who, despite facing various challenges and restrictions due to the pandemic, fall in love.	Rashmi Sharma Telefilms	Star Plus	
2020 – 2023	Maddam Sir	The show portrays the lives and work of four women police officers, led by a strong and dynamic police officer. They solve various cases with wit and intelligence while dealing with personal and professional challenges.	Jay productions	Sony Sab	
2021	Wagle Ki Duniya – Nayi Peedhi Naye Kissey	This show is based on Rajesh Wagle and his "Common Man Problems"	Hats Off Productions	Sony Sab	
2021	Jijaji Chhat Parr Koii Hai	A comedy-drama about two families at odds over a mansion with a mysterious haunted room. A man plans to marry a woman to acquire the mansion but is thwarted by a ghost who tries to keep them apart, claiming a curse on the family.	Edit II Productions	Sony Sab	
2022 – 2023	Favvara Chowk	The series is based in Indore, revolves around Ashok who runs a Jhama Jham Cafe with his son Manoj and Rama who runs her Madhuri Beauty Parlour with her twin daughters.	H3 Entertainment	Dangal TV	
2023	Meri Saas Bhoot Hai	A girl who is afraid of ghosts but after her marriage she finds that her mother-in-law is a ghost.	Film Farm India	Star Bharat	
2025	Zyada Mat Udd	The heir to an airline must go undercover as a flight attendant to prove himself and secure his inheritance.	Yoodlee Films	Colors TV	

== See also ==
- List of Hindi horror shows
- List of Hindi thriller shows
- List of Indian animated television series
