= Excuse Me Maadam =

Indian comedy TV series

- Genre: Comedy
- Created by: Sanjay Kohli
- Directed by: Sameer Kulkarni
- Starring: Rajesh Kumar; Nyra Banerjee; Sucheta Khanna
- Country of origin: India
- Original language: Hindi
- No. of seasons: 1
- No. of episodes: 67

Production
- Producers: Sanjay Kohli; Benaifer Kohli
- Cinematography: Raja Satankar; Suresh Prasad
- Editors: Shashank Bali; Rahul Solanki; Pravesh Shetty
- Running time: 21 minutes
- Production company: Edit II Production Pvt. Ltd.

Original release
- Network: Star Bharat
- Release: 14 September – 10 December 2020

Excuse Me Maadam is an Indian comedy television series that has been broadcast since 14 September 2020 on Star Bharat and digitally available on Disney+ Hotstar. Produced by Sanjay Kohli, it stars Rajesh Kumar, Nyra Banerjee and Sucheta Khanna. The serial is sequel of Life Ok serial May I Come In Madam?.

== Cast ==
=== Main ===
- Rajesh Kumar as Sanam "Sanu" Harjaayi; Kranti's husband
- Nyra Banerjee as Mithu aka "Maadam"; Sanam's boss
- Sucheta Khanna as Kranti Sanam Harjaayi; Sanam's wife

=== Recurring ===
- Sapna Sikarwar as Inspector Amarjyoti "Amar" Bharati; Kranti's sister
- Anup Upadhyay as Adbhut "Adhu" Bharati; Amar's husband
- Vishwanath Chatterjee as Mr. Chatterjee

== See also ==
- List of Hindi comedy shows
