= Akbar Ka Bal Birbal =

Indian historical comedy show

- Genre: Historical comedy
- Written by: Rakesh Baranwal; Timir Kireet Bakshi; Bunty Rathore; Balwinder Suri
- Screenplay by: Rakesh Baranwal; Bunty Rathore
- Story by: Rakesh Baranwal; Timir Kireet Bakshi
- Directed by: Mukesh Kumar Singh
- Starring: Ali Asgar; Vishal Kotian; Aditi Sajwan; Charu Asopa; Pawan singh Vijhay Badlaani; Rose Sardana; Sumit Arora; Malkhan Singh Gaur
- Theme music composer: Jitesh Panchal
- Country of origin: India
- Original language: Hindi
- No. of seasons: 1
- No. of episodes: 55

Production
- Producers: Nikhil Sinha; Sohanna Sinha
- Cinematography: Karan Indoriya
- Editor: Satya Sharma
- Running time: 20–22 minutes
- Production company: Triangle Films Company

Original release
- Network: Star Bharat
- Release: 31 August – 27 November 2020

Akbar Ka Bal… Birbal (transl. Akbar's Power Birbal) is an Indian Hindi historical comedy television series that aired on Star Bharat between 31 August and 27 November 2020, and was digitally available on Disney+ Hotstar. The show stars Ali Asgar and Vishal Kotian as Akbar and Birbal, respectively, revolving around their friendship. The show is based on folktales of Mughal Emperor Akbar and his witty and trusted courtier Birbal. This show was produced by Nikhil Sinha under the banner of Triangle Film Company.

== Cast ==
- Ali Asgar as Akbar
- Vishal Kotian as Birbal/Insaaf/Mahesh Das
- Aditi Sajwan as Jodha Bai
- Charu Asopa Sen as Tarabai
- Pawan Singh as Salim
- Vijay Badlani as Digvijay Singh
- Rose Sardana as Tilotamma
- Sumit Arora as Rafique
- Malkhan Singh Gaur as Karmaveer
- Nikita Sharma as Ichhadhari Naagin
- Sooraj Thapar as Kaamran (Bairam Khan)
- Manoj Pandey as Sultan Nigah Baksh
- Tanu Vidyarthi as Sultana Begum
- Rajeev Bhardwaj as Fazal Khan
- Dheeraj Miglani as Saala Khan

== Production ==
=== Filming ===
The series was filmed at the historical sets created in Mumbai.

=== Cancellation and resuming ===
The show was abruptly axed midway by the channel on 23 October 2020 due to its low trp. But on 18 November 2020 it started telecasting its remaining few bank episodes on the morning slot.

== Reception ==
The Times of India stated, "A lot of twists with a heavy pinch of entertainment that is what Akbar Ka Bal…Birbal has been. With every new episode, the makers have made sure to keep the audience engaged with their powerful content."

== See also ==
- List of Hindi comedy shows

== See also ==
- Har Mushkil Ka Hal Akbar Birbal
- List of programs broadcast by Star Bharat
