= May I Come In Madam? =

Indian Hindi-language sitcom TV series

- Genre: Comedy
- Written by: Anirudh Madesia; Ankit Carter
- Directed by: Abhishek
- Country of origin: India
- Original language: Hindi
- No. of seasons: 2
- No. of episodes: 486

Production
- Producer: Ankit Carter
- Camera setup: Harjinder
- Running time: 21 minutes
- Production company: Edit ll production

Original release
- Network: Life OK (season 1); Star Bharat (season 2)
- Release: 7 March 2016 – 20 January 2024

Related
- Excuse Me Maadam

May I Come In Madam? is a Hindi-language Indian sitcom. The first season aired on Life OK from 7 March 2016 to 25 August 2017. A second season premiered on 26 September 2023 on Star Bharat.

== Series overview ==
Series	Episodes	Originally released	
Series	Episodes	First released	Last released
1	385	7 March 2016	15 August 2017
2	101	26 September 2023	20 January 2024

== Season 1 ==
The first season of May I Come In Madam? was announced in February 2016. It features Neha Pendse as Sanjana Hiteshi (Madam), Sandeep Anand as Sajan Agarwal (Sanju) and Sapna Sikarwar as Kashmira Agarwal and aired on Life OK from 7 March 2016 to 25 August 2017.

== Season 2 ==
The second season of May I Come In Madam? was announced in July 2023. Neha Pendse, Sandeep Anand and Sapna Sikarwar from the previous season reprised their roles and it premiered on Star Bharat on September 26, 2023. to 20 January 2024

== Related media ==
The producers of the show launched a sequel titled Excuse Me Maadam, which revolves around a similar concept and storyline, however changes were made in the cast as it features Rajesh Kumar as Sanam Harjayi, Nyra Banerjee as Sanam's boss and Sucheta Khanna as Sanam's caring wife. Sapna Sikarwar and Anup Upadhyay are also part of the series. Anup Upadhyay portrays Adhu, who is Sanam's best friend and husband of his sister-in-law Amar, played by Sapna Sikarwar.
