= Yeh Dil Mannge More =

Indian romance drama television series

- Genre: Romance drama
- Created by: Ekta Kapoor
- Developed by: Tanushree Dasgupta
- Screenplay by: Surbhi Saral
- Story by: Prakriti Mukerjee
- Directed by: Khalid Akhtar, Noel S Totan Karmarkar
- Creative director: Dhruv G. Umrania
- Starring: Akshay Mhatre; Twinkle Patel; Sejal Jaiswal
- Country of origin: India
- Original language: Hindi
- No. of seasons: 1
- No. of episodes: 64

Production
- Producers: Ekta Kapoor; Shobha Kapoor
- Cinematography: Maneesh Malik
- Camera setup: Multi-camera
- Running time: 20 minutes
- Production company: Balaji Telefilms

Original release
- Network: DD National
- Release: 15 August 2022 – November 2022

Yeh Dil Mannge More (transl. This Heart Desires More) is an Indian Hindi-language romance drama television series produced by Ekta Kapoor and Shobha Kapoor under Balaji Telefilms. The series stars Akshay Mhatre and Twinkle Patel as protagonists. It premiered on 15 August 2022 on DD National. It went off air in November 2022.

== Plot ==
The series revolves around an army officer and a doctor. It explores how, weighed by their profession, they fight each other, ultimately falling in love.

== Cast ==
- Akshay Mhatre as Major Aryan Singh
- Twinkle Patel as Dr. Jyoti
- Sejal Jaiswal as Sandhya
- Shefali Rana as Kiran Mehra

== See also ==
- List of programs broadcast by DD National
