= Dreams (2005 film) =

2005 film directed by Ashish Chanana

- Directed by: Ashish Chanana
- Written by: Sanjeev Puri
- Produced by: Ashish Chanana
- Starring: Ashish Chanana; Neha Pendse; Arzoo Govitrikar
- Cinematography: Raj Alam
- Edited by: Imtiaz Alam
- Music by: Sajid–Wajid
- Release date: 22 April 2005
- Running time: 185 minutes
- Country: India
- Language: Hindi

Dreams is a 2005 Indian Hindi-language romantic drama film directed by Ashish Chanana starring himself and Neha Pendse.

== Cast ==
- Aashish Chanana as Shekhar
- Neha Pendse as Pooja
- Arzoo Govitrikar as Simran
- Manoj Bidwai as Sameer
- Raju Kher as Pooja's Father

== Music ==
No.	Title	Lyrics	Music	Singer(s)	Length
1.	"Dil Ki Dhadkan"	Jalees Sherwani, Rashid Lakhnavi	Arun Kerkar	Kavita Krishnamurthy
2.	"Duniya Tere Bazaar Mein"	Jalees Sherwani, Rashid Lakhnavi	Arun Kerkar	Pankaj Udhas
3.	"Janey Kahan Leke Jaye Zindagi (Part 1)"	Jalees Sherwani, Rashid Lakhnavi	Sajid–Wajid	Kumar Sanu
4.	"Jaane Kahan Leke Jaaye Zindagi (part 2)"	Jalees Sherwani, Rashid Lakhnavi	Sajid–Wajid
5.	"Nazar Ne Najzr Ko Beya De Diya"	Jalees Sherwani, Rashid Lakhnavi	Sajid-Wajid	Anuradha Paudwal, Babul Supriyo
6.	"Kaise Kaate Raat Din"	Jalees Sherwani, Rashid Lakhnavi	Sajid-Wajid	Sunidhi Chauhan
7.	"Na Jaane Kyun"	Ajay Jhingran	Sajid-Wajid	Abhijeet Bhattacharya, Sneha Pant
8.	"Sapne Sach Honge"	Iqbal Qureshi	Merlin D'Souza	Shaan
9.	"Opening Titles" (Instrumental)

== Reception ==
Film critic Subhash K. Jha gave the film a rating of one out of five stars and wrote that "Films about the heartbreaks of showbiz are always welcome. But not when they break your heart with a complete lack of vision and basic sensibleness in treatment".
