= Tighee =

2026 Marathi film by Jeejivisha Kale

- Theatrical release poster
- Directed by: Jeejivisha Kale
- Written by: Jeejivisha Kale; Screenplay: Nikhil Mahajan; Prajakt Deshmukh
- Produced by: Nikhil Mahajan; Suhrud Godbole; Nehha Pendse Bayas; Swapnil Bhangale; Shardul Singh Bayas
- Starring: Bharati Achrekar; Nehha Pendse Bayas; Sonalee Kulkarni
- Cinematography: Milind Jog
- Edited by: Nikhil Mahajan; Hrishikesh Petwe
- Music by: Advait Nemlekar; Nilesh Moharir
- Production companies: Coquelicot Pictures; Supri Advertising and Entertainment
- Release dates: January 2026 (PIFF); 6 March 2026 (India)
- Running time: 107 minutes
- Country: India
- Language: Marathi

Tighee (transl. Three Women) is a 2026 Indian Marathi-language drama film directed by Jeejivisha Kale in her directorial debut. Produced by Coquelicot Pictures and Supri Advertising and Entertainment, the film stars Bharati Achrekar, Nehha Pendse Bayas and Sonalee Kulkarni in the titular lead roles. The film explores the complex relationship between a mother and her two daughters, addressing themes of familial trauma, abuse, sacrifice and reconciliation.

The film is released on 6 March 2026, coinciding with International Women's Day. Upon release, it received a highly positive response from critics and audiences.

== Plot ==
Hemlata Ranade, an elderly woman living in Pune, is in the final stage of cancer. She has two daughters, Swati and Sarika. Swati, the elder daughter, lives in Mumbai with her husband, Malhar, who is burdened by debt. Having borrowed ₹20 lakh from her employer, Swati is repeatedly sexually harassed by him, who exploits her financial vulnerability. Sarika, meanwhile, has remained in Pune to care for their ailing mother and hopes to launch a startup with her longtime friend, Gandharva.

As Hemlata's health deteriorates, the sisters reunite, bringing unresolved tensions and old wounds to the surface. Swati struggles to disclose the abuse she is experiencing at work, while Malhar's attempts to improve their financial circumstances prove unsuccessful. Sarika resents having sacrificed her career to care for their mother. The sisters also continue to question the disappearance of their father, whom Hemlata had always claimed died in an accident. As Hemlata prepares to leave her home and move into a hospice for her final days, long-buried family secrets begin to emerge.

While rewatching her wedding video, Swati notices her aged father in the footage and confronts Hemlata. Hemlata finally reveals that he had attempted to sexually abuse their daughters during their childhood, prompting her to separate from him and raise them as a single mother. She also reveals that she is aware of the abuse Swati is suffering at the hands of her employer. Hemlata urges Swati to leave her job and report her employer to the authorities.

The revelations deeply affect both sisters, but they eventually reconcile with their mother. Hemlata dies peacefully the following day. After performing her last rites, Swati resigns from her job, while Sarika secures a deal with an investor for her startup. The sisters then travel to a remote village in Konkan to immerse their mother's ashes, where their now elderly father lives alone, unaware of Hemlata's death.

== Cast ==
- Bharati Achrekar as Hemlata Ranade
  - Mrinmayee Godbole as young Hemlata
- Nehha Pendse Bayas as Swati Karnik
- Sonalee Kulkarni as Sarika Ranade
- Nipun Dharmadhikari as Gandharva
- Pushkaraj Chirputkar as Malhar Karnik
- Jaimini Pathak as Swati's boss
- Sanjay Mone as Madhusudan Ranade
  - Suvrat Joshi as young Madhusudan Ranade
- Siddharth Menon as Sarika's friend

== Production ==
The film was shot within 20 days.

== Soundtrack ==
Track list
| No. | Title | Lyrics | Music | Singer(s) | Length |
|---|---|---|---|---|---|
| 1. | "Sharada Sarita" | Jitendra Joshi | Nilesh Moharir | Priyanka Barve | 3:15 |
| 2. | "Haas Jarashi" | Jitendra Joshi | Advait Nemlekar | Sonu Nigam | 3:03 |
| 3. | "Paanha" | Jitendra Joshi | Advait Nemlekar | Sharayu Date | 2:31 |
| 4. | "Paanha Punha" | Jitendra Joshi | Advait Nemlekar | Sharayu Date | 7:56 |
| Total length: | | | | | 16:45 |

== Release ==
The film was selected for the competition section of the 24th Pune International Film Festival (PIFF) in 2026, where it was the only film in the Marathi competition directed by a woman. The first teaser was released on 17 January 2026. The film was theatrically released on 6 March 2026 across 125 screens in Maharashtra, Goa and Bengaluru, with English subtitles. It was later selected as the closing film of the New York Indian Film Festival and was screened at the Goa Marathi Film Festival in August 2026. The film was released for streaming on ZEE5 on 15 May 2026.

== Reception ==
=== Critical response ===
Rahul Desai of The Hollywood Reporter remarked, "But there’s a sense that, despite the specificity of its social fabric, it refuses to alienate the average viewer." Shubhra Gupta of The Indian Express gave the film 2.5 out of 5 stars and stated, "kind of film, revolving around complex, relatable human emotions, that we need more of: the end-note is perhaps most conflicting, leaving us to question our feelings." Nandini Ramnath of Scroll.in observed, "An elephant in the room – a shocking secret – has driven a wedge between Hemalata and Swati. This sensitively handled passage boosts Tighee’s credibility as one of the acutely observed films about childhood trauma and its echoes into adulthood." Anub George of The Times of India rated the film 4 out of 5 stars and praised its performances, writing, "The masterfully written story is given wings by the flawless performances from the three leading ladies. Each essay their roles to perfection, with nuances that will have you tearing up in many scenes." Sakshi Salil Chavan of Outlook India rated the film 4 out of 5 stars, noting, "The film’s unpredictability carries anxiety, hope and anger, cascading through its screenplay at once."

Sreeju Sudhakaran of Rediff rated the film 3.5 out of 5 stars and called it a "must watch", adding, "Its premise may feel familiar, both cinematically and in real life, but the emotional authenticity elevates it." Reshma Raikwar of Loksatta praised the film's screenplay, performances and emotional depth, particularly highlighting Bharati Achrekar, Sonalee Kulkarni and Nehha Pendse, as well as Adwait Nemlekar's music and Milind Jog's cinematography. She described the film as sincere and heartfelt. Santosh Bhingarde of Sakal gave the film 3 out of 5 stars and praised Jog's cinematography. He noted that the first half progresses slowly, but the narrative gains momentum in the second half and becomes more emotionally engaging, describing the film as a sensitive and emotional story with a fluid yet slow-paced narrative. Aashna Nadkarni of Mashable India rated the film 4 out of 5 stars and praised its direction and performances, stating, "Frankly, the movie felt like a fresh breath. A huge kudos to the director and writers for bringing the story so rooted in reality, and not to mention the actors who leave you emotional with their performances."

Srushti Pathak of Social Ketchup described the film as being focused on its characters' emotional journeys, stating, "Tighee is less about plot twists and more about emotional discovery. By the time the story reaches its final turn, the film has quietly built a space where the audience is not just watching these women but feeling alongside them." Sameer Ahire of Movie Talkies rated the film 3.5 out of 5 stars and noted, "There are so many things that you can instantly relate to, and the big reveal in the pre-climax portion works as a huge shocking element." Keyur Seta of The Common Man Speaks gave the film 4 out of 5 stars and praised Kale's direction, wrote, "Kale has presented the drama in a new-age manner. She has displayed maturity in her first feature film itself." Trupti Gaikwad of Navarashtra observed, "This movie seems to be about understanding not only motherhood but also women. But even so, the movie does not seem to support cold feminism anywhere."

Reviewer Keerti Kadam gave the film 4 out of 5 stars and praised Kale's direction and the film's editing, stating, "The director’s sincerity is evident from the beginning, and she keeps the narrative simple yet effective, ably supported by crisp editing." Subhash K. Jha gave the film 4 out of 5 stars, highlighting, "The sequence where the mother tells her daughters she won’t allow them to be defiled a second time is the moment where Tighee acquires its status as a remarkable film." Critic Baradwaj Rangan praised the film's visual presentation and editing, writing, "Tighee is also a beautifully staged film, with evocative camerawork and super-smooth (and at times, very sharp) editing. So much of Tighee works so well that the minor imperfections begin to look like the minor flaws we see in otherwise good people."

=== Accolades ===
| Awards | Year | Category | Recipient | Result | Ref |
|---|---|---|---|---|---|
| New York Indian Film Festival | 2026 | Best Debut Film | Jeejivisha Kale | Nominated | |
| New York Indian Film Festival | 2026 | Best Actress | Bharati Achrekar | Nominated | |
| New York Indian Film Festival | 2026 | Best Screenplay | Nikhil Mahajan, Prajakt Deshmukh | Won | |
| National Indian Film Festival of Australia | 2026 | Best Indie Feature | Tighee (Motherhood) | Won | |
