= Golmaal (2003 film) =

- Official poster
- Directed by: P. N. Ramachandra Rao
- Written by: P. N. Ramachandra Rao
- Produced by: P. N. Ramachandra Rao
- Starring: J. D. Chakravarthy; Ramesh Aravind; Meera Vasudevan; Neha Pendse
- Cinematography: M. V. Raghu
- Edited by: Kotagiri Venkateswara Rao
- Music by: Vandemataram Srinivas
- Production company: Gayatri Kala Chitra
- Release date: 21 February 2003
- Country: India
- Language: Telugu

Golmaal is a 2003 Indian Telugu-language comedy film directed, produced and written by P. N. Ramachandra Rao and starring J. D. Chakravarthy, Ramesh Aravind, Meera Vasudevan and Neha Pendse. This film is a remake of the Malayalam film Malappuram Haji Mahanaya Joji (1994).

== Cast ==
- J. D. Chakravarthy as Amir Khan
- Ramesh Aravind as Amar Sastry
- Meera Vasudevan as Meenakshi
- Neha as Mumtaz
- Jaya Prakash Reddy as Narahari
- Giri Babu as Amir Khan's father
- Brahmanandam as Kokila
- Avinash as Abdullah
- Gundu Hanumantha Rao as Iyer
- Sudhakar
- Padmanabham
- Raghu Babu
- Navabharat Balaji

== Production ==
Meera Vasudevan, whose Hindi film was yet to release, debuted in Telugu cinema with this film.

== Soundtrack ==
The music was composed by Vandemataram Srinivas.

Track listing
No.	Title	Singer(s)	Length
1.	"Aho Aho Khajaraho"	Sunitha, S. P. Balasubrahmanyam	5:42
2.	"Ammayilo"	Devi Sri Prasad, Nishma	4:25
3.	"Muyraa Text Book"	Ramana, chorus	4:44
4.	"Nijam Nijam"	Karthik, Ramana	5:17
5.	"Neredi Kallanta"	Karthik, Usha	4:31
Total length:			24:39

== Reception ==
Gudipoodi Srihari of The Hindu opined that "this film too is quite entertaining with a sort of comedy of errors". Jeevi of Idlebrain.com said that "This film has nothing special to offer. At the same time, it is not boring. It's an average flick that provides good time pass". Manju Latha Kalanidhi of Full Hyderabad criticised the film and gave the film a rating of five out of ten. Telugu Cinema wrote "First of the movie is neither boring nor interesting, it just goes on and the director had given a better treatment in the second half compared to first half".
