= Woh Teri Bhabhi Hai Pagle =

- Genre: Comedy
- Written by: Amit Aryan
- Screenplay by: Vipul D. Shah
- Directed by: Sanjay Satavase; Hemen Chauhan
- Starring: See Below
- Country of origin: India
- Original language: Hindi
- No. of seasons: 1
- No. of episodes: 102

Production
- Executive producer: Prabhat Ranjan
- Producers: Vipul D. Shah; Sanjeev Sharma
- Editor: Hemant Kumar
- Running time: 20 - 24 minutes
- Production company: Optimystix Entertainment

Original release
- Network: SAB TV
- Release: 18 January – 3 June 2016

Woh Teri Bhabhi Hai Pagle is an Indian Hindi-language comedy television series that aired on SAB TV. The series premiered on 18 January 2016 and ended on 3 June 2016. It was produced by Optimystix Entertainment.

== Plot ==
The story centers around two very different men: Nathu Nakabandi, a reformed gangster, and Ranbeer Raichand, a wealthy and spoiled son. They both fall in love Dr. Diya Dilwale.

Dr. Diya, however, has strong prejudices against both types. She dislikes gangsters due to their past, and she despises rich kids who buy their medical degrees instead of earning them.

To impress Dr. Diya, Nathu pretends to be a patient at her hospital, accompanied by his former henchman Babloo. Meanwhile, Ranbeer, in an attempt to win Dr. Diya's affection, also enters the hospital under a false identity, claiming to be a doctor from a humble background.

Both men are unaware of the other's presence and their true intentions. As they navigate this web of lies and deceit, hilarious situations arise. They constantly try to outsmart each other, attempting to expose the other's true identity to Dr. Diya while simultaneously trying to win her heart.

== Cast ==
- Ali Asgar - Nathu Nakabandi / fake patient
- Ashwin Kaushal - Nathu's henchmen
- Krishna Gokani - Dr. Diya Dilwale
- Ather Habib - Ranbeer Raichand / Dr. Ranbeer fake doctor
- Apara Mehta - Diya's mother
- Mahesh Thakur - Mr. Raichand, Ranbir's Father
- Shefali Rana as Sulochana
- Guddi Maruti -
- Monica Castelino as Nurse Angamma
- Rakesh Shrivastav - Multiple Roles
- Sara Khan - Nagin
- Krishna Bhatt - various characters
- Khushboo Shroff - various characters
- Umesh Bajpai - Various characters
- Manju Brijnandan Sharma
- Nirmal Soni - various characters
- Prasad Barve
- Monaz Mewavala - various characters

== See also ==
List of Hindi Comedy Shows
