= Pritam Pyare Aur Woh =

Indian Hindi-language TV series

- Genre: Horror-Comedy; Sitcom
- Written by: Manoj Santoshi
- Screenplay by: Amit Sen Chaudhary
- Directed by: Sanjay Satavase; Hemen Chauhan
- Starring: See Below
- Country of origin: India
- Original language: Hindi
- No. of seasons: 1
- No. of episodes: 110

Production
- Executive producer: Himanshu Thakur
- Producers: Vipul D. Shah; Sanjiv Sharma
- Editor: K. Creation
- Running time: 20–24 minutes
- Production company: Optimystix Entertainment

Original release
- Network: SAB TV
- Release: 3 March – 1 August 2014

Pritam Pyare Aur Woh is an Indian Hindi-language dark comedy horror sitcom television series that aired on SAB TV and was later re-aired on Sony Pal. The series premiered on 3 March 2014 and ended on 1 August 2014. It was produced by Optimystix Entertainment.

== Plot ==
The story centers on the constant rivalry between two brothers Pritam and Pyare, who maintain a running tally of their pranks and one-upmanship in their signature "tit-for-tat" fights. Their lives are intertwined with Tiku Killawala, a wealthy businessman married to their younger sister, Gogi. Tiku deeply loves Gogi, but is constantly exasperated by her brothers' well-intentioned but troublesome ghostly antics. Gogi, in turn, has a soft spot for Pritam and Pyare and often intervenes on their behalf, pressuring Tiku to forgive their misdeeds and preventing him from throwing them out of the house, despite his frustration.

The show's central comedic premise revolves around Pritam and Pyare accidentally solving a ghostbusting case at the beginning of the series, earning them undeserved praise. This leads them to establish a laboratory where they research and create useless yet unique gadgets designed for trapping ghosts. Despite the gadgets' complete ineffectiveness (or even being forgotten at home), the cases are often resolved through coincidental events or the ghosts' own actions. Pritam and Pyare, however, firmly believe that their gadgets are responsible for their success.

To manage the brothers, Tiku employs Mary, a smart, beautiful, and charming secretary tasked with keeping them out of trouble. Pritam and Pyare are both smitten with Mary and constantly try to impress her, but she skillfully keeps them at bay while managing to get her work done. Adding to Tiku's woes is his mother-in-law, Nimmi Gulati, who lives with them and is prone to hallucinations. Tiku endures her eccentricities out of respect for her age.

The series features Rajesh Kumar as Dara Koyla, described as India’s first tall, lean, aristocratic-looking vampire on television. Dressed impeccably in black with a flowing cape, Dara possesses the ability to morph into a bat and hypnotize his victims. He is averse to sunlight and sleeps in his coffin during the day. He is aided by Dumroo, a hunchback (played by Sukesh Anand), and Hatuba, a monster (portrayed by Madan), in his gothic mansion.

== Cast ==
=== Main ===
- Siddharth Sagar as Pritam
- Prasad Barve as Pyare
- Tiku Talsania as Tiku Killawala
- Melissa Pais as Bhootrina
- Rajesh Kumar as Dara Koyla
- Tapasya Nayak Srivastava as Mary D'Souza
- Parineeta Borthakur as Gogi
- Aarti Rana as Jigna
- Daljeet Soundh as Nimmi Gulati

=== Recurring ===
- Dumroo (Sukesh Anand)
- Hatuba (Madan)
- Darpokli
- Neetha Shetty as Sweetrina
- Ami Trivedi as Banjaran
- Vijay Jolekar
- Tadka Shola
- Bhootbola
- Bhootprasad
- Jignesh
- Jamna
- Munni
- Pinto Uncle

== See also ==
- List of Hindi Comedy Shows
