= Undertrial =

- Directed by: Aziz Khan
- Written by: Aadesh K. Arjun, Khaliq Amrohi (dialogues)
- Screenplay by: Nazim Rizvi
- Produced by: Nazim Rizvi
- Starring: Rajpal Yadav; Monica Castelino; Kader Khan; Prem Chopra; Rajesh Puri; Mukesh Tiwari; Pratima Kazmi; Javed Rizvi; Sambhavna Seth; Sunil Rege; Mukesh Bhatt; Ravi Jhankal braus Mewawala; Nafisa Khan
- Cinematography: Tapan K. Basu
- Edited by: Ashfaque Makrani
- Music by: Anu Malik, Shamir Tandon
- Production company: Whispering Shadows Entertainment
- Release date: 9 February 2007
- Running time: 141 minutes
- Country: India
- Language: Hindi

Undertrial is a 2007 Indian Hindi-language crime drama film directed by Aziz Khan. It stars Rajpal Yadav as a man who gets falsely accused of raping his own daughters.

== Plot ==
Sagar Hussain is in jail as an "under trial" prisoner. Sagar's wife Sabeena was proved to be a prostitute who, with her associate's help, put their daughters in the flesh trade. When the elder one resisted due to a call of humanity, they murdered her. Incidentally, the murder scene got recorded in the daughter's mobile phone. The film ends with Sagar being released from jail after being respectfully exonerated by the court of law.

== Cast ==
- Rajpal Yadav as Sagar Hussain
- Monica Castelino as Sabeena Begum
- Kader Khan as Advocate Ravi Vishnoi
- Prem Chopra as Public Prosecutor Anand Verma
- Rajesh Puri as Advocate Apte
- Mukesh Tiwari as Nadir Saab
- Pratima Kazmi as Justice Jaya Reddy
- Javed Rizvi as Tirput
- Sambhavna Seth
- Sunil Rege
- Mukesh Bhatt
- Ravi Jhankal
- Firdaus Mewawala
- Nafisa Khan
- Ghanashyam Nayak as Nattu Jamuddia

== Music ==
- "Kaga Tikulia Le Bhaga" – Anaida
- "Ke Sath" – Sudesh Bhosle
- "Koi Kahe Magan" – Krishna Kalle
- "Lo Gaya Kaam Se" – Sonu Nigam, Alka Yagnik

== Reception ==
Taran Adarsh of IndiaFM gave the film 3 out of 5, writing, "On the whole, UNDERTRIAL has a bold storyline and an engrossing second hour to stay in the viewer's mind." Patcy N of Rediff.com also gave the film 3 out of 5, writing, "Overall I felt the movie had a good plot, but was wasted. The very purpose why this movie was made will not be served. Audience will not go to the theatre to watch Rajpal Yadav as an old haggard old man. But it is indeed a good effort to make public aware of what is happening in our society."
