= List of programs broadcast by Star Bharat =

== Former broadcasts ==
=== Comedy series ===
- Akbar Ka Bal Birbal (2020)
- Excuse Me Maadam (2020)
- Gangs of Filmistaan (2020)
- Jai Kanhaiya Lal Ki (2018)
- Kya Haal, Mr. Paanchal? (2017–2019)
- May I Come In Madam? (season 2) (2023–2024)
- Meri Saas Bhoot Hai (2023)
- Papa By Chance (2018)

=== Drama series ===
- Ajooni (2022–2023)
- Amma Ke Babu Ki Baby (2021)
- Ayushman Bhava (2017)
- Bohot Pyaar Karte Hai (2022)
- Chandrashekhar (2018)
- Channa Mereya (2022)
- Durga Mata Ki Chhaya (2020–2021)
- Dheere Dheere Se (2022–2023)
- Ek Thi Rani Ek Tha Raavan (2019)
- Gud Se Meetha Ishq (2022)
- Gupta Brothers (2020–2021)
- Jiji Maa (2017–2019)
- Kartik Purnima (2020)
- Lakshmi Ghar Aayi (2021)
- Mann Kee Awaaz Pratigya 2 (2021)
- Mayavi Maling (2018)
- Muskaan (2018–2020)
- Na Umra Ki Seema Ho (2022–2023)
- Nimki Mukhiya (2017–2019)
- Nimki Vidhayak (2019–2020)
- Pyaar Ke Papad (2019)
- Saam Daam Dand Bhed (2017–2018)
- Sasural Genda Phool 2 (2021–2022)
- Savdhaan India (2017–2024)
- Saubhagyavati Bhava: * Niyam Aur Shartein Laagu (2023–2024)
- Sufiyana Pyaar Mera (2019)
- Tera Mera Saath Rahe (2021–2022)
- Teri Laadli Main (2021)
- Woh Toh Hai Albelaa (2022–2023)

=== Supernatural series ===
- 10:29 Ki Akhri Dastak (2024–2025)
- Baghin (2024)
- Kaal Bhairav Rahasya (2017–2019)
- Meri Gudiya (2019–2020)
- Shaitani Rasmein (2024–2025)

=== Mythological series ===
- Jag Janani Maa Vaishno Devi – Kahani Mata Rani Ki (2019–2020)
- Jai Kanhaiya Lal Ki (2021–2022)
- Kaamdhenu Gaumata (2025–2026)
- Parshuram (2024)
- RadhaKrishn (2018–2023)

=== Reality series ===
- Om Shanti Om (2017)
- Swayamvar – Mika Di Vohti (2022)

=== Acquired series ===
- Devon Ke Dev...Mahadev (2018–2021)
- Dr. Babasaheb Ambedkar (2020)
- Khichdi (2020)
- Krishna (2020)
- Mahabharat (2020)
- Ramayan (2020–2021)
- Sarabhai vs Sarabhai (2020)
- Siya Ke Ram (2018)
- Kiranmala (2024)
- Maha Kumbh: Ek Rahasaya, Ek Kahani (2024)
- Mahabharat (2024)
- Ek Hasina Thi (2024)
- Naagarjuna – Ek Yoddha (2024)
- Karmadhikari Shanidev (2024)
