= Shefali Rana =

Indian television and film actress

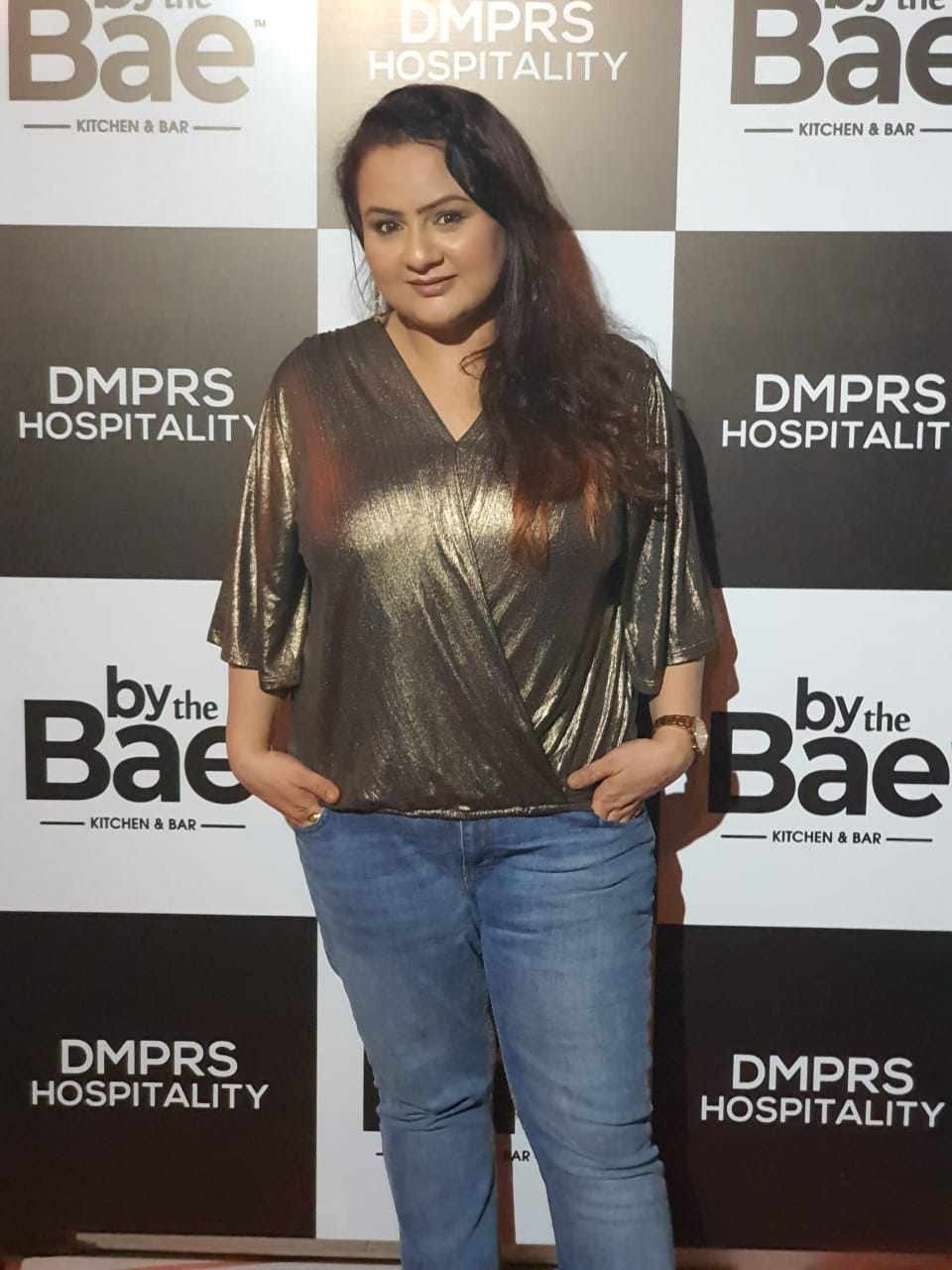
- Rana on the launch of By The Bae Restaurant
- Born: Delhi, India
- Occupation: Actress
- Years active: 2002–present

Shefali Rana is an Indian television and film actress. She is best known for her role of Asha in the television series Mariam Khan - Reporting Live.

== Personal life ==
Rana is from Delhi. Her mother, Usha Rana is also an Indian television and film actress.

== Career ==
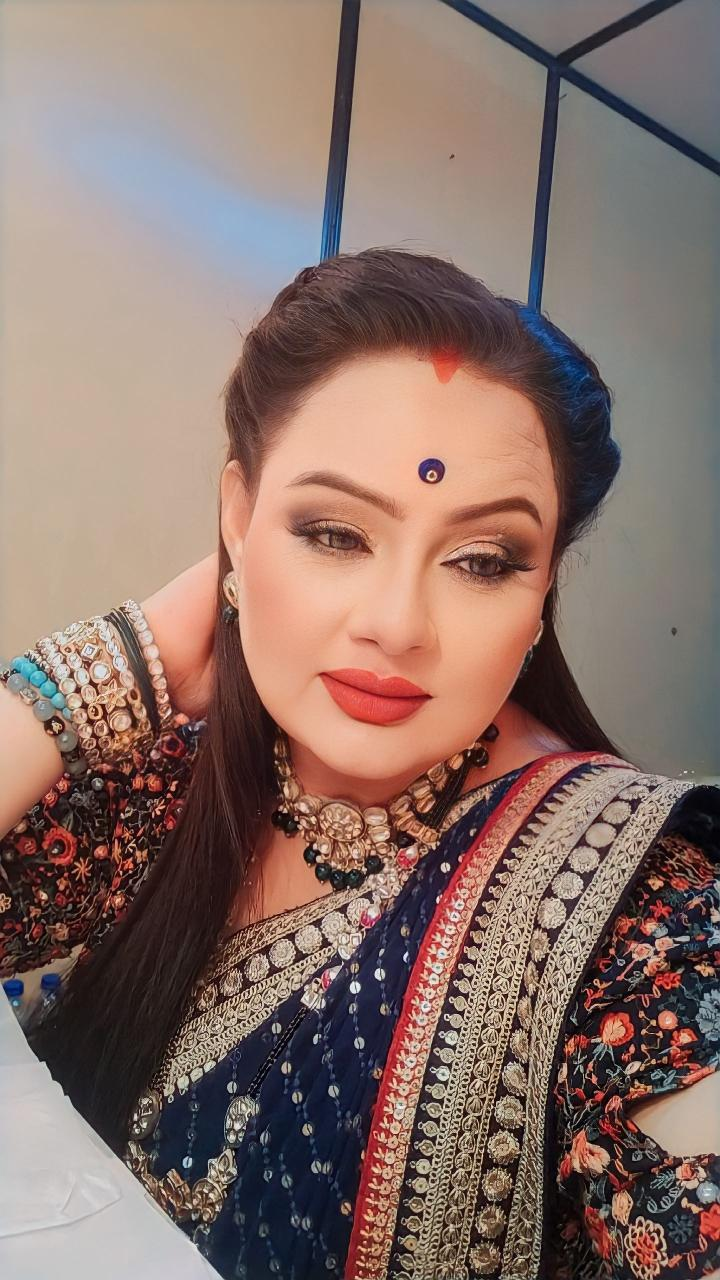
Shefali Rana on the set of sindoor ki kimat 2

Rana played the role of Ranveer's aunt in the series Ek Vivah Aisa Bhi.

She also played the role of Gayatri in the 2018 film Nanu Ki Jaanu.

She also had roles in the Hindi television serials Balika Vadhu, Ishq Subhan Allah as Tabassum, Peehar, Kitani Mohabbat Hai, Dharti Ki God Mein, Y.A.R.O Ka Tashan, Woh Teri Bhabhi Hai Pagle, Tedi Medi Family, Ajab Gajab Ghar Jamai, Aadha Full as Beauty, Doli Armano Ki and Choti Sarrdaarni, Gudiya Hamari Sabhi Pe Bhari, Haiwaan: The Monster Ghar Ek Mandir- Kripa Agrasen Maharaja Ki, Iss Pyaar Ko Kya Naam Doon? Ek Baar Phir as Mangala, Ssshhhh...Koi Hai, Maddam Sir as Fake Pushpa Singh, Mast Mauli as Rohan's mother, Yeh Dil Mannge More as Kiran Mehra, Sindoor Ki Keemat as Madhu, Badall Pe Paon Hai as Poonam Khanna and as young Shakuntala Chawla in Lovely Lolla.

== Filmography ==
=== Film ===
Year	Title	Role	Notes
2003	Pinjar	Pagli's friend	
2004	Satya Bol	Mrs. Sawant	
2010	Pyaar Impossible!	Jashmit	
2018	Nanu Ki Jaanu	Gayatri	

=== Television ===
Year	Title	Role	Notes
2002	Ssshhhh...Koi Hai		
2002	Urmila	Guddi	
2002	Chacha Chaudhary	Sonila	
2010	Balika Vadhu		
2010	Kitani Mohabbat Hai 2	Cheeku's mother	Season 2
2013	Iss Pyaar Ko Kya Naam Doon? Ek Baar Phir	Mangala	
2014	Ajab Gajab Ghar Jamai		
2014	Doli Armaano Ki	Chhavi	
2015	Tedi Medi Family	Massi	
2016	Woh Teri Bhabhi Hai Pagle	Sulochana	
2016	Y.A.R.O. Ka Tashan	Prem's mother	
2016	Aadha Full	Beauty	
2017	Ek Vivah Aisa Bhi	Nupur Mittal	
2018	Mariam Khan – Reporting Live	Asha Mehta	
2019	Ishq Subhan Allah	Tabassum	
2020	Haiwaan: The Monster		
2020	Maddam Sir	Fake Pushpa Singh	
2021	Gudiya Hamari Sabhi Pe Bhari	Gudiya's Taiji	
2021	Choti Sarrdaarni	Shekhar Kaul's mother	
2021	Ghar Ek Mandir- Kripa Agrasen Maharaja Ki	Suman Agrawal	
2022	Yeh Dil Mannge More	Kiran Mehra	
2023	Mast Mauli	Gayatri	
2023	Sindoor Ki Keemat 2	Madhu Shukla	Season 2
2024	Badall Pe Paon Hai	Poonam Khanna	
2025–present	Tu Juliet Jatt Di	Neelu Sandhu	
2026–present	Sayoneee	Malani	

=== Web series ===
Year	Title	Role	Notes
2024	Lovely Lolla	young Shakuntala Chawla	
