= Monica Castelino =

Indian former actress (born 1982)

- Years active: 1997–2020
- Spouse: Satyaprakash Singh (m. 2010, divorced)

Monica Castelino is an Indian former actress, who has primarily appeared in the Hindi film industry. After portraying the lead role in the Tamil film Minsara Kanna (1999), Castelino appeared in glamorous roles in Hindi films throughout the 2000s. In the 2010s, she worked on several Hindi television shows including The Kapil Sharma Show (2017).

== Career ==
After portraying a supporting role as the protagonist's sister in the Hindi film Kaalia (1997), Castelino made her debut in a lead role through K. S. Ravikumar's 1999 Tamil romantic thriller film Minsara Kanna, appearing opposite Vijay in a leading role. Simran was the first choice to play as lady lead, but due to her other commitments she opted out and Castelino was subsequently signed on. She shot with the team in Chennai, Switzerland and Germany, notably filming the "Un Per Solla" song in the Alps. The film opened to average reviews and collections at the box office, with the actress gaining mixed reviews for her work. She briefly changed her stage name to Anjani/Madhuri for numerological reasons, before reverting to Monica.

Her last successful movie, "Mo mana khali tori paen", was opposite Sidhant Mohapatra. Castelino played a glamorous lead role in a low budget Hindi adult film Kama Sundari, before playing a similar supporting role in Meri Partigya, which had Mithun Chakraborty in the lead role. She was later seen in an item number in Shikaar (2004), performing a club dance song in the climax of the film. In 2004, she signed on to work on Men Not Allowed, where she portrayed a lesbian woman in love with a woman portrayed by Payal Rohatgi. She then continued to play glamorous roles in Hindi films in the late 2000s.

In the 2010s, Castelino moved on to portray roles in television serials and notably featured in Tu Mere Agal Bagal Hai (2014), Dr. Madhumati On Duty (2016) and Gupp Chupp (2016) in lead roles. She regularly also worked on shows produced by Optimystix Entertainment. In 2017, she joined the Hindi comedy programme, The Kapil Sharma Show, as a regular cast member.

== Personal life ==
Castelino was married to an assistant director, Satyaprakash Singh, in 2010. The pair separated within a year after she complained of his adultery and harassment.

== Filmography ==
Feature films

List of feature film credits
Year	Title	Role	Language	Notes
1997	Kaalia	Kala	Hindi	
1999	Minsara Kanna	Aishwarya	Tamil	
2000	Madhuri	Madhuri	Telugu	credited as Anjana
2001	Kama Sundari	Sundari	Hindi	
2002	Meri Partigya	Herself	Hindi	Special appearance in item song
2004	Shikaar	Herself	Hindi	Special appearance in item song
2005	Mo Mana Khali Tori Paene	Herself	Odia	Special appearance in item song
2006	Men Not Allowed	Urmila	Hindi	
2006	Rafta Rafta – The Speed	Shilpa	Hindi	
2007	Undertrial	Sameena Hussain	Hindi	

Television

List of television credits
Year	Title	Role	Notes
2009	Mann Kee Awaaz Pratigya		
2009	Maniben.com		
2010	Pyaar Kii Ye Ek Kahaani	Miss Shanaya	
2011	R. K. Laxman Ki Duniya		
2011	Rishton Ke Bhanwar Mein Uljhi Niyati	Sharmila	
2012	Haunted Nights		
2014	Tu Mere Agal Bagal Hai	Victoria Bai	
2014	Comedy Classes		
2014	Akbar Birbal	Rupali / Roop	
2015	The Great Indian Family Drama		
2015	2025 Jaane Kya Hoga Aage	Monica	
2016	Woh Teri Bhabhi Hai Pagle		
2016	Dr. Madhumati On Duty		
2016	Gupp Chupp	Lovely Kohli	
2017	Har Mard Ka Dard	Mallika	
2017	The Kapil Sharma Show	Various roles	
2017	Y.A.R.O Ka Tashan	Sushmitha Kapoor	
2017	Aadat Se Majboor	Ranjan's fake wife	
2017	Partners	Phullorani	
2018	Khichdi	Premavarsha	
2020	Maharaj Ki Jai Ho!	Gandhari	
