= Bhanwar (Indian TV series) =

- Original language: Hindi
- No. of seasons: 2

Production
- Producer: TV18
- Running time: approx. 40 minutes

Original release
- Network: Sony TV
- Release: 1998 – 24 May 2015

Bhanwar (transl. Whirlpool) is a television docudrama series based on judgments from the Indian judicial system. The series was produced by TV18 and was originally telecast on Sony Entertainment Television in 1998–2015.

Bhanwar which aired in the late 1990s on Sony TV was a one-of-a-kind show which dealt with landmark judgements from the Indian judicial system. Produced by TV18, the series ran for two years on Sony TV. It was directed by Sanjay Ray Chaudhari and written by Sanjeev Sharma and Sanjay Chauhan. The show was so popular it was re-aired on SAB TV and Fox History. It received the Special Jury Award for Best Investigative Show at the 1998 Screen Awards.

== Second Season ==
In 2015 the show returned to Sony TV with brand new judicial decisions. It was produced by Siddharth Malhotra, Cinevistaas Ltd. and Contiloe Entertainment. The show premiered on 10 January 2015.

== Cast ==
- Amit Tandon as Advocate Rohit Rajput
- Pooja Sharma as Surbhi
- Manish Naggdev as Mahesh Mallik
- Surendra Pal
- Tapasya Nayak Srivastava
- Raj Singh Verma
- Tarun Khanna
- Tunisha Sharma
- Faisal Khan
- Jiten Lalwani
- Tanvi Thakkar
- Vineet Raina
- Parul Chaudhary
- Yashashri Masurkar
- Ankit Gera
- Ankita Bhargava
- Akhil Mishra as Ahmed
- Ribbhu Mehra as Magician
- Tiya Gandwani as Nidhi Taneja (Episode 2)
- Arun Bali as Shankar Lal (Season 1)
- Rajat Kapoor (Season 1)
- Vijay Raaz (Season 1)
- Irrfan Khan as keval Krishna Gupta (Lawyer) Season-1
- Gajraj Rao Season-1
- Kay Kay Menon Season-1,2
- Preeti Singh as Anushka (Episode 4)

== See also ==
- Geeta and Sanjay Chopra kidnapping case
