= Ganj Dundawara =

- Town
- Ganj Dundwara
- Location in Uttar Pradesh Location in India
- Coordinates: 27°43′58″N 78°56′30″E
- Country: India
- State: Uttar Pradesh
- District: Kasganj
- Named for: Market (Ganj) near Dundawara village

Government
  - Type: Council government
  - Body: Nagar Palika Parishad Ganj Dundwara.
  - Chair Man: Haji Munawwar Hussain (SP)

Area
  - Total: 2.59 km^{2} (1.00 sq mi)
- Elevation: 166 m (545 ft)

Population (2011)
  - Total: 45,385
  - Density: 17,500/km^{2} (45,400/sq mi)
- Demonym: Ganjdundawarawasi

Language
  - Official: Hindi
  - Additional official: Urdu
- Time zone: UTC+5:30 (IST)
- PIN: 207242
- Telephone code: 05740
- Vehicle registration: UP-87
- Website: www.ganjonline.com

Ganj Dundawara, also known as Ganj Dundwara, is a town and a municipal board in Patiyali tehsil, Kasganj District, Aligarh division in the state of Uttar Pradesh, India.

== Etymology ==
The name Ganj Dundawara is derived from 'Ganj', meaning market or trading centre, and 'Dundawara', the name of the original village.

== Geography ==
Ganj Dundawara is located at 27.43°N latitude and 78.56°E longitude. It has an average elevation of 166 m (545 ft). The city is situated in the Indo-Gangetic plain. The Ganges is the nearest (8 km [5.0 mi]) holy river to the city. The town is located in the middle of Ganga-Yamuna doab

=== Climate ===
Ganj Dundawara has a humid subtropical climate. The winters are moderate. The summers are very hot and dry, with temperatures regularly exceeding 35 °C (95 °F) and climbing well past 40°C (104 °F) to 43°C (109.4°F). The monsoon season runs from the end of June to September. During the monsoon season, almost daily showers are a common phenomenon. From October onward, the weather is pleasant. Proper winter begins in early December.

== Demographics ==
As per the 2011 Indian Census, Ganj Dundawara had a total population of 45,385, of which 23,801 were males and 21,584 were females. Population within the age group of 0 to 6 years was 6,746. The total number of literates in Ganj Dundawara was 23,245, which constituted 51.2% of the population, with male literacy of 55.7% and female literacy of 46.3%. The effective literacy rate of 7+ population of Ganj Dundawara was 60.2%, of which male literacy rate was 65.4% and female literacy rate was 54.4%. The Scheduled Castes population was 4,361. Ganj Dundawara had 6981 households in 2011.

According to the 2001 India census, Ganj Dundawara had a population of 41,245, with 53% males and 47% female. It had an average crude literacy rate of 44%, lower than the national average of 59.5%: male literacy is 51%, and female literacy is 38%. 18% of the population was under 6 years of age.

=== Religion ===
Religion in Ganj Dundwara town (2011)
1. Muslim (55.3%)
2. Hindu (44.1%)
3. Others (0.62%)

Majority of the population of Ganj Dundawara town are adherents of Islam, followed by a large Hindu minority.

== Government and politics ==
Ganj Dundawara has a municipal corporation named as Nagar Palika Parishad Ganj Dundwara. Haji Munavvar Hussain of the Samajwadi Party is current mayor of Nagar Palika Parishad, Ganj Dundawara. It is divided into 25 wards for which elections are held every 5 years.

The town comes under the Patiyali Assembly constituency of Etah Lok Sabha constituency.

== Transport ==
Ganj Dundawara is situated on the Kanpur -Kasganj- Mathura electrified railway line. Trains are available to various major cities. The main express train which stops at Ganj Dundawara is the Ahmedabad-Gorakhpur Express (19409/19410). The town is connected to the district headquarters, Kasganj, by railway and road. UPSRTC provides various bus services from Ganj Dundawara to Badaun (45 km [27.96 mi] , Etah (38 km [24 mi]), Delhi (250 km [160 mi]), Agra (120 km [75 mi]), Aligarh (90 km [56 mi]) and Bareilly (100 km [62 mi]).

== Notable people ==
- Anup Upadhyay – stage, film and television actor
