= Har Mard Ka Dard =

- Genre: Sitcom
- Created by: Tony Singh; Deeya Singh
- Directed by: Parmeet Sethi
- Country of origin: India
- Original language: Hindi
- No. of seasons: 1
- No. of episodes: 109

Production
- Producers: Tony Singh; Deeya Singh
- Production locations: Mumbai, India
- Camera setup: Multi-camera
- Production company: DJ's a Creative Unit

Original release
- Network: Life OK
- Release: 14 February – 14 July 2017

Har Mard Ka Dard (transl. Every Man's Pain) is an Indian Hindi sitcom that originally aired on Life OK from 14 February 2017 to 14 July 2017. The series is produced by DJ's a Creative Unit of Tony Singh and Deeya Singh and directed by Parmeet Sethi.

== Cast ==
- Faisal Rashid as Vinod Khanna
- Jinal Belani as Sonu Tanna Khanna
- Vaishali Thakkar as Vinod's Mother
- Karan Singh Chhabra as Monty Singh
- Prabhjeet Kaur as Vinod's Sister/Kannu
- Anita Kanwal as Vinod's Grandmother
- Mansi Multani as Pari
- Monica Castelino as Malika/Sonu's Friend/Sonu's neighbour
- Suresh Kumar Rana
- Munish Kumar

• Pragya Sethi as Bunty

Akash makhija – Dj bunnu
