= Maharaj Ki Jai Ho! =

Indian 2020 television series

- Genre: Science fiction Sitcom
- Created by: David Polycarp
- Written by: David Polycarp; Inaamulhaq
- Screenplay by: Yuvraj Pandey
- Story by: David Polycarp; Shubham Sharma; Vera Raina
- Directed by: Deven Bhojani
- Creative directors: Rakesh Tak; Arvind Jadhav; Rahul Lawhe
- Starring: Satyajeet Dubey
- Country of origin: India
- Original language: Hindi
- No. of seasons: 1
- No. of episodes: 50

Production
- Producers: David Polycarp; Vasant Valsan; Sanket Vanzara
- Cinematography: Raju Goli
- Editor: Hemant Kumar
- Camera setup: Multi camera
- Running time: 22 minutes
- Production company: Trouble Maker Productions

Original release
- Network: StarPlus; Star Utsav
- Release: 23 March – 20 May 2020

Maharaj Ki Jai Ho! (Hail the King!) is an Indian television science fiction sitcom series that ran from 23 March 2020 to 20 May 2020 on StarPlus, later shifted to Star Utsav and streams on digital platform Disney+ Hotstar. It starred Satyajeet Dubey in the main lead role of Sanjay. The telecast of the show was hampered due to its low ratings during COVID-19 pandemic and the show had to decline without completing its story in May 2020.

== Plot ==
Sanjay, a small-time pickpocket hailing from Delhi travels back in time via a portal accidentally opened by the time machine of scientist Dr. Albert D'Souza to the period of Mahabharat during Dhritarashtra's reign in Hastinapur and causes chaos in the region. Sanjay crosses path with Sunaina, a thief (later revealed to be the Princess of Suryagarh) and love blossoms between them. Sanjay's journey afterwards is one of comedy and romance taking place in his life there and his eventual escape.

== Cast ==
- Satyajeet Dubey as Sanjay Arora: A petty con-man from Delhi
- Ashwin Mushran as Dr. Albert D'Souza: Scientist who creates the time machine
- Riya Sharma as Sunaina: Suryabhan's Daughter
- Nitesh Pandey as Dhritarashtra: The king of Hastinapur
- Aakash Dabhade as Shakuni
- Rajesh Kumar as King Suryabhan: The enemy of King Dhritarashtra
- Monica Castelino as Gandhari: Dhritarashtra's wife; The queen of Hastinapur
- Abhishek Avasthi as Dhritarashtra's Senapati
- Sumit Arora as Suryabhan's Senapati
- Wahib Kapadia as Pratap a.k.a. Pappu: Suryabhan's son
- Vaishnavi Rao as Padma, Sunaina's friend
- Sulakshana Khatri as Mandakini
- Maera Mishra as Sweety

== Production ==
=== Development ===
The first promo of the series was released on 19 March 2020.

After the end of Kahaan Hum Kahaan Tum, Anupamaa was supposed to take the slot from 16 March 2020. Due to the outbreak of COVID-19, as the shootings were stalled, its launch was pushed due to inadequate bank episodes and Maharaj ki Jai Ho! got the slot to premiere on 23 March 2020 as there was a bank of about 50 episodes.

=== Casting ===
Satyajeet Dubey was cast as the main lead Sanjay, returning to television after nine years. Speaking about his role, he said, "I play Sanjay in Maharaj Ki Jai Ho, which is a situational comedy. My character is that of a rangeela, street-smart punter. Somehow, he goes back in time by 5,000 years and that's what piqued my interest." Besides Ashwin Mushran, Nitesh Pandey, Aakash Dabhade, Rajesh Kumar, Clair Castelino, Riya Sharma and Abhishek Awasthy were cast.
