= Inidhu Inidhu Kadhal Inidhu =

- Poster
- Directed by: Sakthi Chidambaram
- Story by: Srinu Vaitla
- Based on: Anandam by Srinu Vaitla
- Produced by: Ramoji Rao
- Starring: Jai Akash; Neha; Hamsavardhan; Monica
- Cinematography: Balasubramaniem
- Music by: Devi Sri Prasad
- Production company: Usha Kiran Movies
- Release date: 8 May 2003
- Running time: 158 minutes
- Country: India
- Language: Tamil

Inidhu Inidhu Kadhal Inidhu (transl. Sweet, sweet, love is sweet) is a 2003 Indian Tamil-language buddy romance film directed by Sakthi Chidambaram, and produced by Ramoji Rao. A remake of the 2001 Telugu film Anandam, it stars Jai Akash reprising his role from the original, alongside Neha, Hamsavardhan, and Monica. The film was released on 8 May 2003.

== Cast ==
- Jai Akash as Sibi (voice dubbed by Vishwa Viswanathan)
- Neha Pendse as Mamathi
- Hamsavardhan as Ajay
- Monica as Deepika
- Nassar
- Livingston
- Vadivelu as Karuppu
- Karunas
- Pyramid Natarajan
- Thalaivasal Vijay
- Chitti Babu
- Singamuthu
- Bonda Mani as Thavakalai
- Chaams
- Crane Manohar
- Chaplin Balu
- Nellai Siva
- Balaji
- Simran in a guest appearance ("Naan Puttam Pudiyai")

== Production ==
The venture was a remake of the Srinu Vaitla's successful 2001 Telugu film Anandam, with the lead actor Jai Akash retained in his role.

== Soundtrack ==
Soundtrack was composed by Devi Sri Prasad, with lyrics written by Vairamuthu. The song "Anandam" from the original was replaced with "Azhaguda". One of the title songs "Inithu Inithu" was additionally composed.

Song	Singers
"Azhaguda"	Shankar Mahadevan
"Inithu Inithu"	Sumangali, S. P. B. Charan
"Kadhal Enbathu"	Mallikarjun, Sumangali
"Lovvunna Enna"	Devi Sri Prasad, Mallikarjun, Sumangali
"Naan Putham Puthiya"	Sumangali
"Siragulla I"	S. P. Balasubrahmanyam, K. S. Chithra
"Siragulla II"	Prathap Chandran

== Reception ==
Malathi Rangarajan of The Hindu revealed "the film drags on for 45 minutes — absolutely exasperating". Malini Mannath of Chennai Online wrote "The Director does make some attempts to give some little touches that would make his narration interesting. But there are too many lagging moments in the film". Visual Dasan of Kalki wrote even though the screenplay destroys our belief that the title is like a poem and the subject is like that, the scenes are saving us.
