= Premasathi Coming Suun =

- Premasathi Coming Suun First Look Poster
- Written by: Chinmay Kulkarni
- Produced by: Anup Kumar Poddar, Aman Vidhate, Sanjay Sankla, Mulchand Dedhia
- Starring: Neha Pendse; Adinath Kothare; Jitendra Joshi
- Music by: Pankaj Padghan
- Release date: 12 December 2014
- Running time: 135 minutes
- Country: India
- Language: Marathi

Premasathi Coming Suun (Marathi:प्रेमासाठी Coming सून) is a 2014 Marathi comedy about Aditya (Adinath Kothare), a young man in his early twenties whose family is looking for a bride for him, and Antara (Neha Pendse), the prospective bride with a hidden agenda.

== Reception ==
Professional ratings
Review scores
Source	Rating
Book My Show	5/5 stars

Premasathi Coming Suun was met with favorable reviews. Bookmyshow.com gave it 2 out of 5 stars, calling it "a neat and clean comedy".

== Cast ==
- Neha Pendse as Antara
- Adinath Kothare as Aditya
- Jitendra Joshi as Kolte Patil
- Resham Tipnis as Antara's Mami
- Vijay Patkar as Antara's Mama
- Suhas Joshi as Aditya's Aaji
- Anchal Poddar

== Music ==
=== Soundtrack ===
No.	Title	Lyrics	Music	Singer	Length
1.	"Bawara"	Chetan Dange	Pankaj Padghan	Mangesh Bandodkar	4:20
2.	"Halad"	Chetan Dange	Pankaj Padghan	Sayali Pankaj	5:10
3.	"Ala Majha ganraya"	Chetan Dange	Pankaj Padghan	Jaydeep Bagwadkar	4:40
4.	"Ali Gulabo"	Chetan Dange	Pankaj Padghan	Neha Lele	4:10
