= Minsara Kanna =

1999 film by K. S. Ravikumar

- Theatrical poster
- Directed by: K. S. Ravikumar
- Screenplay by: K. S. Ravikumar
- Story by: M. A. Kennedy
- Produced by: K. R. Gangadharan
- Starring: Vijay; Khushbu; Rambha; Monica
- Cinematography: Ashok Rajan
- Edited by: K. Thanigachalam
- Music by: Deva
- Production company: K. R. G Movies International
- Release date: 9 September 1999
- Running time: 159 minutes
- Country: India
- Language: Tamil

Minsara Kanna (transl. Electrifying darling) is a 1999 Indian Tamil-language romantic comedy film directed by K. S. Ravikumar. The film stars Vijay, Khushbu, Rambha and Monica. Manivannan, Karan, R. Sundarrajan and Mansoor Ali Khan play supporting roles. The story is about how Kasi (Vijay) gets employed in Indira Devi's (Khushbu) house and develops romance towards Ishwarya (Monica), Indira Devi's sister.

Minsara Kanna was shot mostly in Ooty, Austria, Germany, and Switzerland. The film has music composed by Deva and cinematography by Ashok Rajan. It was released on 9 September 1999 and failed at the Tamil Nadu box office but won the Tamil Nadu State Film Award for Best Audiographer.

== Plot ==
Indira Devi is a misandrist business tycoon based in Ooty. She lives in a mansion with her assistant and PA Priya. Indira Devi runs a garment business in which all of her employees are females, and even electricians are females. She has a strong dislike to the male gender due to a tragic past. Some of the women who work in her estates and houses are married but hide this from her. She has a long-standing rivalry with Vedachalam, another businessman in the town, who end up swindling his own wealth and reputation to sabotage Indira Devi, due to his assistants' foolishness.

The story shifts to Kasi, a young man who does any jobs that come to him for survival and cooks up a long story of trying to locate his father. He does so by naming individuals using city names to confuse the listener and irritate them. He does this once to the policemen who chase him for unknown reasons. Kasi ends up in Indira Devi's house to escape the police and in turn, he sees goons threatening Indira Devi for money. Kasi fights them and saves the ladies, which Indira doesn't bring herself to appreciate this. Indeed, the goons are sent by Vedachalam and he is arrested. Priya takes an instant liking for Kasi. In a turn of events, Indira Devi has no choice but to appoint Kasi as her driver, something that astonishes the female staffs.

Indira's younger sister Ishwarya comes back from Germany after studies and is instantly at logger-heads with Kasi. Priya falls in love with Kasi. Once, a few goons stand on the compound wall and tease Ishwarya, prompting Indira Devi to consider a Gurkha. Kasi and the appointed Gurkha duel and Indira comes to a conclusion that both of them are equally strong. A young boy is then appointed as a helper in Indira Devi's household. Meanwhile, Vedachalam's son, Ashok is a friend of Ishwarya from Germany and is in love with her. Vedachalam plans to use Ashok to usurp Indira's wealth by marrying her sister Ishwarya to Ashok. He reaches Indira's house to talk about plans for an engagement between Ishwarya and Ashok, but is chased away by Kasi and Indira. Ishwarya tells Indira that she is not in love with anyone, but Kasi doubts it. Later, a cook and his daughter are appointed in the house. It then is revealed that Kasi's real name is Kannan, the cook is his father Devanathan, the Gurkha is his elder brother Krishna, the server boy is his younger brother Vetri, the cook's daughter is Kannan's sister Bhavana. They have come to Indira's house with a mission. Priya overhears this, but Kasi and his family tell a secret to her and she vows to help them.

Kasi slowly becomes Indira's trustworthy person and is elevated to be appointed as the factory manager. Indira starts respecting him. Ishwarya once appoints a man to work in the factory and Indira throws him out, reprimanding Ishwarya. As part of the plan, Kasi and Priya do a romantic dance infuriating Indira who fires them both. Before leaving, Kasi makes Indira to understand and realise the importance of men and women being together and how the society wrongly see single women, even if they are clean. Indira thinks about it and plans to arrange Ishwarya's wedding with Ashok. An overwhelmed Ashok runs to meet Ishwarya, but is shocked to see her with Kasi aka Kannan instead. Considering Ashok as her best friend, Ishwarya tells Ashok about herself and Kannan. Kannan hails from a rich and wealthy family and is from Germany as well. He gets acquainted with Ishwarya and they fall in love. Ishwarya tries to commit suicide as she cannot live without Kannan nor live with him. When asked, she then reveals about Indira Devi, her past and her lover, Indra Kumar, who is revealed to be the man she and Kasi had later on appointed to work at Indira's factory.

Indira worked as a tailor and lived in a hut with Ishwarya. Once, the hut catches fire and Indira is unable to leave the hut as she becomes naked after her clothes catch fire. When men refuse to leave the premises due to them putting out the fire, Indira gets trapped and her face is scarred due to the fire. She is rescued and is refused by Indra who marries another woman, revealing that Indra only loved her beauty. Indira then ended up having a great dislike for males after these incident and witnessing Ishwarya begging for food and shunned by men. She starts a feminist movement with her tailoring business and grows successful in it. Ishwarya says that her sister would never approve her relationship and she too cannot oppose her sister. The family then plan to change Indira's mind by going to her home and infilitrating her life in order to convince her. Ashok, who upon having learnt of the truth of Kannan & Ishwarya's genuine love over the many sacrifices that Kannan's family took to get the two of them together, ends up sacrificing his own love and wishing them luck.

Things take a turn when a woman, whose photo Devanathan had used to fool Indira as his deceased wife, is spotted and noticed by Indira. Kannan's plans are ultimately revealed to her and the group is unfortunately arrested. Indira also learns of Ishwarya's love and then forces her to have her marriage done with Ashok. A fight between Kannan, Krishna, and Devanathan againest with Vedachalam's henchmen ensues. Indira threatens Ishwarya with her life, and Ishwarya locks herself in a room. Kannan gives up after Devanathan accuses Ishwarya of struggling between her love for Indira and Kannan. Ishwarya then tries to commit suicide. Kannan sings the love song, 'Unn Per Solla Aasai Thaan', prompting Ishwarya to come running towards Kannan and pushing Indira aside. Disappointed, Indira tries to commit suicide, but Kannan saves her. He leaves Ishwarya with Indira. Learning of the true love between them, Indira goes to Germany with Ishwarya, ahead of Kannan's family and waits for them. Indra Kumar and Indira unite. Kannan and Ishwarya reunite as well.

== Cast ==
- Vijay as Kannan (Kasi)
- Khushbu as Indra Devi
- Rambha as Priya
- Monica as Ishwarya
- Manivannan as Devanathan
- Karan as Ashok
- R. Sundarrajan as Sub-inspector Shiva Kumar
- Mansoor Ali Khan as Vedhachalam
- Manobala as Vedhachalam's henchman
- Anu Mohan as Police Constable Vijay
- Chandrakanth as Kannan's brother
- Bhavana as Kannan's sister
- Tharun Kumar as Indra Kumar
- Madhan Bob as Vedhachalam's henchman
- Master Mahendran as Vetri
- Muthukaalai as a bystander
- Crane Manohar as a police constable
- Kovai Sarala as a flower seller
- C. R. Saraswathi as a Indra Devi's factory worker
- K. S. Ravikumar as Mahendran (Guest appearance)

== Production ==
The story and dialogue of Minsara Kanna were written by M. A. Kennedy, and the screenplay by director K. S. Ravikumar. The film's title was derived from a song from Ravikumar's previous directorial Padayappa (1999). It remains the only collaboration to date between Ravikumar and Vijay, with the actor mentioning he was delighted with the pace and commitment that the director injected into production. Priya Gill was initially approached, before debutant Monica Castelino got the opportunity to feature. This was one of the last film roles of child actress Bhavana, who later shifted to television. Shooting took place in locations including Ooty, Austria, Germany, and Switzerland; a few scenes were shot in the Alps area.

== Soundtrack ==
The soundtrack was composed by Deva. The song "Un Per Solla" attained popularity.

Track listing
No.	Title	Lyrics	Singer(s)	Length
1.	"Oodha Oodha"	Vaali	Hariharan, Harini	5:56
2.	"Boy Frienda"	Vaali	Mano, Sujatha Mohan	5:16
3.	"Un Per Solla" (solo)	Kalaikumar	Sujatha Mohan	2:11
4.	"Un Per Solla" (duet)	Kalaikumar	Hariharan, Sujatha Mohan	5:09
5.	"Theemukka"	Vaali	S. P. Balasubrahmanyam, K. S. Chithra	5:04
6.	"Oh Uncle"	Na. Muthukumar	Mano	5:26
Total length:				29:02

== Release ==
Minsara Kanna was released on 9 September 1999. According to Ravikumar, the film underperformed at the box office, potentially due to the successful run of Padayappa. Despite this, audiographer G. Ravi won the Tamil Nadu State Film Award for Best Audiographer.

== Critical reception ==
The New Indian Express criticised Vijay's performance, saying comedy was not "his cup of tea" and that the "film drags on aimlessly" but praised Deva's soundtrack. Sify criticised the film's lack of originality, noting its similarities to Jodi and Poovellam Kettuppar, and added, "The only good thing about Minsara Kanna is that it offers some new twists and turns that will definitely retain viewer interest". Deccan Herald also gave the film a negative review saying that Vijay "is painful to watch and even worse to listen to", and labelled the film "an exercise in how to waste a good movie". Ananda Vikatan rated the film 37 out of 100.

Aurangazeb of Kalki panned the lengthy dialogues, poor flashback and performance of Vijay but praised the acting of the other actors, calling them as relief as they overshadow Vijay's acting. D. S. Ramanujam of The Hindu wrote, "Humour and veiled innuendos are second nature to director K. S. Ravikumar, who schemes bountiful fun-filled situations with his screenplay based on M. A. Kennedy's weather-beaten story of taming a rich woman, who hates men". He also lauded Ashok Rajan's cinematography. K. N. Vijiyan of New Straits Times wrote, "Humour and the way Ravikumar narrates his story save this movie from being just another ordinary love story. Go for it for a fun time".

== Post-release ==
Post-release, Minsara Kanna garnered attention after video recording equipment was found at Suriyan Theatre in Chennai which had been showing the film. The equipment was found out to be a unit of a group known as Saravanas Video, who had been hired by a TV production company owned by K. Balachander. Vijay's father S. A. Chandrasekhar intervened, seized the equipment and alleged that Balachander was potentially involved in piracy activities. Balachander subsequently stepped down as president from the Film Employees Federation of South India (FEFSI), complaining that he was being harassed by Chandrasekhar. As a result, members of the film industry threatened to ban Vijay and Chandrasekhar from working on Tamil films. During the unofficial ban, actor Ajith Kumar notably spoke out in favour of Vijay. The parties later reconciled and Balachander withdrew his resignation.

In February 2020, after the South Korean film Parasite (2019) won the Academy Award for Best Picture, netizens felt its story resembled that of Minsara Kanna. Subsequently, producer P. L. Thenappan, who bought the rights of Minsara Kanna from K. R. Gangadharan, announced his plans to sue the makers of Parasite for plagiarism. However, CJ Entertainment, the producers of Parasite, denied receiving any plagiarism charge. The Quint noted that the "premise of the boy's family working undercover in the girl's house" was already a popular trope in the 1980s, while Aananth Daksnamurthy of ThePrint noted that infiltration by proxy is the only mutual theme in both films.
