= Anup Upadhyay =

Indian actor

- Born: Ganj Dundawara, Uttar Pradesh, India)
- Occupation: Actor
- Years active: 1999–present

Anup Upadhyay is an Indian stage, film and television actor. He is known for portraying David Mishra "Chachaji" in the Hindi comedy series Bhabi Ji Ghar Par Hai!. He has also acted in F.I.R., Lapataganj and in Life Ok serial May I Come In Madam? as Chedilal Hiteshi.

== Early life ==
Upadhyay was born in Ganj Dundawara in Uttar Pradesh, where he completed his graduation.

== Theatre ==
After graduation, he shifted to Delhi where he started acting in plays alongside Habib Tanvir. Upadhyay has an experience of twenty years in theatre with Dekh Rahe Hain Nayan and Agrabazar being two of his favourite plays.

== Filmography ==
=== Films ===
Year	Film	Role	Language
2003	Main Madhuri Dixit Banna Chahti Hoon	Security Guard	Hindi
2006	Jadu Sa Chal Gaya	Raj's house servant	Hindi
2008	Chamku	Journalist	Hindi
2008	Bhootnath	Teacher	Hindi
2010	Na Ghar Ke Naa Ghaat Ke	Hawaldaar	Hindi
2026	Bhabiji Ghar Par Hain! Fun On The Run	David Mishra	Hindi

=== Television ===
Year	Serial	Role
1999–2009	Yes Boss	Sunny
2006–2011	F.I.R.	Various characters
2009	Bhootwala Serial	Kamuk Kamlesh
2009–2014	Lapataganj	Chhotu Mama
2013	Hum Aapke Hain In Laws	Kewal Kumar Johar Fufaji
2014–2016	Neeli Chatri Waale	Govardhan Dubey
2014	Tum Saath Ho Jab Apne	Jamaal
2016–2026	Bhabi Ji Ghar Par Hai!	David Mishra a.k.a. Chachaji
2016–2017	May I Come In Madam?	Mr. Hitesh/Peon Chedilal
2018–2020	Jijaji Chhat Par Hai	Murarilal Bansal
2020	Excuse Me Maadam	Adhbut "Adu"
2021	Jijaji Chhat Parr Koii Hai	Jaldiram Sharma
2023–2024	May I Come In Madam?	Mr. Chedilal Hiteshi
