= Tu Mere Agal Bagal Hai =

Indian Hindi language Comedy show

- Genre: Comedy
- Written by: Anukalp Goswami
- Directed by: Rajan Waghdhare
- Creative director: Deep Chanda
- Starring: See below
- Country of origin: India
- Original language: Hindi
- No. of seasons: 1
- No. of episodes: 60

Production
- Producers: Ranjit Thakur; Hemant Ruprell
- Editors: Mandar Khanvilkar; Sunil Dahifale
- Running time: 24-26 minutes
- Production company: Frames Producation Company

Original release
- Network: SAB TV
- Release: 7 July 2014 – 2014

Tu Mere Agal Bagal Hai is a live audience comedy show that premiered on Sony SAB on 7 July 2014 and concluded on 26 September 2014.It Stars Alok Nath, Rajesh Kumar, Shweta Gulati and Sugandha Mishra.

== Plot ==
The show depicts the shared living arrangement within a single dwelling, Bungalow No. 5. The narrative focuses on the interactions between two distinct groups of residents: the owners of the property Laal Singh his wife Kesari and their tenants. Laal Singh is a man who has not achieved success till now and hence he has a house filled with the tenants. He has no source of income as he is unemployed and unsuccessful and thus he has to manage himself with the rent he gets from the tenants. His wife Kesari talks too much and she is also a fighter who fights for Justice for women. Laal Singh's father Jagat Bapuji has instilled good values in his son and he loves his children. He loves the tenants and Ganga Mausi, too.

Among the tenants, there is Pillavakandi who is an actress and she has a secret husband who is named Pillu. Pillavakandi kept her husband in her closet as her top secret. She does not disclose it to anyone as she fears she will not get good roles if it is discovered that she is married. Another tenant is named Khakhra who has a business of Food and lives there with his wife named Khandvi. Sometimes her mother Basundi visits them. And the only pair remaining is Anu and Mallik who sing poorly. They also reside with them. The guard of the house is Sher Singh and the maid is named Varsha / Victoria Bai. The show goes on with these people having their daily problems.

== Cast ==
=== Main ===
- Rajesh Kumar as Laal Singh
- Shweta Gulati as Kesari
- Sugandha Mishra as Pillavakandi
- Dhaval as Pillu
- Manoj Goyal as Anu
- Abhishek Awasthi as Mallik
- Alok Nath as Jagat Bapuji
- Supriya Pathak as Ganga Mausi
- Apara Mehta as Basundi
- Ami Trivedi as Khandvi
- Sameer Shah as Khakhra
- Monica Castelino as Victoria Bai / Varsha
- Sukesh Anand as Sher Singh

=== Cameo appearances ===
- Saanand Verma as Psycho
- Jaywant Wadkar
- Ashiesh Roy
- Sushmita Mukhejee
- Saleem Zaidi

== See also ==
- List of Hindi comedy shows
