= Melissa Pais =

Indian actress

- Other name: Mellu Pais
- Occupation: Actress
- Years active: 2004–present

Melissa Pais is an Indian actress who primarily works in Hindi television. She had appeared in the Comedy Circus series as well as some episodes of , F.I.R. She appeared in Bhootwala Serial. She also worked in Sajan Re Jhoot Mat Bolo as Preeti and Golmaal Hai Bhai Sab Golmaal Hai as Dhawal's lover. She also appeared in Pritam Pyare Aur Woh as Bhutrina.

== Television ==
Year	Serial	Role
2004–2005	Main Banungi Miss India	Kamya
2005	Karma – Koi Aa Rahaa Hai Waqt Badalney	Kaira
2006–2009	Stree Teri Kahani	Lalita
2007	C.I.D.	Ansha
2007	Parrivaar	Sajni
2007	Ardhangini	Roktima
2008	Miley Jab Hum Tum	Miss Aha
2008–2009	F.I.R.	Various characters
2009	Comedy Circus	Herself
2009	Bhootwala Serial	Katili
2009–2012	Sajan Re Jhoot Mat Bolo	Preeti Shah
2010	Maha Sangram	Various characters
2010	Comedy Circus Ke SuperStars	Various characters
2011	Adhoora Bandhan	Monika
2012	Golmaal Hai Bhai Sab Golmaal Hai	Suzi
2014–2016	Neeli Chatri Waale	Baby Dubey
2014	Pritam Pyare Aur Woh	Bhuthrina
2015–2017	Chidiya Ghar	Hirni and Various Characters
2016–2017	May I Come In Madam?	TV News Reporter
2017–2018	Aadat Se Majboor	Inspector Rohini Talpade
2018	Har Shaakh Pe Ullu Baithaa Hai	Malai
2018	Khichdi	Mrs. D'Souza
2023	Baazi Ishq Ki	Chanda
2025	Ufff..Yeh Love Hai Mushkil	Sheela
2025	Yeh Rishta Kya Kehlata Hai	Jalebi Bai
