= Ardhangini – Ek Khoobsurat Jeevan Saathi =

Indian television series

- Created by: Jay Production
- Directed by: Shyam Maheshwari
- Starring: See below
- Voices of: Javed Ali; Pamela Jain; Debojit Saha; Raktima Chatterjee
- Opening theme: "Ardhangani" by Javed Ali and Pamela Jain
- Country of origin: India
- Original languages: Hindi; Bengali
- No. of seasons: 1
- No. of episodes: 84

Production
- Producers: Jay Mehta &; Kinnari Mehta
- Running time: approx. 24 minutes
- Production company: Jay Production

Original release
- Network: Zee TV
- Release: 29 October 2007 – 20 March 2008

Ardhangini – Ek Khoobsurat Jeevan Saathi is an Indian Hindi-language television series that aired on Zee TV from 29 October 2007 to 20 March 2008 based on the concept of how beauty turns into a curse. It concludes with the death of the lead character, Kangana, in the series' last episode.

== Plot ==
The story is based on the life of a simple girl named Kangana, who belongs to a traditional Bengali family. Kangana is an exceptionally beautiful girl who knows that she can attract any man, but still hopes for a life partner who will admire, respect and want her for who she is, not her beauty. However, when her beauty becomes her curse, it changes her life forever.

Kangana's own family, who are jealous of her, try to destroy every happiness that enters her life. Kangana's childhood sweetheart, Priyam, comes back from America and their love story begins. Kangana falls in love with Priyam, as he has all the qualities she is looking for in her Prince Charming. Soon, she marries him, starting a new chapter in her life. But, life is not as straightforward for Kangana as she was expecting it to be.

Problems start arising in her life because of her beauty. Priyam cannot stand that his wife is far more talented and in-demand than him, and with every passing day, his insecurities about Kangana keep growing. He accuses Kangana of having an affair with his own best friend Nivaan and out of his lowliness complex, starts keeping an eye on her to know what she does and whom she meets. His suspicion grows so much that he starts raising his hand on Kangana. He gives her a permanent scar on her face so that she would look like a normal person.

In the end, Kangana commits suicide because she was raped and did not want to bring shame on the family.

== Cast ==
- Sudeepa Singh as Kangana Priyam Bhattacharya (née Dasgupta): Priyam's late wife (2007–2008) (Dead)
- Ajay Krishnamurti as Priyam Bhattacharya: Kangana's widower (2007–2008)
- Chetan Pandit as Chandra Sen
- Indira Krishnan as Sushmita Sen
- Melissa Pais as Roktima Sen / Bhattacharya
- Roma Sengupta as Thakur Maa
- Sonali Verma as Paromita Bhattacharya
- Gireesh Sahdev as Harish Bhattacharya
- Jay Pathak as Palash Bhattacharya
- Hemant Choudhary as Onir Bhattacharya
- Shalini Kapoor as Moonmoon Masi
- Himanshi Choudhary / Monaz Mevawala as Bipasha Mitra
- Gaurav Khanna as Nivaan Banerjee
- Mukul Dev as Business Man
- Sudha Chandran as Maushumi Bhattacharya
- Ritu Vij as Sonalika Bhattacharya
