= Tapsi =

Tapsi may refer to:

- TAPSI, Iranian ridesharing company
- Täpsi, village in Estonia
- Tapsi, a female practitioner of Tapas (tapasya) in Indian religions
- Tapsee Pannu (born 1987), an Indian film actress

== See also ==
- Tapasya (disambiguation)
