= Malappuram Haji Mahanaya Joji =

- Poster
- Directed by: Thulasidas
- Screenplay by: Thulasidas; Dialogue : Rajan Kiriyath; Vinu Kiriyath
- Story by: Babu G. Nair
- Produced by: A.K. Babu; Najeeb
- Starring: Madhu; Mukesh; Siddique; Narendra Prasad; Premkumar
- Cinematography: Vijayakumar; Thangar Bachan
- Edited by: G. Murali
- Music by: Johnson
- Production company: Shine Productions
- Distributed by: Gayathri release
- Release date: 1994
- Running time: 130 minutes
- Country: India
- Language: Malayalam

Malappuram Haji Mahanaya Joji (transl. Malappuram Haji and The Great Joji) is a 1994 Indian Malayalam-language comedy film screen play and directed by Thulasidas and dialogues by Rajan Kiriyath and Vinu Kiriyath from a story by Babu G. Nair. The film stars Madhu, Mukesh, Siddique, Narendra Prasad, and Premkumar. The music for the film was composed by Johnson. The film was remade in Tamil as Raman Abdullah (1997) and in Telugu as Golmaal (2003). The scene where Jagathy Sreekumar's character was shot was shown in Poove Unakkaga (1996) with R. S. Shivaji's character getting stabbed.

== Plot ==
Kunjalikutty, who is a Muslim gets both a visa to Dubai and a job offer at a school managed by his father's friend, Malappuram Hajiyar in Malappuram at the same time. His father refuses to let him go to Dubai and wants him to take the teaching job. So Kunjalikutty sends his friend Joji a handsome and well-educated Hindu, in his place to the school, and goes to Dubai without his parents knowledge.

Malappuram Hajiyar is a bold and religious man having a huge public appeal, with no tolerance towards deception. Thus people approach him with awe. Hajiyar's code of conduct scares Joji to the core that he has to conceal his own identity while living as Kunjalikkutty's impostor. A hilariously hostile relationship develops between Joji and Aliyar, who is the physical education teacher, and later, Joji's roommate. Joji soon gets into the good books of Hajiyar, while Aliyar remains stuck in the rut of being too slack for a teacher, for instance, coming late for the school.Aliyar and Joji have a rocky start as roommates and colleagues .

Things do not go easy for Joji. He nearly blows his cover at times, which triggers Aliyar's suspicion. On one such occasion, he is accidentally confronted by Gouri, who hails from a reputed Hindu family, when he goes to the temple and is caught by her and the priest. The story enters a serious turn, when Kunjalikutty shows up, telling Joji that he has become a victim of a visa scam run by Jafer Khan, who now targets Kunjalikutty to finish him off. Also trouble comes in the form of Premalatha Usha who was one of Joji's old students married to the canteen owner who lives right next to Joji. Premalatha is married to Pattalam Sukumaran Premkumar who is a hot tempered and a highly paranoid soldier on leave .He is further incensed when Aliyar talks ill about Joji's character to Sukumaran. Premalatha one day spots Joji and is happy to see her old tutor . Joji pulls her aside and makes her understand that he is living under the false identity of Kunjalikutty. Their conversation is heard by Aliyar who is hiding behind and cant wait to tip Hajjiar in a bid to get Joji thrown out disgracefully.Sukumaran on the other hands sees His wife and Joji having hushed conversation and assumes they are having an affair . Sukumaran in a fit of anger gets his gun and tries to shoot Joji who is trying to reason with Aliyar . The bullet mistakenly hits Aliyars neck and renders him mute till his surgery .

How Joji, Kunjalikutty get to the bottom of things while avoiding Jaffar Khans gundas and also prevent Aliyar form spilling the beans about Joji's identity form the rest of the story.

== Cast ==
- Mukesh as Joji / Jonakkapparambil Jithendra Varma
- Siddique as Kunjalikkutty, Joji's Friend
- Madhu as Malappuram Haji
- Jagathy Sreekumar as Physical Education Instructor Aliyar
- Narendra Prasad as Kurup
- Maathu as Gouri, Kurup's Sister and Joji's Love Interest
- Meera as Mumtaz, Hajiyar's Daughter and Kunjalikkutty's Love Interest
- Prem Kumar as Havildar Sukumaran
- Usha as Premalatha, Sukumaran's Wife
- Karamana Janardanan Nair as Koya Sahib, Kunjalikkutty's Father
- Indrans as Sankaran, Kurup's Helper and Assistant
- Rizabawa as Jaffar Khan
- Jose Pellissery as School Headmaster Mukundan Menon
- Santha Devi as Kunjalikutty's Mother
- Kozhikode Narayanan Nair as Beerankutty
- Santhakumari as Joji's Mother
- Meghanathan as Veeran, Gouri's Brother
- Kalabhavan Haneef as Peon Khader

== Soundtrack ==
Music: Johnson; Lyrics: Bichu Thirumala

1. "Maanam Mutte" M. G. Sreekumar, Sujatha, C. O. Anto
2. "Penkiliye" G. Venugopal, K. S. Chithra
