= Suryagarh =

Suryagarh is a village in Mangraura block, Pratapgarh district, Uttar Pradesh, India with a population of 3147. Gram pradhan of this village has been initiated many projects for the development of primary school with the help of many persona of the same village who is a good place and willing to contribute for the welfare project of Suryagarh at present Prabhawati Tiwari is Gram Pradhan of the village.
