= Captain House =

Indian television series

- Created by: Balaji Telefilms
- Developed by: Ekta Kapoor
- Written by: Imtiyaz Patel
- Directed by: Taariq Shah
- Starring: Kanwaljeet Singh
- Country of origin: India
- Original language: Hindi
- No. of seasons: 1
- No. of episodes: 35

Production
- Producers: Ekta Kapoor; Shobha Kapoor
- Production locations: Mumbai, Maharashtra, India
- Camera setup: Single-camera
- Running time: 24 minutes
- Production company: Balaji Telefilms

Original release
- Network: DD Metro
- Release: 2 January 1995 – 19 November 1996

Captain House is an Indian comedy drama series created and co-produced by Ekta Kapoor and Shobha Kapoor under their banner Balaji Telefilms. The series premiered in 1995 on DD Metro.

== Plot ==
The series is a horror comedy that revolves around a haunted house with an element of fantasy to it. The story revolves around a young widow and her two little children who come to live in the house.

== Cast ==
- Kanwaljeet Singh/Narendra Jha
- Vaidehi Amrute
- Seema Deshmukh
- Tanvi Hegde
- Lekha Govil
- Shehzad Khan
