= Tapasya Nayak Srivastava =

Indian television actress

Tapasya Nayak
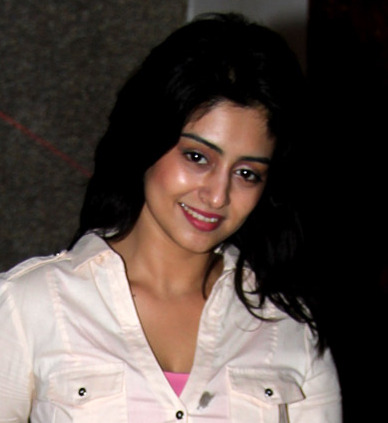
- Tapasya Nayak in 2014
- Born: 13 February 1986 (age 40); Nagaon, Assam, India
- Citizenship: Indian
- Occupation: Actress
- Height: 5 ft 6 in (168 cm)
- Website: https://www.instagram.com/tapasya.s.nayak/

Tapasya Nayak is an Indian television actress. She is known for appearing in the television serial Chakravartin Ashoka Samrat as Ahankara's mother Queen Nihaarika. She has worked in many other serials of Sony SAB such as Taarak Mehta Ka Ooltah Chashmah, Chidiya Ghar and Pritam Pyare Aur Woh.

== Television ==
Tapasya Nayak began her television career in 2013 with cameo roles in the Sony SAB series Taarak Mehta Ka Ooltah Chashmah, portraying characters Bharti and Preethi (Vicky's girlfriend).

| Title | Role | Channel | Notes |
|---|---|---|---|
| Taarak Mehta Ka Ooltah Chashmah | Bharti | Sony SAB | Cameo |
| Taarak Mehta Ka Ooltah Chashmah | Preethi (Vicky's girlfriend) | Sony SAB | Cameo |
| Pritam Pyare Aur Woh | Mary D'Souza | Sony SAB | Lead role |
| Chidiya Ghar | Kitti | Sony SAB | |
| Chakravartin Ashoka Samrat | Queen Niharika (Ahankara's mother) | Colors TV | |
| Savdhaan India | Kusum | Life OK | S55 E19 |
| Dr. Bhanumati On Duty | Jr. Dr. Sonia | Sony SAB | Side role |
| Adaalat | Suzanne Sequiera | Sony TV | Episodic role |
| Bhanwar | Uma & Kareena | Sony TV | Episode 11 & 32 |
