= Swami Tapasyananda =

Personal life
- Born: 1904
- Died: 3 October 1991 (aged 86–87)
- Notable work(s): Bhagavata Purana from Sanskrit to English in 4 Volumes, Translations of Bhagavad Gita, Adhyatma Ramayana, Sundara Kandam, Narayaneeyam, Bhakti Ratnavali, Sri Vishnu Sahasranama, Sri Lalita Sahasranama, Saundarya Lahari, Shivananda Lahari, and Kapilopadesha, Short biographies of Sri Ramakrishna, Sri Sarada Devi and Swami Vivekananda, Bhakti Schools of Vedanta.

Religious life
- Religion: Hinduism
- Philosophy: Vedanta

Religious career
- Teacher: Swami Shivananda

Swami Tapasyananda (1904-1991) was a senior monk of the Ramakrishna Mission. He was born in the Palat family of Ottapalam in Kerala, in 1904. His pre-monastic name was K. P. Balakrishnan Menon. In 1921, when he was just 17 years old, he met Swami Brahmananda- a direct disciple and spiritual son of Sri Ramakrishna, in Chennai. He received Mantra-Diksha from Swami Shivananda in 1924, and joined the Order in 1926, at 22 years age after completing in post graduation. In 1932, he received Sannyasa from Swami Shivananda. He was a disciple of Swami Shivananda, one of the eminent disciples of Sri Ramakrishna. The Swami was a vice-president of the Ramakrishna Order from 1985-1991, giving Mantra-Diksha to a large number of devotees. He was an erudite scholar in Indian and Western philosophy. He has to his credit many books in English, including the translations of many scriptures. His translation of Bhagavata Purana in four volumes has been highly acclaimed in intellectual and devotional circles. He was the president of Ramakrishna Math, Chennai from 1971-1991. Swamiji was well known for his austere life and intuitive intellect. His deity was Lord Khrishna and he practiced spiritual activity as told by his Guruji. He was a prolific writer. Some of the books authored by him are listed below. He translated many Hindu classics into English from original Sanskrit. He founded Ramakrishna Mission Hospital at Thiruvananthapuram.

== Bibliography ==
=== Biographies ===
- Sri Ramakrishna: Life and Teachings
- Sri Sarada Devi: Life and Teachings
- Swami Vivekananda: His Life and Legacy
- Sri Sarada Devi, The Holy Mother
- Swami Ramakrishnananda : the apostle of Sri Ramakrishna to the South

=== Studies ===
- Bhakti Schools of Vedanta ISBN 81-7120-226-8
- The four yogas of Swami Vivekananda ISBN 0-7025-0180-8
- The Nationalistic and Religious Lectures of Swami Vivekananda
- The philosophical and religious lectures of Swami Vivekananda
- For Enquirers about Ramakrishna Math and Mission
- Spiritual Quest
- Sri Ramakrishna's Thought on Man, World and God

=== Translations ===
- Srimad Bhagavata; The Holy Book of God - 4 volumes (Original Sanskrit with English Translation) ISBN 81-7823-046-1
- Srimad Bhagavad Gita (Economy Edition)
- Bhagavad Gita (Pocket Edition)
- Adhyatma Ramayana: The Spiritual Version of the Rama Saga (Original Sanskrit with English Translation) ISBN 81-7120-004-4
- Sundarakandam of Srimad Valmiki Ramayana ISBN 81-7120-333-7
- Narayaneeyam : Bhagavata condensed ISBN 81-7120-419-8
- Bhakti ratnavali, or, A necklace of devotional gems : an anthology from Bhagavata ISBN 81-7120-224-1
- Sri Vishnu Sahasranama as per Shankara's commentary
- Sri Lalita Sahasranama: The Text, Transliteration and English Translation ISBN 81-7823-099-2
- Saundarya-lahari of Sri Sankaracarya : with text and translation, and notes based on Laksmidhara's commentary ISBN 81-7120-244-6
- Sivananda Lahari of Shankara
- Aratrika Hymns and Ramnam
- Stotranjali
- Sankara Digvijaya
- Kaplilopadesha
- Prashnottara-ratna-malika of Shankara
- Laghu-Vasudeva-Mananam

== Notes ==
- "Debate between Sankara and Mandana Misra", "By Swami Tapasyananda"
- "Bhagavad Gita Summary (Swami Tapasyananda)"
- "Swami Tapasyananda : Austerity Personified
