= Life OK =

Indian television channel

- Country: India
- Broadcast area: India
- Network: STAR India
- Headquarters: Mumbai, Maharashtra, India

Programming
- Language: Hindi
- Picture format: 1080i HDTV (downscaled to letterboxed 576i for the SDTV feed)

Ownership
- Owner: 21st Century Fox

History
- Launched: 18 December 2011; 14 years ago
- Replaced: STAR One
- Closed: 28 August 2017; 9 years ago
- Replaced by: STAR Bharat

Life OK was an Indian pay television channel owned by Star India. The channel was launched on 18 December 2011 at 1:00 AM, replacing Star One.

It also started airing in the United States on 1 March 2012, and in the United Kingdom and Ireland on 28 May of that same year. It launched its own high-definition feed in October 2012.

On 9 September 2012, the channel's mythological drama Devon Ke Dev...Mahadev recorded a Television Viewership Rating (TVR) of 8.2, marking its highest Television Rating Point (TRP) of 167.[4].

The channel was rebranded as Star Bharat on 28 August 2017.

== Programming ==
=== Comedy series ===
- Alaxmi Ka Super Parivaar
- Bahu Hamari Rajni Kant
- Comedy Classes
- Har Mard Ka Dard
- May I Come In Madam? (season 1)
- Zindagi Kahe Smile Please

=== Drama series ===
- 2612
- Aasman Se Aage
- The Adventures of Hatim
- Ajeeb Daastaan Hai Ye
- Amrit Manthan
- Baawre
- Dafa 420
- Dil Se Di Dua... Saubhagyavati Bhava?
- Do Dil Ek Jaan
- Dream Girl - Ek Ladki Deewani Si
- Ek Boond Ishq
- Ek Nayi Ummeed - Roshni
- Ek Tha Chander Ek Thi Sudha
- Ghulaam
- Gustakh Dil
- Jaane Kya Hoga Rama Re
- Junoon - Aisi Nafrat Toh Kaisa Ishq
- Kaisa Yeh Ishq Hai... Ajab Sa Risk Hai
- Kalash - Ek Vishwaas
- Laut Aao Trisha
- Main Lakshmi Tere Aangan Ki
- Mere Rang Mein Rangne Waali
- Meri Maa
- Naagarjuna - Ek Yoddha
- Nadaan Parindey
- Piya Rangrezz
- Prem Ya Paheli - Chandrakanta
- Pukaar - Call For The Hero
- Rakshak
- Rishton Ka Saudagar - Baazigar
- Sapno Ke Bhawar Mein
- Savdhaan India – India Fights Back
- Savitri
- Sher-e-Punjab: Maharaja Ranjit Singh
- Tum Dena Saath Mera
- Tumhari Paakhi

=== Horror/supernatural series ===
- Ek Thhi Naayka
- Khauff Begins... Ringa Ringa Roses
- Maha Kumbh: Ek Rahasaya, Ek Kahani
- SuperCops Vs Super Villains
- Zindagi Abhi Baaki Hai Mere Ghost

=== Mythological series ===
- Bhakton Ki Bhakti Mein Shakti
- Devon Ke Dev...Mahadev
- Ramleela – Ajay Devgn Ke Saath

=== Reality/non-scripted programming ===
- The Bachelorette India
- Dare 2 Dance
- Hindustan Ke Hunarbaaz
- Laugh India Laugh
- Mazaak Mazaak Mein
- Sacch Ka Saamna
- Welcome – Baazi Mehmaan Nawazi Ki
