= Star Bharat =

Indian Hindi-language television channel

- Logo used since 2022
- Type: Television Channel
- Country: India
- Broadcast area: Worldwide
- Headquarters: Mumbai, Maharashtra, India

Programming
- Language: Hindi
- Picture format: 1080p HDTV

Ownership
- Owner: JioStar
- Sister channels: StarPlus

History
- Launched: 28 August 2017; 9 years ago
- Replaced: Life OK
- Replaced by: Star Bharat (Europe)
- Former names: Star One (2004–2011); Life OK (2011–2017)

Links
- Website: Star Bharat on JioHotstar

Availability

Streaming media
- JioHotstar: India

Star Bharat is an Indian Hindi-language general entertainment pay television channel owned by JioStar, a joint venture between Viacom18 and Disney India. It was launched on 28 August 2017, rebranded from Life OK. The channel broadcasts a mix of original programming, including mythological dramas, crime thrillers, family dramas, and comedy shows, targeting a broad Hindi-speaking audience in India. Notable shows that have aired on the channel include RadhaKrishn, Savdhaan India, Nimki Mukhiya, Kya Haal, Mr. Paanchal? and Jiji Maa.

Star One was rebranded as Life OK in India on 18 December 2011. It was then rebranded again on 28 August 2017 as Star Bharat.

Star Bharat rebranded with a new logo and graphics package on 25 July 2022, during the finale of the scripted reality show Swayamvar – Mika Di Vohti. The new slogan was Dil Deke Dekho Zara (Give Your Heart Away and See).
