= List of Hindi film actors =

Pioneers of Hindi cinema
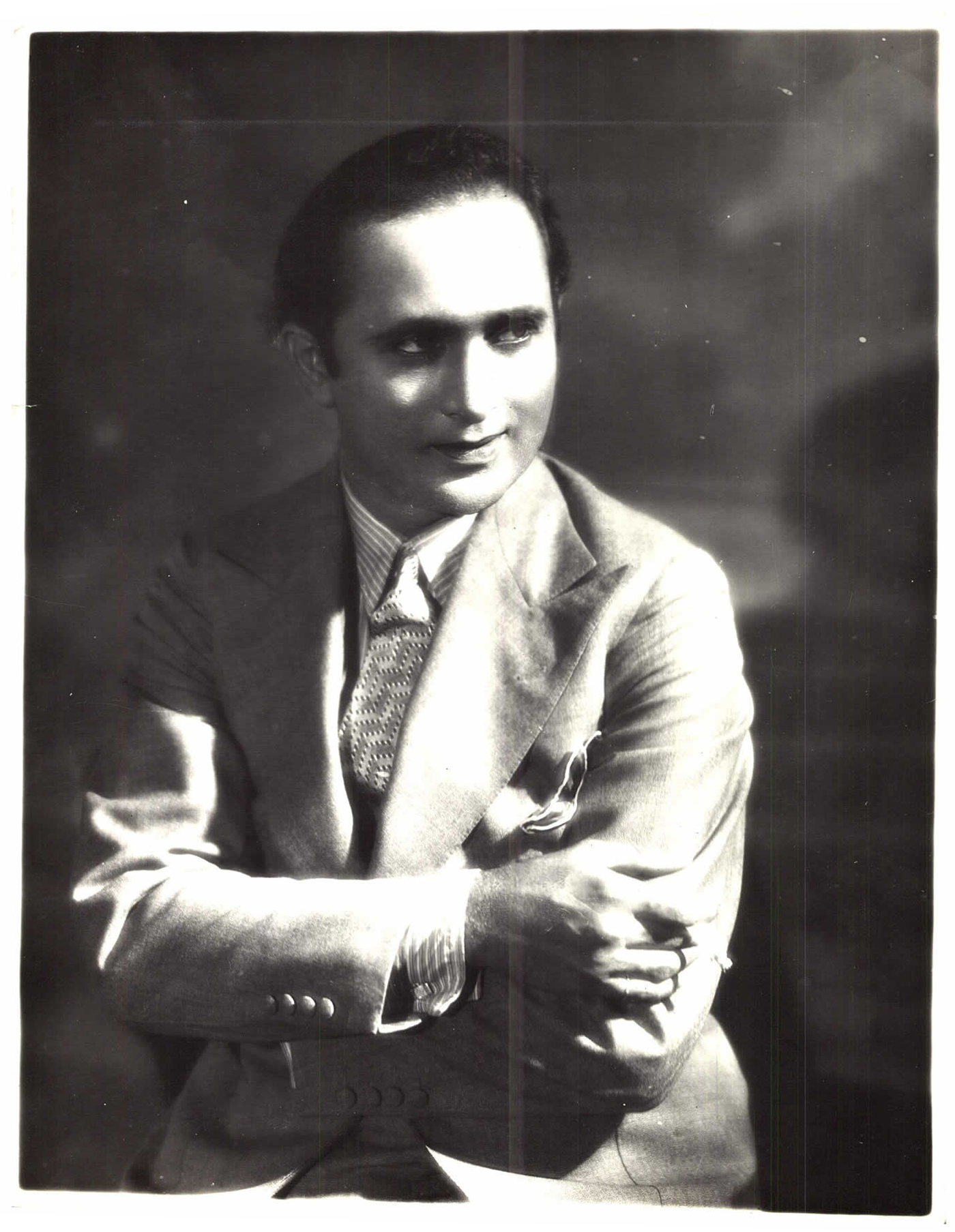
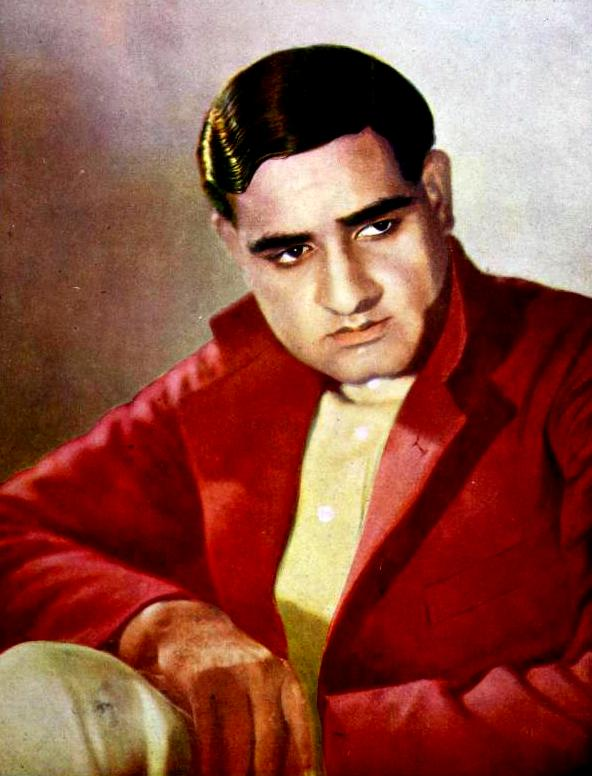
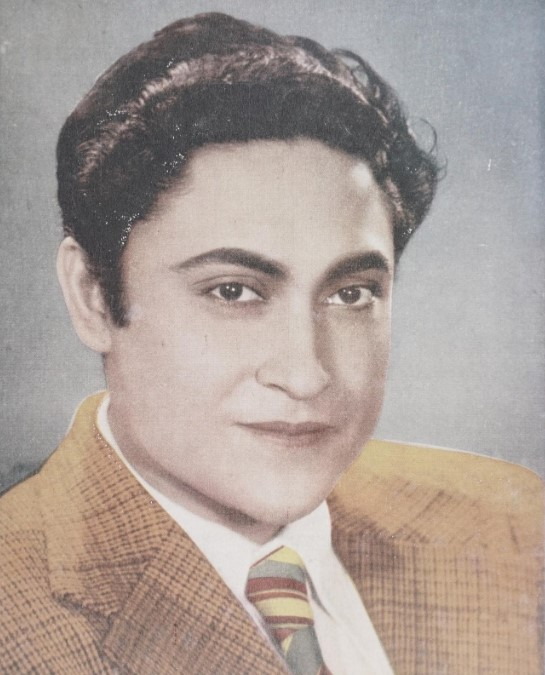
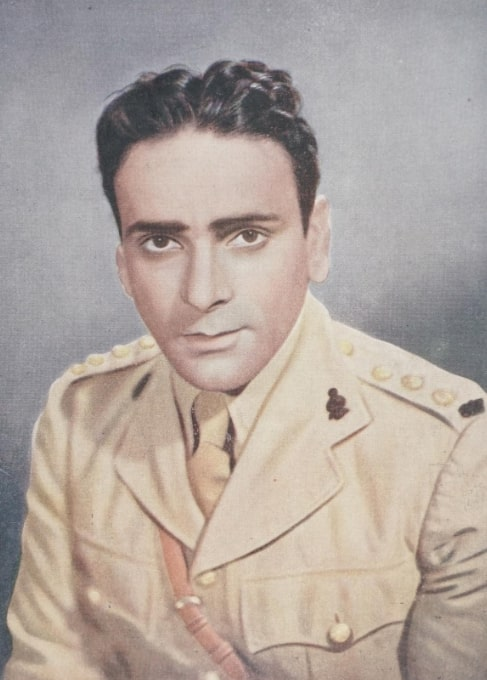
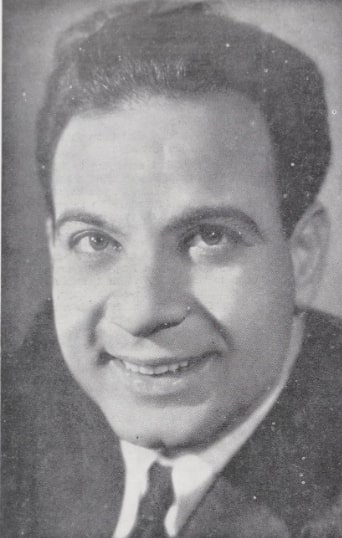
(left to right) Dinshaw Billimoria, K. L. Saigal, Ashok Kumar, Prithviraj Kapoor and Motilal

Golden Age superstars
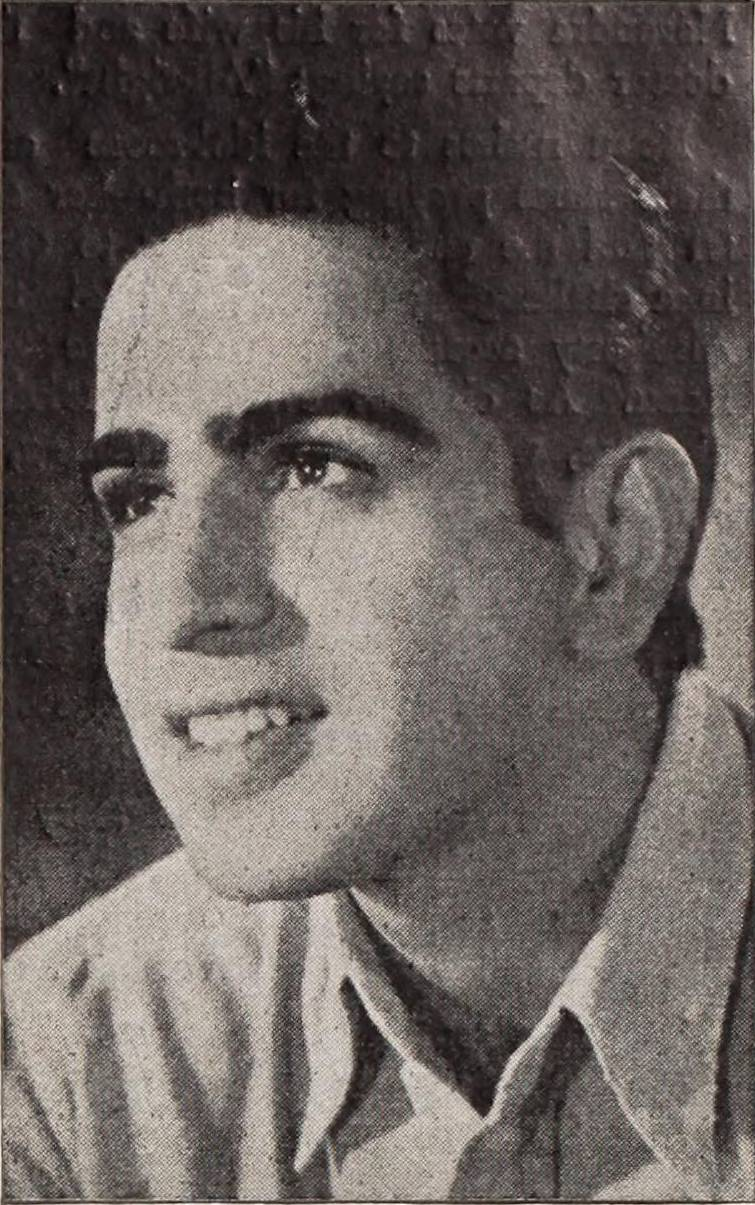
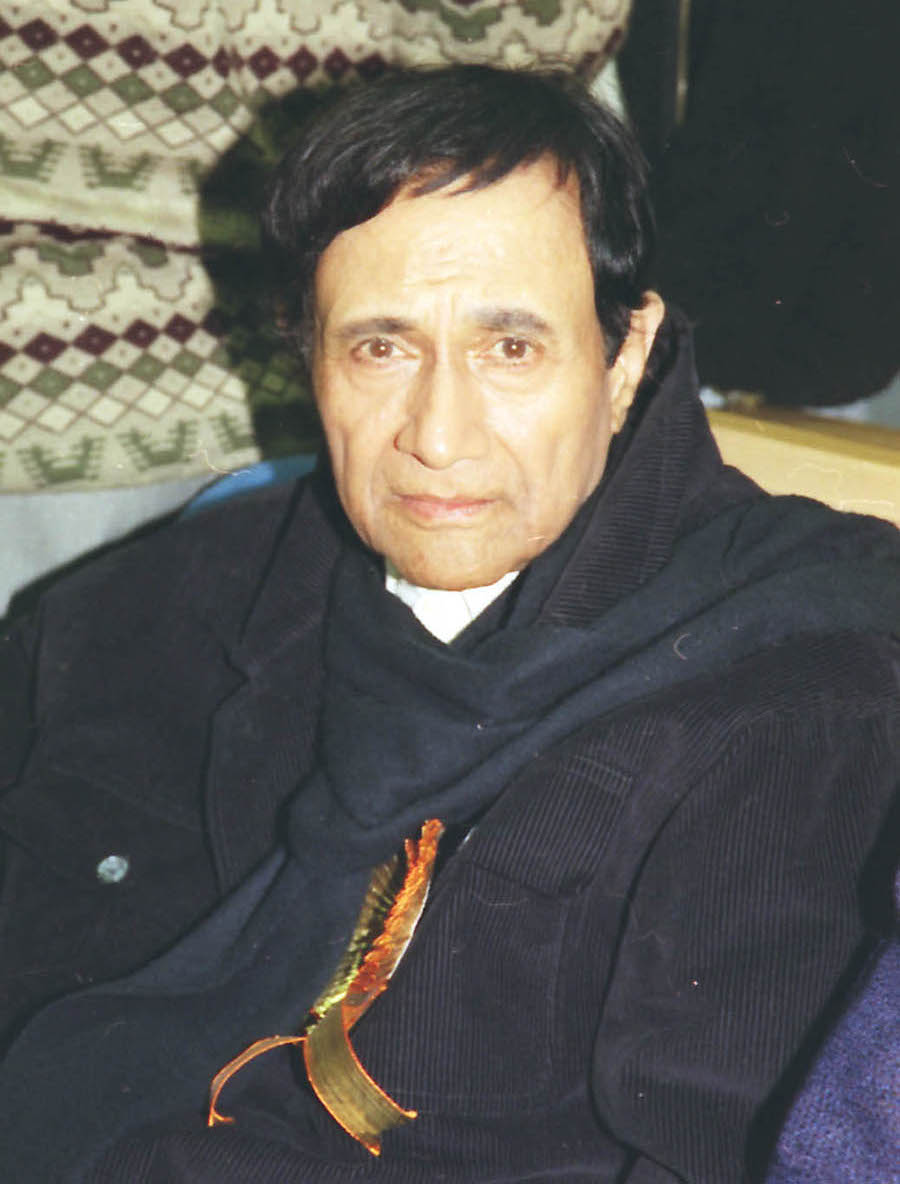
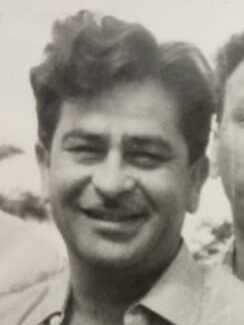
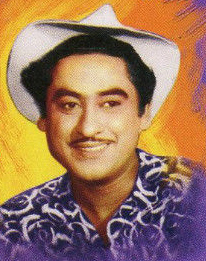
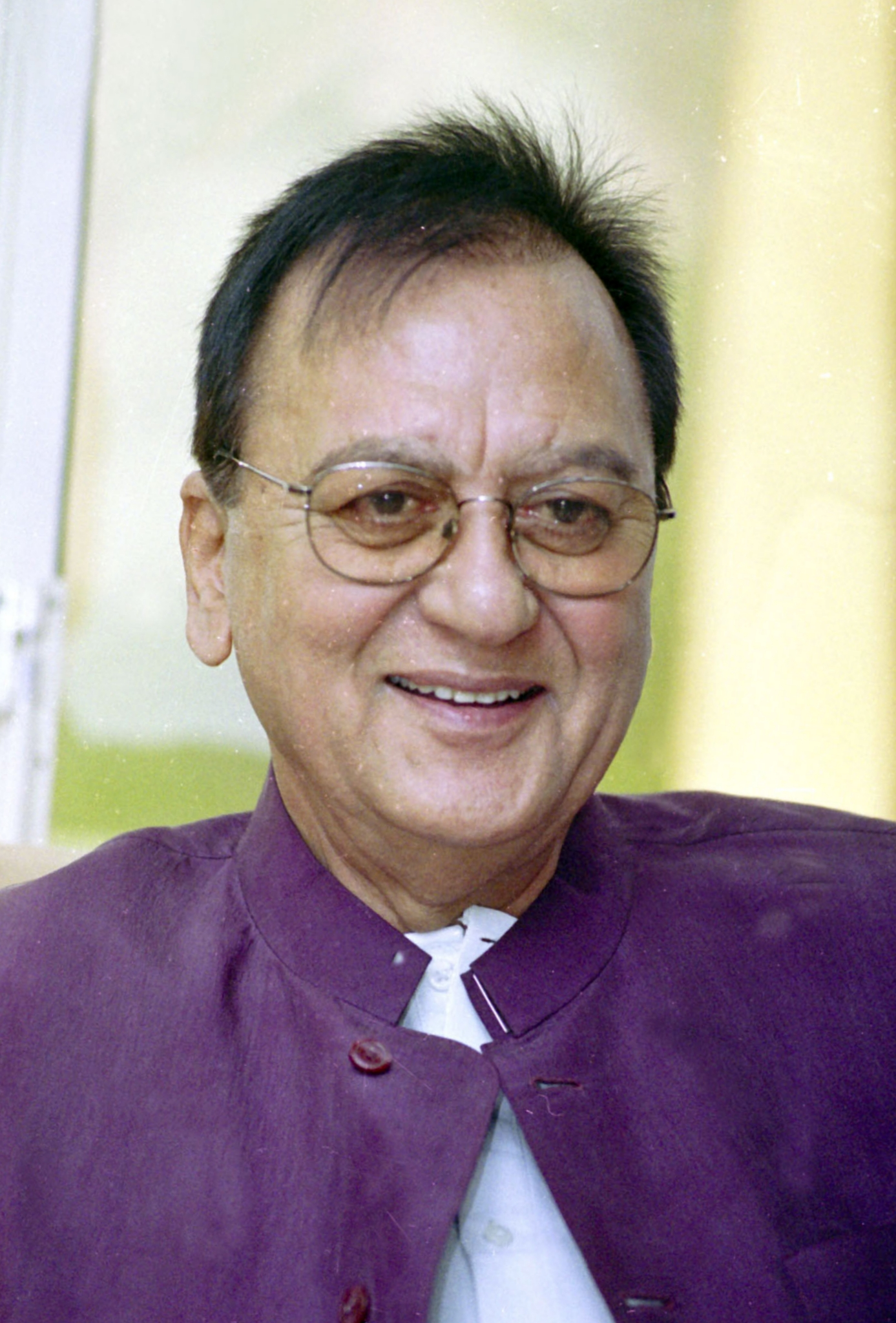
(left to right) Dilip Kumar, Dev Anand, Raj Kapoor, Kishore Kumar and Sunil Dutt

1970s icons
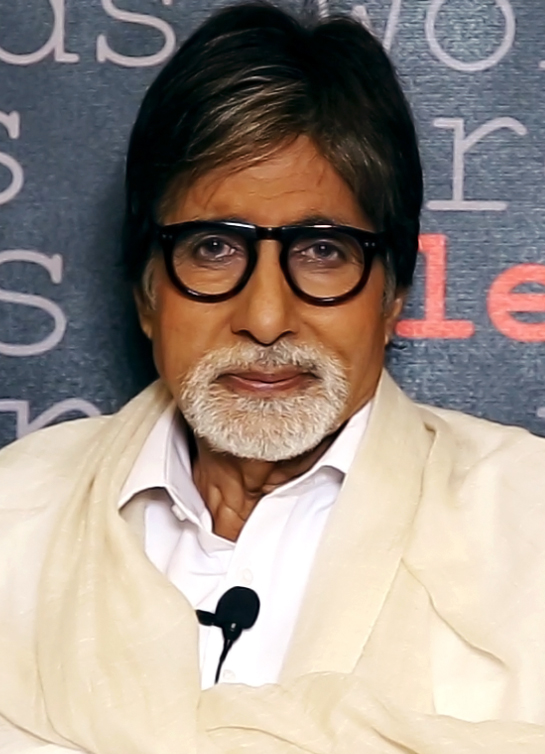
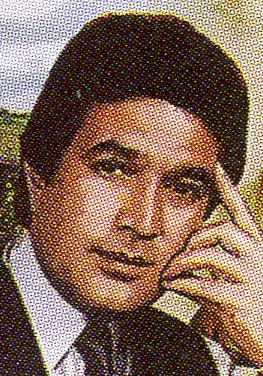
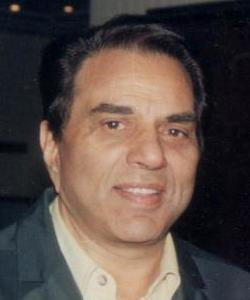
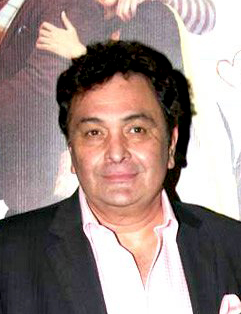
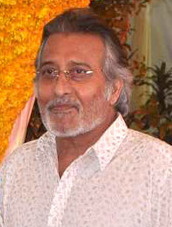
(left to right) Amitabh Bachchan, Rajesh Khanna, Dharmendra, Rishi Kapoor and Vinod Khanna

1980s heroes
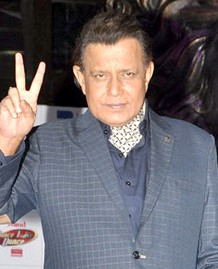
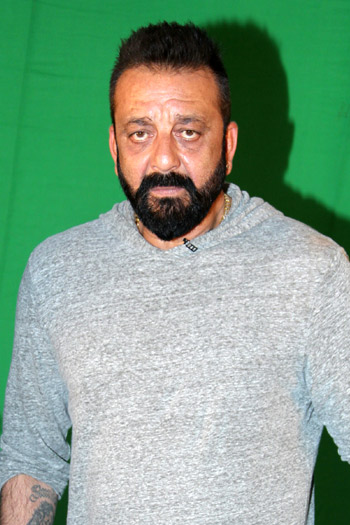
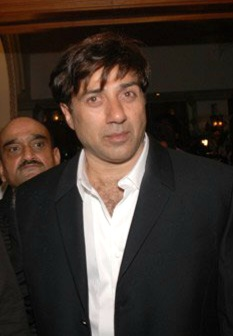
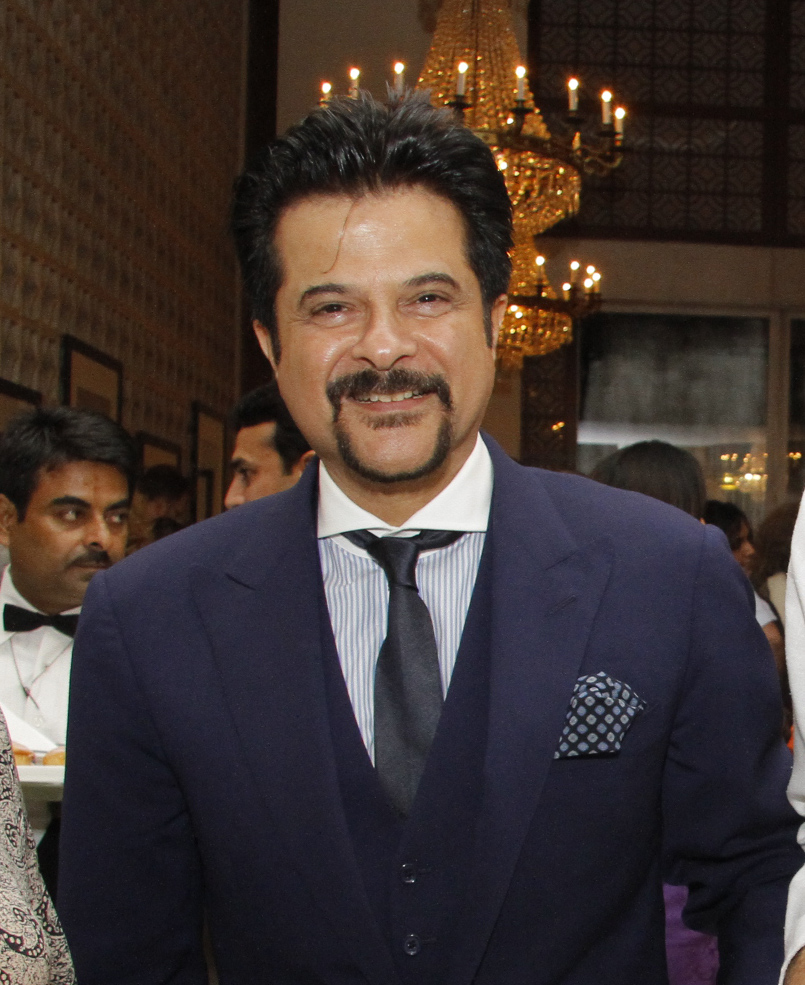
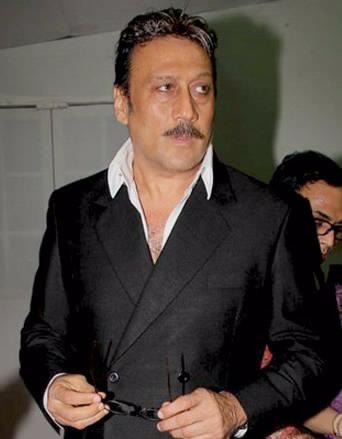
(left to right) Mithun Chakraborty, Sanjay Dutt, Sunny Deol, Anil Kapoor and Jackie Shroff

1990s superstars
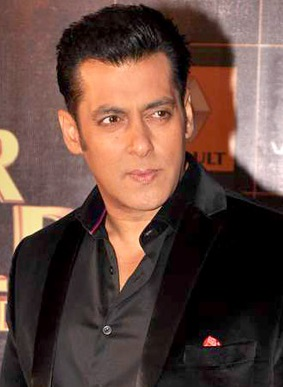
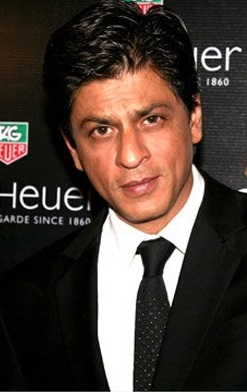
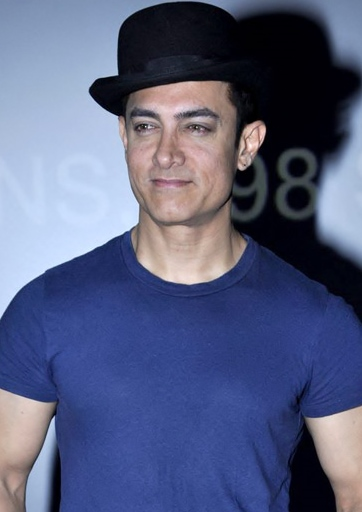
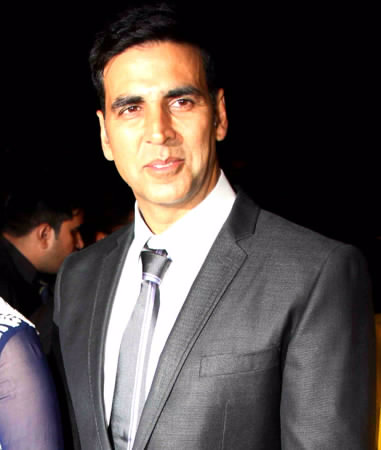
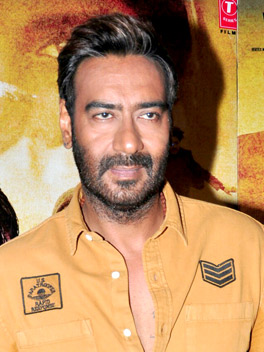
(left to right) Salman Khan, Shah Rukh Khan, Aamir Khan, Akshay Kumar and Ajay Devgan

Early 21st century stars
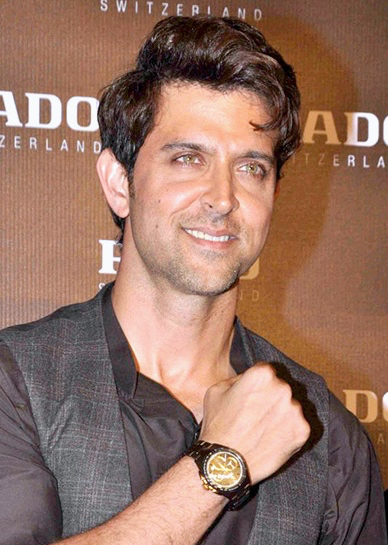
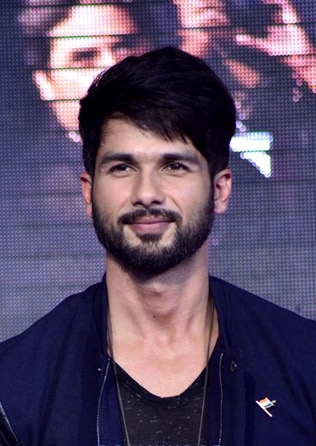
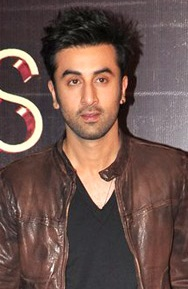
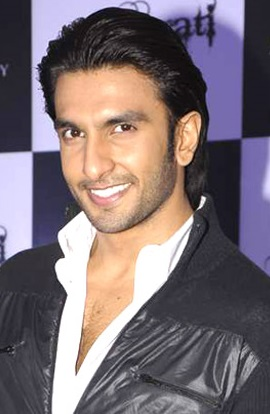
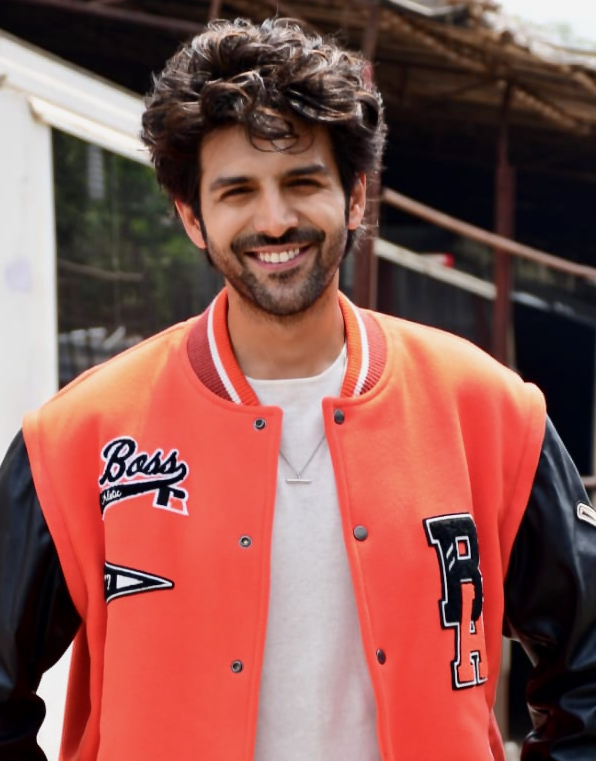
(left to right) Hrithik Roshan, Shahid Kapoor, Ranbir Kapoor, Ranveer Singh and Kartik Aaryan

GenZ Era actors
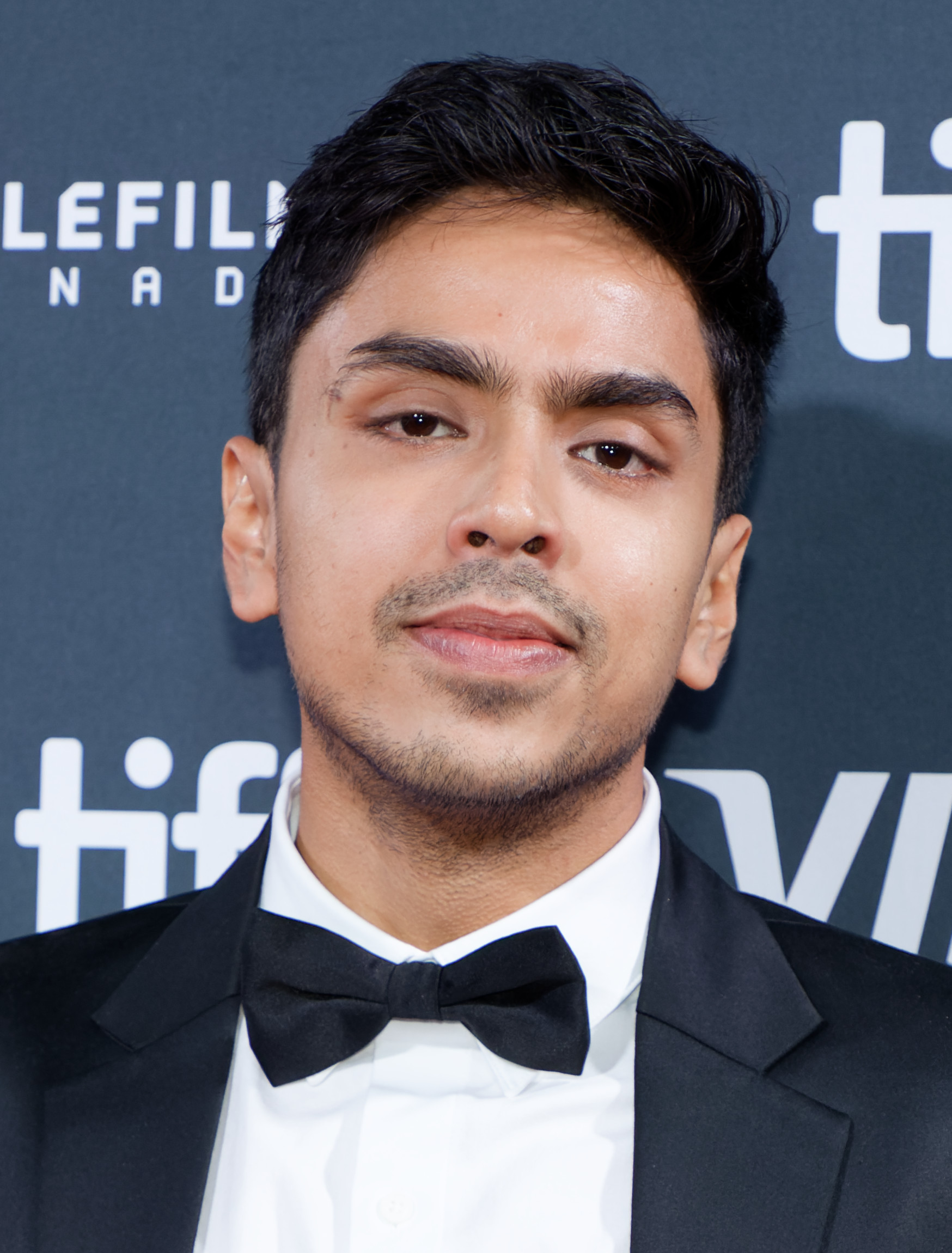
(left to right) Adarsh Gourav, Abhay Verma, Lakshya, Vedang Raina and Ahaan Panday

The following is a list of Indian male actors who have worked in Hindi cinema, the commercial Hindi-language film industry based chiefly in Mumbai.

Actors are listed alphabetically by given name.

== A ==
- A. K. Hangal
- Aamir Bashir
- Aamir Khan
- Aanjjan Srivastav
- Aasif Sheikh
- Abhi Bhattacharya
- Abhijeet Sawant
- Abhimanyu Dassani
- Abhimanyu Singh
- Abhinav Shukla
- Abhishek Bachchan
- Abhay Deol
- Abhay Shukla
- Abhay Verma
- Achyut Potdar
- Adarsh Gourav
- Adi Irani
- Adil Hussain
- Aditya Lakhia
- Aditya Roy Kapur
- Aditya Rawal
- Aditya Seal
- Aditya Shrivastava
- Aftab Shivdasani
- Agha
- Agastya Nanda
- Ahan Shetty
- Ahaan Panday
- Ajay Devgan
- Ajay Nagrath
- Ajit
- Ajith Kumar
- Ajinkya Deo
- Akash Khurana
- Akbar Khan
- Akhilendra Mishra
- Akshay Anand
- Akshay Kumar
- Akshaye Khanna
- Ali Asgar
- Ali Fazal
- Alok Nath
- Aman Verma
- Amar Upadhyay
- Amit Mistry
- Amit Sadh
- Amit Varma
- Amitabh Bachchan
- Amjad Khan
- Amol Palekar
- Amrinder Gill
- Amrish Puri
- Amrit Pal
- Anand Abhyankar
- Anand Tiwari
- Anant Jog
- Anant Mahadevan
- Anant Nag
- Anang Desai
- Angad Bedi
- Anil Kapoor
- Anil Dhawan
- Aniruddh Dave
- Ankit Mohan
- Ankit Gupta
- Ankush Hazra
- Annu Kapoor
- Anoop Kumar
- Anup Soni
- Anup Upadhyay
- Anupam Kher
- Anwar Hussain
- Aparshakti Khurana
- Apurva Agnihotri
- Arbaaz Khan
- Arfi Lamba
- Arif Khan
- Arif Zakaria
- Arjun
- Arjun Kapoor
- Arjun Rampal
- Armaan Kohli
- Arshad Warsi
- Arun Bakshi
- Arun Bali
- Arun Govil
- Arunoday Singh
- Arya Babbar
- Aryan Vaid
- Arvind Trivedi
- Aseem Merchant
- Ashish Vidyarthi
- Ashmit Patel
- Ashok Banthia
- Ashok Kumar
- Ashok Saraf
- Ashutosh Gowariker
- Ashutosh Rana
- Asif Basra
- Asit Sen
- Asrani
- Atul Agnihotri
- Atul Kulkarni
- Avinash Tiwary
- Avinash Wadhawan
- Avtar Gill
- Ayub Khan
- Ayushmann Khurrana

== B ==
- Baba Sehgal
- Babil Khan
- Baburaj
- Bal Dhuri
- Balraj Sahni
- Barun Sobti
- Benjamin Gilani
- Bhagwan Dada
- Bharat Bhushan
- Bharat Kapoor
- Bhushan Tiwari
- Bhupendra Jadawat
- Biswajit Chatterjee
- Bob Christo
- Bobby Deol
- Boloram Das
- Boman Irani
- Brijendrapal Singh
- Brijendra Kala

== C ==
- Chaman Puri
- Chandra Mohan
- Chandrachur Singh
- Chandrashekhar Dubey
- Chandrashekhar Vaidya
- Chetan Hansraj
- Chirag Patil
- Chunky Panday
- Cyrus Sahukar

== D ==
- Dalip Tahil
- Dan Dhanoa
- Danny Denzongpa
- Dara Singh
- Darshan Jariwala
- Darshan Kumar
- Darsheel Safary
- David Abraham Cheulkar
- Daya Shankar Pandey
- Dayanand Shetty
- Deb Mukherjee
- Deep Dhillon
- Deepak Dobriyal
- Deepak Jethi
- Deepak Parashar
- Deepak Shirke
- Deepak Tijori
- Dev Anand
- Deven Bhojani
- Deven Verma
- Devi Mukherjee
- Dhanush
- Dharmendra
- Dharmesh Yelande
- Dheer Charan Srivastav
- Dheeraj Kumar
- Dhritiman Chatterjee
- Dhumal
- Dilip Dhawan
- Dilip Joshi
- Dilip Kumar
- Dilip Prabhavalkar
- Diljit Dosanjh
- Dinesh Hingoo
- Dinesh Kaushik
- Dinesh Phadnis
- Dino Morea
- Dinyar Contractor
- Divyendu Sharma
- Diwakar Pundir
- Dulquer Salmaan
- Danish Pratap Sood

== E ==
- Edward Sonnenblick
- Emraan Hashmi

== F ==
- Fahmaan Khan
- Faisal Khan
- Faraaz Khan
- Fardeen Khan
- Farhan Akhtar
- Farooq Sheikh
- Feroz Khan
- Firoz Irani

== G ==
- Guru Dutt
- Gajanan Jagirdar
- Gajendra Chauhan
- Gajraj Rao
- Ganesh Acharya
- Gautam Mukherjee
- Gavin Packard
- Ghanashyam Nayak
- Gippy Grewal
- Gireesh Sahdev
- Giriraj Kabra
- Girish Karnad
- Girish Kumar
- Goga Kapoor
- Gope
- Gopi Krishna
- Govind Namdev
- Govinda
- Gufi Paintal
- Gulshan Devaiah
- Gulshan Grover
- Gurmeet Choudhary

== H ==
- Hari Shivdasani
- Harindranath Chattopadhyay
- Harish Kumar
- Harish Patel
- Harshad Chopda
- Harman Baweja
- Harsh Chhaya
- Harshvardhan Kapoor
- Harshvardhan Rane
- Hemant Birje
- Hemant Pandey
- Himansh Kohli
- Himanshu Malik
- Himanshu Malhotra
- Himesh Reshammiya
- Hiten Paintal
- Hiten Kumar
- Honey Singh
- Hrithik Roshan
- Hrishikesh Pandey
- Humayun Saeed

== I ==
- Ibrahim Ali Khan
- I. S. Johar
- Iftekhar
- Imran Khan
- Irrfan Khan
- Inaamulhaq
- Inder Kumar
- Indrajith Sukumaran
- Indraneil Sengupta
- Ishaan Khatter
- Ishwak Singh

== J ==
- Jack Gaud
- Jackie Shroff
- Jackky Bhagnani
- Jagdeep
- Jagdish Raj
- Jaideep Ahlawat
- Jamnadas Majethia
- Jankidas
- Jas Arora
- Jassie Gill
- Jatin Sarna
- Javed Jaffrey
- Javed Khan
- Javed Khan Amrohi
- Jayan
- Jayasurya
- Jay Bhanushali
- Jay Mehta
- Jayant Kripalani
- Jeetendra
- Jeevan
- Joginder
- Jibraan Khan
- Jim Sarbh
- Jimmy Shergill
- Jisshu Sengupta
- Jitendra Kumar
- John Abraham
- Johnny Lever
- Johnny Walker
- Joy Mukherjee
- Jugal Hansraj
- Junaid Khan

== K ==
- Kabir Bedi
- Kader Khan
- Kamaal R. Khan
- Kamal Haasan
- Kamal Kapoor
- Kanhaiyalal
- Kanwaljit Singh
- Kapil Sharma
- Karan Dewan
- Karan Grover
- Karan Kapoor
- Karan Kundrra
- Karan Patel
- Karan Singh Grover
- Karan Wahi
- Karanvir Bohra
- Karmveer Choudhary
- Kartik Aaryan
- Kay Kay Menon
- Keshto Mukherjee
- Kharaj Mukherjee
- Kiran Kumar
- Kishore Kumar
- K. K. Goswami
- K. K. Raina
- K. L. Saigal
- K. N. Singh
- Krishan Dhawan
- Krishna Bharadwaj
- Krishan Kumar
- Kuku Kohli
- Kulbhushan Kharbanda
- Kumar Gaurav
- Kumud Mishra
- Kunal Goswami
- Kunal Kapoor
- Kunal Kapoor
- Kunal Khemu
- Kunchako Boban
- Kushal Punjabi

== L ==
- Lakha Lakhwinder Singh
- Lakshya
- Lalit Tiwari
- Laxmikant Berde
- Lilliput
- Lalita Pawar
- Lucky Ali

== M ==
- M. K. Raina
- Mac Mohan
- Madan Jain
- Madan Puri
- Madhukar Toradmal
- Mahavir Shah
- Mahendra Sandhu
- Mahesh Anand
- Mahesh Manjrekar
- Mahipal
- Mamik Singh
- Mammootty
- Manav Gohil
- Manav Kaul
- Manav Vij
- Mangal Dhillon
- Manik Irani
- Maninder Singh
- Manish Chaudhari
- Manish Malhotra
- Manish Paul
- Manjot Singh
- Manmohan
- Manmohan Krishna
- Manohar Singh
- Manoj Bajpayee
- Manoj Joshi
- Manoj Kumar
- Manoj Pahwa
- Manoj Tiger
- Manoj Tiwari
- Moolchand
- Marc Zuber
- Mazhar Khan
- Meezaan Jafri
- Mehmood
- Meiyang Chang
- Milind Gawali
- Milind Gunaji
- Milind Soman
- Mithun Chakraborty
- Mohammed Zeeshan Ayyub
- Mohan Agashe
- Mohan Choti
- Mohan Gokhale
- Mohan Joshi
- Mohan Kapur
- Mohanlal
- Mohan Raman
- Mohit Ahlawat
- Mohit Chadda
- Mohit Raina
- Mohnish Bahl
- Mohsin Khan
- Motilal
- Mudasir Zafar
- Mukesh Batra
- Mukesh Khanna
- Mukesh Rawal
- Mukesh Rishi
- Mukesh Tiwari
- Mukri
- Mukul Chadda
- Mukul Dev
- Mulraj Rajda
- Murad
- Murali Sharma

== N ==
- Naga Chaitanya
- Nagarjuna
- Nakul Kapoor
- Nana Palshikar
- Nana Patekar
- Narendra Nath
- Naresh Kanodia
- Naseeruddin Shah
- Nassar
- Naved Aslam
- Naveen Kaushik
- Naveen Polishetty
- Navin Nischol
- Navin Yagnik
- Nawazuddin Siddiqui
- Nazir Hussain
- Nazir Kashmiri
- Neeraj Vora
- Neil Nitin Mukesh
- Nikesh Ram
- Nikkhil Advani
- Nilu Phule
- Nimai Bali
- Ninad Kamat
- Nirmal Pandey
- Nishikant Dixit
- Nitish Bharadwaj
- Nivin Pauly

== O ==
- Om Katare
- Om Prakash
- Om Puri
- Om Shivpuri
- Omi Vaidya

== P ==
- Paidi Jairaj
- Paintal
- Pankaj Berry
- Pankaj Dheer
- Pankaj Kapoor
- Pankaj Tripathi
- Parambrata Chatterjee
- Paresh Ganatra
- Paresh Rawal
- Parikshat Sahni
- Parmeet Sethi
- Pavan Malhotra
- Pawan Shankar
- Piyush Mishra
- Prabhas
- Prabhu Deva
- Pradeep Kumar
- Pradeep Rawat
- Prakash Raj
- Pran
- Prateik Babbar
- Pratik Gandhi
- Praveen Kumar
- Prem Chopra
- Prem Kishen
- Prem Nazir
- Prem Nath
- Prit Kamani
- Prithviraj Kapoor
- Prithviraj Sukumaran
- Priyanshu Chatterjee
- Priyank Tatariya
- Priyanshu Painyuli
- Pramod Chakravorty
- Prosenjit Chatterjee
- Pulkit Samrat
- Puneet Issar
- Punit Pathak

== R ==
- R. Madhavan
- Raaj Kumar
- Rachit Singh
- Raghav Juyal
- Raghubir Yadav
- Rahil Azam
- Rahul Bose
- Rahul Dev
- Rahul Kumar
- Rahul Roy
- Rahul Singh
- Raj Arjun
- Raj Babbar
- Raj Kapoor
- Raj Kiran
- Raj Kishore
- Raj Mehra
- Raj Zutshi
- Raja Bundela
- Rajan Sippy
- Rajat Bedi
- Rajat Kapoor
- Rajeev Khandelwal
- Rajeev Mehta
- Rajendra Gupta
- Rajendra Kumar
- Rajendra Nath
- Rajendranath Zutshi
- Rajesh Khanna
- Rajesh Khattar
- Rajesh Khera
- Rajesh Puri
- Rajesh Sharma
- Rajesh Vivek
- Rajinikanth
- Rajit Kapur
- Rajkummar Rao
- Rajneesh Duggal
- Rajpal Yadav
- Raju Kher
- Raju Srivastav
- Rakesh Bapat
- Rakesh Bedi
- Rakesh Roshan
- Ramayan Tiwari
- Ram Charan
- Ram Kapoor
- Ramkumar Bohra
- Ramesh Deo
- Ramesh Mehta
- Rami Reddy
- Rana Daggubati
- Ranbir Kapoor
- Randeep Hooda
- Randhir
- Randhir Kapoor
- Ranjan
- Ranjeet
- Ranveer Singh
- Ranvir Shorey
- Rashid Khan
- Rasik Dave
- Ravi Kale
- Ravi Kishan
- Raza Murad
- Razzak Khan
- Rehman
- Rishabh Shukla
- Rishi Kapoor
- Riteish Deshmukh
- Rohan Mehra (born 1990)
- Rohan Mehra (born 1991)
- Rohit Roy
- Rohit Saraf
- Rohitash Gaud
- Romesh Sharma
- Ronit Roy
- Roopesh Kumar

== S ==
- Saanand Verma
- Sabyasachi Chakrabarty
- Sachin Khedekar
- Sachin Pilgaonkar
- Sachin Shroff
- Sadashiv Amrapurkar
- Sadhu Meher
- Saeed Jaffrey
- Sahil Khan
- Saif Ali Khan
- Salim Ghouse
- Salim Khan
- Salman Khan
- Salman Yusuff Khan
- Sameer Dharmadhikari
- Sanjay Dutt
- Sanjay Kapoor
- Sanjay Khan
- Sanjay Mishra
- Sanjay Suri
- Sanjeev Kumar
- Sanjeev Tyagi
- Sapru
- Sarath Babu
- Sarfaraz Khan
- Satish Kaul
- Satish Kaushik
- Satish Shah
- Satyen Kappu
- Saurabh Shukla
- Sayaji Shinde
- Shaan
- Shadaab Khan
- Shabir Ahluwalia
- Shafi Inamdar
- Shah Rukh Khan
- Shahbaz Khan
- Shahid Kapoor
- Shaheer Sheikh
- Shakti Kapoor
- Shammi Kapoor
- Shankar Nag
- Sharad Kapoor
- Sharad Kelkar
- Sharat Saxena
- Sharman Joshi
- Shashank Arora
- Shashi Kapoor
- Shatrughan Sinha
- Shavinder Mahal
- Sheikh Mukhtar
- Shiney Ahuja
- Shishir Sharma
- Shiva Rindani
- Shivaji Satam
- Shreyas Talpade
- Shriram Lagoo
- Shrivallabh Vyas
- Shyam
- Sid Makkar
- Siddhant Chaturvedi
- Siddharth
- Siddharth Ray
- Sidhant Gupta
- Sidharth Malhotra
- Sidharth Shukla
- Sikandar Kher
- Silambarasan
- Snehalata
- Sohail Khan
- Sonu Sood
- Sooraj Pancholi
- Sparsh Shrivastava
- Subrat Dutta
- Sudeepa
- Sudesh Berry
- Sudipto Balav
- Sudhanshu Pandey
- Sudhir
- Sudhir Dalvi
- Sudhir Pandey
- Sujit Kumar
- Sumeet Vyas
- Sumeet Raghavan
- Sunder
- Suniel Shetty
- Sunil Dutt
- Sunil Grover
- Sunil Lahri
- Sunil Pal
- Sunny Deol
- Sunny Kaushal
- Supriyo Dutta
- Surendra
- Surendra Pal
- Suresh
- Suresh Chatwal
- Suresh Gopi
- Suresh Oberoi
- Suriya
- Sushant Singh
- Sushant Singh Rajput
- Swapnil Joshi

== T ==
- Taaruk Raina
- Tahir Raj Bhasin
- Tariq
- Tarun Bose
- Tarun Khanna
- Tej Sapru
- Thakur Anoop Singh
- Tiger Shroff
- Tiku Talsania
- Tinnu Anand
- Tom Alter
- Tota Roy Chowdhury
- Tovino Thomas
- Trilok Kapoor
- Tushar Dalvi
- Tusshar Kapoor

== U ==
- Uday Chopra
- Uday Sabnis
- Ujjwal Chopra
- Upen Patel
- Upendra Limaye
- Upendra Trivedi
- Utpal Dutt
- Uttam Kumar
- Utkarsh Sharma
- Uttam Mohanty

== V ==
- V K Sharma
- Vardhan Puri
- Vaquar Shaikh
- Varun Badola
- Varun Dhawan
- Varun Sharma
- Varun Sood
- Vedang Raina
- Vicky Kaushal
- Victor Banerjee
- Vidyut Jammwal
- Vihaan Samat
- Vijay
- Vijay Anand
- Vijay Arora
- Vijay Devarakonda
- Vijay Raaz
- Vijay Varma
- Vijayendra Ghatge
- Viju Khote
- Vikas Anand
- Vikrant Massey
- Vinay Anand
- Vinay Pathak
- Vineet Kumar
- Vineet Raina
- Vinod Kapoor
- Vinod Khanna
- Vinod Mehra
- Virendra Razdan
- Virendra Saxena
- Vishal
- Vishal Kotian
- Vishwajeet Pradhan
- Vivan Bhatena
- Vivek Mushran
- Vivek Oberoi

== W ==
- Waris Ahluwalia

== Y ==
- Yakub
- Yash Pandit
- Yash Tonk
- Yashpal Sharma
- Yatin Karyekar
- Yunus Parvez
- Yusuf Khan

== Z ==
- Zahan Kapoor
- Zakir Hussain
- Zayed Khan
- Zubeen Garg
- Zulfi Syed

== See also ==
- List of Indian film actors
- List of Indian film actresses
- List of Hindi film actresses
- List of Indian television actors
- Lists of actors
