= CIF (TV series) =

Indian television series

- Genre: Crime Fiction; Suspense; Thriller
- Starring: Aditya Srivastava; Dayanand Shetty; Dinesh Phadnis; Ansha Sayed; See below
- Country of origin: India
- Original language: Hindi
- No. of seasons: 1
- No. of episodes: 17

Production
- Running time: 40–45 minutes
- Production companies: White Sand Production, Cut2Cut Creations

Original release
- Network: Dangal TV
- Release: 7 September – 30 November 2019

CIF is an Indian police procedural television series which was aired on Dangal TV. The series stars Aditya Srivastava as Inspector Ashfaq Ali Khan and Dayanand Shetty as Inspector Hanuman Pandey. The location of the series is set in Lucknow, Uttar Pradesh, India.

Although the show is unrelated to the popular Indian police procedural CID, which ended shortly before the start of CIF, many lead actors of the show appear in it.

== Plot ==
A team of investigators examine criminal cases and strive to bring criminals to justice.

== Episodes ==
These air dates refers to release date on Dangal TV YouTube channel.

Episode no.	Title	On air date
1	Khooni Khel	25 September 2019
2	Maut Ka Tamasha	27 September 2019
3	Shadyantra	29 September 2019
4	Akad	1 October 2019
5	Aatank	3 October 2019
6	Kabar Ka Raaz	5 October 2019
7	Shikaar	17 October 2019
8	Mautana	24 October 2019
9	Chunauti	31 October 2019
10	Samundar Ke Saudagar	7 November 2019
11	Raavan	14 November 2019
12	Badla	21 November 2019
13	Dangal	28 November 2019
14	Narbhakshi	5 December 2019
15	Galti Ki Saza	12 December 2019
16	Apaharan	19 December 2019
17	Gumrah	26 December 2019

== Cast ==
=== Main ===
- Aditya Srivastava as Inspector Ashfaq Ali Khan (2019)
- Dayanand Shetty as Inspector Hanuman Pandey (2019)
- Dinesh Phadnis as Constable Shambhu Tawde (2019)
- Ansha Sayed as Sub-Inspector Meenakshi - Sharpshooter (2019)
- Abhay Shukla as Sub-Inspector Sushant Sharma (2019)
- Avdhesh Kumar as Sub-Inspector Ajay Singh (2019)

=== Recurring ===
- Piyush Mehta as Hacker Zack / Jaikishan (2019)
- Narendra Gupta as Dr. D'Souza - Senior Forensic Expert (2019)
- Vineeta Malik as Hanuman Pandey's mother (2019)
- Roop Durgapal as Dr. Sakshi Srivastav - Forensic Expert (2019)
- Kushal Punjabi as Shantibhushan Tiwary (2019)
- Sharat Saxena as DCP Surya Pratap Singh (2019)
- Meherzan Mazda (2019)
- Deepak Wadhwa (2019)
- Hiten Tejwani as Inspector Kesari Kumar - Special Officer (2019)
- Kaushal Kapoor as D.S.P. Alok Chauhan (2019)

== See also ==
- List of Hindi thriller shows
