= Vineet Kumar Chaudhary =

Indian television actor (born 1983)

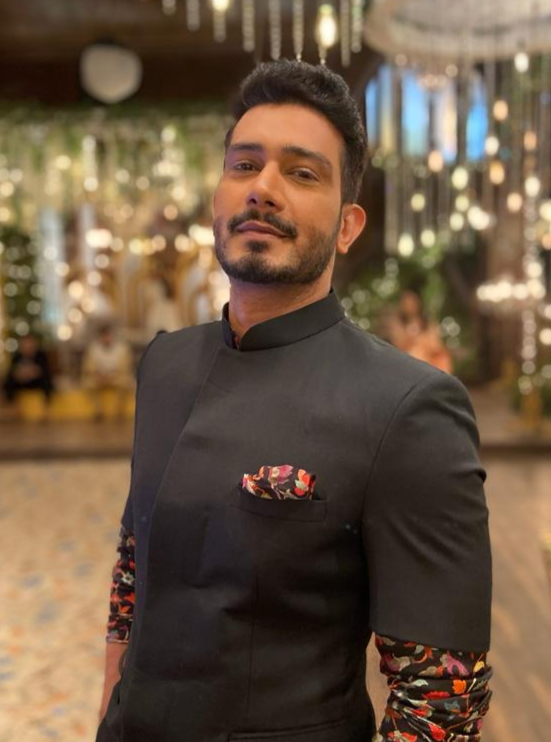
- Born: 3 December 1983 (age 42); Delhi, India
- Education: B.A. From Delhi University
- Occupation: Actor
- Years active: 2007–present
- Known for: CID; Yeh Hai Mohabbatein; Balika Vadhu; Dhruv Tara – Samay Sadi Se Pare; Karmadhikari Shanidev
- Spouse: Abhilasha Jakhar (m. 2018)
- Children: 1

Vineet Kumar Chaudhary (born 3 December 1983) is an Indian television actor. He is known for playing Suraj Kumar Khanna in Yeh Hai Mohabbatein He has appeared in the notable serials CID, Jeet Gayi Toh Piya Morey and Shaurya Aur Suhani.

== Early life ==
Vineet was born into a Hindu family in Delhi. He obtained his formal education from Delhi University. Vineet married Abhilasha Jakhar on 4 February 2018.

== Career ==
=== Early career (2007–2020) ===
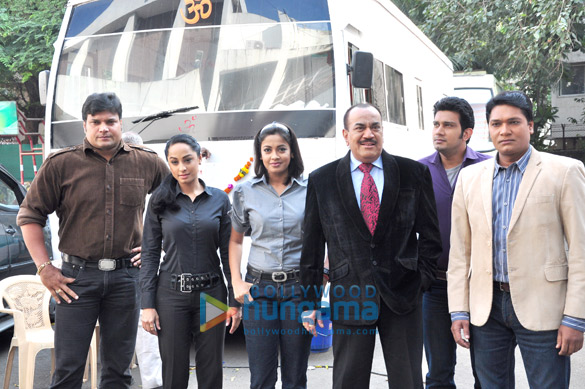
(From L-R) Dayanand Shetty, Ansha Sayed, Janvi Chheda, Shivaji Satam, Vineet Kumar Chaudhary and Aditya Srivastava on the sets of CID.

He started his career with a character Arjun Shekhawat in Anurag Basu's TV serial Love Story. Later he appeared in Shaurya Aur Suhani, CID, Jeet Gayi Toh Piya Morey He participated in the sports reality entertainment show Box Cricket League and was the team member of Pune Anmol Ratan. and he received Fogg's Coolest Player of the Match Award.

=== Breakthrough (2020–present) ===
Chaudhary had his breakthrough with the role of Rajesh Shastri in Prem Bandhan. Chaudhary also appeared in the shows Kumkum Bhagya and Bade Achhe Lagte Hain 2. It was the biggest hit of his television career. From February 2023 to October 2023, he played the role of Samrat Singh in Dhruv Tara – Samay Sadi Se Pare.

== Television ==
Year	Serial	Role	Notes	Ref.
2007–2008	Love Story	Arjun Shekhawat	Supporting Role	
2009	Shaurya Aur Suhani	Simha	Negative Role	
2010	Chotti Bahu	Rajjan Yaduvanshi	Negative Role	
2010–2011	Gunahon Ka Devta	Inspector Ranvijay Singh	Negative Role	
2012–2013	CID	Inspector Vineet	Supporting Role	
2013	CID Chhote Heroes	Inspector Vineet	Supporting Role	
2014–2016; 2018	Yeh Hai Mohabbatein	Suraj Kumar Khanna	Negative Role	
2015	Service Wali Bahu	Ayodhya Prasad	Negative Role	
2016	Balika Vadhu	Kundan Singh	Negative Role	
2016–2017	Naagin 2	Mahish	Negative Role	
2017	Rishton Ka Chakravyuh	Purushottam	Negative Role	
2018	Jeet Gayi Toh Piya Morey	Dr. Daksh Shergill	Supporting Role	
2018	Laal Ishq – Pakdau Dulha	Dracula (Episode 40)	Episodic Role	
2019; 2020	Kahaan Hum Kahaan Tum	Mahesh Yadav	Negative Role	
2020–2021	Prem Bandhan	Rajesh Shastri	Negative Role	
2021	Kumkum Bhagya	Gautam Thapar	Negative Role	
2021–2022	Bade Achhe Lagte Hain 2	Shashwat "Shashi" Babbar	Negative Role	
2022	Ghum Hai Kisikey Pyaar Meiin	Sadanand Pawle	Negative Role	
2023	Dhruv Tara – Samay Sadi Se Pare	Samrat Singh	Negative Role	
2023–2024	Karmadhikari Shanidev	Shanidev	Lead Role	

=== Reality Shows ===
Year	Show	Role
2014–2015	Box Cricket League	Contestant
2016	Box Cricket League 2	Contestant
2019	Box Cricket League 4	Contestant

== Music videos ==
Year	Title	Singer(s)
2022	Kala Mascara	Vibhas, Palvi and Mavie
