= Jimmy Nanda =

Indian actress and model

- Occupations: Actress, Model
- Beauty pageant titleholder
- Title: Gladstag Mrs. India 2007
- Years active: 2008-
- Major competitions: Gladsrag Mrs Indian 2007 (Winner); Mrs. Universe 2007 (Runner-up)

Jimmy Nanda is an Indian actress and model. She won the title of Mrs India in 2007. Nanda made her TV debut in the famous detective series CID, where she played the role of Inspector Lavanya in 2008.

== Biography ==
Nanda hails from Ahmedabad. She was crowned as Gladsrag Mrs. India 2007. Later, she took part in Mrs. Universe 2007 and became runner-up of this competition.

Later, Nanda acted in C.I.D. where she portrayed the role of Inspector Lavanya. She was last seen in the episode no.558. Later, she appeared in a Gujarati film titled Tuu To Gayo which was released in 2016. She also appeared in Ratanpur 2018 which was released in 2018.

== Filmography ==
=== Television ===
Year	Show	Role	Channel	Notes
2008 – 2009	C.I.D.	Inspector Lavanya	Sony TV	Supporting Role

=== Film ===
Year	Title	Role
2016	Tuu To Gayo	
2018	Ratanpur	
