= Pradeep Uppoor =

Indian film producer (died 2023)

Pradeep Uppoor (Hindi: प्रदीप उपूर; 18 July 1958 – 13 March 2023) was an Indian film producer. He produced Ardh Satya, Hip Hip Hurray, Aghaat (1985), Holi, Chakra (1981), and Purush. Uppoor also produced a number of commercials, television serials, documentaries, and audio-visuals under the banner of Neo Films.

In 1994 he co-launched "Fireworks Productions", a television production company, which made C.I.D. a successful police detective series.

In 2021, he was the producer of the Nail Polish which is a ZEE5 originals film.
