= Karmadhikari Shanidev =

Indian mythological television series

- Genre: Mythology
- Created by: Nikil Sinha
- Developed by: Nikil Sinha
- Screenplay by: Brij Mohan Pandey
- Story by: Brij Mohan Pandey Dialogues; Jitendra Suman
- Directed by: Neeraj Pandey; Datta khalse
- Creative directors: Amit Bhargav; Ishwarchandra Mishra
- Starring: Vineet Kumar Chaudhary
- Composers: Jitendra Panchal lyricist Neethu Pandey
- Country of origin: India
- Original language: Hindi
- No. of seasons: 1
- No. of episodes: 192

Production
- Producer: Nikil Sinha
- Cinematography: Ravi Naidu
- Editors: Satya Sharma; Grey Matter
- Camera setup: Multi-Camera
- Running time: 22-24 minutes
- Production company: Triangle Film Company

Original release
- Network: Shemaroo TV
- Release: 11 December 2023 – 20 July 2024

Karmadhikari Shanidev is an Indian mythology television series produced by Triangle Film Company and premiered on 11 December 2023 on Shemaroo TV. It stars Vineet Kumar Chaudhary as Shanidev.

== Plot ==
The story focuses on the life of God Shani Dev. Hanuman narrates the tale of Shani Dev to Narad Muni, explaining how Shani Dev acquired the title of 'Karmadhikari' and delving into the details of Shanidev's life.

== Cast ==
- Vineet Kumar Chaudhary as Shanidev (2023–2024)
- Danish Akhtar Saifi as Hanuman (2023–2024)
  - Darsh Agarwal as Child Hanuman (2024)
- Kumar Hegde as Devrishi Narada (2023–2024)
- Sandeep Mohan as Suryadev (2023–2024)
- Suhasi Dhami as
  - Devi Sandhya (2023–2024)
  - Devi Chhaya (2023–2024)
- Aparna Dixit / Zalak Desai as Devi Dhamini (2023–2024) / (2024)
- Raviz Takur as Yamraj (2023–2024)
- Tisha Kapoor as Devi Yamuna (2023–2024)
- Ginnie Virdi as Surili
- Priom Gujjar / Deepesh Gangawat as Bhagwan Vishnu (2023–2024) / (2024)
- Deblina Chatterjee / Piyali Munsi as Devi Lakshmi / Adi Parashakti (2023–2024) / (2024)
- Amit Pachori as Bhagwan Shiva (2023–2024)
- Kajal Jain as Devi Parvati / Durga (2023–2024)
- Kunal Bakshi as Devraj Indra (2023–2024)
- Devaksh Rai as Maharishi Bhringi
- Gaurav Sharma as Kamadeva
- Vinod Kapoor as Chitrarath: Devi Dhamini's father (2023–2024)
- Arpita Pandey
- Romanch Mehta as Shukracharya (2023–2024)
- Anjita Punia as Devi Bhadra: Shani's sister (2024)

== Dubbed version ==
Language	Title	Original release	Network(s)	Last aired
Odia	Karmadhikari Shanidev କର୍ମାଧିକରୀ ଶନିଦେବ	6 May 2024	Tarang TV	Ongoing

== Soundtrack ==
Nilanjana Samabhasam

Soundtrack album
- Released: 2023
- Genre: Bhakti
- Length: 0:50
- Language: Hindi
- Label: Shemaroo Entertainment
- Producer: Nikil Sinha

Tracklisting
No.	Title	Length
1.	"Nilanjana Samabhasam"	0:50
2.	"Ram Siya Ram"	3:18

== See also ==
- Karmaphal Daata Shani
- Mahima Shani Dev Ki
- Tulsidham Ke Laddu Gopal
