= Ratanpur (film) =

- Theatrical release poster
- Directed by: Vipul Sharma
- Written by: Shailesh Dodia
- Produced by: M.S. Jolly; Yogesh Pareek
- Starring: Tushar Sadhu; Haresh Dagia; Uday Dangar; Vishal Vaishya; Jimmy Nanda
- Cinematography: Prashant Gohel; Roopang Acharya
- Edited by: Roopang Acharya
- Music by: Jatin-Pratik
- Production company: Prolife Entertainment
- Release date: 16 March 2018
- Running time: 131 minutes
- Country: India
- Language: Gujarati

Ratanpur (Gujarati: રતનપુર) is a 2018 Gujarati mystery drama film starring Tushar Sadhufeatured Tushar Sadhu, Uday Dangar and Jimmy Nanda as lead characters and produced by Prolife Entertainment.

== Plot ==
Gaurav Sharma (Tushar Sadhu) is an honest IPS officer who is recently posted in the mysterious village of Ratanpur where he comes face to face with a case, a Murder, that's about to change his life and values forever.

== Cast ==
- Tushar Sadhu
- Haresh Dagia
- Uday Dangar
- Vishal Vaishya
- Jay Pandya
- Dipen Raval
- Jimmy Nanda
- Sunil Vaghela
- Jigar Bundela
- Nirmit Vaishnav
- Riya Subodh
- Parmeshwar Sirsikar
- Shivani
- Priyanka Ashok Tiwari

== Production ==
The film is loosely inspired by the true events. Despite challenges of shooting on location, Ratanpur is shot on location to preserve the authenticity of the setting, in Ratanpur village in Gujarat. Music is composed by the duo Jatin-Pratik. Playback singer Sunidhi Chauhan sung songs in the film.

| No. | Title | Singer(s) | Length |
|---|---|---|---|
| 1. | "Udu Aaje" | Sunidhi Chauhan | 3:17 |

== Release ==
The film released on 16 March 2018 across Gujarat and Maharashtra.
