= Dinesh Phadnis =

Indian television actor (1966–2023)

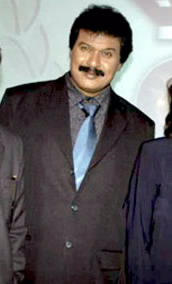
- Phadnis in 2010
- Born: 2 November 1966; Bombay, Maharashtra, India
- Died: 5 December 2023 (aged 57); Mumbai, Maharashtra, India
- Occupation: Actor
- Years active: 1998–2019
- Known for: Fredericks in CID
- Spouse: Nayana
- Children: 1

Dinesh Phadnis (2 November 1966 – 5 December 2023) was an Indian television actor. His most well-known work was playing the character of Inspector Fredericks in one of the longest running Indian TV shows, CID.

Apart from working as an Inspector in this television series, he also wrote some of the episodes of CID. He also appeared in the Bollywood film Sarfarosh and Super 30. He also wrote for a Marathi film. He lived in Shantivan, Borivali East.

== Early life ==
Phadnis was born on 2 November 1966, in Mumbai (then Bombay), Maharashtra, India. He fell in love with acting while still in school. He developed his acting abilities through a variety of stage productions and enthusiastically engaged in theatre productions. After his school, he chose to pursue acting as a full-time job with his innate talent and commitment.

== Career ==
Phadnis started his acting career in the 1990s. He auditioned for the show CID for the character of Inspector Fredericks/Freddy. The show debuted in 1998, and Phadnis's character became iconic and was well known for his humor. The show remained popular among fans until it concluded in 2018.

Apart from CID, Phadnis was also a part of several movies, such as Sarfarosh and TV shows such as Adaalat and Taarak Mehta Ka Ooltah Chashmah.

== Personal life ==
Phadnis was married to Nayana and had a daughter Tanu. He also had a granddaughter, Druvi.

== Illness and death ==
Phadnis was hospitalized on 1 December 2023. Initially it was reported as heart attack, but his CID co-star Dayanand Shetty stated that he had suffered from liver damage. His condition was initially critical, but it did not improve despite being on a ventilator. He died on 5 December 2023, 12:08 am, aged 57.

Phadnis was cremated the next morning. His co-stars from CID as well as numerous fans paid tribute to him on social media such as Instagram, where he had a huge fan following.

== Filmography ==
Year	Film	Role
1999	Sarfarosh	Sub-inspector
2000	Mela	Cameo appearance in the song 'Mela Dilon Ka'
2001	Officer	Inspector

=== Television ===
Year	Show	Role	Notes
1997	Aahat	Amit	Season 1 Episode 80
1998–2018	CID	Inspector Fredericks	
2005	CID: Special Bureau	Sub-Inspector Fredericks	
2012	Adaalat	Inspector Fredericks	Guest
2014	Taarak Mehta Ka Ooltah Chashmah	Inspector Fredericks	Guest
2019	CIF	Constable Shambhu Tawde	Supporting role
