= Dayanand Shetty =

Indian actor (born 1969)

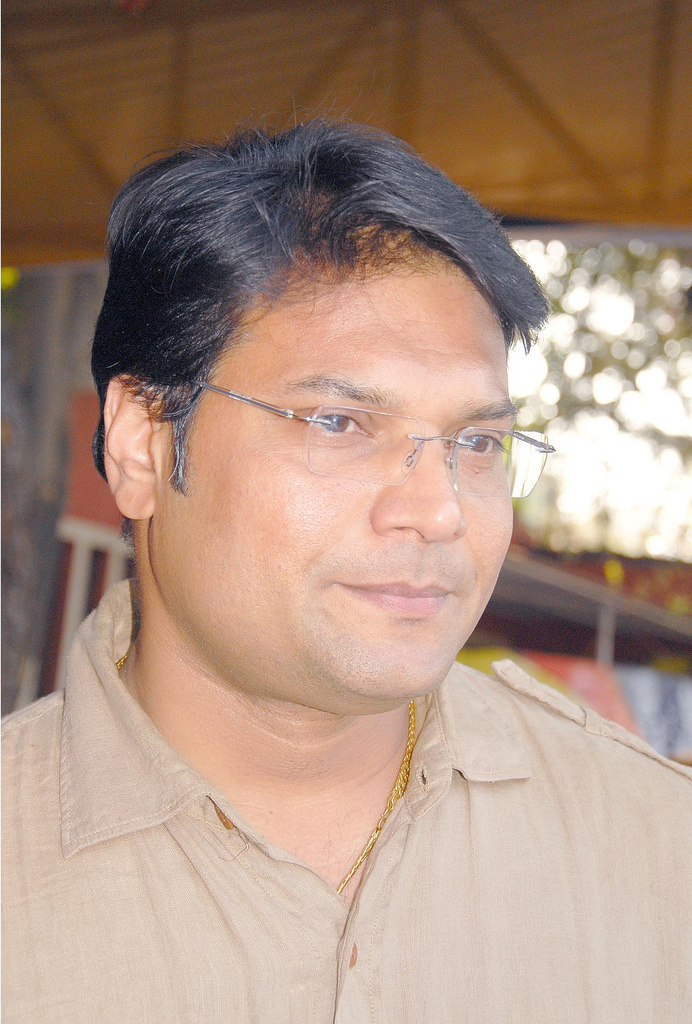
- Shetty at a Bunt community event in 2012
- Born: Dayanand Chandrashekhar Shetty; 11 December 1969 (age 56); Shirva, Mysore State, India
- Other name: Daya
- Occupation: Actor
- Years active: 1996–present
- Known for: Playing Senior Inspector Daya (CID)
- Notable work: C. I. D.; Singham Returns
- Spouse: Smitha Shetty
- Awards: 2 Gold Awards

Dayanand Chandrashekhar Shetty (born 11 December 1969) is an Indian film and television actor and model, best known for his role as Senior Inspector Daya in India's longest-running television police procedural, CID. He was inducted into the Gold Awards Hall of Fame in 2018.

== Personal life ==
Shetty was born on 11 December 1969, in a Tulu speaking Bunt family in Shirva village in Dakshina Kannada (now Udupi district) of Karnataka to Chandra Prakash Shetty and Uma Shetty. He has two sisters (Naina and Sandhya). He did his B.com from Rizvi College, Bandra in Mumbai. He married Smitha Shetty and they have a daughter, Viva Shetty.

== Career ==
Shetty is a sportsman who turned to acting due to a leg injury. He was a shot put and discus thrower, and won many prizes in these sports. He was the champion of discus throw from Maharashtra in 1996. He has acted in many commercials and has won awards as a theatre artist. He won the Best Actor award for his role in the Tulu language play Secret.

He auditioned and was selected for the role of CID officer in 1998. He is known for his role of Senior Inspector Daya in CID. He along with actors Shivaji Satam and Aditya Srivastava are the main leads of the show. He has also written for some of the episodes of CID.

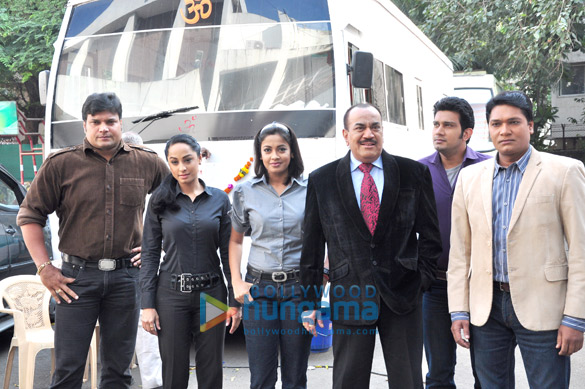
(From L-R) Dayanand Shetty, Ansha Sayed, Janvi Chheda, Shivaji Satam, Vineet Kumar Chaudhary and Aditya Srivastava on the set of CID

In CID, Senior Inspector Daya is known for his immense strength, whose name is enough to make the toughest of criminals break down. Daya's signature dialogue in CID is "Jab Daya ka hath padta hai, to muh ke andar daaton se piano bajne lagta hai" (meaning "When Daya slaps someone, then a piano plays in the mouth by the teeth"). One of the most famous dialogues in CID is that of ACP Pradyuman asking him, "Daya darwaaza tod do" (meaning "Daya, break the door"). This dialogue became so popular that it is even used in the film Singham Returns and Singham Again in one of its most appreciated scenes. In CID, Daya is also critical in finding clues to solve cases. Although tough in appearance, he is also soft-mannered and sympathetic in nature and is always the first one to support team members and others when they need help the most.

Shetty has acted in TV commercials, plays and films. He also won the "Best Looking Guy" vote, conducted by Indian Television in 2002. He also participated in Jhalak Dikhhla Jaa (Season 4), a dance reality show.

A song was recorded for CID episode (aired on 21 January 2012), which was a lullaby sung by Shetty and his fellow actors Shivaji Satam and Aditya Shrivastava. His talent as a singer has been appreciated in talk shows like Movers and Shakers as well.

The movies he has acted in include Johnny Gaddaar, Runway, Singham Returns and Singham Again.

Shetty has made guest appearances in shows like Jassi Jaissi Koi Nahin and Kkusum. He has acted in Gutur Gu, which is a silent comedy show (in both season one and two). He has made appearances as a celebrity guest in shows including Deal Ya No Deal, Entertainment Ke Liye Kuch Bhi Karega (season 4), Kahani Comedy Circus Ki and Aapka Sapna Hamara Apna.

He participated in 5th season of Khatron Ke Khiladi doing many stunts, but was eventually eliminated.

Shetty and Shivaji Satam appeared as celebrity guests on the TV show Sa Re Ga Ma Pa L'il Champs (in the Independence Day Special episode of 2011). Shetty, Satam, Aditya Srivastava and Narendra Gupta also appeared on Kaun Banega Crorepati in 2014. He has won the best-supporting actor award (for the role of Senior Inspector Daya in CID) in the Gold Awards 2012.

Shetty and Srivastava teamed up for a travel and food-based YouTube non-fiction show called Safarkhana in 2024.

Shetty also played the role of ACP Daya in film Singham Again.

In 2025, Shetty was cast as Parbat Singh in the Netflix series Single Papa along with Kunal Khemu, Prajakta Koli, Manoj Pahwa, and Ayesha Raza Mishra, where he played a commendable role of a male nanny. The series and his character received positive response from critics and viewers.

== Filmography ==
=== Films ===
- All films are in Hindi unless otherwise noted.

Year	Title	Role	Notes	Ref.
1996	Diljale	Gunman		
2007	Johnny Gaddaar	Shiva		
2009	Runway	Police Inspector		
2014	Singham Returns	Sr. Inspector Daya		
2022	Govinda Naam Mera	Inspector Javed Khan		
2023	Yaan Superstar	Bala Krishna	Tulu film	
2023	Navras Katha Collage	Pakistani Police Officer		
2024	Singham Again	ACP Daya		

=== Television ===
Year	Title	Role	Notes	Ref.
1998–2018; 2024–2025	CID	Sr. Inspector Daya		
2005	CID: Special Bureau	Sr. Inspector Daya		
2010	Jhalak Dikhhla Jaa 4	Contestant	8th place	
2010–2012	Gutur Gu	Harpreet Singh		
2012	Gutur Gu	Daya Singh	Season 2	
2014	Gutur Gu	Bully's neighbour	Season 3	
2014	CID Vs Adaalat – Karmyudh	Sr. Inspector Daya	Telefilm	
2014	Fear Factor: Khatron Ke Khiladi 5	Contestant	13th place	
2019	CIF	Inspector Hanuman Pandey		
2021	Savdhaan India	Host		
2024	Safarkhana with Aditya & Daya	Host	YouTube series	
2025	Single Papa	Parbat Singh	Netflix series	

==== Special appearance ====
Year	Title	Role	Ref.
2005	Jassi Jaissi Koi Nahin	Himself	
2005	Kkusum	Himself	
2011	Surya The Super Cop	Sr. Inspector Daya	
2012	Adaalat - CID Viruddh Adaalat	Sr. Inspector Daya	
2014	Taarak Mehta Ka Ooltah Chashmah	Sr. Inspector Daya	
2016	Gupp Chupp	Rocky	

== Awards and nominations ==
Year	Awards	Category	Work	Result	Ref
2013	Nickelodeon Kids' Choice Awards India	Favorite Actor	CID	Nominated	
2016	Nickelodeon Kids' Choice Awards India	Favorite Actor	CID	Nominated	
2011	Gold Awards	Best Supporting Actor	CID	Won	
2018	Gold Awards	Hall of Fame	CID	Won	
