= CID (Indian TV series) =

Indian crime television series (1998–2025)

- Genre: Crime Fiction; Suspense; Thriller
- Created by: B. P. Singh
- Written by: Nitika Kanwar; Shridhar Raghavan; Shashank Shekhar; Tanmay Singh; Chirag Salian
- Directed by: Ishwar Singh; Santosh Shetty; Siba Misra; Salil Singh; Nandu Kaale; Sachindra Vats
- Creative directors: Christabelle D'Souza; Prabal Baruah
- Starring: Shivaji Satam; Aditya Srivastava; Dayanand Shetty; Narendra Gupta; Dinesh Phadnis; Shraddha Musale; Hrishikesh Pandey; Ajay Nagrath; Ansha Sayed; Janvi Chheda
- Country of origin: India
- Original language: Hindi
- No. of seasons: 2
- No. of episodes: 1,651

Production
- Producers: B.P. Singh (season 1–2); Pradeep Uppoor (season 1); Deepak Dhar (season 2); Rajesh Chadha (season 2); Renu bp Singh (season 2)
- Running time: 40–46 minutes
- Production companies: Fireworks Productions (season 1); Banijay Asia (season 2); Fiction Factory (season 2)

Original release
- Network: Sony Entertainment Television
- Release: 21 January 1998 – 14 December 2025

Related
- C.I.D. Kolkata Bureau

CID is an Indian police procedural television series that premiered on Sony Entertainment Television on 21 January 1998. The series was created by B. P. Singh and produced by Singh and Pradeep Uppoor under the banner of Fireworks Productions in season 1; Deepak Dr, Rajesh Chadha, A. Singh and B.P. Singh under Banijay Asia in season 2 alongside Fiction Factory. It features Shivaji Satam as ACP Pradyuman, Aditya Srivastava as Sr. Inspector Abhijeet, Dayanand Shetty as Sr. Inspector Daya, Dinesh Phadnis as Inspector Fredricks and Narendra Gupta as Dr. Salunkhe.

The location of CID is set in Mumbai. The series is one of the longest-running television series in India. The series first premiered on 21 January 1998 and aired its 500th episode on 18 January 2008, 1000th episode on 13 September 2013, 1500th episode on 4 March 2018, last episode on 27 October 2018. The series renewed for a second season, which aired from 21 December 2024 to 14 December 2025.The second season also started streaming simultaneously on Netflix from 21 February 2025.

== Cast ==
=== Main ===
- Shivaji Satam as ACP Pradyuman (1998–2018; 2024–2025). Initially referred as Sr. Inspector Pradyuman in the first few episodes after which he got a promotion to ACP in episode "The Case of the Thief Within – I" and had been referred to ACP Pradyuman since. In "CID Par Grahan – II" , it was revealed that his full name is ACP Pradyuman Naik Satam.
- Dinesh Phadnis as Inspector Fredricks "Freddy" (1998–2018). He first appeared in episode "Kissa Raat Ke Shikhar Ka – I", but his role as Sub-Inspector started in episode "The Case of the Third Man – I" where he was initially referred as Sub Inspector Prince/Michael/Joseph but referred as Fredricks from episode "The Case of the Last Five Minutes – I".
- Dayanand Shetty as Sr. Inspector Daya (1998–2018; 2024–2025). He first appeared in episode "The Case of the Anonymous Threats – I" as Sub Inspector Daya. He is referred to as Senior Inspector Daya in later episodes.
- Narendra Gupta as Dr. R. P. Salunkhe (1998–2003, 2005, 2007–2018; 2024–2025). He made his debut in the episode "The Case of the Incomplete Letter", where he was initially referred to as Dr. Verma but referred to as Dr. Salunkhe from episode "The Case of the Burnt Letter – I".
- Aditya Srivastava as Sr. Inspector Abhijeet (1998; 1999–2018; 2024–2025). He first appeared as character named 'Paresh', who stole ACP's gun in episode "The Case of the Stolen Gun". His role as Inspector Abhijeet started in the episode "The Case of the Stolen Dynamite – I".
- Shraddha Musale as Dr. Tarika (2007–2018; 2025). Her debut episode was "The Don's Final Revenge". She re-entered in Season-2 through the episode "Death in the Jungle".
- Ansha Sayed as Inspector Purvi (2006-2008; 2011–2018; 2024–2025); she was first seen in episodic roles—as Chanda in "Case of the Double Identity", Khushi in "Case of the Bomb Robbery", Pallavi in "7 Days to Die", and Pamela in "The Gift". Her first episode as Sub-Inspector Purvi was Kissa Paagal Ashiq Kaa.
- Hrishikesh Pandey as Inspector Sachin (2010–2016; 2025). He first appeared in episode "Khooni Deewar" under the alias Siddharth, but is later revealed to be an undercover cop and is introduced by ACP as Inspector Sachin in episode "Maut ka Aashirwad". He was last seen in episode "Bank Robbery". He re-entered season 2 through the episode "Gilheri Rakshas". Also in CID Special Bureau, he played the role of Inspector Abhimanyu.
- Ajay Nagrath as Inspector Pankaj (2012–2018; 2024–2025); He made his debut in the episode "CID Par Grahan – III"
- Janvi Chheda as Inspector Shreya (2012–2016; 2018; 2025); She made her debut in episode "Raaz Sar Aur Haath Ka" where she was introduced along with Sub-Inspector Vineet. She was last seen in episode "Maut Ka Hathoda". She returned as an Intelligence Bureau Inspector in episode "CID 20 Saal Baad". She returns in Season 2 through the episode "ACP Pradyuman tricks CID".

=== Recurring ===
- Afshan Khan as Sub-Inspector Mridula (1998). She first appeared in episode "Case of the Thief Within – I".
- Ashutosh Gowariker as Sr. Inspector Virendra (1998–1999). He first appeared in episode "The Case of the Thief Within – I". His last episode in the show was episode "The Case of Missing Fugitive – II". He was transferred.
- Ashwini Kalsekar as Sub-Inspector Asha (1998–2004). She first appeared in the episode "The Case of the Second Statement - Part 1". Her last episode was episode "Case of the Dazed Man – II".
- Manoj Verma as Sub Inspector Vikram Shinde/Sub Inspector Sawant (1998). He first appeared in episode "Case of the Poison - I".
- Kaushal Kapoor as Sub Inspector Shailesh Kumar (1998)
- Ramdas Jadhav as Sub Inspector Rajan/Sub Inspector Rodriguez (1998)
- Narendra Sachar as Sub Inspector (1998)
- Nasir Sheikh as Sub Inspector (1998)
- Dhananjay Mandrekar as Sub-Inspector Sudhakar (1998–2005). He appeared as Sub Inspector Bhonsle in starting episodes but after episode 35 he was referred as Sub Inspector Sudhakar. He was last seen in "The Case of the Stolen Ring – I".
- Vaquar Shaikh as Inspector Jeet (1998). He appeared in episode "The Case of the Contract Killer"
- Sanjay Shemkalyanee as Sub-Inspector Desai (1998)
- Dilip Kulkarni as DCP Dipankar Deshmukh (1998–2005). He was first seen in episode "The Thief Within - I" and was last seen in "The Case of the Invisible Bullet- II".
- Sanjeev Seth as Sub-Inspector Sanjeev (1998). He first appeared in episode "The Case of the Anonymous Threats – I". Additionally, he also appeared as a case victim named Sanjeev in episode "The Case of The Red Cloth – I".
- Anuj Gupta as Sub Inspector Vivek
- Tushar Dalvi as Inspector Jayant (1999). He first appeared in "The Case of Cross Connection – I". He was last seen in "The Case Of Stolen Dynamite – ll".
- Manav Gohil as Inspector Daksh (2004–2005) His first episode as a cop was "Trust Me, Trust Me Not – I". His last episode was "Trail in London – II". He was killed by Nakul.
- Smita Bansal as Inspector Aditi (2004–2005) Her first episode was "The Case of the Haunted Building – I". Her last episode was "Mad Bomber – II". She died in the episode.
- Surendra Pal as DCP (2005). His first episode was "The Case of the Killer Lake – l". He was last seen in episode "Face Off – lll".
- Kavita Kaushik as Sub-Inspector Anushka (2005–2006). She appeared in episodes "Trail in London" (all parts) as a Central Intelligence Sub-Inspector who secretly helps ACP Pradyuman. She enters CID in episode "Poison In The Nail – l". Her last episode was "Secret of the Code No. 571E1115".
- Sai Deodhar as Sub-Inspector Priyanka (2005) Her first episode was "Case of the Dead Waiter – I". Her last episode was "Trail in London – lll"
- Rajeev Khandelwal as ACP Prithviraj (2005, 2008) He appeared as the ACP in episodes: "Face Off – lll & lV" and "Trail in London" (all parts) when ACP Pradyuman was in London for the investigation. He was also in the episode "The Case of the Missing Bride" as himself.
- B. P. Singh as DCP Shamsher Singh Chitrole (2005; 2012–2016). His first appearance was as DIG Shamsher Singh in the episode "Face Off-lll". After a long time he appears as DCP Shamsher Singh Chitrole, the senior of the CID team in "Kissa Daya Aur Lapata Bacche Ka" He is an egoistic man who is also quite funny sometimes. He was a friend of ACP Pradyuman in college. He was last seen in "Karo Ya Maro" series.
- Vivek Mashru as Inspector Vivek (2006–2012). His first episode was "The Case of the Killer Eyes". He was last seen in episode "Rahasyomoy Bullet – III".
- Amar Upadhyay as Inspector Rishi (2006). He appeared as an inspector in episode "Murder in the Safety Vault". He joined the CID in that episode when he came to K for spend holidays. He was also seen as a supporting character named Harry in episode "Return of the Clown".
- Alka Verma as Sub-Inspector Muskaan (2006–2007). Her first episode was episode "Red Rose Killer". "The Case of Inspector Daya's Abduction" was her last episode. She was transferred.
- Megha Gupta as Sub-Inspector Devyana (2007–2008) Her first episode was "The Don's Final Revenge" and she played her character till episode 492 "Mystery Of A Train Passenger". But then she was not seen again for 11 consecutive episodes and officially her last episode was "Bhoot Bangala".
- Parinita Seth as Sub-Inspector Kaveri (2008). She first appeared as Shreya in episode "The Great Diamond Robbery" and as Rohini in episode "The Curse of the Rose Queen", but as a cop her first appearance was in Episode "Khoon Bhari Holi", recruited by ACP Pradyuman through interview. In Episode 524 she was revealed to have gone for a Special Training in Delhi. But she made a comeback in episode "Triangular Bullet's Mystery". Her last episode was "Khooni Goli Ka Rahasya".
- Jimmy Nanda as Sub-Inspector Lavanya (2008–2009) She was first seen spying on the CID team in episode "Khoon Bhari Holi". She was revealed as the new CID officer in episode "Katil Kaun Dohri Uljhan". She was last seen in episode "Students Mass Murderer".
- Vaishnavi Dhanraj as Sub-Inspector Tasha Kumar (2009–2010). She first appeared as an episodic character named Nathalia in episode "Qaatil Dank". Her first episode as a CID cop was episode "Anjaan Laash". Her final appearance was the episode "Khatre Mein Tasha" in which she dies.
- Jasveer Kaur as Sub-Inspector Kajal Kumar (2010–2012); she was first seen in "The Case of the Dangerous Virus", then as a contract killer in the episode "The Case of the Mysterious Gift", and as a drug seller in the episode "The Case of the Talking Parrot". Her first episode as a cop was "Maut Ka Aashirwad"; her last episode was "Khoon Ka Deewana".
- Abhay Shukla as Sub Inspector Nikhil (2011–2016); his first appearance was as a reporter in "Traitors in CID", then as security guard Ishaan in the episode "Once Upon A Time in Mumbaai", and as a shopkeeper in "Bhutiya Ladki Ka Raaz". He also played a negative role under his own name, Abhay, in the episode "AKAKR Part-9". His first episode as a CID sub-inspector was "Qatl Ka Raaz Mare Hue Qatil Ke Paas"; he was last seen in the episode "Raaz Machli Ka"as a Inspector .
- Vineet Kumar Chaudhary as Sub-Inspector Vineet (2012–2013); His first episode was "Raaz Sar Aur Haath Ka" where he was introduced along with Sub-Inspector Shreya. He was last seen in episode "Raaz Teen Laashon Ka"
- Vikas Kumar as Senior Inspector Rajat (2012–2013); He joined in episode "Khooni Paani" as Senior Inspector. He was last seen in episode "Ped Ka Rahasya".
- Deepak Shirke as EX-ACP Digvijay (2012–2013); He was brought into CID by DCP Chitrole as the new ACP in place of Pradyuman in episodes: "CID Par Grahan – II, III, IV". It was later revealed that he had committed a crime long ago and was suspended by DCP Chitrole .
- Tarun Khanna as Inspector Suraj (2012–2013); He first appeared as a supporting character named Rohan in episode "Gawah Bana Shikaar" and as Rajveer in "Case of the Hotel Murder Mystery". His first episode as a cop was "CID Par Grahan – III". He was last seen in episode "Raaz Haddiyo Ki Crockery Ka"
- Neha Gadoria as Trainee Officer Roma (2012); Her first episode was "Khoon Khabri Ka". She died in episode "Khatre Mein CID Officer – II" due to being kidnapped and excessive blood loss
- Maninder Singh as Inspector Dushyant Hemraj (2014); His first episode was "Bus Hijack – I". His last episode was "Kulhaadi Ka Raaz"
- Gaurav Khanna as Inspector Kavin (2014); His first episode was "Bus Hijack – II". His last episode was "Band Kamre Mein Laash".
- Tanya Abrol as Sub-Inspector Jaywanti Dey (2014–2017); Her first episode was "Action Jackson". She was last seen in episode "Bank Robbery"
- Jagjit Athwal as Assistant Sub-Inspector Vansh (2014–2017); His first episode was "Mumbai Ki Chawl Ka Rahasya – I". He was last seen in "Ek Anokha Qatil"
- Ankur Sharma Kabir as Assistant Sub-Inspector Karan (2014–2015); His first episode as a cop was "Mumbai Ki Chawl Ka Rahasya – I"
- Vikas Salgotra as Assistant Sub-Inspector Mayur (2014–2017); His first episode was "Mumbai Ki Chawl Ka Rahasya – I". He was last seen in "Gumshuda Bachchi ka Raaz"
- Pooja Khatri as Assistant Sub-Inspector Ishita (2014–2017); Her first episode was "Mumbai Ki Chawl Ka Rahasya – I". She was last seen in "Karo Ya Maro – III"
- Amaani Satrala as Assistant Sub-Inspector Divya (2014–2015); Her first episode was "Mumbai Ki Chawl Ka Rahasya – I". She was last seen in "Badle Ki Aag"
- Abid Shaikh as Assistant Sub-Inspector Vikram (2014); His first episode was "Mumbai Ki Chawl Ka Rahasya – I"
- Vivana Singh as Cyber Inspector Ritu (2016–2017); She was initially seen in "Khooni Chupata Nahi". She was last seen in "Raaz Nakli Pistol Aur Asli Khooni Ka"
- Shweta Salve as Supervisor Sheetal (2018); She appeared as a supervisor who monitored the CID team in the episode "Rahasyamai Gavah". She died in episode "Rahasyamayi Hathyar" while saving many lives from a mysterious weapon
- Dr. Pritam Phatnani as Dr. Phatnani. He first appeared in "The Case of the Poison – I". His last appearance was in "The Case of the Talkative Skeleton – II".
- Mouli Ganguly as Dr. Amrita (2002). She appeared as junior Forensic Doctor in episode "The Case Of the Invisible Bullet – I" when Dr. Salunkhe was accused by ACP for hiding the bullet used in the murder.
- Shweta Kawatra as Dr. Niyati Pradhan (2003; 2005–2007). She first starred in "The Case of Nailing the Suspect – I". She was last seen in "The Case of Perfect Murder".
- Mandeep Bhandar as Dr. Vrinda Wagle (2003–2004). She first appeared in "The Case of the Red Rain – l". Her last appearance was in "The Case of the Dazed Man – II".
- Mona Ambegaonkar as Dr. Anjalika Deshmukh (2004–2005) Her first episode was episode "Case of the Invisible Bomb – I". She was last seen in "Murder By Marriage – I".
- Priya Wal as Dr. Nyla Rajadhyaksha (2006–2007). Her first episode was "The Case of the Killer Statues". Her last episode was "The Case of the Dangerous Lady".
- Manini Mishra as Dr. Sonali Barwe (2010–2011); she was first seen as actress Khushi in the episode "The Secret of the Deadly Chest", and as fashion designer Menka in the episode "Zehrily Dress". Her first episode as a forensic expert was "Rahasyamayi Darwaza".
- Saanand Verma as Lab Assistant (2012);
- Kuldeep Singh as Dr. Vaibhav (2014–2015); He appeared as a junior forensic doctor. His first episode was "Mumbaicha Dabbawala"
- Parul Rai as Dr. Gargi (2024–2025). She was initially seen in the episode "Sniper Rifle Murderer".
- Shweta Kanoje as Neha (1998)
- Rahil Azam as Nakul Pradyuman / Rajeev (2004–2005; 2015) ACP Pradyuman's criminal son first seen in episode "Murders at Sunrise – II" and killed by Pradyuman in episode "Trail in London – III".
- Sparsh Khanchandani as Shreya, Abhijeet's mute adoptive daughter (2009; 2014; 2024-2025). She was initially seen in "Nanhi Gavah", later in the episodes "Innocent in Danger Part 1 & 2". Reintroduced in Season 2's "Sniper Rifle Murderer" and is a recurring character. Reprises her role from Season 1.
- KK Goswami as Dhenchu (2013–2014; 2016–2018; 2024); He is an informer introduced by DCP Chitrole in episode "CID Ke Chhote Fans" of CID Chhote Heroes.
- Bhavesh Balchandani as Jimmy(2018). He died in the episode "Rahasmayi Hatyar - 1".
- Yagya Bhasin as Arjun (2018); Nakul's son, ACP Pradyuman's grandson (2018)
- Saumya Saraswat as Sub-Inspector Avni (2024–2025) She was initially seen in the episode "Sniper Rifle Murderer".
- Priyasha Bhardwaj as Inspector Bhoomi (2025) She was initially seen in the episode " Ticket to Heaven ".
- Lekha Prajapati as Sub-Inspector Kritika (2025) She was initially seen in the episode "Ticket to Heaven".
- Devender Chaudhary as DIG Pratap (2025) He was initially seen in the episode "Mechanical Trap".

=== Guest ===
- Shashi Kiran as Librarian (1998)
- Sahil Chaddha as Ajay Sethia (1998)
- Sanjay Swaraj as Prakash Kapoor, Lalit (1998) Puneet (2014) Abhay (2016)
- Milind Gawali as Sailesh (1998), Alok (1999), Devdhar (1999), Anupam (2002), Kuber (2003), Shyaman (2004)
- Girish Sonar as Tipnis (1998), Reporter Raghu (1999)
- Mohan Gokhale as Suvarna (1998), Kavi (1999)
- Achyut Potdar as Kundan Seth (1998)
- Akhilendra Mishra as Mr. Chitnis (1998)
- Shailendra Srivastav as Kidnapper (1998) Sudhir (1999) Paresh (2002) Kimu And Bacchu (2003) Security Guard (2006) Chotu (2009) Shera (2012) Vidhaan (2013) Mannu (2014) Gang Leader (2015) Balbir (2016) Adv Jayant (2017)
- Anant Jog as Adv. Jagtap, Shashank (1998), Chandresh (2006)
- Nagesh Bhonsle as Jeeva (1998) Babulal (1999) Gangaram (2000) Kalia (2007) krakota (2018)
- Madan Jain as Naveen Kumar (1999)
- Daya Shankar Pandey as Hariah Kidnaper (1999) as Thief Baala (2004)
- Pavan Malhotra as Jeevan/kailash (1999), Ramesh (2001), Mahesh (2001), Satish (2002), Robin (2007)
- Rajesh Khera as Jagdish (1999), Mangal (2000), Dushyant (2000), Dr Alok (2001), Badshah (2001), Johnny (2002), Kedar (2002), Rajiv (2004), Film Director (2004), Dance Choreographer (2004), Jaan (2006), Vishwajeet (2006)
- Ravi Jhankal as Nagesh (1998), Kamalkant (1999), Kishore lal (1999), Kumar (1999), Dr. Brijendra (real) (2001), Moti (2002), ACP's friend (2004), Dr. Vikas (2006), Virendra (2010)
- Akshay Anand as Bharat Saxena (1999), Rajeev (2004)
- Aman Verma as Anuj (1998) Akash (1999) Johnny (2006)
- Pradeep Kabra as Babu • Madan • Amardeep • Amrish • Ashok • Balwant's Employee • Birju • Deenbandhu's Employee • Dinesh • Don's Goon • Draco • Drug Seller • Duhikanda • Goon • Jabban • Jackie • Katarpatia • Kedar • Kedar's Driver • Makarand • Nimesh • Pantu Nishana • Pirate DVD Seller's Employee • Poacher • Pradeep • Prakash • Prateek • Shera • Subbu (2000-2018)
- Manav Kaul as Neeraj (2000), Vikrant's brother (2000), Kantora (2003), Suraj (2006).
- Shrivallabh Vyas as CBI Officer Shamsher (2000), Baldev (2001), Dr. Sahil (2001), DIG Baldev Raj (2002), Retd. Judge Raja Rao (2005), Lalchand (2007), Mr.Trout (2007), Jeevan Das (2007)
- Manoj Joshi as Ranjan (2000), Drug lord (2000), Mahesh (2002), Dr Kanu (2002)
- Aasif Sheikh as Varun Episodes : "The Case of the Mysterious Truck PART I-II" (2005 ), as Raghav Episode : "Paheli Laash Ke Tukdon Ki" (2009)
- Adi Irani as Deepak (2001), Radio Manager Raman (2006), Tejpal (2016)
- Nawazuddin Siddiqui as Alex (2001)
- Prem Chopra as Raj (2001)
- Om Puri as Sunder alias ACP Jose Santos in episode "The Case of the Counterfeit Cop".(2001)
- Sanjay Mishra as Rajesh (2001)
- Kashmera Shah as Kinnari (2001)
- Milind Gunaji as Johnny (2001)
- Sarita Joshi as Advocate Suhasini (2001)
- Sanjay Batra as Vinay (2001)
- Mushtaq Khan as Bacchu (2001)
- Madhukar Toradmal as Business man Gupta, victim's father
- Dinesh Hingoo as Builder Chunnilal (2001)
- Gufi Paintal as Chander (2001)
- Viju Khote as Judge (2002), Deaf man (2006)
- Bhagyashree as Nupur (2001)
- Shishir Sharma as Dr Kumar, Arjun , Prakash (1998), Shailesh, Parmod (1998)
- Arif Zakaria as Chandan (2002)
- Deepak Qazir as Taxi Driver (2000)
- Zakir Hussain as Kishor Bus Driver (2004)
- Satyajit Sharma as Sectary (2004)
- Kapil Dev as himself in episode "Howzzat?" (2003)
- Sudhir as Dr Kailash / Jinjaar/ Mr. Eliott (2003)
- Ananya Khare as Shilpa (2002), Sunita (2004)
- Rajesh Khattar as Pramod (2000), Rajesh (2006)
- Bhairavi Raichura as Reshma (2005)
- Abhijeet Sawant as himself (2005)
- Makarand Deshpande as Director Man Eater (2005)
- Rajat Kapoor as Tanuj (2005)
- Yashpal Sharma as Madhu (1998) Nanhe (2002) Baba (2005)
- Sadashiv Amrapurkar as Subbu (2005)
- Baba Sehgal as himself (2006)
- Mandira Bedi as Reshma (2001), Sagarika (2005)
- Bharat Kapoor as Sudhakar (1998) and Intelligence Officer Raman Kapoor (2002)
- Kunika as Rakhi (2001)
- Rajiv Paul as Jeevan (2000)
- Murli Sharma as Giri (2000), Govinda (2004), Contract killer(2006), Dr O (2007)
- Shahbaz Khan as Karan (2006), Don (2007)
- Kanwarjit Paintal as mute man (2006)
- Lilliput as Blind Man (2006)
- Deepshikha Nagpal as Lavanya Dineja a Tarot Card Reader Ep: Maut Ka Saudagar, Vyoma, Sudeep's Wife, Ep430:The Invisible Eye Witness (2006)
- Shilpa Shinde as Sheetal in "The Case of Mysterious Shadows" (2006)
- Vishal Kotian as RJ Sunny (2006)
- Melissa Pais as Alice in episode: Murder in FM 97.1 (2006)
- Mihir Mishra as Keni Raj in "Body in the Suitcase". (2006)
- Dalljiet Kaur as Reshma/Neha in "Body in the Suitcase" (2006), Sreeja in "The Invisible Eye Witness" (2006), Julie / Sandhya in "Hand in the Fish" (2006), Poonam in "Aatank" (2006).
- Narayani Shastri as Sunanda, Abhijeet's Friend Parthav's Wife in "The Mysterious Gift". (2006)
- Salman Khan as himself (2009) Khooni Piracy Racket in (Episode 583) and (2014) Salman Ki Kick in (Episode 1107 and 1108)
- R. Madhavan as himself (2009) Mystery Code Murders in (Episode 556)
- Avantika Shetty as Mansi(2009) in Students Mass Murder, as Ruhi(2009) in Bhoola bhatka
- Sajid Khan as himself (2009)
- Mahek Chahal as herself (2009)
- Rituraj Singh as Deven, Hiten (2009)
- Inder Kumar as himself (2009)
- Sarfaraz Khan as himself (2009)
- Yami Gautam as Ananya (2010) (episode 642, "Girl in Coffin")
- Lavanya Tripathi as Sakshi in the case 'Maut ka Ashirvad' (Episode 619) (2010)
- Nikhil Guha Roy as Vijay (2009), Aman (2009), Anuj (2010), Sid (2011), Nitin (2011), Kunal (2012), Rishi (2013), Dr. Harshit (2013), Arun (2013), Hardik (2014), Sarthak, Randhir, Sundar and Vikram. He also appeared in "Maut ka Ashirwad" (2010) and "Aakhri Chunauti" (2010) as Sub-Inspector Kajal's brother Rahul Kumar.
- Mahesh Manjrekar as H.D. (Herpes Dongara) (2010) He acted as a dangerous criminal who kidnapped all the CID officers and forensic experts and left India. Later in episode 664 Abhijeet shot him and he died.
- Dino Morea as Nitin (2010), himself (2011)
- Emraan Hashmi as himself (2010), Director Abraham (2011) and Raghuram "Raghu" Rathore aka Mr. X (2015).
- Sonalika Prasad as Sheela in "Jhagdalu Aurat" (2015).
- Prachi Desai as herself (2010).
- Ronit Roy as K.D Pathak from Adaalat (2010, 2012, 2014)
- Rani Mukerji as herself (2011)
- Shaji Choudhary as Gangster (2003), Trilok (2008), Heera (2009), Nibo, Goga (2011), Shera, Vikram, Mewaram (2012)
- Sidharth Shukla as Karan in episode 747 (2011)
- Aamir Khan as Senior Inspector Surjan Singh Shekhawat (2012)
- Kareena Kapoor Khan as herself (2012)
- Akshay Kumar as Shiva (2012) and as Rowdy Rathore (2012).
- Sonakshi Sinha as Paro (2012), herself (2013)
- Imran Khan as himself (2013)
- Tushar Kapoor as Sukhi (2013),as Vikash Singh (2014)
- Vinay Pathak as Mintoo Hassan (2013)
- Vishakha Singh as Manpreet (2013)
- Akanksha Puri as Nandita Menon (2015)
- Sunny Deol as Saran Jeet Singh Talwar aka Singh Saab (2013) and Ajay Mehra (2016)
- Chandan Madan as Akhil/Tej/Sumeet/Samrat/Manav/Sameer (2011–2018)
- Dilip Joshi as Jethalal Champaklal Gada from Taarak Mehta Ka Ooltah Chashmah (2014)
- Disha Vakani as Daya Jethalal Gada from Taarak Mehta Ka Ooltah Chashmah (2014)
- Gurucharan Singh as Roshan Singh Harjeet Singh Sodhi from Taarak Mehta Ka Ooltah Chashmah (2014)
- Shyam Pathak as Informer (2004) as Patrakaar Popatlal from Taarak Mehta Ka Ooltah Chashmah (2014)
- Munmun Dutta as Babita Krishnan Iyer from Taarak Mehta Ka Ooltah Chashmah (2014)
- Mandar Chandwadkar as Aatmaram Tukaram Bhide from Taarak Mehta Ka Ooltah Chashmah (2014)
- Jimmy Sheirgill as Vishnu Sharma (2014)
- Anu Malik as himself (2014)
- Jas Arora as Sunny / Pathan
- Jackky Bhagnani as Abhimanyu Kaul (2014)
- Rashami Desai as Sakshi (2014)
- Govinda as Armaan (2014)
- Saif Ali Khan as Yudi Jaitely (2014)
- Barkha Singh as Sona/Myra (2014)
- Shraddha Kapoor as herself (2014)
- Sidharth Malhotra as himself (2014)
- Sunny Leone as Ragini (2014)
- Faisal Khan (2014)
- Thakur Anoop Singh as Daya (2014) in episode: Daya v/s Daya
- Varun Dhawan as himself (2015) in episode : Varun Dhawan Khatre Mein
- Shah Rukh Khan as himself in Episode 1316 (Hotel Red Star) (2015)
- Ajay Devgn as Singham in CID Mein Singham (2014), Action Jackson (Episode 1162).
- Sushant Singh Rajput as Byomkesh Bakshi (2015)
- Anand Tiwari as Ajit Kumar Bandhopadhyay (2015)
- Ali Asgar as himself in Ali Ki Khalbali (2015)
- Diganth as himself (episode 1288) (2015)
- Karan Grover as himself (episode 1288) (2015)
- Anushka Ranjan as herself (episode 1288) (2015)
- Rahul Dev as Katori Damta. He played the role in Karo Ya Maro story arc. (2016)
- Gauri Tonk as Dolly Herpes Dongara, wife of Herpes Dongara taking revenge from Abhijeet for Herpes's death in the Karo Ya Maro story arc. (2016)
- John Abraham as Rocky Handsome (2016)
- Abbas–Mustan as themselves (2017)
- Kiara Advani as herself (2017)
- Tigmanshu Dhulia as Barbosa, Leader of The Eye Gang (2018; 2025)
- Kumar Kanchan Ghosh as Harshvardhan from Home Ministry (2024)
- Parth Samthaan as ACP Ayushmaan (2025). He was initially seen in the episode "Purze". He was last seen in the episode "Accident or Murder"
- Aarushi Thakkar as Neena (2025)
- Jaideep Ahlawat as Rajan Aulakh (2025)
- Kunal Kapoor as Vikram Patel (2025)
- Anil Chaudhary (umpire) as a member of the Golden Eye Gang (2025)
- Sanjay Narvekar as Superintendent Omkar Sawant (2025). He was initially seen in the episode "Omkar Sawant Joins The Team". He is nicknamed "SOS". He is last seen in the episode " Double Agent Daya "
- Aniruddh Roy as Chessmaster (2025)
- Lakshya Handa as Dhruv (2025)

=== CID: Special Bureau cast (2004–2006) ===
- Anup Soni as ACP Ajatshatru
- Salil Ankola as Sr. Inspector Akshay
- Nimai Bali as Sr. Inspector Pratap
- Hrishikesh Pandey as Inspector Abhimanyu
- Sushmita Daan as Inspector Jasmine Prakash
- Manasi Varma as Inspector Tejali Krutia
- Sharad Kelkar as Inspector Jehan
- Mahi as Inspector Gargi
- Mugdha Godbole as Inspector Akanksha
- Amita Chandekar as Inspector Ashwini
- Sachin Sharma as Inspector Samar
- Kushal Punjabi as Inspector Kushal
- Ravindra Mankani as Dr. Bharadwaj
- Shweta Kawatra as Dr. Niyati Pradhan
- Dilip Joshi as Bob
- unknown as Ishika, A.C.P. Ajatshatru's adopted daughter
- Yash Tonk as Billa, Ishika's biological father
- Manav Kaul as Yashwant

=== CID 111 – The Inheritance ===
- Kay Kay Menon as Vinod Sagar
- Rajendranath Zutshi as Johnson
- Avinash Wadhawan as Kishore
- Kruttika Desai as Ketki
- Mukesh Rawal as Vishwanath
- Kunal Tavri as Kapil
- Seema Pandey as Sharmila
- Swati Anand as Susheela
- Sharmilee Raj as Reena
- Swati Mitra as Loveleen
- Jaydutt Vyas as Bhargav
- Shahid Khan as Raghu
- Tirthesh Thakkar
- Mayur Bhavsar
- Akshay Dhond child artist
- Rohit tailor in various roles.

== Episodes ==
Series	Episodes	Originally released	
Series	Episodes	First released	Last released
1	1,547	21 January 1998	27 October 2018
2	104	21 December 2024	14 December 2025

=== CID Special Bureau ===
CID Special Bureau is an Indian Hindi spinoff series of CID created by Fireworks Productions for Sony TV. The series premiered on Monday, 3 January 2005, and ended on Thursday, 2 March 2006, with 168 episodes. The series first aired on Monday and Tuesday nights, split each case into two episodes.Three cases of the series:"Bullet .11mm","Mad Bomber" and "Anokha Intequam" had crossover episodes with CID.From 29 August 2005, the series aired 4 days a week on Monday to Thursday nights with each case split across four episodes. The running time of the series was 20–22 minutes. A repeat telecast of the series aired on 6 March 2006 and ended on 27 April 2006.

Episode	Title	Original release date
1	"The Case of Missing Heroine (Part - 1)"	3 January 2005
2	"The Case of Missing Heroine (Concluding part)"	4 January 2005
3	"The Case of Lost Memory (Part - 1)"	10 January 2005
4	"The Case of Lost Memory (Concluding part)"	11 January 2005
5	"2015 Bones and More (Part - 1)"	17 January 2005
6	"2015 Bones and More (Concluding part)"	18 January 2005
7	"The Case of the Poisonous Panther (Part - 1)"	24 January 2005
8	"The Case of the Poisonous Panther (Concluding part)"	25 January 2005
9	"Minutes Before Death (Part - 1)"	31 January 2005
10	"Minutes Before Death (Concluding part)"	1 February 2005
11	"Mysterious Letters (Part - 1)"	7 February 2005
12	"Mysterious Letters (Concluding part)"	8 February 2005
13	"Murder At The Lake (Part - 1)"	14 February 2005
14	"Murder At The Lake (Concluding part)"	15 February 2005
15	"Clue In The Ring Finger (Part - 1)"	21 February 2005
16	"Clue In The Ring Finger (Concluding part)"	22 February 2005
17	"Sunday Picnic (Part - 1)"	28 February 2005
18	"Sunday Picnic (Concluding part)"	1 March 2005
19	"Bullet .11mm (Part - 1) ^{^}"	7 March 2005
20	"Bullet .11mm (Concluding part) ^{^}"	8 March 2005
21	"Curse of the Mummy (Part - 1)"	14 March 2005
22	"Curse of the Mummy (Concluding part)"	15 March 2005
23	"Gold Coins in a Skull (Part - 1)"	21 March 2005
24	"Gold Coins in a Skull (Concluding part)"	22 March 2005
25	"Exchange (Part - 1)"	28 March 2005
26	"Exchange (Concluding part)"	29 March 2005
27	"Silent Witness (Part - 1)"	4 April 2005
28	"Silent Witness (Concluding part)"	5 April 2005
29	"Bank Robbery (Part - 1)"	11 April 2005
30	"Bank Robbery (Concluding part)"	12 April 2005
31	"Murder in Trance (Part - 1)"	18 April 2005
32	"Murder in Trance (Concluding part)"	19 April 2005
33	"Drunken Killer (Part - 1)"	25 April 2005
34	"Drunken Killer (Concluding part)"	26 April 2005
35	"The Case of the Strange Skeleton (Part - 1)"	2 May 2005
36	"The Case of the Strange Skeleton (Concluding part)"	3 May 2005
37	"Betrayal (Part - 1)"	9 May 2005
38	"Betrayal (Concluding part)"	10 May 2005
39	"The Case of Party (Part - 1)"	16 May 2005
40	"The Case of Party (Concluding part)"	17 May 2005
41	"The Jinxed Case (Part - 1)"	23 May 2005
42	"The Jinxed Case (Concluding part)"	24 May 2005
43	"Secret of the Coffin (Part - 1)"	30 May 2005
44	"Secret of the Coffin (Concluding part)"	31 May 2005
45	"Bone Marrow (Part - 1)"	6 June 2005
46	"Bone Marrow (Part - 2)"	7 June 2005
47	"Bone Marrow (Part - 3)"	13 June 2005
48	"Bone Marrow (Part - 4)"	14 June 2005
49	"Bone Marrow (Part - 5)"	20 June 2005
50	"Bone Marrow (Part - 6)"	21 June 2005
51	"Mystery of the Black Hole (Part - 1)"	27 June 2005
52	"Mystery of the Black Hole (Part - 2)"	28 June 2005
53	"Mystery of the Black Hole (Part - 3)"	4 July 2005
54	"Mystery of the Black Hole (Part - 4)"	5 July 2005
55	"Mystery of the Black Hole (Part - 5)"	11 July 2005
56	"Mystery of the Black Hole (Part - 6)"	12 July 2005
57	"Mystery of Smiling Cat (Part - 1)"	18 July 2005
58	"Mystery of Smiling Cat (Part - 2)"	19 July 2005
59	"Mystery of Smiling Cat (Part - 3)"	25 July 2005
60	"Mystery of Smiling Cat (Part - 4)"	26 July 2005
61	"The Case of the Surprised Return (Part - 1)"	1 August 2005
62	"The Case of the Surprised Return (Part - 2)"	2 August 2005
63	"The Case of the Surprised Return (Part - 3)"	8 August 2005
64	"The Case of the Surprised Return (Part - 4)"	9 August 2005
65	"Mad Bomber (Part - 2) ^{^}"	15 August 2005
66	"Mad Bomber (Part - 3) ^{^}"	16 August 2005
67	"Bodies in Wax (Part - 1)"	22 August 2005
68	"Bodies in Wax (Part - 2)"	23 August 2005
69	"Strange Revenge (Part - 2) ^{^}"	29 August 2005
70	"Strange Revenge (Part - 3) ^{^}"	30 August 2005
71	"Strange Revenge (Part - 4) ^{^}"	31 August 2005
72	"Strange Revenge (Part - 5) ^{^}"	1 September 2005
73	"Hand in the Fish (Part - 1)"	5 September 2005
74	"Hand in the Fish (Part - 2)"	6 September 2005
75	"Hand in the Fish (Part - 3)"	7 September 2005
76	"Hand in the Fish (Part - 4)"	8 September 2005
77	"Killer in the Lab (Part - 1)"	12 September 2005
78	"Killer in the Lab (Part - 2)"	13 September 2005
79	"Killer in the Lab (Part - 3)"	14 September 2005
80	"Killer in the Lab (Part - 4)"	15 September 2005
81	"Eye Donor (Part - 1)"	19 September 2005
82	"Eye Donor (Part - 2)"	20 September 2005
83	"Eye Donor (Part - 3)"	21 September 2005
84	"Eye Donor (Part - 4)"	22 September 2005
85	"Punarjanam (Part - 1)"	26 September 2005
86	"Punarjanam (Part - 2)"	27 September 2005
87	"Punarjanam (Part - 3)"	28 September 2005
88	"Punarjanam (Part - 4)"	29 September 2005
89	"The Bride Who Wore Black (Part - 1)"	3 October 2005
90	"The Bride Who Wore Black (Part - 2)"	4 October 2005
91	"The Bride Who Wore Black (Part - 3)"	5 October 2005
92	"The Bride Who Wore Black (Part - 4)"	6 October 2005
93	"Million Dollar Jacket (Part - 1)"	10 October 2005
94	"Million Dollar Jacket (Part - 2)"	11 October 2005
95	"Million Dollar Jacket (Part - 3)"	12 October 2005
96	"Million Dollar Jacket (Part - 4)"	13 October 2005
97	"Missing corpse (Part - 1)"	17 October 2005
98	"Missing corpse (Part - 2)"	18 October 2005
99	"Missing corpse (Part - 3)"	19 October 2005
100	"Missing corpse (Part - 4)"	20 October 2005
101	"Hypnotic Trail (Part - 1)"	24 October 2005
102	"Hypnotic Trail (Part - 2)"	25 October 2005
103	"Hypnotic Trail (Part - 3)"	26 October 2005
104	"Hypnotic Trail (Part - 4)"	27 October 2005
105	"The Vanishing Girl (Part - 1)"	31 October 2005
106	"The Vanishing Girl (Part - 2)"	1 November 2005
107	"The Vanishing Girl (Part - 3)"	2 November 2005
108	"The Vanishing Girl (Part - 4)"	3 November 2005
109	"Khel Khel Main (Part - 1)"	7 November 2005
110	"Khel Khel Main (Part - 2)"	8 November 2005
111	"Khel Khel Main (Part - 3)"	9 November 2005
112	"Khel Khel Main (Part - 4)"	10 November 2005
113	"Khooni Mehmaan (Part - 1)"	14 November 2005
114	"Khooni Mehmaan (Part - 2)"	15 November 2005
115	"Khooni Mehmaan (Part - 3)"	16 November 2005
116	"Khooni Mehmaan (Part - 4)"	17 November 2005
117	"Raat 10:30 Ki Local (Part - 1)"	21 November 2005
118	"Raat 10:30 Ki Local (Part - 2)"	22 November 2005
119	"Raat 10:30 Ki Local (Part - 3)"	23 November 2005
120	"Raat 10:30 Ki Local (Part - 4)"	24 November 2005
121	"The Unknown Reporter (Part - 1)"	28 November 2005
122	"The Unknown Reporter (Part - 2)"	29 November 2005
123	"The Unknown Reporter (Part - 3)"	30 November 2005
124	"The Unknown Reporter (Part - 4)"	1 December 2005
125	"Kidnap (Part - 1)"	19 December 2005
126	"Kidnap (Part - 2)"	20 December 2005
127	"Kidnap (Part - 3)"	21 December 2005
128	"Kidnap (Part - 4)"	22 December 2005
129	"The Unclaimed Body (Part - 1)"	26 December 2005
130	"The Unclaimed Body (Part - 2)"	27 December 2005
131	"The Unclaimed Body (Part - 3)"	28 December 2005
132	"The Unclaimed Body (Part - 4)"	29 December 2005
133	"Terror (Part - 1)"	2 January 2006
134	"Terror (Part - 2)"	3 January 2006
135	"Terror (Part - 3)"	4 January 2006
136	"Terror (Part - 4)"	5 January 2006
137	"The Invisible Killer (Part - 1)"	9 January 2006
138	"The Invisible Killer (Part - 2)"	10 January 2006
139	"The Invisible Killer (Part - 3)"	11 January 2006
140	"The Invisible Killer (Part - 4)"	12 January 2006
141	"Jaws of Death (Part - 1)"	16 January 2006
142	"Jaws of Death (Part - 2)"	17 January 2006
143	"Jaws of Death (Part - 3)"	18 January 2006
144	"Jaws of Death (Part - 4)"	19 January 2006
145	"Beautiful is Ugly (Part - 1)"	23 January 2006
146	"Beautiful is Ugly (Part - 2)"	24 January 2006
147	"Beautiful is Ugly (Part - 3)"	25 January 2006
148	"Beautiful is Ugly (Part - 4)"	26 January 2006
149	"Aatank (Part - 1)"	30 January 2006
150	"Aatank (Part - 2)"	31 January 2006
151	"Aatank (Part - 3)"	1 February 2006
152	"Aatank (Part - 4)"	2 February 2006
153	"Shoes Trail (Part - 1)"	6 February 2006
154	"Shoes Trail (Part - 2)"	7 February 2006
155	"Shoes Trail (Part - 3)"	8 February 2006
156	"Shoes Trail (Part - 4)"	9 February 2006
157	"Saazish (Part - 1)"	13 February 2006
158	"Saazish (Part - 2)"	14 February 2006
159	"Saazish (Part - 3)"	15 February 2006
160	"Saazish (Part - 4)"	16 February 2006
161	"Double Suicide (Part - 1)"	20 February 2006
162	"Double Suicide (Part - 2)"	21 February 2006
163	"Double Suicide (Part - 3)"	22 February 2006
164	"Double Suicide (Part - 4)"	23 February 2006
165	"Swimmer (Part - 1)"	27 February 2006
166	"Swimmer (Part - 2)"	28 February 2006
167	"Swimmer (Part - 3)"	1 March 2006
168	"Swimmer (Part - 4)"	2 March 2006

^{^} Denotes crossover with CID

=== CID Chhote Heroes ===
CID Chhote Heroes is another Indian Hindi sub-series of CID created by Fireworks Productions for Sony TV. The series premiered on Friday, 1 February 2013 and ended on Friday, 24 May 2013, with a total of 17 episodes. The series was aired on every Friday nights, with each case being shown in a single episode. Two cases of the series "Daya in Danger" and "Little Comedian Kidnapped" had crossover episodes with CID. The running time of the series was 44–49 minutes.

Episode	Title	Original release date
1	"Little Fans of CID"	1 February 2013
Five kids in the Suryakiran Apartments play the role of their favourite CID characters in order to find their lost cat Sweety. However, their adventure is cut short as one of them named Micky stumbles upon the dead body of Jay.
2	"Devil Robbers"	8 February 2013
While a young girl waits for her friend, Happy, who has entered the departmental store to come out, she sees a gang of thieves with masked faces enter and take over the store, holding those inside hostage.
3	"The Secret of Rebirth"	15 February 2013
The CID team finds a skeleton chained to a big rock in the water. They come over to Namitha's house to ask why her and Baljeet's relationship broke.
4	"Bus Hijack"	22 February 2013
Freddie takes all of the children in his colony on a summer camp. On the way to the summer camp, the driver stops the bus because the road will be blocked with barricades. Freddie and the driver get off the bus to check and a man comes from behind and holds Freddie at gun point while a few other armed men enter the bus.
5	"The Case of the Mark"	1 March 2013
Kunal witnesses two robbers escaping from the society with a bag and a bloody knife. CID arrive to investigate the robbery and find out that a second robbery has taken place in the society, along with a murder.
6	"Brave Kid"	8 March 2013
Dhruv who was upset with his exam result. He gets lost on his way to school and while finding his way back, he sees a man exhausted from running and helps him. He gets himself in deep trouble by helping the stranger.
7	"Heroine in Danger"	15 March 2013
Tinu, who works with a tea seller, is a huge fan of Bindiya, an actress. But, Bindiya dislikes acting and is only doing it because her stepmother pressurises her. Tinu goes to the C.I.D s bureau to tell them about the imminent threat to Bindiya s life, as he fears that she may be kidnapped.
8	"Neighbor in Danger"	22 March 2013
Micky sees a woman locked in a room, as another woman drives off in a silver-coloured car. Meanwhile, the CIDs find a dying man who has been on the road. With the help of Dhenchu, the CIDs find the man s killer.
9	"The Mystery of the Tifin Box"	29 March 2013
A school teacher has been poisoned, and the CID team investigate. The man was poisoned while having food from a pupil, Guddu s lunchbox. Guddu is missing, and his friends tell the CID's that they had offered Guddu s lunchbox to the sir, without Guddu's permission.
10	"Kidnap in the Airport"	5 April 2013
Airport managers find a child, Tanya, who is lost and weeping miserably. On checking her boarding-pass they find that she has come from Mumbai to Delhi. They decide to send Tanya back to Mumbai with an air hostess to hand her over to her parents. On reaching Mumbai, Tanya goes missing again from the wash room.
11	"Daya in Danger"	12 April 2013
Ravi, a former offender, tries to kill Daya by dropping a huge concrete slab on Daya s car, but he escapes in the nick of time. Then, Daya remembers a drawing that he had got with the morning newspaper, that depicts the scene exactly.
12	"Innocent Killer"	19 April 2013
From the Autopsy, the doctor finds a piece of betel nut from Aakash's body. Taking this as a cue and with clever investigation the CID team finds the tool, which was used to murder Aakash.
13	"Murder in a Car Race"	26 April 2013
A young man dies in a mysterious go-karting accident, witnessed by his own friends & a few youn boys. However, one of the boys claim that it may not have been an accident but murder, as a few days ago all of them had almost been killed in another car accident.
14	"Little Comedian Kidnapped"	3 May 2013
Rajat learns that Roma had undergone a failed kidney transplant, and Daya and the others go their separate ways searching for the hospital where Roma had undergone the surgery for the transplant. Later, the CIDs learn that Rajat s vehicle has met with an accident, and Rajat is missing.
15	"The Secret of Absconding Girls"	10 May 2013
Damini is assumed to have eloped with a stranger. Damini's neighbour, Sunita, too is missing and is assumed to have eloped with another boy. Later, Damini's younger sister identifies a dead body as Sunita.
16	"The Secret of Treasure Hunt"	17 May 2013
Tourists, Randeep and Savita, take their daughter, Tanya, on a tour of an island. However, Randeep is forced to call the CID team when he finds his daughter missing. The CID, on their investigation, find that Tanya was involved in a treasure hunt.
17	"Code of Remote"	24 May 2013
As the CID team investigates a kidnapping case, Ajit, the director of a bio plant company whose daughter, Poonam, was kidnapped, receives a call from the culprit who asks him to produce the remote that controls the cooling plant as a ransom for Poonam. However, upon handing over the remote, he learns that Poonam has been relocated and poisoned. Ajit is then told that unless he produces the code to activate the remote within three hours, she will not be given the antidote to the poison and will be left to die.

^{^} Denotes crossover with CID

== Production ==
=== Development ===
CID was created by producer B. P. Singh, who co-produced it with Pradeep Uppoor under Fireworks Production. Singh in an interview, said, "The premise was simple: Seven cops and one dead body. All our episodes are based around this fact." The second season of the show is produced by Deepak Dhar, Rajesh Chadhaa, Akshay Singh and B. P. Singh under Banijay Asia.

=== Filming ===
2010 cast of CID from an excerpt of an episode. L-R: Jasveer Kaur, Shraddha Musale, Dinesh Phadnis, Shivaji Satam, Vaishnavi Dhanraj, Narendra Gupta, Vivek Mashru, Maninee De, Hrishikesh Pandey, Dayanand Shetty and Aditya Srivastava.

CID is primarily shot in Mumbai, Maharashtra, India. During the long course of the show, the series has been shot in various locations all over India. Other locations include — Delhi, Ahmedabad, Agra, Mathura, Rishikesh, Haridwar, Kullu, Manali, Matheran, Satara, Kolkata and Mahabaleshwar among others. CID has also been shot in foreign countries. Some locations outside India include places like Uzbekistan, London, Paris and Switzerland, which included tourist attractions like Interlaken as well as cities such as Bern and Zürich. A major Paris–Switzerland shoot was done for a 2 hour special episode "Aakhri Chunauti", and a part of the production team's 13th anniversary celebration plan.

==== CID 111 – The Inheritance ====
CID got into both the Limca Book of Records and the Guinness Book of World Records on 7 November 2004 for its record-breaking single shot episode of 111 minutes (1 hour and 51 minutes), entitled "The Inheritance" without a cut which writer – director – producer B. P. Singh feels "every Indian should be proud of because no one has achieved this before".

=== Broadcast ===
The first season of CID was broadcast on Sony Entertainment Television, through its run and now the second season. The series is also aired on Sony Max, ever since it went off air. Currently, the series re-airs on Sony Pal, Sony Wah, Sony Max, Sony Aath (with Bengali dubbing) and Sony Marathi (with Marathi dubbing).

=== Cancellation ===
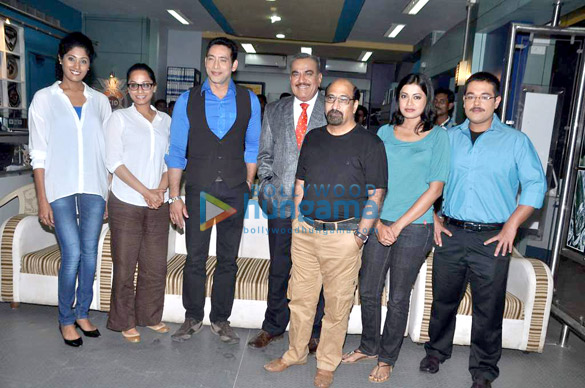
The cast of CID during the shoot

The show was decided to end suddenly by the channel and on 27 October 2018, the last episode was aired. Rumours of the show getting cancelled was going rounds while the official statement by the channel stated the show will go off air for three months to give the producers enough time to reboot it. Further it was reported that "CID is not wrapping up. But it is going on a short break and that's only for a creative reason. The makers haven't received any closure letter from the channel that proves that they are still in contract with them. The break has been decided mutually by the makers and channel as they want to reboot the show." But no announcement of it returning was made since then. Actor Dayanand Shetty who played Daya quoted that the show would not return after this break saying, "No, I don't think it's coming back. I doubt it's coming back. There can't be a break. It's just a convenient way of killing the show."

=== Revival ===
On 24 October 2024, a teaser was released showcasing the return of the show on Sony TV, with a second season. The teaser revealed Shivaji Satam, Dayanand Shetty and Aditya Srivastava reprising their roles as ACP Pradyuman, Senior Inspector Daya and Senior Inspector Abhijeet respectively.

The second season started airing on 21 December 2024 and launched on Netflix as well on 21 February 2025.

The second season aired its final episode on 14 December 2025.

== Other initiatives ==
On 7 July 2006, a nationwide talent hunt by Sony India. called Operation Talaash was launched in search of a new officer to join the CID team. This concluded on 1 September 2006, with Vivek V. Mashru being chosen to play Sub-Inspector Vivek. Sony Entertainment Television had launched CID: Gallantry Awards, an initiative to encourage and honour acts of bravery in society on 26 January 2010 Republic Day. The second edition of this initiative was aired on 23 January 2011. The third and fourth editions were aired on 1 April 2012 and 14 April 2013 respectively. On 10 July 2015; Sony TV announced the Shaatir Lekhak Contest, in which 3 incomplete stories and clues were presented. Contestants were required to complete any one story out of three. The contest ended on 26 July 2015. The winning story appeared in episodes and prizes were also given to the winner. From the total entries, 3 winners were selected, one for each story. The result for the winners were declared during one of the episodes of CID prior to 1 September 2015.

== Crossovers ==
CID had three crossover episodes with the series Aahat, once on 13–14 November 2009, second time on 12–13 February 2010, and third time on 25–26 June 2010. It also had crossover episodes with Adaalat, once on 3–4 December 2010; second time on 14–15 July 2012 titled CID Viruddh Adaalat and third time on 20 December 2014 titled CID V/S Adaalat – Karmyudh. Also, it had a crossover with Taarak Mehta Ka Ooltah Chashmah titled Mahasangam, it started and ended in July 2014.. CID Team has also appeared in episode 23 of Kaun Banega Crorepati Season 8 which aired on 24 September 2014.

== Reception ==
=== Critical response ===
Rediff.com gave the series 4.5 / 5 stars, and stated, "Much of the credit for CID's success should go to Singh, and its cast, especially Shivaji Satam who plays ACP Pradyuman". It stated, "Its actors, or at least the core of the cast who have been a part of the series since its inception are so popular they have become household names." Rahul Hegde of Rediff giving the same ratings stated, "The crime detective series is still going strong". The Times of India stated, "CID which has constantly entertained its viewers with unique and challenging cases is also known for its different jokes in the world of internet." Kristina Das of India Today in a retrospective review in 2020, wrote, "The show had a cult following, even the non-viewers had shown interests. Except for logic, the show had everything, literally. The concept of the show was different, a tad bit too different, you may say. But at times, the makers dragged the episodes with unnecessarily lengthy dialogues when there was no content available."

=== Ratings ===
==== Season 1 ====
Throughout its run, first season of CID was one of the most viewed series on Indian television. The series had an average TRP rating of 3 to 3.5 for several years.

==== Season 2 ====
Unlike first season, the second season of the show received lukewarm responses and had an average TRP rating of 0.8 which is low as compared to the predecessor. However, Season 2 got huge response from audience on Netflix, Sony LIV and also remained in the top ten TV shows of Netflix. It also became top rated scripted show.

== Accolades ==
Indian Telly Awards
Year	Awards	Category	Nominee	Ref
2002	Indian Telly Awards	Best Continuing TV Programme	Fireworks Production	
2002	Indian Telly Awards	Best Actor in a lead role	Shivaji Satam	
2003	Indian Telly Awards	Best Actor in a lead role	Shivaji Satam	
2004	Indian Telly Awards	Best Director	B. P. Singh	
2004	Indian Telly Awards	Best Thriller Programme	B. P. Singh, Pradeep Uppoor (Fireworks Production)	
2006	Indian Telly Awards	Best Weekly Serial	B. P. Singh, Pradeep Uppoor (Fireworks Production)	
2007	Indian Telly Awards	Best Thriller Programme	B. P. Singh, Pradeep Uppoor (Fireworks Production)	
2009	Indian Telly Awards	Best Weekly Serial	B. P. Singh, Pradeep Uppoor (Fireworks Production)	
2010	Indian Telly Awards	Best Thriller Programme	B. P. Singh, Pradeep Uppoor (Fireworks Production)	
2012	Indian Telly Awards	Best Thriller Programme	B. P. Singh, Pradeep Uppoor (Fireworks Production)	
2013	Indian Telly Awards	Best Weekly Serial	B. P. Singh, Pradeep Uppoor (Fireworks Production)	
2015	Indian Telly Awards	Best Weekender Show	B. P. Singh, Pradeep Uppoor (Fireworks Production)	

Indian Television Academy Awards
Year	Awards	Category	Nominee	Ref
2002	Indian Television Academy Awards	Best Drama	B. P. Singh, Pradeep Uppoor (Fireworks Production)	
2004	Indian Television Academy Awards	Best Teleplay	Rajat Arora	
2004	Indian Television Academy Awards	Best Videography	B. P. Singh	
2004	Indian Television Academy Awards	Best Director	B. P. Singh	
2004	Indian Television Academy Awards	Best Thriller / Horror Serial	B. P. Singh, Pradeep Uppoor (Fireworks Production)	
2004	Indian Television Academy Awards	Best Drama	B. P. Singh, Pradeep Uppoor (Fireworks Production)	
2005	Indian Television Academy Awards	Best Actor in a Negative Role	Makrand Deshpande	
2009	Indian Television Academy Awards	Best Thriller / Horror Serial	B. P. Singh, Pradeep Uppoor (Fireworks Production)	
2010	Indian Television Academy Awards	Milestone Award	B. P. Singh, Pradeep Uppoor (Fireworks Production)	
2010	Indian Television Academy Awards	Best Thriller / Horror Serial	B. P. Singh, Pradeep Uppoor (Fireworks Production)	
2015	Indian Television Academy Awards	Best Thriller / Horror Serial	B. P. Singh, Pradeep Uppoor (Fireworks Production)	
2025	Indian Television Academy Awards	ITA Scroll of Honour	Shivaji Satam	

e4m Prime Time Awards
Year	Awards	Category	Nominee	Ref
2025	e4m Prime Time Awards	Best Relaunch Of Program	Banijay Asia	

RAPA Awards
Year	Awards	Category	Nominee	Ref
2025	Radio And TV Professionals Association Trust Awards	Best Director	Santosh Shetty, Sachindra Vats	
2025	Radio And TV Professionals Association Trust Awards	Best Serial	Banijay Asia	

== Other media ==
=== Spin-offs ===
A spin-off CID – Special Bureau, a series about the special branch of CID which deals with cases that were left unsolved for many years aired from 2004-2006.

Another spin-off, CID – Chhote Heroes in which kids solve crimes with the help of CID aired in 2013.

A Bengali-language adaptation of CID known as C.I.D. Kolkata Bureau aired on Sony Aath from 2012-2014.

An animated series titled CID Squad based on the characters of CID began airing on Sony YAY! from 17 March 2025.

=== Mobile games ===
CID - The Game, a mobile video game developed by Vroovy (a joint venture of Hungama and Gameshastra) was developed as a tie-in to the TV series.

CID Heroes - Super Agent Run, a running mobile video game has been released by Zapak and features the characters of Abhijeet, Daya and Pradyuman.

== Impact and legacy ==
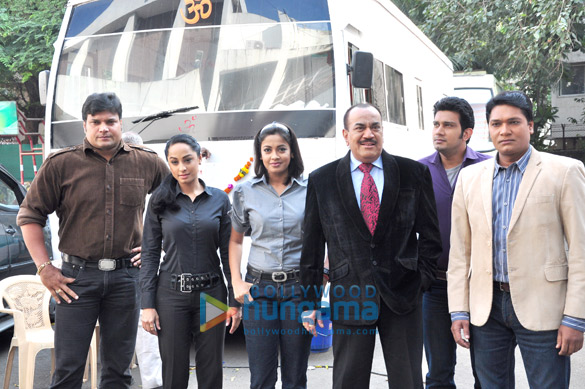
(From L-R) Dayanand Shetty, Ansha Sayed, Janvi Chheda, Shivaji Satam, Vineet Kumar Chaudhary and Aditya Srivastava, the cast of CID.

CID has gained a cult status and following among the audience, owing to its episodes, cast, characters, comedy and story. CID entered in both Guinness World Records and Limca Book of Records, for shooting uncut for 111 minutes for the episode named "The Inheritance", in October 2004. Singer Lata Mangeshkar admitted to being a fan of the series.

Abhishek Raghunath of Forbes India noted: "Millions of Indians wait for CID to play out on their TV screens three nights a week on Sony. The characters—ACP Pradyuman, Sr. Inspectors Abhijeet and Daya, forensic expert Dr Salunkhe, and a host of others—have attained cult status. In an age obsessed with sex, the show is entirely devoid of it and there is no melodrama, a staple of successful Indian soaps since 1999." Rhea Candy from Film Companion stated the chemistry of the cast members and it being a family show, the main reason behind CID's success. She added, "Today, the show incites mixed reactions. There is an acknowledgement of the institution it is; of the actors, directors and writers it has nurtured, and the efforts it has poured into churning out consistent entertainment. There are also unabashed memes inspired by CID's peculiarities."

== See also ==
- List of programs broadcast by Sony Entertainment Television
- Midsomer Murders – A British series featuring UK CID
