= Abhay Shukla =

Indian actor

- Born: 22 September; Prayagraj, Uttar Pradesh, India
- Occupation: Actor
- Years active: 2007–present
- Known for: C.I.D.

Abhay Shukla is an Indian actor known for his role as Inspector Nikhil in the TV series CID

== Early life ==
Abhay Shukla hails from Prayagraj.

== Filmography ==
- 2010 - Knock Out
- 2014 - Holiday: A Soldier Is Never Off Duty
- TBA - Deendayal Ek Yugpurush

== Television ==
- 2007 - Santaan
- 2009 - Shubh Kadam
- 2010 - C.I.D. - "Once Upon A Time In Kolkata" as Ishaan (Episode 641)
- 2010 - C.I.D. - "Bhutiya Ladki Ka Raaz" as Shopkeeper (Episode 655)
- 2011 - C.I.D. - "Abhijeet Ke Ateet Ka Raaz : Part 9" & "Part 10" as Abhay (Episode 691 & Episode 692)
- 2011-2016 - C.I.D. as Inspector Nikhil (from Episode 739 to 1348)
- 2019 - CIF as Inspector Sushant Sharma
- 2019 - Savdhaan India
