= B. P. Singh =

Indian television producer and director (1948/1949–2026)

Brijendrapal Singh
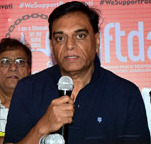
- Singh in 2018
- Born: 27 April 1949; Dehradun, United Provinces, India
- Died: 27 October 2026 (aged 77); Mumbai, Maharashtra, India
- Occupations: Film director and producer, actor
- Years active: 1973–2026
- Known for: C.I.D. Aahat; SuperCops Vs Super Villains

Chairman of the Film and Television Institute of India
- In office 13 December 2018 – 29 September 2020
- Preceded by: Anupam Kher
- Succeeded by: Shekhar Kapur

Brijendrapal Singh (27 April 1949 – 27 October 2026), better known as B. P. Singh, was an Indian television producer. He was the creator and director-producer of the Indian TV series CID (1998–2018; 2024–2025), one of the longest-running television series in India, which started the CID Gallantry Awards in 2010. Singh also played an occasional role of D.C.P. Shamsher Singh Chitrole in C.I.D..

Singh produced Sony TV's horror series Aahat (1995–2015).

On 8 October 2004, a special episode, "The Inheritance" / C.I.D. 111, to mark the completion of six years of CID, was shot in a single continuous shot for 111 minutes (one hour and 51 minutes), which landed the show in the Limca Book of Records and Guinness World Record for "TV show - longest continual shot". He has also served as the Chairman of Film and Television Institute of India (FTII).

== Early life and career ==
Singh was born in Dehradun, India, and studied at Film and Television Institute of India, Pune. He started his career working with state TV-channel Doordarshan in 1973 as a news cameraman and went on to handle the camera for another 10 years, before relocating to Mumbai. He made murder mystery TV film for Doordarshan, Sirf Char Din, while preparing for that film, he started visiting the Crime Branch of police, and befriended Inspector Jayant Wagle, and in the process developed a lifelong interest in detective work. In that film Nana Patekar, Dilip Kulkarni, Manorama Wagle, Jhanvi and Kalpita Malpathak(Rajopadhye) had acted. He subsequently produced the marathi TV series, Ek Shunya Shunya for Doordarshan in 1980's, before relocating to Mumbai where he made a few Marathi serials for Doordarshan.

The horror series Aahat was first shot in 1994 as a suspense thriller, and it started being aired in 1995, but after about 40 episodes with the same theme, one episode on supernatural theme was made and when TRPs of the series rose sharply, it made the switch.

The turning point in his career came with beginning of Sony TV channel, and the shooting of C.I.D., in 1998, about a team of detectives working for the Crime Investigation Department (CID) in Mumbai and is still on. He even introduced India's first silent comedy Gutur Gu in 2010.

He also started crime show on Life OK named Hum Ne Li Hai - Shapath which is about police inspectors and a social worker. This show was gaining good TRPs and was B. P. Singh's second crime show.

== Personal life and death ==
Singh was married to a Canadian, Renu Brijendra Singh also known as Renu B.P. Singh.

Singh's elder son, Salil Singh, died on October 25, 2017, from a massive heart attack while shooting on the set of Savdhaan India in Mumbai.

On 27 October 2026, Singh died from a heart attack in his sleep, whilst at home in Mumbai. He was pronounced dead at Kokilabhen Hospital. Singh was 77.

== Filmography ==
=== Films ===
Year	Title	Role
2012	Agent Vinod	RAW Chief Hasan Nawaz
N/A	Sirf Char Din	Director

=== Web series ===
Year	Title	Notes
2019–2022	Abhay	Producer

=== Television ===
Year	Show	Role
1988	Ek Shunya Shunya	Producer
1998–2018	C.I.D.	D.I.G. / D.C.P. Shamsher Singh Chitrole/Director/Producer
1995–2015	Aahat	Director/Producer
2004–2006	CID: Special Bureau	Producer
2002	Achanak 37 Saal Baad	Director/Producer
2004	Raat Hone Ko Hai	Director/Producer
2008	Zindagi Badal Sakta Hai Haadsa	Director
2010–2014	Gutur Gu	Producer
2011	Surya The Super Cop	Producer
2012	Adaalat	D.C.P. Shamsher Singh (Chitrole) in C.I.D
2012–2017	SuperCops Vs Super Villains	Director/Producer/Creator
2019–2020	Divya Drishti	Producer

== See also ==
- CID (Indian TV series)
