= Ansha Sayed =

Indian television actress

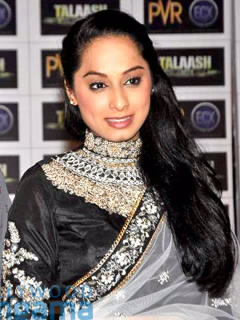
- Sayed in 2012
- Born: Bandra, Mumbai, Maharashtra
- Occupation: Actress
- Years active: 2005–present
- Known for: C.I.D.

Ansha Sayed is an Indian actress. She is best known for portraying Sub-Inspector Purvi in C.I.D. Her other notable roles include Leelavati on Laagi Tujhse Lagan, Jenny in Rang Badalti Odhani.

== Early life ==
Sayed grew up in Bandra, Mumbai. She is an alumna of M. M. K. College in Bandra. Originally, she wanted to be a journalist, but ended up as an actress after successful auditions. Sayed began her acting career with Aahat.

== Filmography ==
=== Films ===
Key
†	Denotes films that have not yet been released

Year	Title	Role	Language	Notes	Ref.
2019	Hu Narendra Modi Banva Mangu Chu	Shanti	Gujarati		
2023	Yaan Superstar	Ananya	Tulu		
2024	Ghudchadi	Sneh Sharma	Hindi		

=== Television ===
Year	Title	Role	Notes	Ref.
2005	Aahat	Unknown		
2006–2007	Kyaa Hoga Nimmo Kaa	Riti Sehgal		
2006–2008, 2011–2018; 2024–2025	CID	Various characters including Inspector Purvi		
2007	Doli Saja Ke	Namrata Veer Kapoor		
2008–2009	Bandhan Saat Janamon Ka	Nikita Gupta		
2008–2009	Aye Dil-E-Nadaan	Sonakshi		
2009–2010	Kesariya Balam Aavo Hamare Des	Dhumri		
2010	Yahan Main Ghar Ghar Kheli	Kanika Prakash		
2010–2011	Laagi Tujhse Lagan	Leelavati "Leela"		
2011	Rang Badalti Odhani	Jenny		
2019	CIF	Sub-Inspector Meenakshi		
2020	RadhaKrishn	Shikhandini		
2021	Kaamnaa	Sangini Holkar		
2021	Savdhaan India	Inspector Deepti Singh		
2021	Mauka-E-Vardaat	Inspector Anwesha Purohit		
2023–2024	Shiv Shakti – Tap Tyaag Tandav	Vajrangi		
2024	Shrimad Ramayan	Tataka		

=== Web series ===
Year	Title	Role	Notes	Ref.
2020	Paper	Tejaswini Rathod		
2022	Maharani	Sanjana Dutt	Season 2	
2022	Human	Shalini		
