= Farida Jalal =

Indian actress (born 1950)

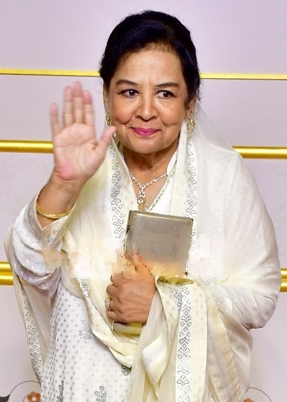
- Jalal at the 2024 premiere of Heeramandi
- Pronunciation: [fəɾiːd̪ɑː d͡ʒəlɑːl]
- Born: Farida Sami; 18 May 1950 (age 76); Bombay, Bombay State, India
- Occupation: Actress
- Years active: 1967–present
- Spouse: Tabrez Barmavar (m. 1978; died 2003)
- Children: 1

Farida Jalal (Hindustani pronunciation: [fəɾiːd̪ɑː d͡ʒəlɑːl]; born Farida Sami; 18 May 1950) is an Indian actress who has primarily worked in Hindi films. In a film career spanning almost sixty years, Jalal appeared in over 200 films. Best known for her character-driven roles in independent cinema and supporting work in mainstream Bollywood productions, Jalal has received such accolades as four Filmfare Awards and two Bengal Film Journalists Association Awards.

Jalal started her career with Taqdeer (1967). She went on to play leading and supporting roles in numerous motion pictures through the 1970s and early 80s. She is widely remembered for her roles in Aradhana (1969), Paras (1971), Henna (1991) and Dilwale Dulhania Le Jayenge (1995), the last three of which garnered the Filmfare Award for Best Supporting Actress. She became a household name after portraying motherly roles and strong female characters in the 1990s and the early 2000s. She has also won the Filmfare Award for Best Actress (Critics) for her role in Mammo (1994). She won the Best Actress Award at the 2012 Harlem International Film Festival for her role in A Gran Plan (2012).

She has also worked in numerous shows on Indian television alongside her work in films. Some of her notable works are the sitcom Yeh Jo Hai Zindagi, Dekh Bhai Dekh, and Shararat. Lately she even ventured into webseries and shortfilms like Love Shots where she was paired opposite her counterpart and co-star Kulbhushan Kharbanda with whom she shared a great chemistry since years and they both received applauds for their role as well which brought them back on screens in a new look after a long hiatus.

== Career ==
Farida Jalal, who was born on 18 May 1950 in Bombay, started her career in the 1960s when she won the United Film Producers Talent Hunt sponsored by Filmfare in 1965. She, along with Rajesh Khanna was chosen as a finalist and both were presented on stage as winners at the Filmfare Awards function. She got her first film offer for Taqdeer from Tarachand Barjatya who happened to be in the audience. In an interview in 2014, she said, when asked her about the initial part of her career: "I started my acting career when I was just out of my school St Joseph's Convent in Panchgani, in a film called Taqdeer. I took part in a talent contest and even won. Kaka (Rajesh Khanna) and I were the finalists. How was I to know that I'd soon be doing a film Aradhana with him?".

She usually played the sister or rejected fiancée of the male lead. When asked as to how she started getting typecast as a hero's sister, she quoted in an interview: "It all started with Gopi where I was offered the greatest Mr Dilip Kumar's sister's role. Forget about refusing, I jumped at the offer. Even if I had the chance to just go and observe him on the set I'd have done it. I love the man. I remember during those days each and every actor was copying Dilip Saab whether it was Dharmendra, Jeetendra, or Manoj Kumar. I was much in demand as Dilip Saab's sister. Every hero wanted the same. Every actor wanted me to play his sister. Sometimes the sister was the film's heroine. The official heroine would just sing her songs, whereas I had all the dramatic scenes. I got my recognition and the awards. In a film called Paras I was Sanjeev Kumar's sister. But I had a lot more to do than Raakhee-di who played the heroine. I got my first award for it. Then I got my second award for Majboor, a film written by Salimbhai and Javedbhai where Bachchan Saab played my brother. It was so heartening. Why would I want to be heroine when I was getting the stronger parts as the sister?"

During the 1990s, Jalal had a part in many major films, among them Raja Hindustani, Dil To Pagal Hai, Kuch Kuch Hota Hai, Kaho Naa... Pyaar Hai, Kabhi Khushi Kabhie Gham and Dilwale Dulhania Le Jayenge, for which she won the Filmfare Award for Best Supporting Actress in 1996. Farida Jalal played the lead in the film Mammo. The film won the National Film Award for Best Feature Film in Hindi, and Jalal won the Filmfare Award for Best Actress (Critics). She acted in many television serials, such as the sitcom Dekh Bhai Dekh.

In 2003, Jalal starred in Shararat, in which she played a leading role. In 2005, she co-hosted the 50th Filmfare Awards alongside Saif Ali Khan and Sonali Bendre, in Mumbai. In 2008, she made a special appearance in the Punjabi film Yaariyan. Later, she appeared in the soap opera Balika Vadhu.

== Personal life ==
Jalal was married to actor Tabrez Barmavar, who hailed from Bhatkal, Karnataka. She met her husband on the sets of Jeevan Rekha and fell in love in the course of the film and got married in November 1978. The couple moved to Bangalore where her husband had a soap factory business. They have a son named Yaseen. Her husband died in September 2003.

In 2017, she was the victim of a death hoax. There were several fake reports on various websites about her death.

== Filmography ==
Key
| † | Denotes films that have not yet been released |

=== Film ===
| Year | Title | Role | Notes |
|---|---|---|---|
| 1967 | Taqdeer | Geeta | |
| 1968 | Baharon ki Manzil | | |
| 1969 | Mahal | | |
| 1969 | Aradhana | Renu | Nominated—Filmfare Award for Best Supporting Actress |
| 1970 | Puraskar | Reshma | |
| 1970 | Naya Raasta | Radha Pratap Singh | |
| 1970 | Gopi | Nandini | |
| 1970 | Devi | Shobha | |
| 1971 | Paras | Bela Singh | |
| 1971 | Khoj | Asha | |
| 1971 | Amar Prem | Mrs. Nandkishore Sharma | |
| 1971 | Pyar Ki Kahani | Lata | |
| 1972 | Zindagi Zindagi | Shyama | |
| 1972 | Rivaaj | | |
| 1972 | Buniyaad | | |
| 1973 | Heera | Lahariya | |
| 1973 | Bobby | Alka Sharma 'Nikki' | |
| 1973 | Achanak | Nurse Radha | |
| 1973 | Raja Rani | Anita | Uncredited |
| 1973 | Loafer | Roopa | |
| 1974 | Naya Din Nai Raat | | |
| 1974 | Jeevan Rekha | | |
| 1974 | Majboor | Renu Khanna | |
| 1974 | Uljhan | Kamla | |
| 1974 | Sankalp | Geeta Sehgal | |
| 1975 | Khushboo | Kusum's friend | |
| 1975 | Kala Sona | Bela | |
| 1975 | Do Jasoos | Hema Khushalchand | |
| 1975 | Dhoti Lota Aur Chowpatty | Rajni | |
| 1975 | Dharmatma | Mona | |
| 1975 | Aakraman | Asha | |
| 1976 | Shaque | Mrs. Subramaniam | |
| 1976 | Sabse Bada Rupaiya | Bindiya/Shobha | |
| 1976 | Koi Jeeta Koi Haara | | |
| 1976 | Bandalbaaz | Malti | |
| 1977 | Kasam Khoon Ki | Ganga | |
| 1977 | Alaap | Sulakshana Gupta | |
| 1977 | Abhi To Jee Lein | The Nun | |
| 1977 | Aakhri Goli | | |
| 1977 | Shatranj Ke Khiladi | Nafisa | |
| 1977 | Palkon Ki Chhaon Mein | Chhutki | |
| 1978 | Naya Daur | Jenny | |
| 1978 | Ganga Ki Saugand | Champa | Guest appearance |
| 1979 | Jurmana | Laila | |
| 1979 | Dhongee | Geeta Khanna | |
| 1980 | Patthar Se Takkar | | |
| 1980 | Chambal Ki Kasam | | |
| 1980 | Veergati | Parvati Godbole - Mr. Godbole's wife , Sandhya 's mother and Ajay's adoptive mother | |
| 1980 | Abdullah | Yashoda | Uncredited |
| 1981 | Jwala Daku | Sita | |
| 1981 | Yaarana | Mary | Uncredited |
| 1983 | Salam e Mohabbat | | |
| 1987 | Pushpaka Vimana | Magician's wife | Silent Kannada film |
| 1991 | Henna | Bibi Gul | |
| 1992 | Paayal | Shanti Devi | |
| 1992 | Bekhudi | Aunty | |
| 1992 | Bandhu | Mausi | |
| 1992 | Dil Aashna Hai | Razia | |
| 1993 | Gardish | Lakshmi (Shiva's mother) | |
| 1994 | Mammo | Mehmooda Begum Anwar Ali "Mammo" | |
| 1994 | Laadla | Gayetri Verma | |
| 1994 | Krantiveer | Mrs. Tilak (Pratap's Mother) | |
| 1994 | Elaan | Revati Chaudhry | |
| 1994 | Dulaara | Florence | |
| 1995 | Andolan | | |
| 1995 | Jawab | | |
| 1995 | Veergati | Parvati | |
| 1995 | Dilwale Dulhania Le Jayenge | Lajwanti "Lajjo" Singh | |
| 1996 | Shastra | | |
| 1996 | Rajkumar | Panna | |
| 1996 | Loafer | Janki Kumar | |
| 1996 | Dushman Duniya Ka | Manager of women's shelter | |
| 1996 | Raja Hindustani | Chachi | |
| 1996 | Angaara | Saraswati | |
| 1996 | Ajay | Ajay's Mother | |
| 1997 | Saat Rang Ke Sapne | Yashoda | |
| 1997 | Mrityudaata | Mother Ghayal | |
| 1997 | Mohabbat | Geeta Kapoor | |
| 1997 | Judaai | Kajal's mom | |
| 1997 | Zor | | |
| 1997 | Lahoo Ke Do Rang | Halima | |
| 1997 | Ziddi | Jaya's mother | |
| 1997 | Dil To Pagal Hai | Ajay's mom | |
| 1997 | Aflatoon | Raja's mother | |
| 1998 | Salaakhen | Vishal's mother | |
| 1998 | Duplicate | Mrs. Chaudhary "Bebe" | |
| 1998 | Jab Pyaar Kisise Hota Hai | Komal's mother | |
| 1998 | Soldier | Shanti Sinha | |
| 1998 | Kuch Kuch Hota Hai | Mrs. Khanna | |
| 1999 | Dil Kya Kare | Nandita's aunt | |
| 1999 | Hindustan Ki Kasam | Ajay and Tauheed's mother | |
| 1999 | Khoobsurat | Sudha Chaudhary | |
| 2000 | Kaho Naa... Pyaar Hai | Lily | |
| 2000 | Hey Ram | Kasturba Gandhi | Simultaneously made in Tamil and Hindi |
| 2000 | Dulhan Hum Le Jayenge | Mrs. Oberoi | |
| 2000 | Pukar | Gayetri Rajvansh | |
| 2000 | Khauff | Mrs. Jaidev Singh | |
| 2000 | Kya Kehna | Rohini Baxi | |
| 2000 | Bichhoo | Jeeva's mom | |
| 2000 | Tera Jadoo Chal Gayaa | Pooja's mother | |
| 2000 | Gaja Gamini | Noorbibi | |
| 2001 | Farz | Rukmani Singh | |
| 2001 | Zubeidaa | Mammo | |
| 2001 | Chori Chori Chupke Chupke | Asha Malhotra | |
| 2001 | Lajja | Mother of Bride | |
| 2001 | Moksha: Salvation | Salim's mother | |
| 2001 | Kabhi Khushi Kabhie Gham | Sayeeda/Daijan | |
| 2002 | Pyaar Diwana Hota Hai | Mrs. Chaudhary | |
| 2002 | The Legend of Bhagat Singh | Vidyavati | |
| 2002 | Badhaai Ho Badhaai | Mrs. Chaddha | |
| 2002 | Kuch Tum Kaho Kuch Hum Kahein | Mangala Vishnupratap Singh | |
| 2002 | Deewangee | Mrs. Goyal | |
| 2003 | Pinjar | Mrs. Shyamlal | |
| 2003 | Aapko Pehle Bhi Kahin Dekha Hai | Jiji | |
| 2003 | Kaise Kahoon Ke... Pyaar Hai | Lakshmi | |
| 2003 | Main Prem Ki Diwani Hoon | Mrs. Kapoor | |
| 2003 | Jaal: The Trap | Sudha Kaul | |
| 2003 | Fun 2shh: Dudes In the 10th Century | Mrs. DiSouza/Hiraka | Double role |
| 2004 | Garv: Pride and Honour | Mrs. Shakuntala Dixit | |
| 2004 | Taarzan: The Wonder Car | Mrs. Chaudhary | |
| 2005 | Pyaar Mein Twist | Ms. Arya | |
| 2005 | Barsaat | Anushka Sanghi | |
| 2006 | Aryan | Mrs. Braganza | |
| 2007 | Big Brother | Sita devi | |
| 2007 | Laaga Chunari Mein Daag | | |
| 2010 | Krantiveer – The Revolution | | |
| 2010 | Aashayein | Madhu | |
| 2011 | Love Breakups Zindagi | Beeji | |
| 2011 | Chala Mussaddi... Office Office | Shanti | Special appearance |
| 2012 | Chaar Din Ki Chandni | Pammi Kaur | |
| 2012 | Student of the Year | Abhimanyu's grandmother | |
| 2012 | A Gran Plan | Satvinder Kaur Bedi | Harlem International Film Festival Award for Best Actress |
| 2015 | Bezubaan Ishq | Savitri | |
| 2015 | Tina Ki Chaabi | | |
| 2015 | An Untold Story of a Known Irony | | Short film |
| 2017 | I'm Not A Terrorist | Zabira | Malaysian film |
| 2018 | Batti Gul Meter Chalu | Lalita's Grandmother | |
| 2020 | Jawaani Jaaneman | Jazz's Mother | |
| 2021 | Lines | Dadi | |
| 2025 | Aabeer Gulaal | Nani | |
| 2025 | Love in Vietnam | Bebbe | |
| 2025 | The Great Shamsuddin Family | Akko | JioHotstar film |
| 2026 | O'Romeo | Daadi | |
| 2026 | Welcome to the Jungle | Badi Bi | |
| 2021 | Pashmina | Directed by Danish Renzu | To be released where she is paired with Kulbhushan Kharbanda and Aditi Rao etc. |
| TBA | Karmaa Meets Kismet † | TBA | |

=== Television ===
| Year | Series | Role | Notes |
|---|---|---|---|
| 1984 | Yeh Jo Hai Zindagi | Ranjit's aunt | |
| 1993–1994 | Dekh Bhai Dekh | Suhasini | |
| 1993–1998 | Junoon | Ganga | |
| 1994 | The Great Maratha | Chimnabai | |
| 1995–1996 | Beauty Parlour | | |
| 1997–1999 | Star Yaar Kalakaar | Host | |
| 1997–1998 | Daal Mein Kala | | |
| 1998 | Is Duniya Ke Sitare | Host | |
| 1999 | Aashiqui | Shobha | |
| 2003–2006 | Shararat | Sushma Mehra | |
| 2005 | Hero - Bhakti Hi Shakti Hai | Bebe | Guest |
| 2009–2012 | Balika Vadhu | Badi Masiji | |
| 2010 | Rishta.com | Ruchika's mother | Guest |
| 2011 | Dolly Aunty Ka Dream Villa | Dolly Aunty | |
| 2011 | Ammaji Ki Galli | Ammaji | |
| 2013 | Jeannie Aur Juju | Duggu Dadi | |
| 2014–2016 | Satrangi Sasural | Gomti Devi Vatsal | |
| 2024 | Heeramandi | Qudsia Begum | |

=== Web ===
| Year | Title | Role | Notes |
|---|---|---|---|
| 2016 | Love Shots | Mrs. Chaudhary | Episode 4 |
| 2019 | Mehram | Muslim woman | Short film |
| 2019 | Parchhayee | Ricky's Dadi | |

== Awards and nominations ==
| Year | Award | Nominated work | Category | Result | Ref. |
Major awards
| 1971 | Bengal Film Journalists' Association Awards | Paras | Best Supporting Actress (Hindi) | Won | |
| 1996 | Bengal Film Journalists' Association Awards | Mammo | Best Actress (Hindi) | Won | |
| 1970 | Filmfare Awards | Aradhana | Best Supporting Actress | Nominated | |
| 1972 | Filmfare Awards | Paras | Best Supporting Actress | Won | |
| 1976 | Filmfare Awards | Majboor | Best Supporting Actress | Nominated | |
| 1978 | Filmfare Awards | Shaque | Best Supporting Actress | Nominated | |
| 1980 | Filmfare Awards | Jurmana | Best Supporting Actress | Nominated | |
| 1992 | Filmfare Awards | Henna | Best Supporting Actress | Won | |
| 1995 | Filmfare Awards | Mammo | Best Actress (Critics) | Won | |
| 1996 | Filmfare Awards | Dilwale Dulhania Le Jayenge | Best Supporting Actress | Won | |
| 2003 | Indian Television Academy Awards | Shararat | Best Actress (Popular) | Nominated | |
| 2003 | Indian Television Academy Awards | Shararat | Best Actress – Comedy | Won | |
| 2004 | Indian Telly Awards | Shararat | Best Actress in a Comic Role | Nominated | |
| 2007 | Indian Telly Awards | Shararat | Best Actress in a Comic Role | Nominated | |
| 1998 | Zee Cine Awards | Dil To Pagal Hai | Best Actress in a Supporting Role | Nominated | |
| 1999 | Zee Cine Awards | Jab Pyaar Kisise Hota Hai | Best Actress in a Supporting Role | Nominated | |
Other awards
| 2012 | Harlem International Film Festival | A Gran Plan | Best Actress | Won | |
| 2015 | Los Angeles Indian Film Festival | An Untold Story of a Known Irony | Best Actress | Won | |
