= Indian Television Academy Awards =

Annual awards for achievements in Hindi-language television

- Awarded for: Excellence in Hindi Entertainment
- Country: India
- Presented by: Indian Television Academy
- First award: 2001; 25 years ago
- Website: Indian Television Academy

Television/radio coverage
- Network: Star Plus; Hotstar; Sony TV; Zee TV; Colors TV

The Indian Television Academy Awards, also known as the ITA Awards, is an annual award ceremony organised by the Indian Television Academy to honour performances and excellence in Hindi-language television, films as well as web content.

== History ==
The Indian Television Academy was launched in July 2001 by Anu Ranjan and the first ITA Awards were held in November 2001.

== Trophy ==
The trophy for the Indian Television Academy Awards is a golden statuette shaped like a stylized human figure with raised hands holding a blue square shield.

The ITA Trophy

== Editions ==
Year	Ceremony	Channel	Host	Ref
2001	1st ITA Awards	Star Plus	Kabir Bedi	
2002	2nd ITA Awards			
2003	3rd ITA Awards			
2004	4th ITA Awards			
2005	5th ITA Awards		Smriti Irani; Ronit Roy	
2006	6th ITA Awards		Roshan Abbas; Manini De	
2007	7th ITA Awards	Star Plus		
2008	8th ITA Awards			
2009	9th ITA Awards			
2010	10th ITA Awards			
2011	11th ITA Awards		Gautam Rode; Karishma Tanna	
2012	12th ITA Awards	Star Plus	Karan Grover	
2013	13th ITA Awards		Kapil Sharma; Ragini Khanna; Karan Grover	
2014	14th ITA Awards	Colors TV	Rithvik Dhanjani; Nakuul Mehta	
2015	15th ITA Awards		Manish Paul; Bharti Singh	
2016	16th ITA Awards	Colors TV	Manish Paul; Sugandha Mishra; Karishma Tanna	
2017	17th ITA Awards	Colors TV	Manish Paul; Ali Asgar	
2018	18th ITA Awards	Star Plus	Manish Paul	
2019	19th ITA Awards	Sony TV	Aditya Narayan	
2020	20th ITA Awards	Held in 2021 due to COVID-19 pandemic		
2021	20th ITA Awards	Star Plus	Manish Paul	
2022	21st ITA Awards	Star Plus	Rithvik Dhanjani	
2022	22nd ITA Awards	Star Plus	Manish Paul	
2023	23rd ITA Awards	Star Plus	Nakuul Mehta; Paritosh Tripathi	
2024	24th ITA Awards	Star Plus	Gaurav Khanna	
2025	25th ITA Awards	Star Plus	Manish Paul	

== Categories ==
=== Popular awards ===
==== Drama ====
- ITA Award for Best Actor Drama Popular
- ITA Award for Best Actress Drama Popular
- ITA Award for Best Drama Popular

==== Comedy ====
- ITA Award for Best Actor Comedy Popular
- ITA Award for Best Actress Comedy Popular
- ITA Award for Best Show Comedy Popular

==== OTT Awards ====
- ITA Award for Best Actor OTT Popular
- ITA Award for Best Actress OTT Popular
- ITA Award for Best Program OTT Popular

=== Jury awards ===
==== Drama ====
- ITA Award for Best Actor Drama Jury
- ITA Award for Best Actress Drama Jury
- ITA Award for Best Drama Jury
- ITA Award for Best Director Drama
- ITA Award for Best Actor in a Supporting Role
- ITA Award for Best Actress in a Supporting Role
- ITA Award for Best Actor in a Negative Role
- ITA Award for Best Actress in a Negative Role
- ITA Award for Best Child Artist

==== Comedy ====
- ITA Award for Best Actor Comedy Jury
- ITA Award for Best Actress Comedy Jury
- ITA Award for Best Director Comedy Jury
- ITA Award for Best Show Comedy Jury

== Channel awards ==
=== Best Entertainment Channel ===
- 2001 - DD Metro
- 2002 - Star Plus
- 2003 - Star Plus
- 2004 - Star Plus
- 2005 - Star Plus
- 2006 - Star Plus
- 2007 - Star Plus
- 2008 - Star Plus
- 2009 - Colors TV
- 2010 - Star Plus
- 2011 - Star Plus
- 2012 - Star Plus
- 2013 - Star Plus
- 2014 - Star Plus
- 2015 - Star Plus
- 2016 - Star Plus
- 2017 - Star Plus
- 2018 - Colors TV
- 2019 - Star Plus
- 2020 - Star Plus

=== Best Hindi News Channel ===
- 2001 - Aaj Tak
- 2002 - Aaj Tak
- 2003 - Aaj Tak
- 2004 - Aaj Tak
- 2005 - Aaj Tak
- 2006 - Aaj Tak
- 2007 - Aaj Tak
- 2008 - Aaj Tak
- 2009 - Aaj Tak
- 2010 - Aaj Tak
- 2011 - Aaj Tak
- 2012 - Aaj Tak
- 2013 - Aaj Tak
- 2014 - Aaj Tak
- 2015 - Aaj Tak
- 2016 - India TV
- 2017 - Aaj Tak
- 2018 - Aaj Tak
- 2019 - Aaj Tak
- 2020 - Aaj Tak
- 2021 - ABP News
- 2022 - ABP News
- 2023 - Aaj Tak
- 2024 - Aaj Tak
- 2025 - Aaj Tak

=== Best English News Channel ===
- 2006 - CNN-News18
- 2007 - CNN-News18
- 2008 - CNN-News18
- 2009 - NDTV 24x7
- 2010 - CNN-News18
- 2011 - CNN-News18
- 2012 - CNN-News18
- 2013 - CNN-News18
- 2014 - Times Now
- 2015 - CNN-News18
- 2016 - CNN-News18
- 2017 - India Today
- 2018 - India Today
- 2019 - India Today
- 2020 - India Today
- 2021 - India Today
- 2022 - India Today
- 2023 - India Today
- 2024 - India Today
- 2025 - India Today

=== Best Reality Show ===
Year	Show	Channel
1999	Mickers	Colors TV
2006	Shabaash India	Zee TV
2007	Bigg Boss	Sony TV
2008	Fear Factor: Khatron Ke Khiladi	Colors TV
2009	Aap Ki Kachehri	Star Plus
2010	Stunt Mania	
2011	Just dance	Star Plus
2012	Survivor India – The Ultimate Battle	Star Plus
2013	DID Supermoms	Zee TV
2014	Fear Factor: Khatron Ke Khiladi 5	Colors TV
2015	Bigg Boss 8	Colors TV
2016	Dance Plus (season 2)	Star Plus
2017	Fear Factor: Khatron Ke Khiladi 8	Colors TV
2020	Fear Factor: Khatron Ke Khiladi – Made in India	Colors TV

=== Best Anchor: Music/Film Based Show ===
Year	Actor	Show	Channel
2003	Nikhil Chinappa; Annu Kapoor & Pallavi Joshi	MTV Fresh! Antakshari – The Great Challenge	MTV India; Zee TV
2004	Sajid Khan	Ikke Pe Ikka	Zee TV
2005	Sajid Khan	Sab Kuch Ho Sakta Hai	SAB TV
2006	Sangeeta Ghosh & Shabbir Ahluwalia	Nach Baliye	Star One
2007	Javed Jaffrey & Naved Jaffrey	Boogie Woogie	Sony TV
2008	Ali Asgar (actor)	Say Shava Shava	NDTV Imagine
2009	Meiyang Chang	Indian Idol 4	Sony TV
2010	Shahid Kapoor	Screen Awards	Star Plus
2011	Ayushmann Khurana	Just Dance	Star Plus
2012	Manish Paul	Jhalak Dikhhla Jaa	Colors TV
2013	Beverly Kim White	Thank God It's Friday	
2014	Manish Paul	Jhalak Dikhhla Jaa	Colors TV
2015	Manish Paul	Jhalak Dikhhla Jaa	Colors TV
2020	Shahid Kapoor	Star Screen Awards	Star Plus

=== Best Music/Film Based Show ===
Year	Show
2001	Biographies - Ek Kalakar Ki Kahani
2002	Kuch Yaadein Kuch Baatein
2003	Antakshari
2004	Ikke Pe Ikka
2005	Indian Idol
2006	Nach Baliye
2007	Sa Re Ga Ma Pa Challenge
2008	Boogie-woogie
2009	Indian Idol 4
2010	Indian Idol 5
2011	Sa Re Ga Ma Pa Li'l Champs
2012	Dance India Dance Li'l Masters 2
2013	An Affair To Remember — Shyam Talkies
2014	Jhalak Dikhhla Jaa
2015	
2016	The Voice India Kids
2017	Sa Re Ga Ma Pa Li'l Champs
2020	Indian Idol 12

=== Best Talk Show Anchor ===
Year	Actor	Show
2003	Simi Garewal	Rendezvous with Simi Garewal
2004	Barkha Dutt	We the People
2005	Prabhu Chawla	Seedhi Baat
2006	Lola Kutty; Barkha Dutt	Lola TV; We the People
2007	Karan Johar	Koffee with Karan
2008	Vikram Chandra	The Big Fight
2009	Rajdeep Sardesai; Kiran Bedi	Battle For India; Aap Ki Kachehri
2010	Amitabh Bachchan	Bigg Boss 3
2011	Koel Purie	On the Couch with Koel
2012	Sumeet Raghavan	Jay Hind!
2020	Amitabh Bachchan	Kaun Banega Crorepati

=== Best Game Show Host ===
Year	Anchor	Show	Channel
2001	Amitabh Bachchan	Kaun Banega Crorepati	Star Plus
2002	Naseeruddin Shah	Super Selector	
2003	Derek O'Brien	Bournvita Quiz Contest	
2004	Annu Kapoor	Sansui Antakshri	
2005	Amitabh Bachchan	Kaun Banega Crorepati	Star Plus
2006	Amitabh Bachchan	Kaun Banega Crorepati	Star Plus
2007	Arshad Warsi	Bigg Boss 1	
2008	Shahrukh Khan	Kya Aap Paanchvi Pass Se Tez Hain?	
2009	Salman Khan	10 Ka Dum	Sony TV
2010	Rajeev Khandelwal	Sacch Ka Saamna	
2011	Amitabh Bachchan	Kaun Banega Crorepati	Sony TV
2012	Rajiv Makhni	Tech Grand Masters 2	
2013	Chef Kunal Kapur	Junior Masterchef India	Star Plus
2020	Salman Khan	Bigg Boss 13	Colors TV

=== Best Game Show ===
Year	Show	Channel
2001	Cadbury Sabse International Khiladi Kaun?	Sony SET
2002	Super Selector	ESPN (India)
2003	Bournvita Quiz Contest	Zee TV
2020	Bigg Boss 13	Colors TV

=== Best News Anchor ===
Year	Anchor	Show	Channel
2001	Rajat Sharma	Aap Ki Adalat	Zee TV
2002	Barkha Dutt	Reality Bites	NDTV
2003	Rajdeep Sardesai	The Big Fight	NDTV
2004	Rajdeep Sardesai	X-Factor/Election Watch	NDTV
2005	Barkha Dutt	We the People	NDTV 24x7
2006	Sreenivasan Jain	Witness	NDTV
2007	Cyrus Broacha	The Week That Wasn't	CNN-News18
2008	Rajdeep Sardesai	Weekend Edition with Rajdeep Sardesai	CNN-News18
2009	Prabhu Chawla	Seedhi Baat	Aaj Tak
2010	Rajdeep Sardesai	Ground Zero Bhopal	CNN-News18
2011	Rajdeep Sardesai	Indian at 9 & Election Counting Day Coverage	CNN-News18
2012	Rajdeep Sardesai	Ground Zero	CNN-News18
2013	Rahul Kanwal	Centrestage - Inside Lanka's museum of horrors	
2014	Anjana Om Kashyap	Rail Budget	Aaj Tak
2015	Kalli Purie		India Today
2016	Rahul Kanwal & Anjana Om Kashyap		India Today & Aaj Tak
2017	Rajdeep Sardesai	5 state Polls Day verdict	CNN-News18
2018	Anjana Om Kashyap		Aaj Tak
2020	Rahul Kanwal		India Today
2021	Kevin Peterson		National Geographic Channel
2022	Aman Chopra & Shobhna Yadav		CNN-News18 & ABP News
2023	Rahul Kanwal & Navika Kumar		India Today & Times Now Navbharat
2024	Navika Kumar (Talk/Chat Show in English), Rahul Kanwal (Current affairs in English); Anjana Om Kashyap ( Talk/Chat show In Hindi), Sushant Sinha ( Current affairs in Hindi)		Times Now, India Today; Aaj Tak, Times Now Navbharat
2025	Anjana Om Kashyap (Talk/Chat Show in Hindi), Sweta Singh (Current affairs in Hindi), Gaurav Sawant (Talk/Chat Show in English)		Aaj Tak, Aaj Tak, India Today

=== Best News Show ===
Year	Show	Channel
2020	Viral Punch	ABP News

=== Best Television Event ===
Year	Show	Channel
2001	Zee Cine Awards	Zee Cinema
2003	Jai Jawan	NDTV
2004	Jai Jawan	NDTV
2005	Jai Jawan	NDTV
2006	MTV Immies	MTV
2007	IIFA Awards	Star Plus
2008	IIFA Awards	Star Plus
2009	IIFA Awards	
2010	Not Awarded	
2011	Star Parivaar Awards	Star Plus
2020	Zee Cine Awards	Zee Cinema

=== Best Interstitial/Filler ===
Year	Show	Channel
2013	Gustakhi Maaf; Angry Appa	NDTV; Bindass

=== Best Mini Series ===
Year	Show	Channel
2013	Bemisaal 100 saal	News Nation Network Pvt Ltd

=== Best TV Documentary ===
Year	Show	Channel
2013	Ballot Trail Karanataka…… Mangalore	
2017	JANNAT- NEWS18 INDIA- ASHISH PANDEY	

=== Others ===
- ITA Award for Best Thriller/Horror Serial
- ITA Award for Popular Serial -Special Recognition
- Milestone Achievement Award - Crime Patrol (2021)

== Technical awards ==
=== Best Art Direction ===
Year	Name	Show
2001	Nitin Chandrakant Desai	The Great Warrior Chhatrapati Shivaji
2002	Jayant Deshmukh	Amrapali (DD National)
2003	Chokas Bharadwaj	Kashmeer
2004	Saurabh Tiwari	Kasautii Zindagii Kay
2005	Mukesh Kalola	Hatim
2006	Omung Kumar	Dharti Ka Veer Yodha Prithviraj Chauhan
2007	Saurabh Tiwari	Kasautii Zindagii Kay
2008	Chokas Bharadwaj	Jai Shri Krishna
2009	Nitin Chandrakant Desai	Chittod Ki Rani Padmini Ka Johur
2010	Samir Chanda	Bigg Boss 3
2011	Akshay Vayeda	Mukti Bandhan
2012	Omung Kumar	MasterChef India
2013	Sandesh & Vishwanath	Bharat Ka Veer Putra – Maharana Pratap
2014	Omung Kumar	Jhalak Dikhhla Jaa 7
2015	??	
2016	Omung Kumar	Jhalak Dikhhla Jaa 8
2017	Chandravadan More	Peshwa Bajirao

=== Best Costumes ===
Year	Name	Show
2001	Pradeep Muley	The Great Warrior Chhatrapati Shivaji
2002	Manohar Sawant	Kasautii Zindagii Kay
2003	Manohar Sawant	Kasautii Zindagii Kay
2004	Nikhat Mariyam Neerushaa	Hatim
2005	Nikhat Mariyam Neerushaa	Hatim
2006	Tara Desai, Nisha Sagar, Nikhat Mariyam Neerushaa	Dharti Ka Veer Yodha Prithviraj Chauhan
2007	Sheela Sagar and Nikhat Mariyam Neerushaa	Dharti Ka Veer Yodha Prithviraj Chauhan
2008	Sheela Sagar	Jai Shri Krishna
2009	Neeta Lulla	Chittod Ki Rani Padmini Ka Johur
2010	Winnie Malhotra & Neelu Shroff	Balika Vadhu
2011	Nidhi Yasha	Shobha Somnath Ki
2012	Winnie Malhotra & Neelu Shroff	Balika Vadhu
2013	Nikhat Mariyam Neerushaa	Bharat Ka Veer Putra – Maharana Pratap
2014	Jerry D'souza	Nach Baliye 6
2015		
2016	Nikhat Mariyam Neerushaa	Siya Ke Ram
2017	Nikhat Mariyam Neerushaa	Prem Ya Paheli – Chandrakanta
2018	Ketki Dalal	Porus
2021	Sheetal Sharma	The Empire (TV series)
2023	Tara Desai	Pandya Store

=== Best Dialogues ===
Year	Name	Show
2001	Ashwni Dhir	Office Office
2002	Rekkha Modi	Kasautii Zindagii Kay
2003	Ashwni Dhir	Office Office
2004	Ashwni Dhir	Office Office
2005	Aatish Kapadia	Sarabhai vs Sarabhai
2006	Ashwni Dhir	Naya Office Office
2007	Kamlesh Pandey	Virrudh
2008	Raghuvir Shekhawat	Balika Vadhu
2009	Usha Dixit	Balika Vadhu
2010	Usha Dixit	Balika Vadhu
2011	Mihir Bhuta	Mukti Bandhan
2012	Usha Dixit	Balika Vadhu
2013	Raghuvir Shekhawat	Diya Aur Baati Hum
2014	B. M. Vyas	Bharat Ka Veer Putra – Maharana Pratap
2014	Amit Aaryan	F.I.R.
2016	Manoj Santoshi	Bhabhi Ji Ghar Par Hai!
2017	Manoj Santoshi	Bhabi Ji Ghar Par Hai!
2018	Manoj Santoshi	Jijaji Chhat Per Hain

=== Best Editing ===
Year	Name	Show
2001		IT India Tomorrow
2002	Aparna Roy and Anand Kumar	The Year that Shook the World (International Year ender)
2003	Naved Jaffrey	Boogie Woogie
2004	Papu Trivedi	Hatim
2005	Pratik Chitalia & Raj Singh	Time Bomb
2006	Koteswara Rao	The Last Goodbye-Missing in Action
2007		SPL REPORT - TRAIN TO TIBET
2008	Koteswara Rao	Scaling New Heights
2009	Vikas Singh, Tarique Ahmed & Devang Kakkad	Ladies Special
2010	Sanjeev Naag	Inside: Mumbai Terror Attacks
2011	Paresh Shah	Shobha Somnath Ki
2012	Amit Kalra	Making of Foodistan
2013	K. Rajgopal	Bharat Ka Veer Putra – Maharana Pratap
2014	Bhakti Mayaloo	24
2015		
2016	Bhakti Mayaloo	24
2017	Gaurav Khera	Defender Of India
2023	Janak Chauhan	Pandya Store

=== Edutainment/Science/Knowledge Based Show ===
Year	Name	Show	Channel
2002	Pulse Media	Turning Point	DD National

=== Best TV Picture Editor ===
Year	Name	Show	Channel
2002	Awadh Singh	Kudrat	DD National

=== Best Public Service Shorts ===
Year	Name	Show	Channel
2004	BBC World Services Trust, Naco & Prasar Bharti	HIV/Aids Spots	DD National

=== Best Lyricist ===
Year	Name	Show	Channel
2003	Naksh Lyalpuri	Shikwah	DD National
2005	Nawab Arzoo	Kasautii Zindagii Kay	Star Plus
2013	Vibha Tewari	Madhubala - Ek Ishq Ek Junoon	Colors TV
2014	Abhishek Kumar; Shashank Kunwar	Rangrasiya	Colors TV

=== Best Singer ===
Year	Name	Show	Channel
2004	Shreya Ghoshal	Ye Meri Life Hai	Sony TV
2006	Shreya Ghoshal & Sonu Nigam	Haath Se Haath Mila	DD National
2013	Harshdeep Kaur	Bani - Ishq Da Kalma	Colors TV
2014	Mika Singh	Mission Sapne	Colors TV
2017	Jubin Nautiyal	Tu Sooraj Main Saanjh, Piyaji	Star Plus
2019	Shivangi Bhayana	Kahaan Hum Kahaan Tum	Star Plus
2024	Harshit Saxena	Shrimad Ramayan	Sony TV

==== Best Story ====
Year	Name	Show	Channel
2013		Lapataganj	SAB TV
2014	Purnendu Shekhar; Gajra Kottary	Balika Vadhu	Colors TV
2018		Ishq Subhan Allah	Zee TV

=== Best Teleplay ===
Year	Name	Show	Channel
2004	Rajat Arora	CID	Sony TV
2013	Seema Mantri	Diya Aur Baati Hum	Star Plus
2014	Rensil D'Silva; Bhavani Iyer; Priya Pinto	Yeh Rishta Kya Kehlata Hai	Star Plus
2023	Bhavna Vyas	Anupamaa	Star Plus

=== Best Title Music/Song Track ===
Year	Name	Show	Channel
2002	Lalit Sen	Kasautii Zindagii Kay	Star Plus
2013	Karthik Shah	Bharat Ka Veer Putra –Maharana Pratap	Sony TV
2014	Saurabh Kalsi	Rangrasiya	Colors TV

=== Best Videography ===
Year	Name	Show	Channel
2004	B. P. Singh	CID	Sony TV
2013	Sanjay Agrawal	Everest: Indian Army Women's Expedition	Discovery Channel (India)
2014	Jay Oza; Tanay Satam	24	Colors TV

=== Best Visual Effects ===
Year	Name	Show	Channel
2013	Hardik Gajjar	Devon Ke Dev...Mahadev	Life OK
2014		The Adventures of Hatim; Mahabharat	Life OK; Star Plus
2003	Biju Dhanapalan (Maya Entertainment Ltd)	Son Pari	Star Plus

== Special awards ==
The ITA Honorary Award, is given by the Indian Television Academy as part of its annual ITA Awards. The award is usually given to television series, events or personalities that have acquired legendary status through Indian television.

=== Special awards ===
Year	Award	Recipient	Ref.
2025	Outstanding Contribution to Indian Entertainment	Manoj Bajpayee	
2025	Global Icon of Indian Cinema	Alia Bhatt	
2025	Excellence in Performance (Film & OTT)	Pratik Gandhi	

=== ITA Scroll of Honour ===
Year	Award	Recipient(s)	Ref.
2025	ITA Scroll of Honour	Shatrughan Sinha	
2025	ITA Scroll of Honour	Rakesh Bedi	
2025	ITA Scroll of Honour	Shekhar Suman	
2025	ITA Scroll of Honour	Mandira Bedi	
2025	ITA Scroll of Honour	Javed Jaffrey, Naved Jaffrey & Ravi Behl	
2025	ITA Scroll of Honour	Mukesh Khanna	
2025	ITA Scroll of Honour	Shivaji Satam	
2025	ITA Scroll of Honour	Mona Singh	
2025	ITA Scroll of Honour	Ronit Roy	
2025	ITA Scroll of Honour	Dilip Joshi	
2025	ITA Scroll of Honour	Urvashi Dholakia	

== See also ==
- List of Asian television awards
