= Indian Telly Award for Best Actress in a Comic Role =

Indian Telly Award for Best Actor in a Comic Role – Female
- Description: Best Performance by an Actor in a Comic Role on Television
- Country: India
- Presented by: IndianTelevision.com
- First award: 2002 (for performances in TV shows in 2001)
- Website: Indian Telly Awards

Indian Telly Award for Best Actor in a Comic Role – Female is an award given by IndianTelevision.com as part of its annual Indian Telly Awards for TV serials, to recognize a female actor who has delivered an outstanding performance in a comic role.

The award was first awarded in 2002. Since 2012, the award has been separated in two categories, Jury Award and Popular Award. Jury award is given by the chosen jury of critics assigned to the function while Popular Award is given on the basis of public voting.

== List of winners ==
=== 2002-10 ===
- 2002 Reema Lagoo - Tu Tu Main Main as Devki Verma a.k.a. Saasu Maa
  - Supriya Pilgaonkar - Tu Tu Main Main as Radha Verma
  - Asawari Joshi - Office Office as Usha
  - Seema Kapoor - Hum Saath Aath Hain as Vimmo
  - Shagufta Ali - Tedhe Medhe Sapne
- 2003 Supriya Pathak - Khichdi as Hansa Parekh
  - Asawari Joshi - Office Office as Usha
  - Tanaaz Currim - Meri Biwi Wonderfool as Angela
  - Karishma Tanna - Kyunki Saas Bhi Kabhi Bahu Thi as Indu
  - Delnaaz Paul - Yes Boss as Kavita Verma
  - Sushmita Mukherjee - Ramkhilawan C.M. 'n' Family as Imarti Devi
- 2004 Manini Mishra - Jassi Jaissi Koi Nahin as Pari Kapadia
  - Asawari Joshi - Office Office as Usha
  - Supriya Pathak - Khichdi as Hansa Parekh
  - Vandana Pathak - Khichdi as Jayshree Parekh
  - Farida Jalal - Shararat as Sushma "Nani" Malhotra
- 2005 Supriya Pathak - Instant Khichdi as Hansa Parekh
  - Vandana Pathak - Instant Khichdi as Jayshree Parekh
  - Ratna Pathak Shah - Sarabhai vs Sarabhai as Maya Sarabhai
  - Rupali Ganguly - Sarabhai vs Sarabhai as Monisha Sarabhai
  - Sushmita Mukherjee - Kkavyanjali as Romila
- 2006 Suchita Trivedi - Baa Bahoo Aur Baby as Meenakshi Thakkar
  - Shweta Kawatra - Sohni Mahiwal as Soni
  - Ratna Pathak Shah - Sarabhai vs Sarabhai as Maya Sarabhai
  - Divya Dutta - Shanno Ki Shaadi as Shanno
  - Rajeshwari Sachdev - Ji Behenji as Behenji
- 2007 Snehal Sahay - Banoo Main Teri Dulhann as Shalu
  - Farida Jalal - Shararat as Sushma "Nani" Malhotra
  - Shweta Kawatra - Sohni Mahiwal as Soni
  - Ketki Dave - Kyunki Saas Bhi Kabhi Bahu Thi as Daksha Virani
  - Shagufta Ali - Woh Rehne Waali Mehlon Ki as Phufi
  - Kavita Kaushik - F.I.R as Chandramukhi Chautala
  - Suchita Trivedi - Baa Bahoo Aur Baby as Meenakshi Thakkar
- 2008 Suchita Trivedi - Baa Bahoo Aur Baby as Meenakshi Thakkar
  - Kavita Kaushik - F.I.R as Chandramukhi Chautala
  - Suchita Trivedi - Baa Bahoo Aur Baby as Meenakshi Thakkar
  - Supriya Pathak - Remote Control as Baari Maasi
  - Tasneem Sheikh - Kyunki Saas Bhi Kabhi Bahu Thi as Mohini Harsh Virani
  - Ashita Dhawan - Sapna Babul Ka...Bidaai as Malti Sharma
  - Disha Vakani - Taarak Mehta Ka Ooltah Chashmah as Daya Jethalal Gada
- 2009 Disha Vakani - Taarak Mehta Ka Ooltah Chashmah as Daya Jethalal Gada
  - Suchita Trivedi - Baa Bahoo Aur Baby as Meenakshi Thakkar
  - Kavita Kaushik - F.I.R as Chandramukhi Chautala
  - Juhi Babbar - Ghar Ki Baat Hai as Radhika Yagnik
  - Ashita Dhawan - Sapna Babul Ka...Bidaai as Malti Sharma
- 2010 Disha Vakani - Taarak Mehta Ka Ooltah Chashmah as Daya Jethalal Gada
  - Pushtiie Shakti - Mahi Way as Mahi Talwar
  - Ami Trivedi - Papad Pol as Kokila Parikh
  - Kavita Kaushik - F.I.R as Chandramukhi Chautala
  - Usha Nadkarni - Pavitra Rishta as Savita Deshmukh
  - Apara Mehta - Sajan Re Jhoot Mat Bolo as Damini Devi Diwan

=== 2012-present ===
==== Popular Awards ====
- 2012 Kavita Kaushik - F.I.R as Chandramukhi Chautala
  - Disha Vakani - Taarak Mehta Ka Ooltah Chashmah as Daya Jethalal Gada
  - Vandana Pathak - R. K. Laxman Ki Duniya as Bakula Bhavesh Vasavda
  - Smita Singh - Hitler Didi as Sunaina Sharma
  - Sucheta Khanna - Lapataganj as Indumati Gupta
- 2013 Giaa Manek - Jeannie Aur Juju as Jeannie
  - Kanika Maheshwari - Diya Aur Baati Hum as Meenakshi Vikram Rathi
  - Utkarsha Naik - Iss Pyaar Ko Kya Naam Doon? as Manorama Singh Raizada
  - Disha Vakani - Taarak Mehta Ka Ooltah Chashmah as Daya Jethalal Gada
  - Sucheta Khanna - Lapataganj as Indumati Gupta

==== Jury Awards ====
- 2012 Disha Vakani - Taarak Mehta Ka Ooltah Chashmah as Daya Jethalal Gada
  - Kavita Kaushik - F.I.R as Chandramukhi Chautala
  - Sucheta Khanna - Lapataganj as Indumati Gupta
  - Divyanka Tripathi - Chintu Chinki Aur Ek Badi Si Love Story as Mrs. Rashmi Sharma
  - Shubhangi Gokhale - Lapataganj as Mishri Mausi
- 2013 Disha Vakani - Taarak Mehta Ka Ooltah Chashmah as Daya Jethalal Gada
  - Kanika Maheshwari - Diya Aur Baati Hum as Meenakshi Vikram Rathi
  - Utkarsha Naik - Iss Pyaar Ko Kya Naam Doon? as Manorama Singh Raizada
  - Shubhangi Gokhale - Lapataganj as Mishri Mausi
  - Sucheta Khanna - Lapataganj as Indumati Gupta
