= Maneesh Chhibber =

Indian journalist

- Notable awards: National Law Day Award. 2015; Award for Outstanding Media Persons. 2012; J&K State Awards. 2012; Ramnath Goenka Excellence in Journalism Award. 2009; International Council of Jurists Excellence in Journalism Award. 2025

Maneesh Chhibber is an author and journalist. He has worked for ThePrint, The Tribune, Hindustan Times, The Indian Express, The Wire, and DNA. He was appointed as the editorial head of the short-lived Tiranga TV in 2019.

In 2009, Chhibber won a Ramnath Goenka Excellence in Journalism Award for "Reporting on Politics and Government". Chhibber has also won both the Award for Outstanding Media Persons, and the J&K State Award in 2012. In 2015, Chhibber won the National Law Day award from the International Council of Jurists. In 2025, Chhibber won the Excellence in Journalism award from the International Council of Jurists in Bangkok.
