= ITA Award for Best Director Comedy =

Indian Television Academy award

ITA Award for Best Director - Comedy
- Awarded for: Best Direction in a Comic Television Series
- Country: India
- Presented by: Indian Television Academy
- First award: 2001
- Final award: 2023

Highlights
- Total Awarded: 21
- First Winner: Rajeev Mehta for Office Office (2001)
- Last Winner: Anukalp Gowswami for The Kapil Sharma Show (2023)

ITA Award for Best Director Comedy is an award given by Indian Television Academy as a part of its annual event.

== Winners ==
Year	Director	Show	Channel	Reference
2001	Rajiv Mehra	Office Office	SAB TV	
2002	Rajiv Mehra	Office Office	SAB TV	
2003	Rajiv Mehra	Office Office	SAB TV	
2004	Rajiv Mehra	Office Office	SAB TV	
2005	Deven Bhojani	Sarabhai vs Sarabhai	Star One	
2006	Rajeev Mehra	Naya Office Office	Sony SAB	
2007	Rajeev Mehra	Naya Office Office	Sony SAB	
2008	Samir Kulkarni	Remote Control	9X	
2009	Dharampal Thakur, Nikul Desai & Vipul D Shah	Comedy Circus - Kaante Ki Takkar	Sony TV	
2010	Ashwini Dhir	Lapataganj	Sony SAB	
2011	Dharam Verma	Lapataganj	Sony SAB	
2012	Shashank Bali	F.I.R.	Sony SAB	
2013	Rajan Waghdhare	Jeannie Aur Juju	Sony SAB	
2014	Shashank Bali	F.I.R.	Sony SAB	
2015	No Award given			
2016	Shashank Bali	Bhabi Ji Ghar Par Hai!	&TV	
2017	Shashank Bali	Bhabi Ji Ghar Par Hai!	&TV	
2018	Shashank Bali	Bhabi Ji Ghar Par Hai!	&TV	
2019	Bharat Kukreti	The Kapil Sharma Show	Sony TV	
2020	No Award given			
2021	Bharat Kukreti	The Kapil Sharma Show	Sony TV	
2022	Jamnadas Majethia, Samir Kulkarni	Wagle Ki Duniya – Nayi Peedhi Naye Kissey	Sony SAB	
2023	Anukalp Gowswami	The Kapil Sharma Show	Sony TV	
