= ITA Award for Best Show - Comedy =

Indian Television Academy Award

- Description: Best Show Jury
- Sponsored by: Indian Television Academy
- First award: 2001
- Final award: 2024

Highlights
- Total awarded: 22
- First Winner: Ji Mantriji (2001)
- Last Winner: Bhabi Ji Ghar Par Hai! (2024)
- Website: https://indiantelevisionacademy.com

ITA Award for Best Show - Comedy is an award given by Indian Television Academy as a part of its annual event. The winners are decided by the Jury.

== Winners ==
Year	Show	Production House	Channel	Ref
2001	Ji Mantriji	NDTV with BBC WORLDWIDE	Star Plus	Jury
2002	Office Office	Rajiv Mehra	SAB TV	Jury
2003	Office Office	Rajiv Mehra	SAB TV	Jury
2004	Office Office	Rajiv Mehra	SAB TV	
2005	Sarabhai vs Sarabhai	Jamnadas Majethia	Star One	
2006	Naya Office Office	Rajiv Mehra	Star One	
2007	Naya Office Office	Rajiv Mehra	Star One	
2008	The Week That Wasn't	Pavan Acharya	CNN-IBN	
2009	Taarak Mehta Ka Ooltah Chashmah	Neela Film Productions	SAB TV	
2010	F.I.R.	Edit 2 Productions	SAB TV	
2011	Lapataganj	Ashwni Dhir	SAB TV	
2012	F.I.R.	Edit 2 Productions	SAB TV	
2013	Comedy Nights with Kapil	Kapil Sharma, Preeti Simoes	Colors TV	
2014	Taarak Mehta Ka Ooltah Chashmah	Neela Film Productions	Sony SAB	
2015	Taarak Mehta Ka Ooltah Chashmah	Neela Film Productions	Sony SAB	
2016	Taarak Mehta Ka Ooltah Chashmah	Neela Film Productions	Sony SAB	
2017	Bhabiji Ghar Par Hain!	Edit II Productions	&TV	
2018	Bhabiji Ghar Par Hain!	Edit II Productions	&TV	
2019	The Kapil Sharma Show	Salman Khan Television	Sony Entertainment Television	
2020	Not Awarded			
2021	Bhabiji Ghar Par Hain!	Edit II Productions	&TV	Jury
2021	Wagle Ki Duniya – Nayi Peedhi Naye Kissey	Hats Off Productions Ltd	Sony SAB	
2022	Bhabiji Ghar Par Hain!	Edit II Productions	&TV	Jury
2023	Wagle Ki Duniya – Nayi Peedhi Naye Kissey	Hats Off Productions Ltd	Sony SAB	Jury
2024	Bhabi Ji Ghar Par Hai!	Edit II Productions	& TV	Popular
2024	Wagle Ki Duniya	Hats Off Productions Ltd	Sony SAB	Jury

== See also ==
- ITA Award for Best Show Popular
- ITA Award for Best Actor Popular
- ITA Award for Best Actress Popular
- ITA Award for Best Actor Drama
- ITA Award for Best Actress Drama
