= Chala Mussaddi... Office Office =

- Theatrical release poster
- Directed by: Rajiv Mehra
- Written by: Ashwni Dhir
- Based on: Office Office
- Produced by: Umesh Mehra; Rajesh Mehra; Rajiv Mehra
- Starring: Pankaj Kapur; Deven Bhojani; Sanjay Mishra; Manoj Pahwa; Asawari Joshi; Makrand Deshpande
- Cinematography: Carlton D'Mello
- Edited by: Manish Jaitly
- Music by: Sajid–Wajid
- Distributed by: Eagle Films
- Release date: 5 August 2011
- Running time: 112 minutes
- Country: India
- Language: Hindi
- Budget: ₹6.5 crore
- Box office: ₹1.4 crore

Chala Mussaddi ... Office Office (transl. Mussaddi went... to the office) is a 2011 Indian satirical film based on the television series Office Office, also directed by Rajiv Mehra. Starring Pankaj Kapur, Deven Bhojani, Asawari Joshi, Sanjay Mishra and others, who also featured in the TV sitcom.

== Plot ==
Retired schoolmaster Mussaddi Lal Tripathi, the quintessential "Common Man" troubled by his wife's serious illness, takes her to the hospital, where the utter negligence and vested interests of the doctors result in her untimely death. Mussaddi then, along with his young, unemployed, drifter son, Bunty (Gaurav Kapoor), sets out for his pilgrimage to the four holy sites for the immersion of his wife's ashes. In his absence, pension officers arrive at Mussaddi's house to inquire about his status. Musaddi's neighbour Gupta tells them that Mussaddi has gone far away, and the Pension Officers interpret that Mussaddi Lal has expired and report him dead in their files. When Mussaddi returns, he discovers to his utter shock that he is dead according to government files. He tries his heart out to make the pension office staff believe that he is alive, but they are not convinced at all as they want proper proof.

Mussaddi Lal, bemused and dejected by the irony of the situation, sets out on his mission to gather proof that he is alive, while the Pension Office employees resolve that whatever proof Mussaddi brings, they will not allow him to be officially alive since they have already mopped up his pension money. Mussaddi decides to revolt in his own way and decides to take the law in his hands. Does Mussaddi finally get his justice, or does he remain a dead victim of the bureaucracy? Can Mussaddi overcome the corrupt system and its officials and be triumphant and alive, if so, how?

== Cast ==
- Pankaj Kapur as Mussaddi Lal Tripathi
- Deven Bhojani as Patel
- Manoj Pahwa as Bhatia
- Sanjay Mishra as Shukla
- Hemant Pandey as Pandey Ji
- Asawari Joshi as Ushaji
- Gaurav Kapoor as Bunty Tripathi, Mussaddi's son
- Farida Jalal (in a Cameo) as Shanti Tripathi, Mussaddi's wife
- Makrand Deshpande - Uncredited
- Mahesh Thakur as Subhash the Judge

== Box office ==
The film grossed an estimated ₹1.4 crore (US$150,000) at the box office, against a budget of ₹6.5 crore (US$670,000). and declared as "disaster" on boxofficeindia.
