= Suchita Trivedi =

Indian actress (born 1976)

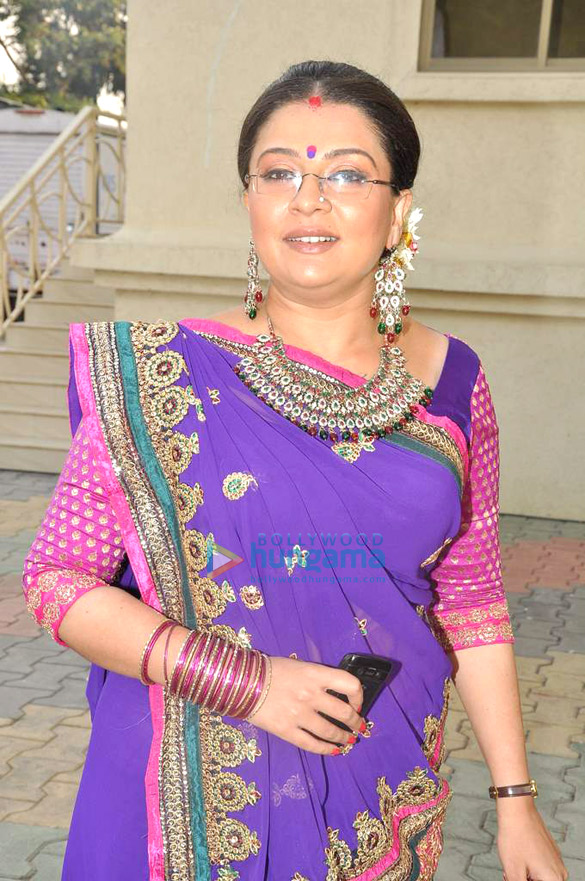
- Trivedi in 2012
- Born: 20 September 1976 (age 50); Mumbai, Maharashtra, India
- Occupation: Actress
- Years active: 1983–present
- Spouse: Nigam Patel (m. 2018)

Suchita Trivedi (born 20 September 1976) is an Indian actress, who is known for her work in Hindi TV dramas. She is widely remembered for her portrayal of Meenakshi Thakkar in the acclaimed dramedy Baa Bahoo Aur Baby on Star Plus, for which she twice won the Indian Telly Award for Best Actress in a Comic Role, and received two further nominations.

== Personal life ==
Suchita was born to parents Anil Trivedi and Geeta Trivedi in Mumbai, Maharashtra, on 20 September 1976. Suchita married Nigam Patel on 22 September 2018, at the age of 42.

She shared her marriage photos on Instagram which become viral.

== Career ==
Trivedi made her acting debut as a child artiste in the short film "Ek Sawaal Munni Ka", written and directed by National Film Award winner Director Balwant Dullat. The short film was telecasted many times on National Television (Door Darshan). She also acted as a child artist in the 1983 Bollywood film Woh Saat Din, starring Anil Kapoor, Naseeruddin Shah, and Padmini Kolhapure in the main roles. Her character was called Chanda.

She has mainly worked in Indian Hindi television. She is best known for portraying the comic character of Meenakshi Thakkar in Hats Off Productions' super-hit TV series Baa Bahoo Aur Baby, aired on Star Plus Hindi channel from 2005 to 2010.

== Filmography ==
=== Films ===
- 1982 - Ek Sawaal Munni Ka (Debut; Child artist)
- 1983 – Woh Saat Din (child artist)
- 1984 - Laila (1984) (Child Artist)
- 1986 - Preeti (1986 film) (Child Artist)
- 1997 – ...Jayate
- 2000 – Mission Kashmir – Dr Akhtar's wife
- 2006 – O Re Manvaa (My Heart)
- 2008 – Firaaq
- 2015 – Kuch Kuch Locha Hai – Kokila Patel
- 2018 – Ventilator – Gujarati film
- 2024 - CTRL - Nella's Mother
- 2024 - The Great Gujarati Matrimony - Gujarati film
- 2025 - Umbarro - Gujarati film
- 2026 - Paatki - Gujarati film

=== Television ===
Year(s)	Show	Role	Notes
1995–1998	Sailaab		
1993–1995	Campus	Priya	
1999	Rishtey		Episode role
1996	Gopaljee	Saraswati	Supporting role
1999–2002	Ek Mahal Ho Sapno Ka	Meenu	Supporting role
2001	Chandan Ka Palna Resham Ki Dori	Binita Bhimani	Supporting role
2003	Khichdi	Mayurakshi ("Maxi")	Guest
2003	Kahaani Ghar Ghar Ki	Shilpa Agarwal	
2005–2010	Baa Bahoo Aur Baby	Meenakshi Thakkar	Lead role Won—Indian Telly Award for Best Actress in a Comic Role (2006, 2008); Nominated—Indian Telly Award for Best Actress in a Comic Role (2007, 2009)
2008	Ek Packet Umeed	Kanchan	Supporting role
2009	Comedy Circus	Nurse Maya Khurgil	
2010–2011	Dil Se Diya Vachan	Sonakshi Krushna Karmakar	Supporting role
2012	Ek Doosre Se Karte Hain Pyaar Hum	Sanyukta Majumdar	Lead role
2013	Savitri	Maharani	Supporting role
2013–2014	Bh Se Bhade	Sushma Bhade	Lead role
2015–2017	Mere Angne Mein	Kaushalya Shrivastav	Supporting role
2018	Ishq Mein Marjawan	Roma Raichand	Supporting role
2019	Tujhse Hai Raabta	Savita Deshpande	Supporting role
2020–2021	Indiawaali Maa	Kaushalya Gadvi/Kaaku	Lead role

=== Stage ===
- 2005 – Ishwar Ni Exchange Offer (Gujarati stage drama)
