= A Gran Plan =

- Theatrical release poster
- Directed by: Sangeeta Nambiar
- Written by: Sangeeta Nambiar
- Produced by: Prema Menon
- Starring: Farida Jalal; Oliver Kennett; Malvika Muralidhar
- Cinematography: Sachin Kabir
- Edited by: Anshul Tewari
- Music by: Kaizad Gherda; Kabir Singh; James Vasanthan
- Production companies: Playacting Productions; Rupture Productions
- Distributed by: Golden Village
- Release dates: October 2012 (Silent River Film Festival); April 25, 2014 (Singapore)
- Running time: 75 minutes
- Country: Singapore
- Language: English

A Gran Plan is a 2012 English-language Singaporean independent drama film written and directed by Sangeeta Nambiar, and produced by Prema Menon under the banner of Playacting Productions. It features veteran Indian actress Farida Jalal in the lead role.

== Plot ==
The story of the film revolves around the lives of two individuals — Satvinder Kaur Bedi, a 68-year-old lady, and Oliver, her 10-year-old young boy neighbor. When they meet, they discover that both of them share some common problems regarding loneliness. Soon, they develop a strange but sensitive relationship which gains momentum over the period of time. The ways in which they overcome several hurdles in the form of age, language and culture, and finally communicate with each other to create an intimate long-lasting companionship forms the climax of the story.

== Cast ==
- Farida Jalal as Satvinder Kaur Bedi
- Oliver Kennett as Oliver
- Malvika Muralidhar as Malvika
- Tania Mukherjee as Pallavi
- Neil Shaabi as Neil
- Pavan J Singh as Hemant
- Pahel Shah as Pooja

== Production ==
A Gran Plan is produced by Prema Menon under the banner of Playacting Productions, a production house based in Singapore. The film is produced by Sangeeta Nambiar. Executive producers include Kimi Shaabi. Except Farida Jalal (who is based in India), almost all the crew members of A Gran Plan are based in Singapore. The entire film is shot in Singapore.

The theatrical trailer of the film was unveiled on September 15, 2012.

== Release ==
A Gran Plan released on April 25, 2014, in Singapore, where the production companies and most of the crew members are based.

=== Festival screenings ===
A Gran Plan was screened at the following film festivals in 2012.

- WorldKids International Film Festival
- LA Femme International Film Festival
- The Rome International Film Festival
- Harlem International Film Festival
- Delhi International Film Festival
- The Indie Film Festival (Award of Merit)
- Silent River Film Festival

== Accolades ==
A Gran Plan was screened at nine film festivals and won the following four awards:

Award	Category	Recipients and nominees	Result
Harlem International Film Festival	Mira Nair Award For Rising Female Filmmaker	Sangeeta Nambiar	Won
Harlem International Film Festival	Best Actress	Farida Jalal	Won
Silent River Film Festival	River Rock Award for Best Child Actor	Oliver Kennett	Won
Delhi International Film Festival	Best NRI Film	Sangeeta Nambiar	Won

== Music ==
A Gran Plan

Soundtrack album by: Kaizad Gherda; Kabir Singh; James Vasanthan
- Released: April 14, 2014
- Genre: Feature film soundtrack
- Length: 1:49

Kaizad Gherda chronology
Sinners: Chapter II - Chana (2012)	A Gran Plan (2014)

James Vasanthan chronology
Vizha (2013)	A Gran Plan (2014)

Music of A Gran Plan has been composed by Kaizad Gherda, Kabir Singh and James Vasanthan. Lyrics are penned by Jaideep Sahni. A promo of the song "Zindagi Sataaegi", sung by renowned singer Shreya Ghoshal, and composed by Kaizad Gherda and Kabir Singh, was released on April 14, 2014.

All lyrics are written by Jaideep Sahni; all music is composed by Kabir Singh and Kaizad Gherda.

A Gran Plan
No.	Title	Singer(s)	Length
1.	"Zindagi Sataaegi"	Shreya Ghoshal	1:49
Total length:			1:49
