= Harlem International Film Festival =

Annual film festival in Harlem, New York, US

- Location: Harlem, New York City, New York
- Founded: 2005
- Festival date: September
- Language: English
- Website: harlemfilmfestival.org

The Harlem International Film Festival (Hi) is an annual five-day film festival in Harlem, New York. The first festival took place in 2005. Michael Franti's I Know I'm Not Alone was named Best International Documentary at the festival that year. The short film Eme Nakia was selected to be screened at the 2006 festival. Also that year, The Hip Hop Project produced by Queen Latifah and Bruce Willis was named Best Documentary Film. Nigerian film Anchor Baby was named Best Film at the 2010 festival and won another award there as well. Omoni Oboli was named Best Actress that year. Najat Jellab's short film The Projectionist premiered at the 2013 festival. The festival named Vanessa L. Williams Best Actress one year. Short film In The Field, directed by Matthew Hope, was screened at the festival one year.

== Harlem International Film Festival 2024 award winners ==
Award	Film	Winner
Best Film	Valley of Exile	
Best World Film	When Morning Comes	
Best Documentary	Return to Your Corner	
Best World Documentary	Three (Extra)Ordinary Women	
Audience Award	One Person, One Vote?	
Best Director	Stakes is High	Jean-Pierre Caner
Best Documentary Director	FIREFLY: The Tay Fisher Story	Christopher Nostrand
Mira Nair Award for Rising Female Filmmaker	Playing Through	Balbinka Korzeniowska
Best Actress	As if it's True	Ashley Ortega
Best Actor	My Last Best Friend	Eric Roberts
New York Vision Award	Skate Night	
Best Short Narrative	I Promise You Paradise	
Best Short Short	Pen, Again	
Best Short Documentary	How to Sue The Klan	
Harlem Spotlight (Feature Narrative)	What Somalia Wants	
Harlem Spotlight (Feature Documentary)	Sing! Fight! Sing! Fight! From Leroi To Amiri	
Harlem Spotlight (Short Narrative)	Speak Up Brotha!	
Harlem Spotlight (Short Documentary)	Interception: Jayne Kennedy • American Sportscaster	
Uptown Award (Narrative)	Bronx Park Thunder	
Uptown Award (Documentary)	The Book of Days	
Best Youth Short (Narrative)	Project: KLB2	Andrew Baker Taylor & Andrew Yuen
Best Youth Short (Doc)	Little Sahara	
Best Animation	A Cow In The Sky	
Best Experimental Film	For Those That Lived There	
Best Music Video	Null Island – Cyano Sun Suite	
Winning Webisode	Vibrations: Offerings	
Best Virtual Reality	Nirwana Gold	
Winning Feature Screenplay	Black Mountain	Joe Villanti
Winning Short Script	Ryan Fenson-Hood	No Rules Radio

== Harlem International Film Festival 2023 award winners ==
Award	Film	Winner
Best Film	Blow Up My Life	
Best World Film	Illyricvm	
Best Documentary	Ricochet	
Best World Documentary	King of Kings	
Audience Award	The Right to Read	
Best Director	Honor Student	Tamika Miller
Best Documentary Director	Blind Eye Artist	Ashwin Chaudhary
Mira Nair Award for Rising Female Filmmaker	Stronghold	Julia Camara
Best Actress	Our Father, the Devil	Babetida Sadjo
Best Actor	Our Father, the Devil	Souleymane Sy Savané
Best Production	The Way to Happiness	
New York Vision Award	Orange and the Blues	
Best Short	A Mukbang to Remember	
Best Short Short	Visiting Day	
Best Short Documentary	John Leguizamo Live at Rikers	
Harlem Spotlight	In Search of Bengali Harlem	
Uptown Award (Feature Film)	In the Weeds	
Uptown Award (Short Film)	The Obituary of Jasper James	
Best Youth Film	The Lake Merritt Monster	
Best Animation	There is Exactly Enough Time	
Best Experimental Film	Harlem is Nowhere	
Best Music Video	Winter in Pluto	
Winning Webisode	Closet B!tch	
Best Virtual Reality	Thank You for Sharing Your World	
Winning Feature Screenplay	A Man Called White	Randy Hines
Winning Short Script	1918	Jenna Brister

== Harlem International Film Festival 2022 award winners ==
Award	Film	Winner
Best Film	Never Better	
Best World Film	The Ugly Truth	
Best Documentary	Stateless	
Best World Documentary	Girls for Future	
Audience Award	Love is in the Legend	
Best Director	Maya and Her Lover	Nicole Sylvester
Best Documentary Director	Ushiku	Thomas Ash
Mira Nair Award for Rising Female Filmmaker	Blurring the Color Line	Crystal Kwok
Best Actress	Never Better	Sofia Bryant
Best Actor	Broken Blooms	Jeric Gonzales
Best Production	Person Woman Man Camera TV	
New York Vision Award	Leveling Lincoln	
Best Short	Black Rainbow	
Best Short Short	Wildcat	
Best Short Documentary	When I Get Grown – Reflections of a Freedom Rider	
Harlem Spotlight	Cinema and Sanctuary – Hans Richter & America's First Documentary Film School	
Uptown Award (Feature Film)	My Mother's Son	
Uptown Award (Short Film)	If My Voice Rang Louder Than My Skin	
Best Youth Film	En Avant	
Best Animation	Peek-a-Boom	
Best Experimental Film	Black Love Manifesto	
Best Music Video	Enough	
Winning Webisode	Lost/Found	
Best Virtual Reality	Stories of Home	
Winning Feature Screenplay	A Black Tribute and a Red Scare	
Winning Short Script	My Town	

== Harlem International Film Festival 2021 award winners ==
Award	Film	Winner
Best Film	Voodoo Macbeth	
Best World Film	Reflection	
Best Documentary	100 Years from Mississippi	
Best World Documentary	Queens of the Revolution	
Audience Award	Coogan's Way	
Best Director	Sundays in July	Joseph E. Austin II
Best Documentary Director	Truth to Power: Barbara Lee Speaks for Me	Abby Ginzberg
Mira Nair Award for Rising Female Filmmaker	All on a Summer's Day	Avril E. Russell
Best Actress	Voodoo Macbeth	Inger Tudor
Best Actor	Kalel, 15	Elijah Canlas
Best Production	Voodoo Macbeth	
New York Vision Award	Full Circle	
Best Short	Baby	
Best Short Short	Before I Knew	
Best Short Documentary	Anthony Crawford - The Man the South Forgot	
Harlem Spotlight	The Drop Shot	
Uptown Award	First Move	
Best Youth Short	I'm Ready	
Best Animation	Gon, the Little Fox	
Best Experimental Film	Summer in Hindsight	
Best Music Video	Skyrocket	
Winning Webisode	Praize	
Best Virtual Reality	Hominidae	
Winning Feature Screenplay	Ella, Witnessing	
Winning Short Script	Survival as a Ghostwriter	

== Harlem International Film Festival 2020 award winners ==
Award	Film	Winner
Best Film	Haingosoa	
Best World Film	Omar and Us	
Best Documentary	Thumbs Up for Mother Universe	
Best World Documentary	Opeka	
Audience Award	The Patterson	
Best Director	Thin Skin	Charles Mudede
Best Documentary Director	El Susto	Karen Akins
Mira Nair Award for Rising Female Filmmaker	The Subject	Lanie Zipoy
Best Actress	Iska	Ruby Ruiz
Best Actor	Waiting	Khalid Ahmed
Best Production	Before the Fire	
New York Vision Award	#like	
Best Short	Little Brother	
Best Short Short	W	
Best Short Documentary	Finding Elijah	
Harlem Spotlight	Frederick Douglass Boulevard AKA Food & Drink Boulevard AKA F.D.B.	
Uptown Award	Sundays at the Triple Nickel	
Best Youth Short	Shine & Shade	
Best Animation	Malakout	
Best Experimental Film	Bubble	
Best Music Video	On My Mind	
Winning Webisode	Before We Wrap	
Best Virtual Reality	Reconstruct: Five Confederates and a Tennis Player	
Winning Feature Screenplay	The Ambassador of Love	
Winning Short Script	Channel Bibi	

== Harlem International Film Festival 2019 award winners ==
Award	Film	Winner
Best Film	Wheels	
Best World Film	Doing Money	
Best Documentary	The Last American Colony: One Man's Revolution	
Best World Documentary	Eliades Ochoa: From Cuba to the World	
Audience Award	Strive	
Best Director	Katrina's Dream	Mirko & Dario Bischofberger
Best Documentary Director	Madagasikara	Cam Cowan
Mira Nair Award for Rising Female Filmmaker	Boy Genius	Bridget Stokes
Best Actress	Strive	Joi Starr
Best Actor	Goliath	Sven Schelker
Best Cinematography	No Way Out	
New York Showcase Award	Decade of Fire	
Best Short	83 Days	
Best Short Short	The Highbridge	
Best Short Documentary	The Man of the Trees	
Harlem Spotlight (Feature)	When Harlem Saved a King	
Uptown Award (Feature)	Seaman and 207	
Uptown Award (Short)	Chevere con Salsa	
Best Youth Short	We the Children	
Best Animation	Substance	
Best Experimental Film	Salt Water	
Best Music Video	Ice Moon	
Winning Webisode	Gray Ground	
Best Virtual Reality	The Negro Building VR Experience	
Winning Feature Screenplay	Harlem Fever	
Winning Short Script	Woke?	

== Harlem International Film Festival 2018 award winners ==
Award	Film	Winner
Best Film	The Best of All Worlds	
Best World Film	Elvis Walks Home	
Best Documentary	My Tourette's	
Best World Documentary	Retracing Jeneba	
Audience Award	The Rainbow Experiment	
Best Director	Mandela's Gun	John Irvin
Best Documentary Director	The Jazz Ambassadors	Hugo Berkeley
Mira Nair Award for Rising Female Filmmaker	Incarcerated Rhythm	Indrani Kopal
Best Experimental Film	The Silent Eye	
Best Actress	The Best of All Worlds	Verena Altenberger
Best Actor	Mandela's Gun	Tumisho Masha
Best Cinematography	Sayakbay	
New York Showcase Award	Write When You Get Work	
Harlem Spotlight (Feature)	The Breeding	
Harlem Spotlight (Short)	Congo Cabaret	
Best Short	Hold Me Down	
Best Short Documentary	Home Street Home	
Best Youth Short	Blacked Out	
Best Animation	Two Balloons	
Best Music Video	Stand Down	
Winning Webisode	A Whole New Irving	
Winning Feature Screenplay	The Other Side	Alexandra Farias
Winning Short Script	Crushing	Simbi Kali

== Harlem International Film Festival 2017 award winners ==
Award	Film	Winner
Best Film	Krotoa	
Best World Film	Groom's Block	
Best Documentary	Garden of the Peaceful Dragon	
Best World Documentary	Servant or Slave	
Audience Award	Curtsy, Mister	
Best Director	Moscow Never Sleeps	Johnny O'Reilly
Best Documentary Director	The Land Beneath Our Feet	Sarita Siegel & Gregg Mitman
Mira Nair Award for Rising Female Filmmaker	NANA	Serena Dykman
Best Actress	Ordinary People	Hasmine Killip
Best Actor	Ordinary People	Ronwaldo Martin
New York Showcase Award	Day After Day	
Harlem Spotlight (Documentary)	The Speech	
Harlem Spotlight (Short Narrative)	Search Party	
Harlem Spotlight (Short Documentary)	A Girl Can Dream… Bre Scullark	
Best Experimental Film	White Face	
Best Short	Dem Dem!	
Best Short Short	Hello, Malcolm	
Best Short Documentary	The Sara Spencer Washington Story	
Best Youth Short Documentary	Statement of Truth	
Best Youth Short	Cocoa Butter Short	
Best Animation	Trip to the Stars	
Best Music Video	Iridescence	
Winning Webisode	The New Adventures of Brobot Johnson	
Winning Feature Screenplay	Ghost Patriot	Todd Wise
Winning Short Script	Eleventh Earl of Getzford	Jess Grant

== Harlem International Film Festival 2016 award winners ==
Award	Film	Winner
Best Film	Children of the Mountain	
Best World Film	Hear the Silence / Höre Die Stille	
Best Documentary	I Go Back Home – Jimmy Scott	
Best World Documentary	Nuclear Neighbour	
Audience Award	Thirsty	
Best Director	Good Grief	Brandon Ford Green
Best Documentary Director	Rigoberta Menchú Tum – Daughter of the Maya	Dawn Engle
Mira Nair Award for Rising Female Filmmaker	For Kibera!	Kati Juurus
Best Cinematography	The Sister	
Best Editing	West Coast	
Best Actress	Children of the Mountain	Rukiyat Masud
Best Actor	Rain the Color Blue with a Little Red in It	Mdou Moctar
Best Ensemble Cast	42 Seconds of Happiness	
Most Remarkable Young Person on Screen	Two Worlds	Laura Gontarczyk
Most Remarkable Young Person on Screen	Jonas and the Backyard Circus	Jonas Laborda
Most Remarkable Young Person on Screen	Kojo	Kojo Roney
Most Remarkable Young Person on Screen	Good Funk	Leonay Shepherd
Most Remarkable Young Person on Screen	Thrive	Matthew Whitaker
New York Showcase Award	H.O.M.E.	
Harlem Spotlight (Short Documentary)	By Jamal Joseph	
Harlem Spotlight (Short Narrative)	World's Not For Me	
Harlem Spotlight (Feature)	Good Funk	
Harlem Spotlight (Documentary)	Daddy Don't Go	
Best Experimental Film	The Sky Over Berlin of My Childhood	
Best Youth Feature	The Remnant	
Best Youth Short Documentary	Out of the Ashes	
Best Youth Short	Let's Stay Together	
Top Ten Best Shorts	A Beautiful Day	
Top Ten Best Shorts	Any Day Now	
Top Ten Best Shorts	Boat People	
Top Ten Best Shorts	MBFF	
Top Ten Best Shorts	Neurophreak	
Top Ten Best Shorts	Princess Eun Hwa	
Top Ten Best Shorts	Shen	
Top Ten Best Shorts	The Frozen Eye	
Top Ten Best Shorts	The Telegram Man	
Top Ten Best Shorts	Ugly	
Best Short Documentaries	Do You Hear What I Hear?	
Best Short Documentaries	One Day at a Time	
Best Short Documentaries	Soul City	
Best Short Shorts	L'Encenedor Quàntic	
Best Short Shorts	The Crip Who Loves Yoga	
Best Short Shorts	Thrive	
Best Animation	Sisters	
Best Animation	The Night Witch	
Best Music Video	Bangers	
Best Music Video	Dove	
Winning Webisode (Narrative)	Everything I Did Wrong in My 20s	
Winning Webisode (Documentary)	My Life Offline	
Winning Feature Script	Riding on Duke's Train	Ken Kimmelman & Mick Carlon
Winning Short Script	Run, My Dear	Marjory Kaptanoglu

== Harlem International Film Festival 2015 award winners ==
Award	Film	Winner
Best Film	America is Still the Place	
Best World Film	My Life with the King	
Best Documentary	Adolfo Perez Esquivel: Rivers of Hope	
Best World Documentary	Zemene	
Audience Award	Korla	
Best Director	Wildlike	Frank Hall Green
Best Documentary Director	American Native	Steven Oritt
Mira Nair Award for Rising Female Filmmaker	Behind Some Dark Cloud	Chelsea Kane
New York Showcase Award	Kensho at the Bedfellow	
Best Youth Actress	Before the Bomb	Sterling Jerins
Best Youth Actor	Hagereseb	Joseph Smith
Best Actress	Wildlike	Ella Purnell
Best Actor	The Last Saint	Beulah Koale
Harlem Spotlight (Short Documentary)	Serenity Garden	
Harlem Spotlight (Short Narrative)	King of Guangzhou	
Harlem Spotlight (Feature)	Subways	
Harlem Spotlight (Documentary)	The Beauty That I Saw	
Best Cinematography	Eventide	
Best Youth Feature	My Voice, My Life	
Best Youth Short Documentary	Call Me Joe	
Best Youth Short	Falling	
Top Ten Best Shorts	Tom in America	
Top Ten Best Shorts	The Dangle	
Top Ten Best Shorts	Hagareseb	
Top Ten Best Shorts	Before the Bomb	
Top Ten Best Shorts	Love Always Eartha	
Top Ten Best Shorts	Keeper of the Past	
Top Ten Best Shorts	The Bravest, the Boldest	
Top Ten Best Shorts	The Story of a Rainy Night	
Top Ten Best Shorts	The Yellow Festival	
Top Ten Best Shorts	Welcome	
Best Short Documentaries	Code Oakland	
Best Short Documentaries	Even The Walls	
Best Short Documentaries	Sir Shadow	
Best Short Documentaries	Why We Stay	
Best Short Shorts	Split End	
Best Short Shorts	Unforgiven	
Best Short Shorts	Breaking in	
Best Short Shorts	Project Brave	
Best Short Shorts	I've Just Had a Dream	
Best Animation	Golden Shot	
Best Music Video	Chops	
Winning Feature Script	Hell and Hallelujah!	Margaret Ford-Rogers & Shaytee Gadson
Winning Short Script	The Real Man	Cathy Reinking & Darryl Dillard

== Harlem International Film Festival 2014 award winners ==
Award	Film	Winner
Best Film	Kamkam
Best World Film	Depois da Chuva
Best Documentary	The Cooler Bandits
Best World Doc	Brown Bread
Best Director	Tempo Girl	Dominik Locher
Best Documentary Director	You have his Eyes	Christopher Wilson
Mira Nair Award For; Rising Female Filmmaker	Redemption Trail	Britta Sjogren
Audience Award	Children of the Light
Best Experimental Film	Duran / Circling
Best Actor	Magkakabaung	Allen Dizon
	101 Chodyangal	Minon
Best Actress	Love Me	Viktoria Spesyvtseva
Best Cinematography	Si-o-se Pol	Kristian Leschner
Best Short Documentary	The Game Changer	Indrani Kopal
Best Short Shorts	18 Seconds
	Berxen Kulek
	La Loteria
	One Question
	The Devil Goes Down
	The Way You Love
Best Short	0.60 MG
	Battle Of Island Mound
	Fleecing Led Zeppelin
	Into The Silent Sea
	Kasita
	La Donna
	The Perfect Sacrifice
Best Animation	Le Gouffre
	Puggums
Best Youth Feature	Flying Paper
Best Youth Short Documentary	A Teen's Guide to Understanding and Communicating with People with Autism
Best Youth Short	Perfect Day
Best Music Video	The Lion
Harlem Spotlight (feature)	Know How
Harlem Spotlight (documentary)	Changing Face of Harlem
Winning Feature Script	The Blacktivist
Winning Short Script	Brewster Commons

== Harlem International Film Festival 2013 award winners ==
Award	Film	Winner
Best Film	Clutter	Diane Crespo
Best World Film	Tu Seras Un Homme (You'll Be A Man)	Benoit Cohen
Best Documentary	Lessons of Hayti	Edward J. Harris II and Byron Hunter
Best World Doc	Post 9-11: Fear, Anger & Politics	Nadia Zouaoui
Best Director	Four of Hearts	Eric Haywood
Best Documentary Director	16 Acres	Richard Hankin
Mira Nair Award For; Rising Female Filmmaker	Bittersweet Monday	Jaime Lee
Audience Award	Sex, Love & Salsa	Adrian Manzano
Best Experimental Film	Objects Attack!	Rona Mark
Best Actor	Dar He: The Lynching of Emmett Till	Mike Wiley
Best Actress	Nuwebe	Barbara Miguel
Best Cinematography	The Passage	Alexander Douglas
Best Short Documentary	Not Anymore: A Story of Revolution	Matthew Vandyke
Best Short	Daughter	Assia Lakhlif
	Empty Paper Bag	Majid Sarvini
	Farewell Jimmy	Sanghyun Kim
	Kombra	Ali Kamanda
	Pillowcase	David Lombroso
	Sum-ba-kok-jil (Hide ‘n Seek)	Hanuk Lee
	Sweet, Sweet Country	Dehanza Rogers
	The Projectionist	Najat Jellab
Best Animation	Daddy ABC	Hamad Alawar
	Ed	Gabriel Garcia
Best Youth Short	Remain Still	Armaan Uplekar
Best Music Video	Sufferin' Till You're Straight	David Scheve
Harlem Spotlight (feature)	Fight, Dance Sing	Kamal Robinson
Harlem Spotlight (short)	Happy New Year!	Judianny Compress
Winning Feature Script	The Rose That Grew From Concrete: The Story of Tupac Amaru Shakur	Reginald Jackson
Winning Short Script	She Was Left Alone	Bela Wolf

== Harlem International Film Festival 2012 award winners ==
Award	Film	Winner
Best Film	True Bromance	Sebastian Doggart (UK, US)
Best World Film	A.L.F.	Jérôme Lescure (France)
Best Documentary	Herman's House (Canada, US)	Angad Bhalla
Best World Documentary	Not My Life (Brazil, Cambodia, Egypt, Ghana, Guatemala, India, Italy, Romania, Senegal, US)	Robert Bilheimer
Best Director	The Talk Man (US)	Gene Gallerano
Best Documentary Director	Mas Man (Trinidad & Tobago, US)	Dalton Narine
Mira Nair Award for Rising Female Filmmaker	A Gran Plan (Singapore)	Sangeeta Nambiar
Audience Award	The Glamorous Lie (US)
Best Actor	Hombre y Tierra (US)	Maurice Ripke directed by Christian Cisneros
Best Actress	A Gran Plan (Singapore)	Farida Jalal directed by Sangeeta Nambiar
Best Short Documentary	Check the Rhyme (US)	Tim Smoove
Top Seven Shorts (narrative)	Amos (US)	Taylor Maxwell
	I Can Smoke? (US)	Tony Ducret
	Playing Grown Up (Mexico)	Javier Solorzano Casarin
	Shoot the Moon	Alexander Gaeta (US)
	The Darkness is Close Behind (US)	Sheena Mccann
	The Hole (South Korea)	Joon Seong Ahn
	The Pilgrim & the Private Eye (US)	Joel Johnstone
Best Short Shorts (12 Minutes And Under)	And I on the Opposite Shore (US)	Mozell Miley-Bailey
	Co Raz Zostalo Zapisane (Poland)	Martin Rath
	Raise My Hands (Ireland)	Frank Kelly
	The Future (Australia)	Venetia Taylor
	The World Outside (US)	Zachary Kerschberg
Best Animation	The Hopper Alex Brüel Flagstad (Denmark)	Wolf Dog Tales Bernadine Santistevan (US)
Best Youth (Feature) Film	Brooklyn Bridges (Palestine, US)	Fran Tarr
Best Youth Short	Cross Court (US)	Rafael Cortina
Best Music Video	Soldier (US)	Cinque Northern
Harlem Spotlight	Stonefaced (US)	Vivian Ducat
Winning Feature Script	Eternal Spring Fist	Erik Bernard
Winning Short Script	The Tenth Door	Michael D. Lies
Screenplay Finalists	Hope is Not a Black and White Rainbow	Harold Brown
	Resilience	Lena Slachmuijlder
	You Dresses, Me Shoes	S.A. Green
Screenplay Semi-finalists	Fall Out	Michael Gold
	In 2 Me U	Kimberly Fernandez & Jeanette Villafane
	Kingpin	R.M. Chepesiuk
	Undivided	Trevor and Troy Parham
