= Bahar Dutt =

Indian journalist (born 1975)

- Born: c. 1975; New Delhi, Delhi, India
- Education: University of Delhi; University of Kent
- Occupations: Television journalist and environmental editor
- Employer: CNN-IBN Live
- Known for: environmental journalism
- Spouse: Vijay Bedi
- Children: 1
- Parents: SP Dutt (father); Prabha Dutt (mother)
- Relatives: Barkha Dutt (sister)
- Website: Beasts in My Belfry

Bahar Dutt (born 20 June 1975) is an Indian television journalist and environmental editor and columnist for CNN-IBN.

== Early life ==
Bahar Dutt is the daughter of SP Dutt and Prabha Dutt, who was among India's first female journalists and influenced Bahar's career path. Bahar Dutt is the sister of well-known journalist Barkha Dutt.

Bahar is the only Indian environmental journalist to have won Green Oscar for her reporting on environment issues in India.

Dutt is a wildlife conservationist by training. She first earned a degree in social work from University of Delhi. Dutt then pursued wildlife conservation at the Durrell Institute of Conservation and Ecology from the University of Kent and earned her MSc degree.

== Career ==
Before turning to journalism, Dutt worked on her own conservation projects. She spent seven years with the Bahelias, or snake charmers, across Haryana and Rajasthan in northern India. India's Wildlife Protection Act of 1972 made wild animals public property, which made the snake charmers' practice of catching snakes and training them illegal. Dutt worked with them to combine their knowledge of snakes and musical abilities into public performances and education without the use of snakes. In that project she merged wildlife conservation and heritage preservation. Her work with the snake charmers was featured in media.

She was hired in 2005 to be an environmental journalist by Rajdeep Sardesai. For CNN-IBN she is the Environment Editor, she has done undercover investigations, news reports. Her reportage has influenced policy and led to the stoppage of many illegal projects coming up on wetlands and forests

== Notable works of journalism ==
In 2006, she directed Last Dance of the Sarus. This was an award-winning investigative news piece about the drainage of wetlands in eastern India that are the habitat of almost a third of the world's sarus cranes. The drainage project was for the proposed development of an airport.

Bahar recently released her book, Green Wars. The book draws on Dutt's experience as a conservationist to look at how the tension between a modernising economy and saving the planet can be resolved.

== Awards ==
- 2006 Ramnath Goenka Award for excellence in environmental reporting for Last Dance of the Sarus
- 2006 Wildscreen Award (International). Dutt was awarded a "Red Panda" in 2006 for Last Dance of the Sarus in the news category by the Wildscreen Festival.
- 2007 Young Environment Journalist Award
- 2009 Sanctuary-RBS Wildlife Awards. Dutt was awarded the Wings award for raising the stature of environmental journalism.
- 2009 Sanskriti award
