= Rahul Kanwal =

Indian television journalist

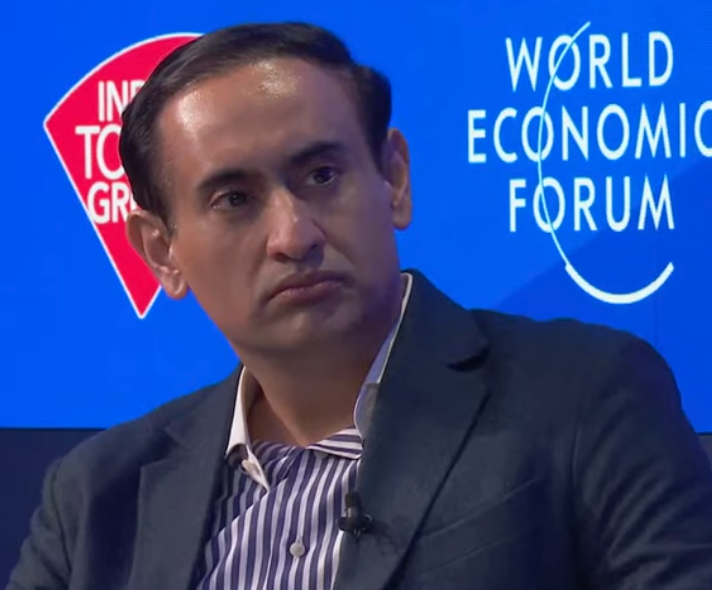
- At the WEF Annual Meeting in 2025
- Born: 14 September 1980 (age 46); Patna, Bihar, India
- Education: Delhi University; Cardiff University
- Occupations: Journalist; News presenter
- Employer: NDTV

Rahul Kanwal (born 1980) is an Indian TV news anchor and journalist working as CEO and Editor-in-Chief at NDTV, worked as News Director at India Today before joining NDTV. He was the anchor host of the prime-time show Newstrack on weekdays and the interview-based show Jab We Met on India Today TV.

== Education and career ==
Kanwal studied at St. Joseph's College, Allahabad. He then studied journalism at Delhi college of arts and commerce (Delhi University.) He is a Chevening scholar and did a program in International Broadcast Journalism at Cardiff University. He won a Rory Peck Trust grant for a course in Hostile Environment Journalism.

Kanwal started his career in 1999 as an anchor-cum-reporter with Zee News and joined Aaj Tak in 2002. He has also served as the Editor-at-Large of Aaj Tak and India Today in TV Today Group. In 2019, Kanwal interviewed India's union minister, Piyush Goyal, and questioned the minister over the Balakot strikes. He was criticized for simulating a skirmish between CRPF and Naxal insurgents in his TV show.

== Awards ==
In 2013, Kanwal was awarded the best anchor at the Indian Television Academy Awards.

He was awarded the National annual award as part of the Maharana of Mewar Charitable Foundation in 2016.

In 2019, he was awarded in the Best Anchor category at the Exchange4media News Broadcasting Awards.
