= 16 Acres =

- Directed by: Richard Hankin
- Produced by: Matt Kapp; Mike Marcucci
- Production company: Tanexis Productions
- Distributed by: First Run Features
- Release date: November 16, 2012
- Running time: 92 minutes
- Country: United States
- Language: English

16 Acres is a 2012 documentary film directed by Richard Hankin which provides an account of the recovery effort following the September 11 attacks, specifically the reconstruction process of the World Trade Center site. The name of the documentary refers to the 16 acres (6.5 hectares) of land that the site is on.

It features interviews with Michael Bloomberg, George Pataki, Chris Ward, Larry Silverstein, Daniel Libeskind, David Childs, Michael Arad, Janno Lieber, Roland Betts, Rosaleen Tallon, and Scott Raab.
