= F.I.R. (TV series) =

Indian sitcom series

- Genre: Sitcom
- Written by: Amit Aaryan
- Directed by: Shashank Bali
- Starring: See below
- Theme music composer: Gaurav Vaswani
- Country of origin: India
- No. of seasons: 2
- No. of episodes: 1,323

Production
- Executive producer: Sayed Khan Ahemad
- Producers: Benaifer Kohli; Sanjay Kohli
- Cinematography: Raja Satankar
- Editor: Rahul Solanki
- Camera setup: Multi-camera
- Running time: 22 minutes
- Production company: Edit 2 Productions

Original release
- Network: SAB TV
- Release: 31 July 2006 – 23 January 2015

F.I.R. is an Indian television sitcom produced by Edit 2 Productions that aired from 31 July 2006 to 23 January 2015 on SAB TV.

== Plot ==
F.I.R. is an acronym for first information report, a document that the Indian police prepares for each case to be investigated.

F.I.R. is centered on a Haryanvi female police officer named Chandramukhi Chautala and her three subordinates, Head Constable Gopinath Gandothra, Constable Mulayam Singh Gulgule, and Constable Billu, who later joined the Chowki. The show depicts their lives as they try to solve every case which comes to their police station Imaan Chowki, Ravanpur.

The show also features romantic storylines between Chandramukhi Chautala and each of the police station's chief inspectors, Hanuman Prasad Pandey, Raj Aaryan and Bajrang Pandey.

== Cast ==
=== Main ===
- Kavita Kaushik as Inspector Chandramukhi Chautala. She is the head of Imaan Police Station. Initially referred to as Sub Inspector, she was promoted to Inspector rank in 2014. Kavita left the show in March 2013 when she signed another show Tota Weds Maina. She returned to the show in July when 20 years leap storyline was cancelled. Kaushik also played the role of Chautala′s lookalike Sheetal in 2010 and Zeenat Bobby in 2012. (2006–2015)
- Gopi Bhalla as Head Constable Gopinath Gandotra, he is the head constable who always gets into trouble by Chandramukhi. He is married but flirts with other women including Lappi Luthra. Bhalla also played the role of Gandotra′s lookalike Balu in 2012. (2006–2015)
- Kiku Sharda as Constable Mulayam Singh Gulgule. He is the second head constable. He often talks about food and gets into trouble with Chandramukhi after getting carried away with talking too much. (2006–2014)
- Shiv Panditt as Senior Head Officer Hanuman Prasad Pandey aka Makkhan Singh. He is the senior head of the police station but later it was revealed that he is actually a con-man in disguise. He is the love interest of Chandramukhi but gets irritated by her flirting. (2006–2008)
- Ali Asgar as Senior Head Officer Raj Aaryan. He is the senior head officer before he left his job where Bajrang Pandey had replaced him. (2009–2011)
- Aamir Ali as Senior Head Officer Bajrang Pandey. He is the senior head replacing Raj. He is in love with Chandramukhi but can't tell his feelings as his guru have told him not to. (2011–2013, 2014–2015)
- Sandeep Anand as Constable Billu. He is the brother in law of commissioner Suraj. Billu is often up to mischief with Gopi which Chandramukhi doesn't like. He has always have wanted to get married which makes him a bit emotional as well. Anand played various characters before he started playing the role of Billu in 2012. (2010–2015)
- Chitrashi Rawat as Inspector Jwalamukhi Chautala. Chandramukhi's daughter. She entered after Chandramukhi left her job. However, later it was revealed that it was just Gopi's dream. (2013)
- Vipul Roy as Senior Head Officer Bhola Pandit. After the exit of Bajrang Pandey, Bhola came on board as the new senior head officer. He first met Chandramukhi after a misunderstanding as the former thought he was a goon which made him very scared of her. (2013–2014)

=== Recurring ===
- Suresh Chatwal as Commissioner Suraj Agnihotri (2006–2015)
- Garima Ajmani as Kokila "Koki" Shah (2006–2008)
- Daya Shankar Pandey as TV reporter (2006)
- Shekhar Shukla as various characters (2006–2015)
- Sapna Sikarwar as various characters; She also played the character of Billauti in 2013. (2006–2015)
- Manju Brijnandan Sharma as various characters; She also played the character of Billu’s mother-in-law in 2013. (2006–2015)
- Naveen Bawa as various characters (2006–2015)
- Manish Mishraa as various characters (2006)
- Yogesh Tripathi as various characters (2006–2015)
- Deepesh Bhan as various Characters; He also played the character of Constable Pappu in 2013. (2006–2015)
- Umesh Bajpai as various characters (2006–2015)
- Anup Upadhyay as various characters (2006–2011)
- Amit Bhatt as various characters (2006–2007)
- Kanika Maheshwari as Various characters (2007)
- Dilip Joshi as various characters (2007–2008)
- Rakesh Bedi as various characters (2007)
- Divyaalakshmi as Sub inspector Kokila "koki" Shah (2008–2011)
- Tanmay Vekaria as various characters (2008)
- Vihaan Kohli as Khanna ka Baccha (2009–2012)
- Vaibhav Mathur as various characters (2010–2015)
- Bharti Singh as Superintendent Kamsin Aaha (2012)
- Elena Lukienko as various characters (2012–2013)
- Saanand Verma as various characters (2013–2015)
- Prana Mishra as Well Gandotra (2013)
- Mohit Mattu as Constable Carryon Gandotra (2013)
- Nirmal Soni as Constable Malpua Gulgule (2013)
- Falguni Rajani as various characters (2013–2014)
- Ishwar Thakur as Hawaldar Golu (2013–2015)
- Kamya Panjabi as Bhanu Mitra (2014)
- Zarina Wahab as Bajrang Pandey's mother (2014)
- Ketkie Jayashree as Meena Ganpatrao Godbole (2014)
- Syed Salim Zaidi as various characters (2014)
- Rajeev Mehra as various characters (2014–2015)

=== Guest ===
- Shehzad Khan as Terrorist (2006)
- Karan Grover as Karan (2007)
- KK Goswami as ACP Action Pandey (2009)
- Kay Kay Menon as Benny (2010)
- Rajpal Yadav as Babloo (2010)
- John Abraham as Himself (2010)
- Pakhi Tyrewala as Herself (2010)
- Juhi Parmar as Meera (2012)
- Mika Singh as Himself (2014)
- Jackky Bhagnani as Himself (2014)
- Neha Sharma as Herself (2014)
- Viju Khote as Goga Pasha (2014)
- Shaan as Himself (2014)
- Vinod Singh as Chimpu Man (2014)

== Production ==
The show took a 20-year leap on 16 March 2013 when Kavita Kaushik, who played the lead role of Chandramukhi Chautala, departed from the show and Chitrashi Rawat was introduced as Jwalamukhi Chautala, Chandramukhi's daughter, who reveals that Chandramukhi married Bajrang Pandey and that they both had died. This 20-year-leap story wasn't much praised so the changes of 20-year leap were reverted on 8 July 2013 and the incidents which occurred in the 20-year leap were converted into constable Gopi's dream and the show then continued along with Chandramukhi Chautala's return.

In 2014, a live audience format was introduced for few episodes where the actors would perform on stage in front of live audience.

== Crossover and spin-off ==
Gopi Bhalla and Kiku Sharda as Gopinath Gandotra and Mulayam Singh Gulgule guest starred in another SAB TV sitcom Chidiya Ghar in 2012.

Gopinath Gandotra was also part of a spin-off show Gopi Gadha Aur Gupshup which aired in 2012.

In March 2022, Kaushik appeared as a guest in Maddam Sir, reprising the role of Chandramukhi Chautala.

== Awards and nominations ==
Year	Award	Category	Recipient(s)	Result
2007	Indian Telly Awards	Best Sitcom/Comedy Programme	F.I.R	Nominated
2007	Indian Telly Awards	Best Actress in a Comic Role	Kavita Kaushik	Nominated
2008	Indian Telly Awards	Best Actress in a Comic Role	Kavita Kaushik	Nominated
2009	Indian Telly Awards	Best Actress in a Comic Role	Kavita Kaushik	Nominated
2009	Indian Telly Awards	Popular Sitcom/Comedy Programme	F.I.R.	Nominated
2010	Indian Television Academy Awards	Best Show - Comedy	F.I.R.	Won
2010	Indian Television Academy Awards	Best Actress - Comedy	Kavita Kaushik	Won
2011	Indian Television Academy Awards	Best Actress - Comedy	Kavita Kaushik	Won
2012	Indian Television Academy Awards	ITA Award for Best Director Comedy	Shashank Bali	Won
2012	Indian Television Academy Awards	Best Show - Comedy	F.I.R.	Won
2012	People's Choice Awards India	Favourite TV Comedy	F.I.R.	Nominated
2012	People's Choice Awards India	Favourite TV Comedy Actress	Kavita Kaushik	Nominated
2012	Indian Telly Awards	Best Continuing TV Programme	F.I.R.	Nominated
2013	Indian Television Academy Awards	Best Actress - Comedy	Kavita Kaushik	Won
2014	Indian Television Academy Awards	ITA Award for Best Director Comedy	Shashank Bali	Won
2014	Indian Television Academy Awards	Best Dialogues – Comedy	Amit Aaryan	Won

== See also ==
- List of Hindi comedy shows
