= Mahal (1969 film) =

- Directed by: Shanker Mukherjee
- Starring: Dev Anand; Asha Parekh; Farida Jalal
- Music by: Kalyanji Anandji
- Release date: August 1970
- Country: India
- Language: Hindi

Mahal (lit. 'Palace') is a 1970 Indian mystery thriller film that stars Dev Anand, Asha Parekh, and Farida Jalal. The music was composed by Kalyanji Anandji. It was supposed to be released in 1969 but it was delayed and released in 1970. At the box office it was Commercial successful.

== Plot ==
Dev Anand (Rajesh) is a simple and poor driver-cum-assistant to a rich boss (Abhi Bhattacharya) in Kolkata. He is hard pressed for money for his sister's wedding, when out of the blue a stranger offers him money in return for playing an impostor of the nephew for a dying old man in Darjeeling who owns a palace and of course has millions worth of property.

What seems like a simple task for Dev Anand who is in love with another rich girl (Asha Parekh) turns out to be a vicious trap, where he is caught red handed in front of a dead man, who is actually the owner of the palace, but not the one Dev had been meeting there till now. Farida Jalal as the seductive nurse complicates matters.

Nothing is as it seems and it turns out to be a good whodunit mystery with Dev Anand on the run from law to prove his innocence. The identity of the real villain remains a mystery and the climax comes as a surprise.

== Cast ==
- Dev Anand as Rajesh Ratanlal Dixit / Ravinath Sharma
- Asha Parekh as Roopa
- Farida Jalal as Nurse
- Abhi Bhattacharya as Shyam
- David Abraham Cheulkar as Roopa's Dad (as David)
- Ratnamala as Roopa's mom
- Sunder as Pyare
- D. K. Sapru as Raja Dinanath / Badriprasad (as Sapru)
- Pratima Devi as Rajesh's mother
- Kamal Mehra as Jaikishan, guide in Darjeeling
- Murad (actor) as Police commissioner Ratan Singh
- Rajan Haksar as Motilal
- Manju Asrani as Motilal's girlfriend
- Azra as Chanda, (Munni) Dev Anand's sister
- R.P. Kapoor as Roopa's mamaji (uncle)
- Sudhir (Hindi actor) as Ramu / Inspector Rameshchandra Tripathi
- Ram singh as Raja Dinanath's chauffeur

== Soundtrack ==
| # | Title | Singer(s) |
|---|---|---|
| 1 | "Yeh Duniyawale Poochhenge" | Kishore Kumar, Asha Bhosle |
| 2 | "Ankhon Ankhon Mein Hum Tum Ho Gaye Deewane" | Kishore Kumar, Asha Bhosle |
| 3 | "O Tera Naam Leke" | Kishore Kumar |
| 4 | "Aaiye Aapka Tha Humen Intezar" | Dev Anand, Asha Bhosle |
| 5 | "Bade Khubsoorat Ho" | Lata Mangeshkar |
| 6 | "Hum Tujhe Dhoond Lenge" (Part 1) | Mohammed Rafi |
| 7 | "Hum Tujhe Dhoond Lenge" (Part 2) | Mohammed Rafi |
