= Khoj (1971 film) =

- Promotional Poster
- Directed by: Jugal Kishore
- Starring: Farida Jalal; Shatrughan Sinha; Deepak Kumar; Jayshree T.
- Music by: Usha Khanna
- Release date: 1971
- Running time: 180 minutes
- Country: India
- Language: Hindi

Khoj is a 1971 Indian Hindi-language thriller drama film directed and produced by Jugal Kishore, starring Farida Jalal, Shatrughan Sinha, Jayshree T. and Deepak Kumar in lead roles.

== Cast ==
- Deepak Kumar as Vinod
- Farida Jalal as Asha
- Shatrughan Sinha as Amar
- K. N. Singh as Gangster
- Jayshree T. as Deepa
- Mehmood Junior as Raju
- Leela Mishra as Vinod Mother
- Hira Lal as Gangster
- Brahmachari as Giridhar Gopal
- Rajan Kapoor as Inspector

== Music ==
1. "Ram Kare More Saiyya Ho Aise, Jaise Raadha Ke Shyam" - Suman Kalyanpur, Parveen Sultana
2. "Halka Halka Sa Rang Gulaabi Sa, Tera Chehra Lag Rha Hai" - Kishore Kumar, Mohammed Rafi
3. "Maine Tujhse Kiya Hai Pyar, O Meri Mehbooba Ye Dil Tujhko Hi Dunga" - Mohammed Rafi
4. "Jiske Pyar Ke Aage Is Duniya Ka Sar Jhuk Jaata Hai" - Usha Khanna, Suman Kalyanpur
5. "Yeh Tanhaai Yeh Jazbaat, Aur Tum Mere Sath" - Suman Kalyanpur, Usha Khanna
6. "Ruk Jaa Ae Albeli Jara Ruk Jaa, Ye JethKi Chanchal Dhoop Hai" - Kishore Kumar
