= Paras (1971 film) =

- Directed by: C.P Dixit
- Written by: S. M. Abbas
- Produced by: N.N Sippy; M.A Madhu
- Starring: Sanjeev Kumar; Raakhee; Mehmood; Farida Jalal; Shatrughan Sinha
- Cinematography: K.H Kapadia
- Edited by: Waman Bhosle; Guru Dutt
- Music by: Kalyanji Anandji
- Release date: 6 July 1971
- Country: India
- Language: Hindi

Paras is a 1971 Indian Hindi-language drama film directed by C.P Dixit starring Sanjeev Kumar, Raakhee, Mehmood, Farida Jalal, Shatrughan Sinha and Madan Puri.

== Plot ==
Dharam Singh is an honest farmer in rural India, and lives with his sister, Bela, who is now of marriageable age. One day both brother and sister witness a murder, and haul the killer to the nearest police station, where the killer is charged, arrested, and held for court. The killer is none other than the powerful and influential Arjun Singh's brother. When Arjun learns that Dharam and Bela are the only witnesses to this murder, he attempts to bribe them, albeit in vain, and his brother is sentenced to be hanged. In order to escape Arjun's wrath, Dharam relocates to the city, to earn a living, and thereby help his sister get married. Arjun sets fire to Dharam's house in the village, abducts Bela, and attempts to rape her, but she escapes, and searches for Dharam. After several months, she spots Dharam in the city in the company of a rich woman, Barkha. When she approaches Dharam, he refuses to recognize her, and has nothing to do with her.

== Cast ==
- Sanjeev Kumar as Dharam Singh
- Raakhee as Barkha Singh
- Mehmood as Munna Sarkar
- Farida Jalal as Bela Singh
- Shatrughan Sinha as Thakur Arjun Singh
- Madan Puri as Thakur Prithvi Singh
- Mukri as Manager
- Murad as Judge
- Viju Khote as Munna Sarkar friend

== Music ==
The film's music was composed by the duo Kalyanji Anandji and the film's songs were written by Indeevar, Qamar Jalalabadi and Verma Malik.

1. "Gali Gali Aur Gaon Gaon Me Pito Aaj Dhindhora" – Kishore Kumar
2. "Man Mera Tujhko Mange, Dur Dur Tu Bhage" – Suman Kalyanpur
3. "Tere Honthon Ke Do Phul Pyaare Pyaare" – Lata Mangeshkar, Mukesh
4. "Sajna Ke Samne Main To Rahungi Chup" – Asha Bhosle
5. "O Jugni Kehti Hai Baat Pate Ki, Yaad Rakhna Ye" – Asha Bhosle
6. "Suno Saathiyon, Sacchai Se Bad Kar Dharm Nhi Koi Duja" – Asha Bhosle, Mahendra Kapoor

== Awards and nominations ==
- Filmfare Best Comedian Award for Mehmood
- Filmfare Award for Best Supporting Actress for Farida Jalal
