= Barkha Dutt =

Indian television journalist and author

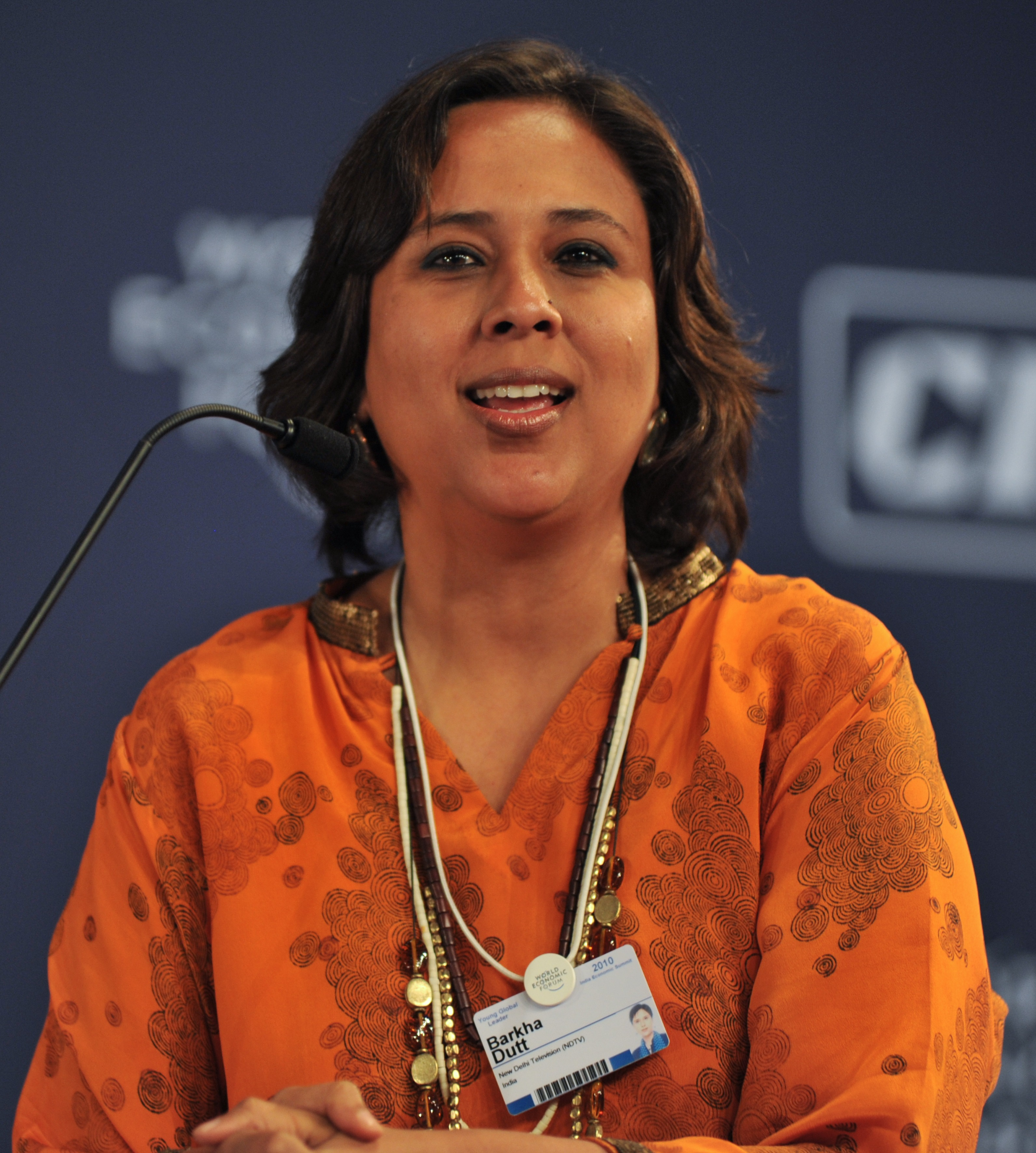
- Dutt at the World Economic Forum, 2010
- Born: 18 December 1971 (age 54); New Delhi, India
- Education: St. Stephen's College, Delhi (BA); Jamia Millia Islamia (MA); Columbia University (MS)
- Occupation: News Anchor
- Years active: 1991–present
- Notable credit(s): We the People; The Buck Stops Here
- Relatives: Bahar Dutt (sister)
- Awards: Padma Shri

Barkha Dutt is an Indian television journalist and author. She has been a reporter and news anchor at NDTV and Tiranga TV. She currently runs her own digital news channel called 'MoJo Story'.

Dutt was part of NDTV's team for 21 years, until she left the channel in January 2017. She emerged as a prominent figure after her frontline war reporting on the Kargil Conflict between India and Pakistan in 1999. Dutt has won many national and international awards, including the Padma Shri, India's fourth highest civilian honour. Dutt was one of the journalists taped in the Radia tapes controversy.

== Personal life ==
She was born in New Delhi to S. P. Dutt, an Air India official, and Prabha Dutt, who was a well-known journalist with the Hindustan Times. Dutt credits her journalistic skills to her mother, a pioneer among women journalists in India. Her younger sister, Bahar Dutt, is also a television journalist working for CNN IBN.

== Career ==
Dutt graduated from St. Stephen's College, Delhi with a degree in English literature. She received a Master's in Mass Communications from Jamia Millia Islamia Mass Communication Research Center, New Delhi. She started her journalism career with NDTV and later rose to head the English news wing of the organisation. She also obtained a master's degree in journalism from Columbia University's Graduate School of Journalism, New York assisted by an Inlaks Shivdasani Foundation scholarship. Her reporting of the Kargil conflict in 1999, including an interview with Captain Vikram Batra, brought her to prominence in India. She has since covered conflicts in Kashmir, Pakistan, Afghanistan and Iraq.

While covering the events of 2002 Gujarat violence, Dutt identified attackers and victims of a riot as "Hindus" and "Muslims" on television, flouting the guidelines of the Press Council of India. She has received negative reception for some of her work. For 2008 Mumbai attacks, she was blamed for sensationalising the events, putting lives at risk and causing deaths by identifying on live television where the hotel guests might be located. Britta Ohm wrote in 2011 that Dutt is criticised for "secular shrillness", betraying the cause of Kashmiri Pandits, over-the-top nationalism in the reporting of Kargil conflict, and for soft-pedalling Hindutva.

Dutt, who was group editor of NDTV, moved to the role of consulting editor in February 2015 and after 21 years, left in January 2017. She has also written columns for international newspapers, such as The Washington Post.

During the COVID-19 Migration Crisis, her extensive on-road coverage documented the difficulties faced by migrant workers all over North India.

In 2025, she appeared on The Piers Morgan Show: Uncensored, alongside podcaster Ranveer Allahbadia, to participate in a debate against Hina Rabbani Khar and stand-up comedian Shehzad Ghias Shaikh amidst the 2025 India–Pakistan conflict.

== Controversies ==
=== 2010 Radia tapes controversy ===
In November 2010, the magazines OPEN and Outlook published transcripts of some telephone conversations between Nira Radia with some senior journalists, politicians, and corporates. The Central Bureau of Investigation announced that they had 5,851 recordings of phone conversations by Radia, some of which outline Radia's attempts to broker deals in relation to the 2G spectrum sale. Dutt's conversations with Radia were reported and Dutt became the face of the tapes scandal. On 30 November 2010, Dutt defended herself before a jury of her peers in a televised program on NDTV. Dutt apologised over the issue saying it was "an error of judgement" on her part, but said that she had not indulged in any wrongdoing. Magazine editor Hartosh Singh Bal said that "proximity of NDTV and Tehelka are concerned, their closeness to the Congress is no secret. Dutt's role in the Radia Tapes did not seem to point to an individual act but an institutional malaise."

=== Tiranga TV controversy ===
Barkha Dutt served as an anchor and consulting editor at Tiranga TV from 26 January to 13 July 2019. Her show was titled Democracy Live. In July 2019, reports emerged that she was sacked by the Tiranga TV owners Kapil Sibal and his wife Promila Sibal on 'disciplinary grounds'. Dutt disputed this version of events by Sibals, claimed she was sacked for speaking out in internal emails against the treatment of other staffers, and vowed to sue the channel owners in court.

== Awards and honours ==
Dutt's Sunday talk show has won the most awards out of any show on Indian television, winning the Indian Television Academy award for Best Talk Show five years in a row. In 2012, the Association for International Broadcasting awarded Dutt the title of "TV Personality of the year" with the following citation: "a reporter of considerable stretch and depth, still passionate and fearless in bringing the issues closer to her viewers." Dutt was the recipient of the C H Mohammed Koya National Journalism Award in 2009. In 2008, Dutt received the Indian News Broadcasting Award for the Most Intelligent News Show Host. Dutt received the Commonwealth Broadcasting Association award for Journalist of the Year, 2007. She was awarded "Best TV News Anchor (English) for her programme "We the people" at the first Indian News Television Awards in 2007.

In 2008, the Indian government headed by Manmohan Singh awarded Dutt the Padma Shri, a civilian honour, for her coverage of the 2004 tsunami.

She has twice been named on the list of 100 "Global Leaders of Tomorrow" compiled by the World Economic Forum (2001, 2008). In 2005, she was among 50 Indians who were 35 or younger and listed for their achievements and impact on society.

In 2010, she was appointed as a member of India's National Integration Council. She was named an Asia Society Fellow in 2006 and serves on the International Advisory Council of the Asia Society.

Dutt was awarded the Chameli Devi Jain Award for Outstanding Women Mediapersons in 2000.

== In popular culture ==
As per movie reviewers and critics, Dutt has been a model for the portrayal of journalist characters in several Hindi movies. Some of these are –

- In the 2004 movie Lakshya, Preity Zinta played a female journalist reporting on the 1999 Kargil Conflict.
- In the 2006 Malayalam film Keerthi Chakra, a journalist character is said to be based on Dutt. The journalist’s use of flash photography exposes soldiers’ positions, leading to the death of one of them. The protagonist, played by Mohanlal, later confronts her for photographing a sensitive combat zone.
- In the 2008 movie Firaaq, a TV viewer is shown responding to Dutt's commentary on the 2002 Gujarat riots as "They [English speaking news reporters] all tell lies ... where were they when the Hindus were being killed".
- In the 2010 satire Peepli Live, the character of the news anchor was modelled on Sagarika Ghose or Barkha Dutt, according to movie critic Raja Sen. Sen wrote that in the movie, the news anchor only cared about TRPs and "squealed inexplicably in English" even when her subject was Hindi-speaking central India.
- In the 2011 movie No One Killed Jessica, Rani Mukerji played a news reporter who is first seen in the movie reporting on the 1999 Kargil Conflict is portraying Dutt's character.
- In the 2014 movie Singham Returns, Ashwini Kalsekar played a TV journalist role inspired by Dutt.
- Dutt was the model for the protagonist in Anand Kurian's novel The Peddler of Soaps.

== Publications ==
- Dutt co-authored the chapter "'Nothing new?': Women as Victims" in the 2002 book Gujarat: The Making of a Tragedy.
- This Unquiet Land: Stories from India's Fault Lines (2016).
- To Hell and Back: Humans of Covid (2022)
