= Scott Raab =

American journalist (born 1952)

Scott Raab (born August 6, 1952) is an American nonfiction author and former contributing journalist for Esquire.

== Early years ==
Scott Raab was born in Cleveland, Ohio, in 1952. The Raab family relocated to Los Angeles in 1960, but after his parents divorced in 1962, he returned to Cleveland with his mother and two younger brothers. Raab graduated from Cleveland State in 1983 with a bachelor's degree, and in 1986 received his Master of Fine Arts in fiction from the Iowa Writers' Workshop.

== Professional career ==
Raab was a writer for GQ Magazine from 1992 until 1997, and was a regular contributor to Esquire from 1997 until 2016. Much of his work at Esquire was one-on-one interviews with various celebrities (e.g. Phil Spector, Paul Giamatti, Don Zimmer). The style of his non-interview writing is typically informal in nature, mainly in the voice of a storyteller.

== Personal ==
Raab has described himself as a "fat Jew from Cleveland, a great deli town" and has written about his preference for traditional deli fare over haute cuisine. Although not primarily a food writer, he has frequently written about the Cleveland food scene and has repeatedly praised Slyman's Deli's award-winning corned-beef sandwich in articles for Esquire.

He is a remarried divorcé, who currently lives in New Jersey with his wife and son.

A fan of the Cleveland Indians, Raab has a tattoo of Chief Wahoo on his forearm, which he had done in a Dallas tattoo parlor during a 1994 interview with NBA player Dennis Rodman. He has since advocated for the logo to be retired.

== Bibliography ==
- Real Hollywood stories: inside the minds of 20 celebrities, with one A-list writer. 2008.
- The Whore of Akron: one man's search for the soul of LeBron James. 2011.
- "[Interview with] Nick Tosches". Man at His Best. Esquire. 159 (1): 15–18. January 2013.
- "Sean Penn". What I've Learned. The Warrior. Esquire. 159 (1): 62–66. January 2013.
- You're Welcome, Cleveland: How I Helped Lebron James Win a Championship and Save a City (2016)
