= Tiranga TV =

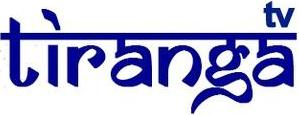
- Country: India
- Broadcast area: India
- Headquarters: Noida, Delhi-NCR

Programming
- Language(s): English
- Picture format: 16:9 (720p HDTV)

Ownership
- Owner: Veecon Media and Broadcasting Pvt Ltd
- Sister channels: Kaatyayani

History
- Launched: 26 January 2019; 6 years ago (as Harvest TV)
- Closed: 16 July 2019; 5 years ago

Links
- Website: www.tiranganews.in

Availability

Streaming media
- Tiranga TV Live: Watch Live

Tiranga TV was a short-lived Indian English language television news channel. It went on air on 26 January 2019 using Harvest TV name. It was broadcast by Veecon Media and Broadcasting Pvt Ltd which runs another channel named Kaatyayani too according to Ministry of Information and Broadcasting (India).

Since the election results on 23 May 2019, payments of the employees have been stopped and from 16 July 2019, it has stopped providing any live content and news management closure by September 2019.

Senior journalist Barkha Dutt has lambasted its promoter Kapil Sibal over non-payment of dues and acrimoniously firing its 200 employees without any notice or severance package.

== See also ==
- Media in India
- List of news channels in India
