= We the People (Indian TV series) =

- Presented by: Sarah Jacob
- Country of origin: India

Production
- Production location: New Delhi
- Running time: 39 to 40 minutes without commercials
- Production company: NDTV

Original release
- Network: NDTV 24x7
- Release: 2001 – present

We The People is a television talk show in India hosted by Sarah Jacob. The programme is broadcast every Sunday night at 8 pm on NDTV 24x7. It was originally hosted by Barkha Dutt.

== Show format ==
We the People is a debate show on current affairs. A six- to eight-person panel is invited for each discussion. A panel typically consists of politicians, social scientists, academicians, social workers and celebrities, depending on the topic. The live audience often poses questions directly to panelists and are occasionally asked for a snap poll to weigh in on an argument. The show encompasses a wide variety of topics and is not limited to political issues.

== Awards and accolades ==
We The People won the 14th Asian Television Award for Best Talk Show for the year 2008 and Best Talk Show (English) at the "NT Award 2000". Barkha was named "the most intelligent TV host" by Indian Television Awards, and also as Best Talk Show Anchor.

== List of episodes ==
=== 2001 ===
Date	Title	Topic
4 February	Gujarat earthquake: The aftershock	
21 October	The Indian Muslim voice	

=== 2005 ===
Date	Title	Topic
18 December	Sex change: Breaking free	
25 December	Divided by borders, united in grief	

=== 2006 ===
Date	Title	Topic
1 January	Best of 2005	
8 January	Do public figures have the right to private life?	
15 January	Should IIMs be allowed to go global?	
29 January	Is Chennai India's most conservative city?	
5 February	Demolition: Is the capital headed for chaos?	
26 February	Minority report: Will a religious survey harm the Indian Army?	
5 March	Will quotas in private schools make education more accessible?	
12 March	Is Islam's moderate voice silent?	
19 March	Should there be regulations for sting operations?	
26 March	Office of profit: Is the law irrational?	
2 April	Should we take beauty pageants seriously?	
10 April	Will the OBC quota create equality?	
16 April	Rape cases: Should we have stricter laws?	
30 April	Should the quota system be scrapped?	
14 May	Budhia: Are we helping or hurting him?	
21 May	Is religion hijacking creativity?	
4 June	Is celebrity activism meaningful?	
11 June	Is society to harsh with drug users?	
18 June	Indo-Pak debate: A generation gap?	
25 June	Is India's military still biased against women?	
2 July	Is 90 percent not enough for college admissions anymore?	
9 July	Are religious traditions fair to women?	
14 July	Mumbai blasts: Time to get tough on terrorism	
30 July	Does India really honour its soldiers?	
6 August	Cola row: Is there too much fuss over fizz?	
13 August	Is India still in awe of royalty?	
18 August	Have the rules of marriage changed?	
27 August	Should Vande Mataram be mandatory?	
10 September	Are teachers undervalued and underpaid?	
25 September	Is there any point in banning smoking in films?	
1 October	Gandhigiri: Is it realistic?	
22 October	The fight for gay rights	
29 October	Behind the veil	
5 November	Do media campaigns help or hurt justice?	
12 November	Medical tourism: Have hospitals become hotels?	
19 November	Do we need stricter alcohol laws?	
3 December	Godmen & Politics: Unholy alliance?	
3 December	Do spiritual leaders encourage blind faith?	
10 December	Freedom vs faith: Has India forced MF Husain into exile?	
17 December	Has the Afzal debate been politicised?	
31 December	Trapped by nature: India's sex change phenomena	

=== 2007 ===
Date	Title	Topic
7 January	Are Noida killings India's shame?	
14 January	Policing the internet: Possible or desirable?	
28 January	Have Indians lost faith in the judicial process?	
4 February	Death debate: Should euthanasia be legalised?	
12 February	Who should decide what we watch?	
25 February	Will Samjhauta blasts be a turning point in Indo-Pak relations?	
11 March	Do Indian women still need feminism?	
18 March	Is there a conflict between farms and WB factories?	
26 March	Will you go under the knife to look better?	
1 April	Is Team India being unfairly targeted?	
8 April	Muslims: Pushed into a stereotype?	
15 April	Flag & Anthem: Are Indians over-sensitive?	
22 April	Has tabloid journalism become a norm?	
30 April	Has judicial activism crossed the line?	
6 May	Does popular opinion sanction encounter killings?	
13 May	Has art been hijacked by moral police?	
19 May	Do temples have a right to restrict entry?	
20 May	Are extremists defining Sikh identity again?	
17 June	Is politics a man's world?	
24 June	Drugs: Why can't India say no?	
9 July	Are Indians obsessed with weight?	
22 July	Should it be legal to select the sex of your child?	
5 August	Is sympathy for Sanjay justified?	
12 August	Single Men = Good fathers?	
26 August	Is anti-Americanism outdated?	
2 September	Should the sex trade be legalised?	
16 September	Should faith influence government policy?	
23 September	Are sting operations unethical?	
29 September	Do people have the right to die with dignity?	
30 September	Indian Military Academy: Soldiering on	
7 October	Why is modern India intolerant?	
15 October	Can single men make good fathers?	
28 October	N-deal rollback: UPA's image hurt?	
11 November	Is the ban on child labour unrealistic?	
19 November	Nandigram: Can the CPM recover?	
25 November	Can creative freedom be absolute?	
9 December	Has Gujarat progressed under Modi?	

=== 2008 ===
Date	Title	Topic
13 January	Should blogs be regulated?	
20 January	Should politicians be considered for Bharat Ratna?	
27 January	Does India take its national symbols too seriously?	
3 February	Does India overplay the race card?	
10 February	Is 18 old enough for marriage?	
17 February	Pakistan: Democracy or dictatorship?	
2 March	Should history be determined by popular sentiment?	
9 March	Is India a fair field for men and women?	
16 March	Scarlett Keeling case: Goa's dark side?	
23 March	Would you go under the knife to look better?	
30 March	Will higher salaries for bureaucrats improve performance?	
6 April	Can politics and sports be kept separate?	
13 April	Will quotas create equity or end excellence?	
20 April	Can non-violence still be effective?	
27 April	Does materialism define the New India?	
4 May	Should smoking and drinking be banned on-screen?	
11 May	Do women need political reservation?	
18 May	Has India become indifferent to terror attacks?	
1 June	'Police'ing the media?	
15 June	Are India and America finally equal partners?	
22 June	Amitav Ghosh's sentiments behind Sea of Poppies	
3 August	Should the sex trade be legalised?	
10 August	Jammu & Kashmir: The siege within	
24 August	How should India deal with 'azaadi' demands?	
31 August	Mamata, a roadblock for Nano dream?	
7 September	Made-to-order babies?	
14 September	Not just skin-deep prejudice	
14 September	Is India losing the war against terror?	
21 September	Can SIMI and Bajrang Dal be equated?	
28 September	Why are Indians obsessed with fairness?	
5 October	Is it time to decriminalise homosexuality?	
12 October	Have the attacks on Christians destroyed India's image?	
19 October	Will the financial crisis change India's attitude to money?	
26 October	Is India's city of dreams getting destroyed by regionalism?	
2 November	Obama or McCain: Who is better for India?	
9 November	Can India's political establishment create an Obama like inspiration?	
16 November	'Hindu' terror: Myth or fact?	
23 November	Is the Indian dream in danger after the global financial crisis?	
30 November	Enough is enough: India's 9/11	
7 December	Anger into action: What can India do next?	
14 December	Anatomy of anger	
21 December	Has the Minority Affairs Minister embarrassed India's Muslims?	
28 December	J&K verdict: End of separatism?	

=== 2009 ===
Date	Title	Topic
11 January	No war, no peace: India's Pakistan problem?	
18 January	Should Satyam be saved?	
25 January	The Slumdog phenomenon	
2 February	Is peace possible between India and Pakistan?	
8 February	The Advertising debate	
15 February	The culture wars	
1 March	Jai Ho: From Dharavi to LA and back	
8 March	Should IPL and elections be held together?	
15 March	Regional parties: The Kings makers?	
22 March	Death, love, life on TV	
29 March	New middle-class political activism	
6 April	Politics in the age of TV	
12 April	Small parties: big ambitions	
19 April	Should godmen stay out of politics?	
26 April	How safe are our schools and colleges?	
3 May	Who's afraid of Mayawati?	
10 May	Who is India's Obama?	
24 May	Will Indian polity get a younger soul?	
31 May	Ragging: From tradition to abuse	
7 June	Racism: Indians as targets	
14 June	Women and Affirmative Action	
21 June	Royalty in the age of democracy	
28 June	One nation, one Board: Is India ready?	
5 July	The right to be gay	
12 July	Royalty and Indian politics	
2 August	Right to motherhood	
16 August	Has India over-reacted to the swine-flu?	
23 August	Political parties scared of history?	
30 August	Religious symbols in a secular society	
6 September	Is politics killing history and literature?	
13 September	Austerity, Congress style?	
20 September	Should everyone in India know Hindi?	
27 September	Women in Army: Time for a greater role?	
4 October	Gandhi's legacy: Are we too politically correct?	
11 October	Is Mumbai no longer cosmopolitan?	
25 October	The Maoist Muddle	
25 October	Is a peace initiative with the Maoists possible	
1 November	The Indira Gandhi legacy	
8 November	Vande Mataram and Fatwa politics	
15 November	National language: What's that?	
22 November	26/11: Lessons learnt?	
6 December	India's skin deep prejudice	
13 December	Nation vs regionalism	
20 December	Private lives, public gaze	
27 December	Ruchika's case: Mockery of justice?	

=== 2010 ===
Date	Title	Topic
3 January	Best of We The People 2009	
10 January	Is India soft on sexual misconduct?	Rape in India
17 January	Get a picture or save a life?	
24 January	Is TV exploiting young children?	
31 January	Mukesh Ambani, Montek at LSE debate	
7 February	Mumbai and the idea of India	
28 February	MF Husain: Let down by India?	
7 March	Being Muslim in today's India?	
14 March	Re-branding Modi?	
28 March	"Salaam Namaste" to pre-marital sex?	
4 April	Right to education: Quantity over quality?	
11 April	Maoists vs the state	
18 April	IPL: Indian Political League	
16 May	Is globalisation a bad word?	
23 May	Young politicians, old ideas?	
30 May	India's maoist challenge	
6 June	The death penalty debate	
20 June	Is Twitter here to stay?	
27 June	Office relationships: Harassment or consensual?	
4 July	Government vs Army on the Armed Forces Act?	
11 July	India's population: Boon or bane?	
18 July	The language wars	
25 July	Surrogacy: Exploiting the poor?	
1 August	Commonwealth games: National shame?	
8 August	India: The Twitter republic	
15 August	Superbug: Bias against India?	New Delhi metallo-beta-lactamase 1
22 August	Is the 'real India' forgotten?	
12 September	Pension for ex-Army men: A question of equality?	
19 September	Ayodhya verdict: Time for closure?	
26 September	Ayodhya: Is 'reconciliation' realistic?	
24 October	India: Game for corruption?	
31 October	Alimony and the modern woman	
14 November	Is corruption in our roots?	
21 November	Government show who is "The Big Boss"?	
28 November	The new-age neta	
5 December	The art of giving	
19 December	Will WikiLeaks change diplomacy world over?	
26 December	Binayak Sen: Targeted by the state?	

=== 2011 ===
Date	Title	Topic
2 January	Best of We The People 2010	
16 January	Does India care for its soldiers?	
23 January	Will books survive the digital age?	Jaipur Literature Festival
26 January	Army: Overused, under-appreciated?	
30 January	Endgame in sight for 'Afghan-Pak' crisis?	
20 February	Is the India story endangered by scams?	
27 February	Is capital punishment deterrent for rapists?	
13 March	The euthanasia debate	
27 March	Ticket to India-Pakistan thaw?	
10 April	The Tamil Nadu poll blockbuster	
17 April	Being gay: The parents' story	
24 April	The anatomy of a bribe	
1 May	Maharaja in royal mess	
15 May	Land wars: Farmers' rights vs industrialisation	
22 May	Homecoming possible for pandits in J&K?	
29 May	Women and power: Bucking the trend?	
12 June	Army an option for Indian youth?	
26 June	Viewer's choice: We the People on Gujarat quake	
3 July	Neeraj Grover's parents on their son's murder	
10 July	Does India need a separate prevention of communal violence bill?	
17 July	Has Mumbai been numbed by terror?	
24 July	Has spirituality turned into a profit industry?	
31 July	Corruption kills the growth story?	
11 August	Indian cinema: Hijacked by politics?	
15 August	Fasting for change- Satyagraha or theatre?	
21 August	Anna and the great Indian middle class	
28 August	Anna's movement: The challenges & lessons	
4 September	Copycat politics over mercy pleas?	
11 September	Has India been numbed by terror?	
25 September	Can you live on just ₹ 32 a day?	
2 October	Gandhigiri in the age of violence	
9 October	Telangan: An idea whose time has come?	
16 October	Mayawati's Park: Extravaganza or empowerment?	
23 October	Will right to recall make politicians accountable?	
30 October	Does the army still need special powers in J&K?	
6 November	Is social media changing human equations?	
13 November	Love, sex and cinema	
20 November	Terror errors: Weakening India's fight?	
27 November	From argumentative India to intolerant India?	
4 December	Has Parliament become a house of Adjournments?	
11 December	The return of Anna Hazare	
18 December	From Uphaar AMRI, is it a license to kill?	

=== 2012 ===
Date	Title	Topic
1 January	Democracy's midnight mayhem	
15 January	Why does India still not have a national military memorial?	Indian Armed Forces
12 February	Age row: Ceasefire or lost battle?	
18 February	Minority welfare or maximum politics?	
26 February	The state in your bedroom?	Section 377 of the Indian Penal Code
8 March	Women's day: Substance or symbolism?	International Women's Day
18 March	India: No country for working women?	Women in India
25 March	Pornography or erotica: Who decides?	
1 April	After the ceasefire: Lessons learnt?	
15 April	Should the state negotiate with hostage takers?	
22 April	Surrogacy: Outsourcing childbirth?	Commercial surrogacy in India
29 April	Rajya Sabha: House of Elders now House of Glamour?	Rajya Sabha members
6 May	Siachen: Time for a thaw?	Siachen conflict
7 May	Hillary Clinton on FDI, Mamata, Hafiz Saeed and outsourcing (special episode)	
13 May	Are single sex institutions outdated?	
3 June	The subsidies debate: Pro aam-aadmi or anti-growth?	Subsidies in India
10 June	'Bond'-ing doctors into duty?	
17 June	The politics of minority quotas	Reservation in India
24 June	India: The big bazaar of organ trade?	Organ trade in India
1 July	President's pardon: The clemency debate	Pratibha Patil communes death sentences
8 July	Hitting cancer for a six	Interview with Yuvraj Singh
29 July	Mayhem at Manesar	Manesar violence July 2012
5 August	Sedition laws: Essential or archaic?	Sedition laws in India
12 August	India's steel frame: Still standing strong?	
19 August	We the Olympians: A distant dream or within reach now?	India at the 2012 Summer Olympics
26 August	Is the government caught in a censorship web?	
2 September	Riots and the rule of law	
9 September	India-Pakistan: Prisoners of hostility?	
16 September	Cellphone towers: India's safety check	
23 September	Clinical trials: The India report	
7 October	Euthanasia: Mercy killing or murder?	Euthanasia in India
11 November	Are religious traditions tilted against women?	Role of women in religion
18 November	Should the state fund political parties?	
25 November	Internet freedom: In danger of being stifled?	
2 December	Politics and the 'Great' Indian middle class	
9 December	Time to re-think capital punishment?	Capital punishment in India
16 December	Moditva: Lessons for India?	
23 December	Will capital punishment be a deterrent to rapists?	2012 Delhi gang rape case

=== 2013 ===
Date	Title	Topic
1 January	Best of We The People 2012	
6 January	Every woman's battle: The enemy within	Rape in India
13 January	Cinema: A cult or misogyny	Objectification of women in Indian cinema
20 January	Judiciary: symbol of hope and change for women?	Low conviction rate in rape cases in India

=== 2020 ===
Date	Title	Topic	Note
15 March	India Fights Coronavirus	COVID-19 pandemic in India	First edition without an audience due to the 2019–20 coronavirus pandemic.
22 March	How India Fought Back Against Coronavirus	The Janata Curfew	
29 March	Let Down by Lockdown?	COVID-19 lockdown in India	
