= Asawari Joshi =

Indian actress

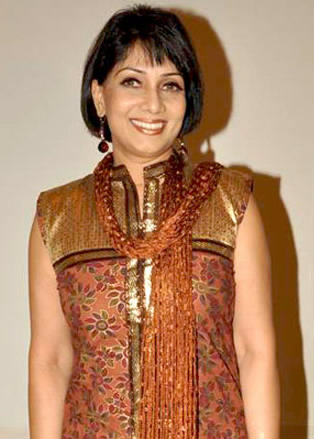
- Asawari Joshi in 2011
- Born: Asawari Joshi; 6 May 1965 (age 61); Mumbai, India
- Occupation: Actress
- Years active: 1986–present
- Website: https://www.asawarijoshi.co.in/

Asawari Joshi is an Indian actress. She has acted in many Marathi language films and serials. She is known for her role in the Hindi TV series, Office Office. She has acted as Lovely Kapoor in film Om Shanti Om. She is also known for her role in the Hindi serial Shake iT Up aired on Disney Channel, which is the Indian version of American show Shake It Up.

== Politics ==
Asawari Joshi joined Congress Party in 2021. One year later, she joined Nationalist Congress Party (NCP) in April 2022.

== Filmography ==
=== Films ===
Year	Title	Role	Language
1986	Mazhe Ghar Mazha Sansar	Suman	Marathi
1989	Ek Ratra Mantarleli	Surekha	Marathi
1989	Dhaam Dhoom		Marathi
1991	Godi Gulabi		Marathi
1993	Ghayaal	Balram's Wife	Marathi
1995	Sukhi Sansarachi 12 Sutre	Daughter-in-law	Marathi
1995	Hum Dono	Rajesh's Mother	Hindi
1996	Bal Brahmachari		Hindi
1999	Ladhaai	Madhumati More	Marathi
2001	Pyaar Zindagi Hai	Geeta	Hindi
2005	Waqt: The Race Against Time	Ashalata	Hindi
2005	Davbindu	Sarika Dixit	Marathi
2006	Manthan: Ek Amrut Pyala	Employee	Marathi
2007	Hattrick	Priya Patel	Hindi
2007	Om Shanti Om	Lovely Kapoor	Hindi
2008	Tandala	Sonsala	Marathi
2008	Kismat Konnection	Raj's Mother	Hindi
2010	Hum Tum Aur Ghost	Mrs. Kapoor	Hindi
2010	Hello Darling	Tanya	Hindi
2014	Samarthya		Marathi
2014	Double Seat	Chakuli Mami, Guest Appearance	Marathi
2015	Mumbai-Pune-Mumbai 2	Niraja	Marathi
2016	Cheater	Bob's Wife	Marathi
2016	My Father's Name Was Garbage	Anusaya	Marathi
2017	Kis Kiss Ka Kissa	Sumitra	Hindi
2017	Bhavishyachi Aishi Taishi	Megha's Sister	Marathi
2019	66 Sadashiv	Small Role	Marathi
2019	Jawani Zindabad	Aai	Marathi

=== Television ===
Year	Title	Role	Notes
1993	Zabaan Sambhalke	Kanya Kumari	Guest Appearance
1998	Tere Ghar Ke Samne	Sushmita Deshpande	Hindi Sitcom
1999	Family No.1	Shalini	
2001–2004	Office Office	Usha	
2006	Naya Office Office	Usha	
2012	Eka Lagnachi Dusri Goshta	Ulka	Marathi series
2012–2013	Mala Sasu Havi	Gayatri Ratnaparkhi	Marathi series
2013	Majhe Man Tujhe Zale	Jaymala Desai	Marathi series
2013	Shake It Up	S.P. Kiran Walia	
2016–2017	Jamai Raja	Gangu Sawant	
2017	Chukbhul Dyavi Ghyavi	Manu	Marathi series, Guest appearance
2017	Shankar Jaikishan 3 in 1	Savitri	
2018	Weekends	Kevin's Mother	
2018	Laal Ishq	Episodic Role	
2019	Internet Wala Love	Sushma Kumar	
2021–2023	Swabhiman – Shodh Astitvacha	Prof. Aditi Suryavanshi	Marathi series
2021	Mulgi Zali Ho	Prof. Aditi Suryavanshi	Guest appearance
2022	Thipkyanchi Rangoli	Prof. Aditi Suryavanshi	Guest appearance
2026–present	Shubh Shravani	Alaknanda	Marathi series
