= Office Office =

Indian sitcom

- Genre: Sitcom; Satire
- Written by: Ashwni Dhir
- Directed by: Rajiv Mehra

Production
- Editor: Manish Jaitly
- Camera setup: Multi-camera
- Running time: Approx. 24 minutes

Original release
- Network: SAB TV
- Release: 3 September 2001

Related
- Naya Office Office

Office Office is an Indian Hindi language satirical comedy television series. It consists of short stories and focuses on government and other offices in corrupt situations. It premiered on SAB TV on 3 September 2001. The show was a satirical take on prevalent corruption in India.

== Cast ==
- Pankaj Kapur as Musaddilal
- Manoj Pahwa as Bhatia
- Deven Bhojani as Patel
- Asawari Joshi as Usha
- Sanjay Mishra as Shukla
- Hemant Pandey as Pandey
- Vrajesh Hirjee as Patel (Season 2)
- Eva Grover as Tina Sharma

== Production ==
The filming took place at Gemini studios and Kamalistan studio in Mumbai.

== Reception ==
This show received positive responses for its storyline and won the 'Best Comedy' award at the 'RAPA Awards' in 2001 and 2002.

== Sequels and film adaptation ==
A follow-up series to Office Office, Naya Office Office launched on Star One in 2007. A comic book series based on the show was also launched. The books were published by Prakash Books.

A film based on the series titled Chala Mussaddi... Office Office was released on 5 August 2011 and received mostly negative reviews from critics.

A sequel and spin-off series titled Office Office: Chali Mussaddi Ki Beti aired on DD National in 2026. Shruti Sharma played the role of Anokhi Lal Mussaddi, daughter of Mussaddi Lal.
