= Lilliput (actor) =

Indian actor and writer (born 1950)

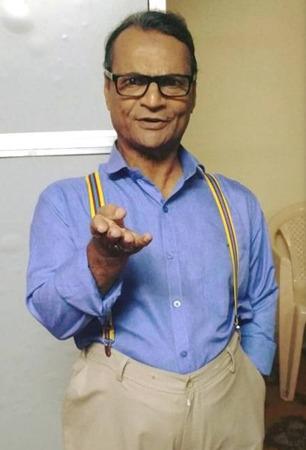
- Born: M. M. Faruqui; 3 October 1950 (age 76); Gaya, Bihar, India
- Occupation: Actor
- Years active: 1980–present
- Height: 4 ft 7 in (1.40 m)
- Spouse: Sulekha
- Children: 2

M. M. Faruqui, known professionally as Lilliput, is an Indian actor and writer, known for the TV series Vikram Vetaal and Bollywood films. He adopted his screen name taking a cue from Lilliput and Blefuscu, two island nations in Jonathan Swift's novel Gulliver's Travels where Gulliver lands onto an island inhabited by little people.

== Career ==
He is best known for writing Doordarshan's popular science fiction series Indradhanush and acted in films such as Bunty Aur Babli (2005), Saagar (1985), and popular 90s sitcoms like Dekh Bhai Dekh, Natkht and Mr. Funtoos, and for starring in Woh (1998) as Woh. He has written the dialogues of critically acclaimed movie Chamatkar (1992). He plays Dadda Tyagi in popular TV series Mirzapur from season 2. He made his Tamil film debut in Vijay starrer Beast.

== Filmography ==
Key
†	Denotes films that have not yet been released

=== Film ===
Year	Title	Role	Notes
1985	Saagar	Cheena	Hindi film debut
1987	Hukumat	Bhimsen, Servant	
1988	Woh Phir Aayegi	Girls Hostel Peon	
1990	Swarg	Crippled Beggar on the Street	
1992	Chamatkar	Writer, Dialogues	
1993	Zakhmo Ka Hisaab	Mama	
1998	Aunty No. 1	Servant	
2001	Style	Receptionist	
2002	Shararat	Prisoner in a jail	
2005	Bunty Aur Babli	Band Trumpet Player	
2010	Prem Kaa Game	Dr. Screwvala	
2018	When Obama Loved Osama		
2020	Kaamyaab	Himself	
2020	Ram Singh Charlie	Short	
2022	Beast	Umar Farooq	Tamil film debut
2022	Anth The End		
2023	Acting Ka Bhoot	Kabir Rana	
2025	Gustaakh Ishq	Faruqui	

=== Television ===
Year	Title	Role	Notes
1985–1998	Idhar Udhar	Sudhir	
1985–1986	Vikram Aur Betaal	Various characters	
1993	Dekh Bhai Dekh	Various characters	
1996	Natkhat	Bandit	
1996–1997	Zabaan Sambhalke	Sheikh	
1998	Woh	Woh (Vikram)	
1999	Star Bestsellers	Mr. Sinha	
2002	Shararat	Television Director	
2009	Shaurya Aur Suhani	Bhasundi	
2010–2016	Adaalat	Brijesh Kumar (Babloo Joker) / Peter Fernandes	
2012	Luck Luck Ki Baat		Television film
2013	Gutur Gu 2	K K's uncle	
2013	Raavi	Kaaleshwar	
2013,2014	Hum Ne Li Hai... Shapath	Various Characters	
2015	Razia Sultan	Maalik	
2016	Bhabiji Ghar Par Hain!	Mamulal Chaurasiya	Episode 458-460
2019–2020	Vidya	School Principal Manohar Mishra	
2020–2024	Mirzapur	Dadda Tyagi	
2026	Vashikaranam – Kis Par Rakhein Vishwas		
