= Idhar Udhar =

- Directed by: Anand Mahendroo
- Starring: Ratna Pathak; Supriya Pathak
- Country of origin: India
- Original language: Hindi
- No. of seasons: 2
- No. of episodes: 34

Production
- Running time: 22 minutes

Original release
- Network: DD National
- Release: 1985 – 1998

Idhar Udhar is a Hindi sitcom which first aired on Doordarshan in 1985. It was directed by Anand Mahendroo and produced by Shobha Doctor. It starred real-life sisters Ratna Pathak and Supriya Pathak. Its first season was taken off the air after 12 episodes.

The show was heavily inspired by Three's Company.

In December 1997, owing to the success of Dekh Bhai Dekh, Anand Mahendroo launched a sequel to the series under the banner of Advance Entertainment Network Ltd. with the original star cast of both Pathak sisters and Liliput, along with Bhavana Balsavar.

== Plot ==
=== Season 1 (1985) ===
The story revolves around the lives of Sunita (Ratna Pathak), an air hostess and Poonam (Supriya Pathak), an ad executive. They stay together as paying guests in a flat in Mumbai. Their lives take an interesting turn when they end up sharing their flat with Kumar Bhairav (Ravi Baswani), a struggling actor and Sudhir (M.M. Faruqui (Lilliput)), a small-time broker.

Season 1 focuses on all the problems and joys they experience living in the same house.

=== Season 2 (1998) ===
13 years later, Sunita (Ratna Pathak) and Poonam (Supriya Pathak / Lillete Dubey) return to Mumbai and end up sharing the same apartment exactly the way they used to. They are allotted the same apartment by their old friend Sudhir's (Liliput) mischievous adopted sons Jai and Harsh. Sudhir is now a filthy rich builder and married to his ex-secretary Katie (Bhavana Balsavar).

Season 2 peeks into the lives of Sunita, Poonam, Sudhir, Katie and their kids.

== Cast ==
Season 1

- Ratna Pathak as Sunita
- Supriya Pathak as Poonam
- Lilliput as Sudhir
- Ravi Baswani as Kumar Bhairav(alias)/Asif Mohammad Khan (real name)/Ronnie Gonsalves(imposter)
- Shammi as Mrs. Bregenza
- Dina Pathak as Poonam's grandmother
- Nisha Singh as Shabnam, Asif's love interest
- Guddi Maruti as Shabnam, Sunita's friend
- Tom Alter as Ronnie Gonsalves(real)
- Deepak Tijori as Susheel, a stranger in episode 8

Season 2

- Ajay Padhye / Rakesh Paul as Harsh
- Aditya Kapadia as Akhil
- Abhishek Sharma as Atul
- Shruti Sharma as Himani
- Tanvi Bhatia as Shivani
- Bhavana Balsavar as Katie
- Ananya Khare as Mary
- Parvin Dabas as Vishal, Poonam's husband
- Amita Nangia as Kiran
- Viju Khote
- Prabhat Bhattacharya as Jai
- Paintal
- Anita Hassanandani as Anushka
