= KK Goswami =

Indian television actor (born 1973)

K K Goswami
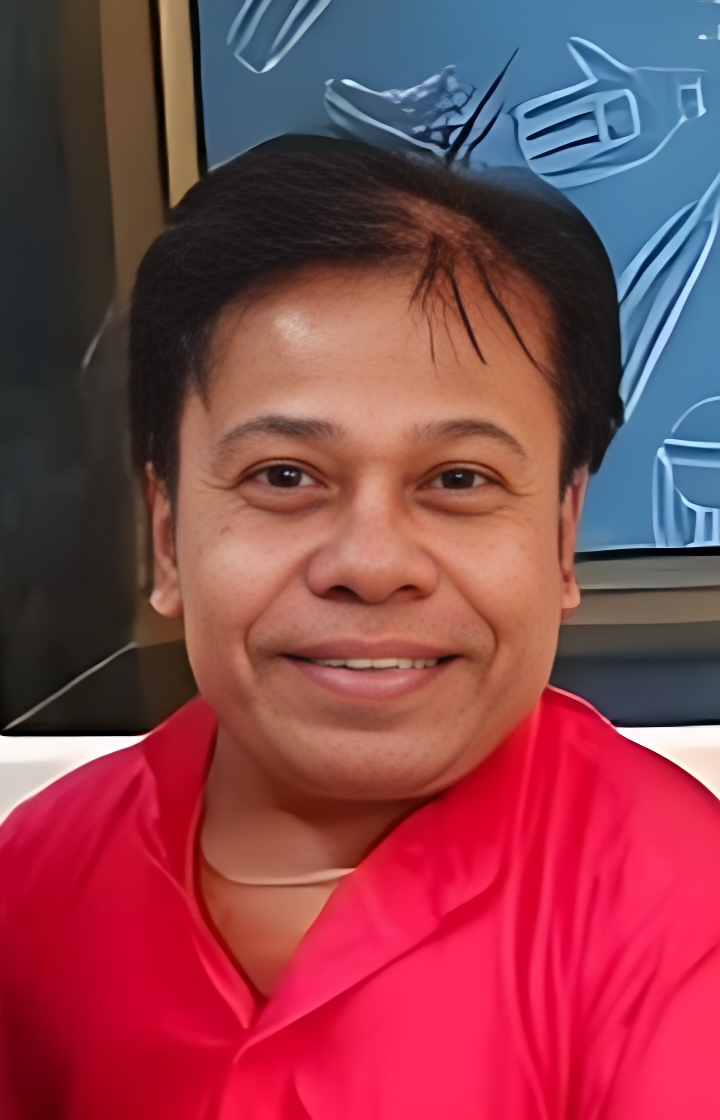
- Goswami in 2022
- Born: Krishnakant Goswami; 3 September 1973 (age 52); Muzaffarpur, Bihar, India
- Occupation: Actor
- Years active: 1997–present
- Height: 1.15 m (3 ft 9 in)
- Spouse: Pinku Goswami
- Children: 2

Krishnakant (K K) Goswami is an Indian television and film actor who appears in Hindi, Gujarati, Marathi, Bengali, Bhojpuri films and serials. He is one of the shortest actors of India.

== Career ==
Goswami began his career in Junior-G as supportive villain, followed by a leading role in Vikraal Aur Gabraal as Gabroo/Gabraal. Goswami continued playing the role of Gabroo in Star Plus's Ssshhhh...Koi Hai, Ssshhhh...Phir Koi Hai. Later, Goswami played the role of Khali Bali in the daily show Shaktiman and Pappu Maharaj the Chief in Gutur Gu.

== Filmography ==
=== Films ===
Year	Film	Role	Notes
2006	Bhoot Unkle	Tingu	
2007	Aur Pappu Paas Ho Gaya		
2020	Ram Singh Charlie	Cut	

=== Television ===
Year	Series	Role	Notes
1997	Shaktimaan	Khalli/ Balli	Double role
2001–2003	Junior G	Bonapart	
2002–2004	Shaka Laka Boom Boom	Crystal	
2002–2003	Aryamaan – Brahmaand Ka Yodha	Various characters	
2002–2004	Ssshhhh...Koi Hai	Gabroo (Gabraal)	
2003–2004	Vikraal Aur Gabraal	Gabroo (Gabraal)	spin-off series of Ssshhhh...Koi Hai
2003–2006	Shararat	Phullu	
2004	Majooba ka Ajooba	Bagdam Buta	
2005	Akkad Bakkad Bambey Bo	Gappu's nephew	
2007–2008	Ssshhhh...Phir Koi Hai	Goh	
2009	F.I.R.	ACP Action Pandey	
2010–2013	Gutur Gu	Pappu Maharaj	
2013–2018; 2024	C. I. D.	Dhenchu	
2015	Chakravartin Ashoka Samrat	Varahmir	
2015–2017	Sankatmochan Mahabali Hanuman	Atibal	
2016–2017	Bhabhi Ji Ghar Par Hai!	Various characters	
2017	Trideviyaan	Missile Thief	

== See also ==
- List of Bhojpuri actors
