= Hum Sab Baraati =

Indian sitcom series

- Directed by: Sanjay Chhel and Dharmesh Mehta
- Starring: see below
- Opening theme: "Hum Sab Baraati" by Sanjivani, Vinod Rathod and Madhushree
- Country of origin: India
- Original language: Hindi
- No. of seasons: 1
- No. of episodes: 79

Production
- Producer: Sanjay Chhel
- Editor: Jay B Ghadiali
- Running time: 23 minutes

Original release
- Network: Zee TV
- Release: 4 April 2004

Hum Sab Baraati is an Indian television Hindi language sitcom, which debuted 4 April 2004 on Zee TV. The comedy series was produced by Sanjay Chhel, who directed and wrote the script for Hum Sab Baraati. It has won numerous awards, including the award for "Promo for a Sitcom" at the Indian Telly Awards in 2004.

== Overview ==
The theme focuses on a family that specialises in arranging weddings — from selecting the venue to entertaining the guests. Each member of this family specialises in a particular task.

== Cast ==
- Dinyar Contractor as Vrindavan Mehta
- Sulabha Arya as Kanta Ben Mehta
- Bhavana Balsavar as Bhanu
- Tiku Talsania as Chandu Mehta
- Amit Divatia as Maganlal Shah
- Dilip Joshi as Nathu Mehta
- Delnaaz Irani as Harsha
- Shweta Gautam as Chinmai/Chini Mini
- Munmun Dutta as Mithi Bhouji
- Sharmilee Raj as Ms. Khanna
- Atul Parchure as Durlav
- Rita Bhaduri as Mayalaxmi
- Raju Kher as Baswani
- Mehul Buch as Laloo
- Viju Khote as Kuber (Bhikhari)
- Sharad Vyas as Mr. Desai
