= 2612 =

- Genre: Fiction; Suspense Thriller
- Created by: Life OK
- Written by: Saurabh Shukla
- Directed by: Siddharth Sengupta; Swapnil Mahaling
- Starring: See Below
- Composer: Raju Singh
- Country of origin: India
- Original language: Hindi
- No. of seasons: 2
- No. of episodes: 87

Production
- Cinematography: Sanjay K. Memane; Anil Katke
- Camera setup: Multi-camera
- Running time: 30 minutes
- Production company: Sphere Origins

Original release
- Network: Life OK
- Release: 26 November 2012 – 31 May 2013

2612 is a television show that revolves around the planning of a terror plot. The story revolves around two characters – Shahana, a strong-willed woman whose aim is to make the 2612 mission a success and Rashmi, a simple kindergarten teacher, who unknowingly gets drawn into this plot. Randeep is the special task force agent who aids Rashmi in her endeavour to thwart the 2612 plot. The show was launched on 26 November 2012 and aired on Life OK on Monday through Friday evenings. The sequel, 2613 began airing on airing on 25 March 2013 on Life OK.

== Cast ==
- Shikha Singh as Shahana Rasin Malik / Karuna Shekhawat
- Cabir Maira as Jidda / Anand Swami
- Tejaswi Prakash Wayangankar as Rashmi Raju Bhargava
- Maninder Singh as Randeep Rathore
- Alan Kapoor as Nishant
- Addite Malik as Malti Rakesh Bhargava
- Pratham Shah as Mithoo Rakesh Bhargava
- Aparajita Bajaj as Ritika Shantanu Sardesai / Meher
- Sameer Sharma as Shantanu Sardesai
- Nihar Thakkar as Rakesh Raju Bhargava
- Raju Kher as Raju Bhargava
- Drisha Kalyani as Suchi Shantanu Sardesai
- Rushad Rana as Rasin Malik
- Shaikh Sami as Senior Malik
- Pankaj Jha as Mastana
- Meenakshi Arya as Rinky
