= Silent comedy =

Genre of silent film

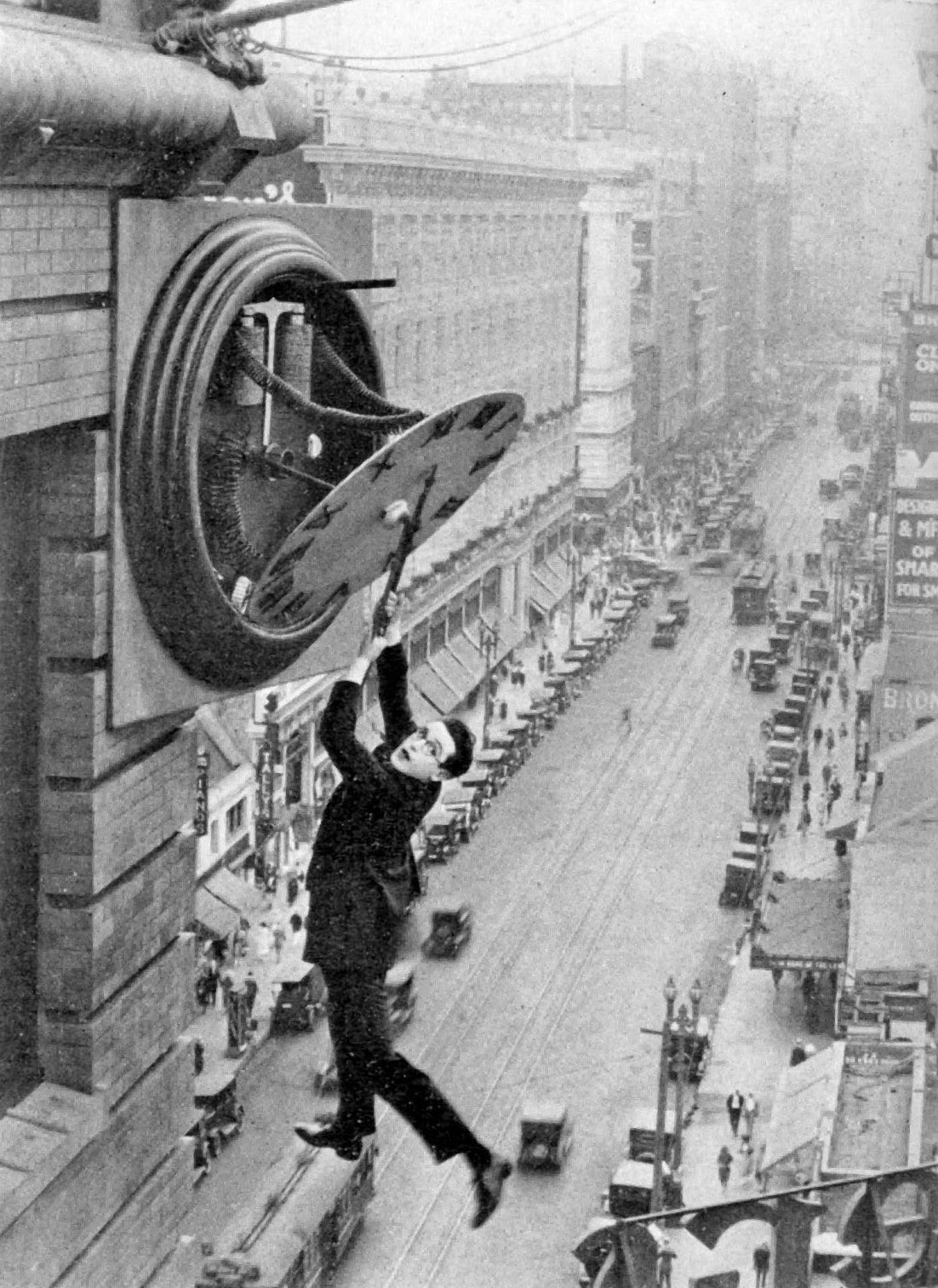
Harold Lloyd in Safety Last! (1923)

Silent comedy is a style of film, related to but distinct from mime, developed to bring comedy into the medium of film during the silent film era (1900s–1920s), before synchronized soundtracks that could include dialogue were technologically available for the majority of films. While silent comedy is still practiced today, albeit much less frequently, it has significantly influenced modern comedic media.

Many techniques used in silent comedy were borrowed from vaudeville traditions, with many silent comedy stars, such as Buster Keaton and Charlie Chaplin, getting their start in vaudeville. Silent comedies often place a strong emphasis on visual and physical humor, frequently utilizing "sight gags" to convey stories and entertain audiences. These gags often involved exaggerated forms of violence, a style that became known as "slapstick". Classic examples of slapstick comedy devices include the "pratfall," slipping on a banana peel, getting soaked with water, and having a pie thrown in one's face.

== Silent film era ==
=== Beginnings–1913 ===
The first silent comedy film is generally regarded as L'Arroseur Arrosé, directed and produced by Louis Lumière. Shown to the public on June 10, 1895, the film ran for 49 seconds and featured a gardener being sprayed in the face with a hose. Most likely based on a popular comic strip of the time, L'Arroseur Arrosé created a new genre and inspired its audiences.

As film transitioned from a novelty medium, initially focused on capturing exotic locations and everyday actions, into an established industry in the early 1900s, filmmakers began to tell fictional stories, written and shot in studios. Before 1902, these films typically ran no longer than a couple of minutes and consisted of a single shot. By 1902, filmmakers such as Georges Méliès began producing films closer to one reel in length (about 10 minutes of runtime), utilizing multiple shots. During this period, comedy emerged as a genre of its own.

The first international silent comedy star was Max Linder, a French comedian who worked for the Pathé Film Company.[4] His character, a mustachioed, top hat-wearing, high-class gentleman, excelled in taking simple scenarios and everyday tasks and turning them into chaotic events. His style of comedy was widely imitated by the silent comedians who followed in his footsteps.

Intertitles in silent films almost always served the purpose of introducing characters and setting. They also frequently conveyed dialogue. Occasionally, these intertitles included illustrations, though they were most often black with white text. Conversation could also be depicted through body language and mouthing, allowing actors to convey meaning without spoken words.

Color silent films are quite rare, as affordable color film was not invented until the late 1930s. As a result, the vast majority of silent comedies are in black and white. One notable exception is Seven Chances, which features opening scenes filmed in early Technicolor.

=== 1913–1927 ===
Hal Roach and Mack Sennett were two of the most renowned producers of silent comedies. Famous actors and comedic teams from this era have since become legendary figures: Ben Turpin, Keystone Cops, Mabel Normand, Edna Purviance, Roscoe "Fatty" Arbuckle, Charlie Chaplin, Buster Keaton, Harold Lloyd, Larry Semon, Harry Langdon, Charley Chase, Laurel and Hardy (who successfully transitioned into talking pictures), among many others. These actors and producers helped shape the golden age of silent comedy, leaving a lasting impact on the genre.

== Modern era ==
In the early years of "talkie" films (beginning in 1927, with The Jazz Singer), a few actors continued to perform silently for comedic effect. Most famously, Charlie Chaplin maintained his silent style in the sound era, with his last great "silent" comedies, City Lights (1931) and Modern Times (1936), both made after sound films had become the standard. Another notable example was Harpo Marx, who always portrayed a mute in the Marx Brothers' films. An early television series that featured exaggerated visual humor was The Ernie Kovacs Show.

An important legacy of silent film comedy can be seen in the humor of animated cartoons. While live-action comedy moved toward a focus on verbal humor, such as the witty exchanges of Abbott and Costello and Groucho Marx, animated cartoons embraced the full range of slapstick gags, frenetic chase scenes, visual puns, and exaggerated facial expressions characteristic of silent comedies. These elements were especially prominent in the Looney Tunes and Merrie Melodies cartoons from Warner Bros., directed by Bob Clampett, Chuck Jones and Friz Freleng, as well as in the Pluto cartoons from Disney, directed by Clyde Geronimi and Charles August Nichols, the MGM cartoons of Tex Avery, the Tom and Jerry cartoons by William Hanna and Joseph Barbera, and of Harman and Ising.

During the 1960s and 1970s, several films paid homage to or referenced the silent era of film comedy. It's a Mad, Mad, Mad, Mad World featured performers and gags from the era, while Blake Edwards' The Great Race and Mel Brooks' Silent Movie were full-length tributes. Peter Bogdanovich's What's Up, Doc? also included slapstick gags and Keystone-style chase scenes, ideas that prefigured much of the humor later seen in films like The Blues Brothers and Airplane!.

An episode of The Brady Bunch featured the family creating a silent comedy filled with pie-throwing antics.

Few feature films today fully exploit the genre of silent comedy. However, some comedy teams still use a silent character for comedic effect, with the most consistent—and most famous—being Teller from Penn & Teller.

Rowan Atkinson achieved huge success in the 1990s with his mostly silent character Mr. Bean.

In a 1999 episode of Frasier, "Three Valentines", David Hyde Pierce, who portrayed Niles Crane, performed a five-minute silent sketch at the start of the episode.

The British stop motion animated children's series Shaun the Sheep also utilizes silent comedy.

Although fewer feature films directly employ silent comedy, its techniques continue to influence modern comedies, mainly through the development of slapstick and artistic references to the iconic gags of famous silent comedians. In 2010, India’s first silent comedy series, Gutur Gu, premiered on Sony SAB and became a hit.
