= Pyar Kare Dis: Feel the Power of Love =

Pyar Kare Dis: Feel The Power of Love
- Directed by: Kamal Nathani
- Produced by: M. Harwani
- Starring: Menaka Lalwani; Prakash Ramchandani; Vishal Watwani; Jiten Lalwani; Seema Motwani; Neeru Asrani; Jaya Asrani
- Edited by: Gopal Raghani
- Music by: Ghansham Vaswani
- Production company: Sunico Films
- Release date: September 2007
- Country: India
- Language: Sindhi

Pyar Kare Dis: Feel The Power of Love is a 2007 Indian Sindhi-language romantic drama film, directed by Kamal Nathani and produced by M. Harwani. The film was produced by Sunico Films, which also produced the Bollywood film Pyar Ka Tarana. Pyar Kare Dis was released in cinemas and online on 14 September 2007.

== Synopsis ==
Puja, daughter of a businessman Ram Mata based in New York City, is excited when she learns news about wedding of her cousin Sunder, scheduled in a month's time at Pune, India. She immediately decides to visit India, the country of her origin. On her way from Mumbai to Pune, she meets and falls in love with Dev.

At home, she notices aunty Padma dominating the household and her uncle Murli's home is messy. Dadi, who is not keeping well, is being ignored. Her cousin Sangita is not allowed to do anything on her own. She has to take permission of her mother for everything. Murli does not want any tension in the house so he does not interfere. Every member of the family including Sunder, has surrendered to the whirs and fancies of Padma.

With preparations for Sunder's wedding in full swing, Puja begins to take things in her own hands. Twist in the tale comes with revelation that Sunder is not happy with the marriage as he is in love with a Christian girl Rosy.

Puja decides to fix the problem with the help of Dev. She meets Sunder's fiancé and tells her about Rosy. All hell breaks loose, when news comes from Sunder's future in-laws that they have decided to break the ties. Puja and Sunder come under attack from Padma. Following a major showdown, Sunder leaves home in anger. Puja is shocked at these happenings.

== Cast ==
- Menaka Lalwani as Puja, daughter of Ram Mata
- Jiten Lalwani as Dev
- Prakash Ramchandani as Ram Mata, a businessman based in New York City
- Vishal Watwani as Sunder, Puja's cousin
- Seema Motwani as Padma, Puja's aunt
- Neeru Asrani as Murli, Puja's uncle
- Jaya Asrani as Dadi, Puja's grandmother
- Gunjan Thawrani as Sangita
- Mehak Bhatia as Rosy
- Preeti Jhangiani in an item number

== Soundtrack ==
The film's music was composed by Ghansham Vaswani and it includes tracks sung by:

- Jagjit Singh
- Shaan
- Roop Kumar Rathod
- Richa Sharma
