= Ek Raja Ek Rani =

- Genre: Drama
- Written by: Kushan Nandy
- Directed by: Kushan Nandy
- Starring: See below
- Country of origin: India
- Original language: Hindi
- No. of seasons: 1

Production
- Cinematography: Suresh Gowda
- Editor: Deepak Kapoor
- Camera setup: Multi-camera
- Running time: 24 minutes
- Production company: Kushan Nandy Creations

Original release
- Network: DD Metro
- Release: 1996

Ek Raja Ek Rani is an Indian television series that aired in 1996 on DD Metro and later on Zee TV. The series is directed by Kushan Nandy, and stars Shekhar Suman and Bhairavi Raichura.

== Plot ==
Ajay Kapoor (Shekhar Suman) is a wealthy millionaire who is in search for the love of his life. His search ended when he meets beautiful Shweta Mehta (Bhairavi Raichura), but first they have clear all the hurdles to be together. While Shweta's mother (Shubha Khote) and her uncle tries to separate her from Ajay, her father, her cousin and Ajay's best friend Kalidas (Raju Kher) tries everything to help them to be together.

== Cast ==
- Shekhar Suman as Ajay Kapoor
- Bhairavi Raichura as Shweta Mehta
- Raju Kher as Kalidas
- Shubha Khote as Shanti
- Dinesh Hingoo as Mungerilal
- Guddi Maruti
- Amrut Patel
- Kishore Pradhan
- Anoop Kumar as Shopkeeper (Guest Appearance)

== Soundtrack ==
The show has two songs, including the title track, sung by Vinod Rathod. The music is composed by Dinesh Mahavir.

Track list
No.	Title	Singer(s)	Length
1.	"Ek Tha Raja Ek Thi Rani"	Vinod Rathod	1:34
2.	"Sun Sun Dhadkan"	Vinod Rathod
