= Akkad Bakkad Bambey Bo =

- Starring: Devender Chaudhary; Sheetal Maulik; Menaka Lalwani; Prateek Jain; Ankit Shah; Vivek V. Mashru
- Country of origin: India
- Original language: Hindi
- No. of seasons: 1
- No. of episodes: 110

Production
- Running time: 23 minutes
- Production company: Sagar Films (Pvt.Ltd.)

Original release
- Network: Star Plus
- Release: 31 October – 21 December 2005

Akkad Bakkad Bambey Bo (transl. Eeny, meeny, miny, moe) is a television series that aired on Star Plus. The story revolves around the life of a ghost of a road side vendor, who has to perform a certain number of good deeds to go on to heaven, and his upmarket friends who he refers to as babua log. The babua log encounter tough situations related to evil mythical creatures who want to take over the world while performing their day-to-day activities. They are then saved by the vendor who is a ghost himself. The program stars Devender Chaudhry as Natwarlal Prasad Yadav.

== Cast ==
- Devender Chaudhary as Natwarlal Prasad Yadav a.k.a. Nati
- Vivek V. Mashru as Arnav Kapoor
- Menaka Lalwani as Caddy
- Sheetal Maulik as Sheena
- Prateek Jain as Dhruv
- Ankit Shah as Vikram
- Vijay Ganju as Gappu
- KK Goswami as Gappu's Nephew
- Abhinav Jain as Boss
