= Menaka Lalwani =

Indian actress

- Born: 1979 or 1980 (age 46–47); Baroda, India
- Occupation: Actress
- Years active: 2003 - present
- Relatives: Vishal Lalwani (Brother)

Menaka Lalwani is an Indian actress. She is known for her appearances in Indian soap operas. Lalwani is a professional model, beauty pageant contestant and trained classical dancer. She made her Hindi film debut with the 2013 film Miss Lovely.

== Early life ==
Lalwani was born in Baroda. After graduating, she studied advertising and public relations.

== Television ==
Year	Serial	Role	Notes
2004	Aahat		
2005	CID	Various Characters	
2005	Akkad Bakkad Bambey Bo	Caddy	
2005	Baa Bahu Aur Baby	Rimjhim Thakkar (née Talwar)	
2004-2006	Shararat	Tina	
2009	Na Aana Is Des Lado	Rangeeli Avtar Sangwan	
2012	Pavitra Rishtha	Shalini	
2012	Byaah Hamari Bahoo Ka	Nupur	Special appearance in Episode 4
2013	Saraswatichandra	Aarti	
2014	Love by Chance	Smriti	

== Filmography ==
- Chameli (Hindi) - 2003
- Pyar Kare Dis: Feel the Power of Love (Sindhi) - 2007 - Puja
- Miss Lovely (Hindi) - 2012
- Chudail Story (Hindi) - 2016 - as Ria

== External ==
Menaka Lalwani at IMDb
