= Bhairavi Raichura =

Indian television actress

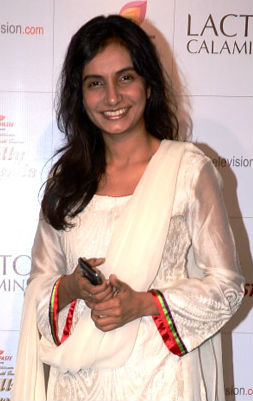
- Bhairavi Raichura at the Colors Indian Telly Awards, 2012
- Born: India
- Occupation: Actress

Bhairavi Raichura is an Indian television actress. She is best known for playing Kaajal Mathur in Hum Paanch, and Rajni Kashyap in Sasural Genda Phool and Bhagwati Singh in Balika Vadhu.

In 1996, she worked opposite Shekhar Suman in the romantic series Ek Raja Ek Rani, playing the role of a simple girl, who falls in love with a wealthy millionaire, who loves her unconditionally.

== Television ==
Title	Role	Channel
Hum Paanch (TV series)	Kajal Mathur aka Kajalbhai	Zee TV
Krishna (TV series)	Gwalan	DD Metro/Zee TV
Ek Raja Ek Rani	Shweta Mehta	DD Metro/Zee TV
Baat Ban Jaaye	Dolly	Zee TV
Woh Rehne Waali Mehlon Ki	Janki/Menaka	Sahara One
Balika Vadhu	Bhagwati Singh	Colors TV
Gudgudee	Nikki	Zee TV
Sasural Genda Phool	Rajni Kashyap	Star Plus
Comedy Circus	Contestant	Sony TV
Astitva...Ek Prem Kahani	Urmila	Zee TV
Laut Aao Trisha	Varsha/Jahnvi	Life Ok
Rajkumari Amba	Shikhandi	Triarga tv
Yes Boss (2005–2007)	Kavita Vinod Verma	Sab TV
Gutur Gu	Sweety	Sab TV
Mukhote	Arti	DD National
Hello Inspector	Episodic role	DD Metro
C.I.D.	Episodic role Anila (Herpes Dongra's girlfriend)	Sony TV

== Awards ==
Year	Award	Category	Serial	Outcome
2010	India Ne Bana Di Jodi Awards	Best Jethani-Devrani along with Pooja Kanwal Mahtani	Sasural Genda Phool	Won
2011	ITA Awards	Best Actress in a Supporting Role (Jury)	Sasural Genda Phool	Won
