= Dam Dama Dam =

- Genre: Comedy
- Written by: M. Salim
- Directed by: Arun Frank
- Starring: see below
- Country of origin: India
- Original language: Hindi
- No. of seasons: 1

Production
- Producer: Himesh Reshammiya
- Camera setup: Multi-camera

Original release
- Network: Zee TV
- Release: 1998

Dam Dama Dam is an Indian television show aired in 1998 on Zee TV. The plot of the show was loosely based on William Shakespeare's Comedy of Errors. The actors Shekhar Suman and Laxmikant Berde played the double roles at the start. Later on, the show was written to include the lead actor's twin sons, there by making Suman and Berde play four roles each.

The show was directed by Arun Frank, who later went on to direct the popular show Zindagi…Teri Meri Kahani. Suman went on to praise the roles he played on the show.

== Plot ==
Two brothers Sarju and Birju come to the city in search of work. Their look-alikes Chichi and Chintoo also live in the city. Confusion and antics ensue every time they run into each other's friends and relatives.

== Cast ==
- Shekhar Suman as Chichi/Sarju/Sonu/Karan
- Laxmikant Berde as Chintoo/Birju/Monu/Arjun
- Neelam Sagar
- Jyoti
- Shilpa A. Singh
- Bhavana Balsavar
- Anant Mahadevan
- Dinesh Hingoo
- Shobha Khote
- Dinyar Contractor as Boss
- Raju Shrestha as Dance master
- Ashiesh Roy as Various characters

== See also ==
- The Comedy of Errors § Adaptations
