= Dinyar Contractor =

Indian actor and comedian (1941–2019)

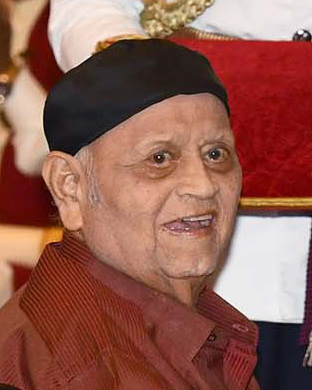
- Contractor, c. 2019
- Born: 23 January 1941
- Died: 5 June 2019 (aged 78); Mumbai, Maharashtra, India
- Other names: Diniyaar Contractor, Deniar Contractor
- Occupations: Actor, writer, director, comedian
- Years active: 1966–2019

Dinyar Contractor (23 January 1941 – 5 June 2019) was an Indian stage actor, comedian and Bollywood/Tollywood actor. He acted in Gujarati theatre and Hindi theatre, as well as Hindi movies. He started acting at school and began his professional career in 1966. He started working on television programs with Adi Marzban when Mumbai Doordarshan launched the DD-2 channel in Mumbai with Aao Marvao Meri Saathe, a Gujarati program. He was awarded the Padma Shri in January 2019. He died on 5 June 2019 in Mumbai.

== Selected Filmography ==
- Cinema Cinema 1979 as Theatre Owner
- Khiladi as Principal
- Jawab as Principal
- Daraar
- Baadshah as Casino Manager
- Kranti as Judge
- Jhankaar Beats as Mr Roy
- Mujhse Shaadi Karogi as School Principal
- Chori Chori Chupke Chupke as general manager of the Hotel
- 36 China Town as Mr. Lobo, servant
- Khichdi: The Movie as Judge

== Television ==
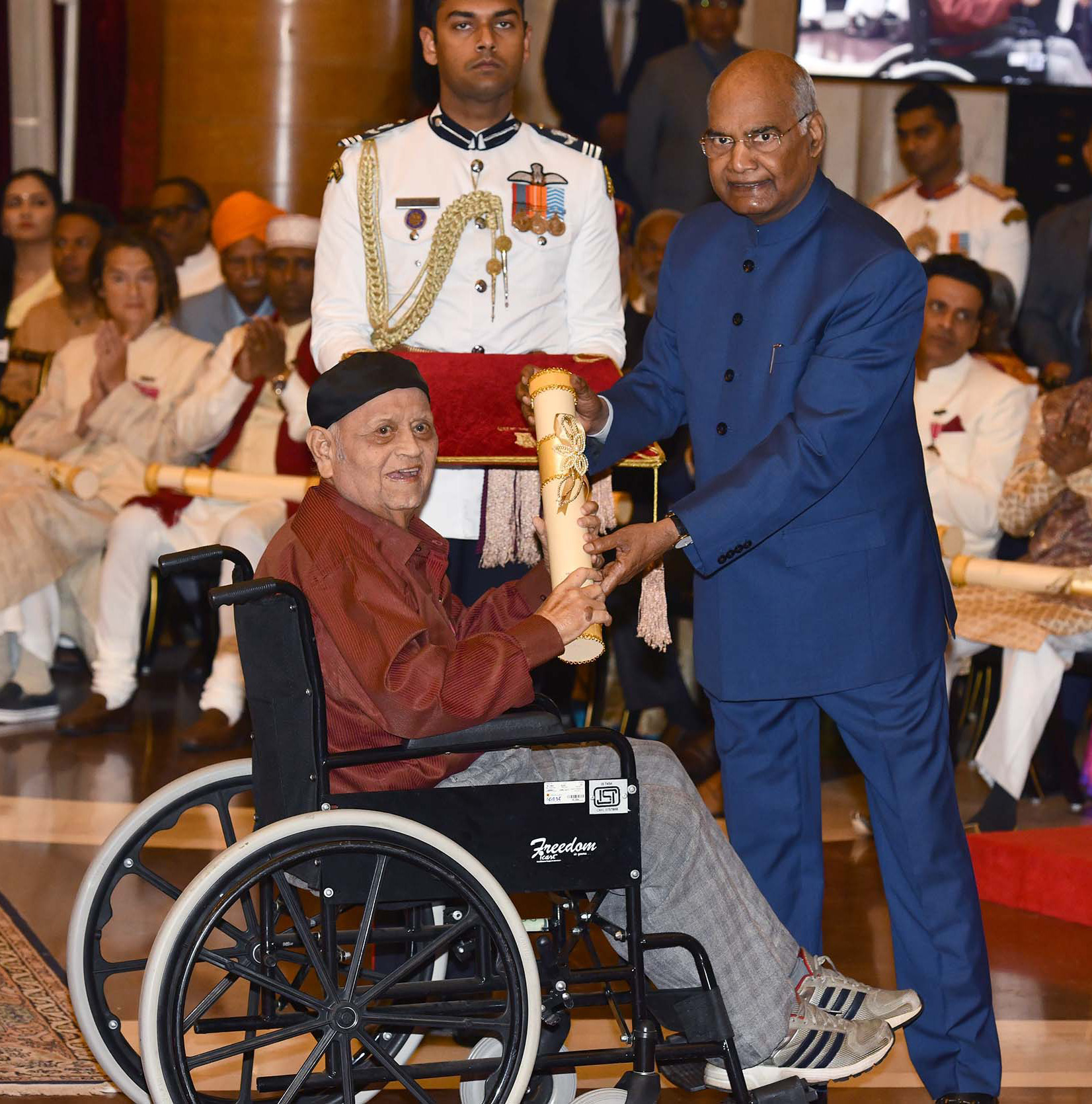
Contractor being awarded the Padma Shri in 2019.

Year	Show	Role
1995	Teri Bhi Chup Meri Bhi Chup	Boss
1996-1999	Kabhi Idhar Kabhi Udhar	Boss
1998-1999	Dam Dama Dam	Boss
1998-2001	Hum Sab Ek Hain	Hasmukh Patel
1998-1999	Do Aur Do Paanch	Dinshu
1998	Dil Vil Pyar Vyar	Special Appearance
2002-2004	Shubh Mangal Savadhan	Vispy Powderwala
2003	Karishma – The Miracles of Destiny	Mr. Contractor
2004	Hum Sab Baraati	
2004	Khichdi	Mr. Mehta
2003-2005	Aaj Ke Shrimaan Shrimati	Mr. Chhamchhamwala
2009	Taarak Mehta Ka Ooltah Chashmah	Sodhi's Father-in-Law
2013	Bh Se Bhade	
