= Sunico Films =

Sunico Productions is a company founded by Denmark-based Indian businessman Mangharam Harwani to preserve Sindhi culture, language, and traditions through film. Sunico produces Sindhi language films, and was the first production house to launch a Sindhi film after a gap of 5 years. Sunico also sells online CDs and DVDs of its films and provides streaming facilities for viewing their movies online, and is considered "one of the leading suppliers in Denmark".

== Films ==
- Pyar Ka Tarana (1993) (written and directed by Dev Anand)
- Pyar Kare Dis : Feel The Power of Love (2007)

== Directors ==
The following directors have worked under the Sunico banner:

- Kamal Nathani – Pyar Kare Dis : Feel The Power of Love (2007)
- Dev Anand – Pyar Ka Tarana (1993)
