= Star Vivaah =

- Promotional logo
- Genre: Reality
- Created by: BAG Films
- Country of origin: India
- Original language: Hindi

Production
- Producer: Nilanjana Puryakastha
- Editor: Umashankar Mishra (senior)

Original release
- Network: STAR Plus
- Release: 13 May – 4 August 2009

Star Vivaah is a Hindi matrimonial reality show premiered on StarPlus on 13 May 2009. The reported purpose of this show is to help young men and women find life partners.

== Plot ==
A matrimonial show in India that attempts to match single people by televising the profiles submitted by the contestants. Show participants how they describe themselves, their home and their regular activities. Celebrity guests from television as well as Bollywood appear on the weekly show.

== Hosts ==
- Mohnish Bahl
- Addite Shirwaikar

== Guests ==
- Juhi Parmar and Sachin Shroff
- Hussain Kuwajerwala and Tina Kuwajerwala
- Anang Desai and Chitra Desai
- Sweta Keswani and Alexx ONell
