= Kavi Kumar Azad =

Indian actor (1972–2018)

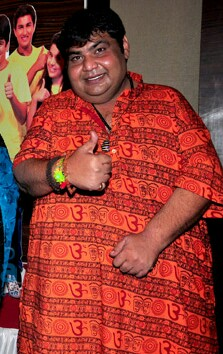
- Azad on set of Taarak Mehta Ka Ooltah Chashmah
- Born: 12 May 1972; Sasaram, Bihar, India
- Died: 9 July 2018 (aged 46); Mumbai, Maharashtra, India
- Occupation: Actor
- Years active: 1992–2018
- Notable work: Taarak Mehta Ka Ooltah Chashmah

Kavi Kumar Azad (12 May 1972 – 9 July 2018) was an Indian film and television actor best known for his portrayal of Dr. Hansraj Baldevraj Hathi in an Indian sitcom Taarak Mehta Ka Ooltah Chashmah.

== Early life ==
After completing his studies, he went to Mumbai to try his luck in films. Early in his career, he worked in several short films and played supporting roles in some films.

== Career ==
He was seen in the film, Jodhaa Akbar as a wheat seller. He acted in the DD National superhero show Junior G (2001–03) as a funny police inspector. He gained popularity from the show Taarak Mehta Ka Ooltah Chashmah, which was started in July 2008. He played the role of Dr. Hansraj Hathi, a resident of Gokuldham Society. He died on 9 July 2018 in Mumbai due to cardiac arrest. His funeral was held at Mira Road.

== Death ==
He died on 9 July 2018 following a heart attack.

== Filmography ==
=== Films ===
Year	Show	Role	Notes
2003	Fun2shh... Dudes in the 10th Century	Royal Guard/Goon on Juhu Beach	Double role
2005	Kyon Ki	Abdul Malik	
2008	Jodhaa Akbar	Wheat seller	

=== Television ===
Year	Show	Role	Notes
1997	Ghar Jamai	Judge at Food Competition	Guest
2001–2003	Junior G	Police Inspector	
2002	Chacha Chaudhary	various characters	
2003	Shararat	Lucky	
2004	Hatim	Argois	
2006	Hero - Bhakti Hi Shakti Hai	Dhappi	
2011	Best of Luck Nikki	Jaanbaz Jaadugar	
2008–2018	Taarak Mehta Ka Ooltah Chashmah	Dr. Hansraj Baldevraj Hathi	
