= Junior G =

Indian Television Series

- Title logo
- Pushpraj Pandey
- Genre: Superhero
- Written by: Sanatan Nehru; Shrikant
- Directed by: Ganshyam Pathak
- Starring: Amitesh Kochhar; Pramod Moutho; Meenakshi Verma; KK Goswami; Kavi Kumar Azad; Peeya Rai Chowdhary; Mugdha Chaphekar; Addite Shirwaikar
- Composer: Umesh Rajput
- Country of origin: India
- Original language: Hindi

Production
- Producer: Aneesh Dev Jhhamb
- Editor: Pinku K. Gupta
- Production company: Wide Angle Media

Original release
- Network: DD National
- Release: 10 November 2001

Junior G – The Magic Starts Now... is an Indian superhero television series that premiered on 10 November 2001 on DD National. It was directed by Ganshyam Pathak.

It features adventures of the orphan boy Gaurav Ray, who can transform to his secret identity Junior G with his magical ring. The boy got his supernatural ability when he accidentally stumbles into the crash between two asteroids. Emerging a much-empowered child from the collision, his mission becomes to destroy the evil wizard genius, Fyumancho.

== Plot ==
A 12 year old orphan, Gaurav Ray who lives with his kind uncle. But at his uncle Gaurav Ray's house he is often abused by his aunt and cousin, Rahul. One day, Gaurav accidentally stumbles into a collision between two asteroids. As a result of the collision, Gaurav is given a ring with magical sacred powers that allows him to transform into the superhero, Junior G. Now, his mission is to defeat the evil wizard Fyomancho who killed his parents.

== Cast ==
- Amitesh Kochhar as Gaurav Ray / Junior G
- Pramod Moutho as Fyumancho
- Meenakshi Verma
- KK Goswami as Bona
- Sunila Karambelkar as Helma
- Ravee Gupta as Daayna
- Ganga Mamgai As Nagina
- Kavi Kumar Azad as Police Inspector
- Ruma Rajni As Catty the catgirl
- Mugdha Chaphekar
- Addite Shirwaikar As Miss Magneto
- Kishwer Merchant As Miss Vidhwansak
- Vaibhavi Raut Behl as Linda
- Pranit Bhatt
- Pradeep Kabra
- Yogesh Tripathi
- Banwari Lal Jhol
- Poonam Katare
