= Gutur Gu =

- Genre: Silent comedy
- Written by: Prabal Baruah, Chitra Patnaik, Nitin Keswwani, Vijay Shetty, Samadhan Nikam, Sangeeta Verekar, Neha Sharma, Sanjay Behera, Illashree goswami & Abhishek Pathak
- Directed by: Prabal baruah
- Starring: See below
- Opening theme: "Gutur Gu" by Shail Hada
- Country of origin: India
- Original language: Hindi
- No. of seasons: 3
- No. of episodes: 189

Production
- Executive producer: Sanjay kumar Behera
- Producer: B. P. Singh
- Camera setup: Multi-camera
- Running time: 24 minutes
- Production company: Fireworks Productions

Original release
- Network: SAB TV
- Release: 5 March 2010 – 6 December 2014

Gutur Gu is a silent comedy broadcast on SAB TV, produced by B. P. Singh and directed by Prabal Barua. It was also India's first silent comedy series. Its cast include, Sheetal Maulik and Sunil Grover along with Nayan Bhatt, Bhavana Balsavar, Jaydutt Vyas and KK Goswami. The show's cast members do not speak on screen.

== Plot ==
- The first season follows Balu who lives with his wife, parents and his grandmother. The episodes feature a series of incidents and confusions that Balu creates.
- The second season revolves around a Punjabi family living in Mumbai.
- The third Season follows Balu who lives with his wife, parents and Pappu Maharaj. The episodes feature a series of incidents and confusions that Balu creates.
- The fourth season follow Bakulesh Shah lives with his wife, parents, sister and their cook K.K Joshi. The episodes feature a series of incidents and confusions that Bakul creates.

== Cast ==
=== Season One ===
- Sunil Grover / Kunal Kumar as Balu Kumar (2010) / (2010-2012)
- Sheetal Maulik as Smita Balu Kumar (2010-2012)
- Nayan Bhatt as Vinita Kumar (2010)
- Bhavna Balsavar as Babita Jay Kumar (2010-2012)
- Jaydutt Vyas as Jay Kumar (2010-2012)
- KK Goswami as Pappu Maharaj (2010-2012)
- Dayanand Shetty as Harpreet Singh (2010-2012)
- Jay Thakkar as Cheeku (2010-2012)
- Nilesh Divekar - various characters (2010-2012)
- Vijay Patkar as various characters (2010-2012)
- Kushal Punjabi as Dancer (2010)
- Atul Parchure as various characters (2010)
- Ishwar Singh as (2010)
- Saheb Das Manikpuri as various characters
- Shafique Ansari as various characters (2010-2012)
- Shubha Khote as Babita mother (2010-2011)
- Neetha Shetty as (2011)
- Tanmay Verma as Smita brother (2011)
- Sharad Vyas as various characters
- Dinesh Phadnis as Inspector (2011)
- Vaibhav Mathur as various characters (2012)
- Shireen Mirza as

=== Season Two ===
- Jaydutt Vyas / Jagat Rawat as Jay Ahuja (2012-2013) / (2013)
- Bhavna Balsavar as Bhavna Jay Ahuja (2012-2013)
- Rahul Lohani as Rahul Ahuja (2012-2013)
- Anita Hassanandani as Anita Rahul Ahuja (2012-2013)
- Shyam Mashalkar as Shyam Ahuja (2012-2013)
- Bhairavi Raichura as Bhairavi Shyam Ahuja (2012-2013)
- KK Goswami as KK (2012-2013)
- Dayanand Shetty as Daya Singh (2012-2013)
- Nilesh Divekar as Professor Iyer (2013)
- Jay Thakkar as Iyer's son (2013)
- Nirmal Soni as various characters (2012-2013)

=== Season Three ===
- Kunal Kumar as Balu Kumar (2014)
- Sheetal Maulik as Smita Balu Kumar (2014)
- Shafique Ansari as Jay Kumar (2014)
- Bhavna Balsavar as Babita Jay Kumar (2014)
- KK Goswami as Pappu Maharaj (2014)
- Dayanand Shetty as Bully Neighbor (2014)
- Harsh Mittal as Cheeku (2014)
- Nilesh Divekar as Dr. Invento (2014)
- Vaibhav Mathur as various characters (2014)
