= Indradhanush =

- Genre: Fantasy; Sci-Fi
- Written by: Rajeev B. Agarwal, Lilliput
- Directed by: Aanand Mahendroo
- Starring: Girish Karnad; Deepa Lagoo; Akshay Anand; Kamla Devi; Sridevi Mukhi; Jitendra Rajpal; Ameesha Jhaveri; Vishal Singh; Karan Johar; Sagar Arya
- Country of origin: India
- Original language: Hindi
- No. of episodes: 13

Production
- Producer: Aanand Mahendroo
- Cinematography: Gyan Sahay
- Editors: Sunil Salgia; Rajesh Bhatia
- Running time: 25 minutes
- Production company: Sootradhar Video Pvt Ltd

Original release
- Network: DD National
- Release: 1989 – 1989

Indradhanush (English: Rainbow) is an Indian children's television series that aired on DD National channel. The series was produced and directed by Anand Mahendroo. It also featured several young actors like Karan Johar, Urmila Matondkar, Vishal Singh, Ashutosh Gowarikar, and Akshay Anand. The show used tracks from Maurice Jarre's score for A Passage to India.

== Plot ==
The shows follows the story of a group of kids, who assemble a computer. The computer becomes the host to an alien prince from a planet in the Andromeda Galaxy on the run from his enemies. The following events take a lot of weird turns leading to one of the friends, Appu, getting kidnapped by one of the enemies of the Prince. The Prince gives the friends a time-travel machine. With this machine they travel to the past and future (1942 and 2013) to rescue their friend.

== Cast ==
- Jitendra Rajpal as Appuswamy Krishnamurthy, known as Appu
- Girish Karnad as Krishnamurthy Appuswamy, Appu's Father
- Deepa Lagoo as Mrs. Ishwari Krishnamurthy, Appu's mother
- Akshay Anand as Balachandran Krishnamurthy, known as Bala, Appu's elder brother
- Vishal Singh as Shoaib, Appu's friend
- Karan Johar as Srikant, Appu's classmate and close friend
- Sagar Arya as Appu's friend
- Kamla Devi as Saroja Appuswamy, Appu's Grandmother
- Sridevi Mukhi as Jayashree Krishnamurthy, Appu and Bala's elder sister, a doctor
- Ameesha Jhaveri as Preeti, Appu's classmate

=== Guests ===
- Ashutosh Gowariker as Mr. Appuswamy, Appu and Bala's grandfather
- Urmila Matondkar as Sunita Shirodkar, Cloned Bala's girlfriend in future
- Vikram Gokhale as a professor, who creates a clone from Bala's DNA.
- Siraj Syed as Seth Jamnadas
- Vishwajeet Pradhan as Joseph
- Gavin Packard as Android
- Daryl Packard as Joshua
- Brij Gopal as Raja

== Production ==
Karan Johar, who played Srikant, has revealed that one of the lead roles in the series was initially offered to Shah Rukh Khan.

== Episodes ==
No.	Title	Directed by
1	"Episode 1"	Aanand Mahendroo
Appu and his friends attempt to build a computer by assembling parts taken from his house.
2	"Episode 2"	Aanand Mahendroo
Appu and gang succeed in making a working computer, but in the night, unbeknownst to them, an alien being enters the computer.
3	"Episode 3"	Aanand Mahendroo
Appu feeds the information to the computer about the world, but he and his friends are shocked when the computer starts talking to them.
4	"Episode 4"	Aanand Mahendroo
Appu's family is celebrating his birthday, but Appu is missing again from the home. Appu takes his friend, Preeti, to show his computer when she makes fun of him when she doesn't believe in his invention. Preeti asks computer about Quit India movement and the computer and suddenly they disappear out of the sight.
5	"Episode 5"	Aanand Mahendroo
Searching for Appu, Bala and Srikant reach godown and Bala finds out about the computer. The computer tells them it has transported Appu and Preeti to 1942 because they wanted to know about Quit India movement. Bala and Srikant travel to 1942 and gets injured in a car accident, driven by his own grandmother and meets his grandfather (Ashutosh Gowariker).
6	"Episode 6"	Aanand Mahendroo
In 1942, Bala loses the remote given to them by the computer to return to 1989, but is able to recover with help of Preeti, who is separated from Appu. In the present, Appu and Preeti's parents are worried about their disappearance. Meanwhile, an android being lands on the earth, looking for Appu.
7	"Episode 7"	Aanand Mahendroo
In 1942, Bala, Srikant and Preeti managed to locate Appu, but he is kidnapped by the android. The computer manages to fight off the android and sends him to Stone Age, but the Android converts Appu into a crystal.
8	"Episode 8"	Aanand Mahendroo
The computer reveals to the gang that it'll need "atomic decoder", which will only be available in 2013, to get Appu back in his body from crystal. Bala time travels to 2013 and realizes that a professor (Vikram Gokhale) has made a clone (also called Bala) from his DNA. He also meets clone's girlfriend, Sunita (Urmila Matondkar).
9	"Episode 9"	Aanand Mahendroo
Bala's presence at clone's house creates a confusion in the house with the professor and Sunita. At first, clone Bala does not believe Bala has indeed time travelled, but ultimately believes him and agrees to share his atomic decoder with him, however somebody has stolen the device.
10	"Episode 10"	Aanand Mahendroo
Bala and Clone Bala use time travel to catch the thief, who is revealed to be the professor's employee, Joseph. Bala takes atomic decoder to present and the computer uses atomic decoder to revive Appu back to his normal body.
11	"Episode 11"	Aanand Mahendroo
The next day, the computer reveals that he's the prince of Andromeda Galaxy and the android was sent from Andromeda to abduct Appu so that his body can be used to revive the usurper, who killed his father. Appu and friends travel to the past with their history teacher, Mr. Sharma, where they are caught by a bandit. The bandit threatens to execute them, but lets them go when they appeal to his conscience. The remote is stolen by Joshua, a student, when they return to the present.
12	"Episode 12"	Aanand Mahendroo
Joshua travels to the past and is caught by a group of cannibals. After apologizing to Appu, the computer allows to use him the remote and return to the present. After Joshua returns, the remote passes through various hands, each meeting an adverse fate.
13	"Episode 13"	Aanand Mahendroo
Bala travels in the past using the android's handheld supercomputer to retrieve the remote, which is stuck in the past. Bala is captured by the king's soldiers in the past. The remote is found by confidantes of a princess Charusheela and they use it to reunite her with her lover, Surendra Singh, but they are captured by enemies. Bala uses the remote to help them evade the enemies, returns to the present and saves Appu from gangsters.

== Reception ==
The show was an instant hit and kept viewers hooked because of its fresh content. It is still considered an important show in the history of Indian television.
