= Vishal Singh (actor, born 1974) =

Indian television actor

- Born: 16 January 1974 (age 52); Mumbai, Maharashtra, India
- Occupations: Actor; model
- Years active: 1982–2018

Vishal Singh (born 16 January 1974) is an Indian television and film actor. He made his debut with science fiction series Indradhanush in 1989 along with Karan Johar. He is most known for his role as Sanju in the comedy series, Dekh Bhai Dekh He was seen as Naitik Singhania in the hit soap opera Yeh Rishta Kya Kehlata Hai, airing on Star Plus.

== Career ==
Vishal Singh was born and brought up in Mumbai. He appeared as a child actor in the 1982 film Rajput. In 1989, Vishal made his television debut as part of the cast of the television show Indradhanush on DD, which was directed by Anand Mahendroo. The story was of four boys and their school life. After this show, Anand Mahendroo selected Vishal for Dekh Bhai Dekh. In the 90s he also played an important role of Bilal in the famous serial Gul Gulshan Gulfaam, directed by Ved Rahi. He also appeared in the Close Up ad and music videos Maikhane se Sharab se, by Pankaj Udhas, Sriram Iyer's Aisa Bhi Kabhi Hota Hai Suchitra Krishnamurthy's Dum Tara and Jagjit Singh's Tumse Bichad Ke.

In 2011, he joined the cast of the TV series, Parvarrish – Kuchh Khattee Kuchh Meethi, playing the role of a father as Jeet Ahuja.

In 2016, he was finalized to portray the parallel lead role of Naitik Singhania in Star Plus's longest-running drama series Yeh Rishta Kya Kehlata Hai. About joining the popular show, he said "I am very excited to play the role of Naitik. Men like him are rarely found today and nothing better than playing an ideal man on screen who can definitely set an example. He is the perfect husband, father and son." In the show, he replaced actor Karan Mehra, who has played Naitik's character for almost seven years.

== Television ==
| Year | Serial | Role | Notes |
|---|---|---|---|
| 1988 | Mirza Ghalib | young Ghalib | |
| 1989 | Indradhanush | Unnamed | |
| 1991 | Gul Gulshan Gulfaam | Bilal | |
| 1993–1997 | Dekh Bhai Dekh | Sanjay "Sanju" Dewan | |
| 1997–1998 | Ghutan | Avinash | |
| 1998 | Saturday Suspense | | |
| 2000 | Ghunghat Ke Pat khol | Groom | |
| 2000 | Rishtey | Unnamed | |
| 2002 | Dil Hai Ki Manta Nahin | Amit | |
| 2002 | Hum Hain Dilwale | Ajay | |
| 2003 | Kashmeer | Kinshuk Kachroo | |
| 2003 | CID | Naveen | Episodic role |
| 2003 | Krishna Arjun | Inspector | Episodic role |
| 2003–2004 | Lipstick | Tarun Singhania | |
| 2004 | Dekho Magar Pyaar Se | | |
| 2004 | Rooh | Ranjeet | Episodic role |
| 2004–2005 | Kabhi Haan Kabhi Naa | Deepankar | |
| 2005 | Ayushmaan | Aryan | |
| 2005 | Hotel Kingston | Rajesh | |
| 2005–2006 | Astitva...Ek Prem Kahani | Dr. Siddhant "Sid" Awasthi | |
| 2005–2007 | Ek Ladki Anjaani Si | Yash | |
| 2007 | Sapna Babul Ka... Bidaai | Rajveer | |
| 2007–2008 | Bhabhi | Dr. Dev Thakral | |
| 2008–2009 | Aathvaan Vachan | Aadesh | |
| 2011–2013 | Parvarrish – Kuchh Khattee Kuchh Meethi | Jeet Ahuja | |
| 2016–2018 | Yeh Rishta Kya Kehlata Hai | Naitik Singhania | |

== Awards ==
- Gold Award for Best Actor in a Supporting Role as Naitik Singhania – Yeh Rishta Kya Kehlata Hai (2017)
