= Addite Malik =

Indian television actress and entrepreneur (born 1982)

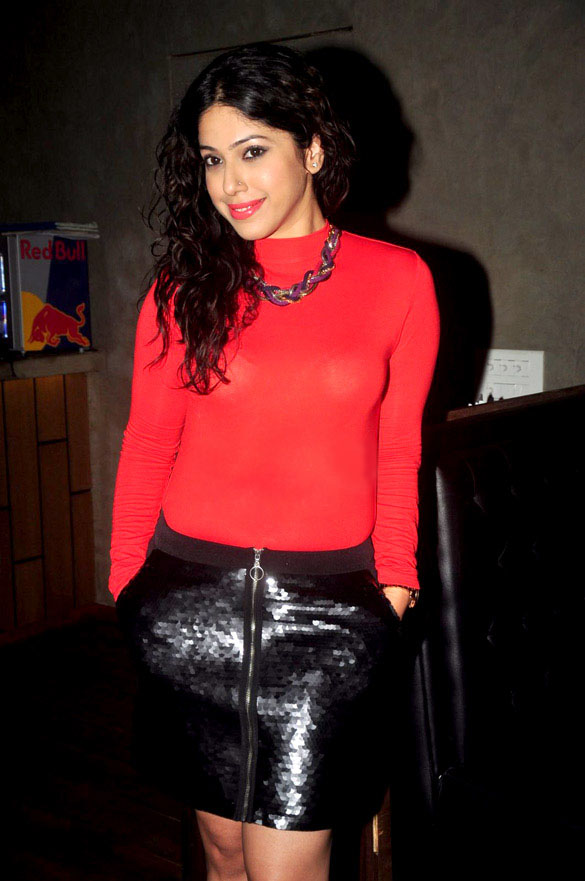
- Malik at husband's Birthday Bash 2015
- Born: Addite Shirwaikar; 13 October; Bombay (now Mumbai), Maharashtra, India
- Occupations: Actress; Anchor; Entrepreneur
- Years active: 2000–2012
- Known for: Shararat; Miilee; Hero-Bhakti Hi Shakti Hai
- Spouse: Mohit Malik (m. 2010)
- Children: 1

Addite Malik (née Shirwaikar; born 13 October) is an Indian television actress and entrepreneur. She is well known for playing the role of Meeta in Shararat and Sonu in Kahaani Ghar Ghar Kii. She started her career in the early 2000s. She has been a part of shows like Baat Hamari Pakki Hai, Junior G, Miilee, 2612.

== Personal life ==
Malik was born to a Maharashtian family in Bombay (now Mumbai). She is married to an Indian television actor and her co-star from Miilee, Mohit Malik. Mohit proposed to Addite on 1 April 2006, the couple became engaged on 14 July 2010, and were married on 1 December 2010. In December 2020, the couple announced that they are expecting their first child in May 2021. She gave a birth to a baby boy Ekbir on 27 April 2021.

== Career ==
She has started her career in early 2000s. She played the role of Sonu, in Ekta Kapoor's serial Kahaani Ghar Ghar Kii. In 2001, she worked in Junior G. In 2002, she played the role of Juhi Parmar's onscreen elder sister Mini Mishra in Kumkum – Ek Pyara Sa Bandhan. In 2003, she played the role of Meeta in Shararat for which she is well known. In 2004, she has done Asit Kumarr Modi's show Saarrthi in which she played the main atagonist Vishakha and Star Plus's Dekho Magar Pyaar Se and Koie Jane Na.

In 2006, she played the role of one of the three sisters with Kamya Panjabi in Banoo Main Teri Dulhann. In 2008, she participated in Nach Baliye 4 with Mohit Malik. In 2009, she hosted Star Vivaah with Mohnish Bahl. In 2010, she had played the role of Preeti Avi's wife in Baat Hamari Pakki Hai opposite Rohit Bharadwaj. In 2011, she played the onscreen sister of Harshad Chopda as Mohan Galla's sister in Dharampatni.

Her last show was 2612 went off air in 2013 in which she played the role of Malti Rakesh Bhargava .

== Entrepreneurship ==
She is the co-owner of nine restaurants, seven in Mumbai, and one in Navi Mumbai and one in Bangalore. Her restaurants are:

- The Homemade Cafe in Oshiwara
- 1BHK Brew House Kitchen in Oshiwara
- The Homemade Cafe and Bar in Juhu (Permanently Closed in 2025)
- 1BHK Bar House Kitchen in Koramangala
- Baoji Asian Home Cafe in Oshiwara
- 1BHK Bar House Kitchen in Vashi
- Que Sera Sera in Andheri West
- Sorozai in Versova
- Rumbabaa in Andheri West

== Television ==
Year	Show	Character
2000	Kahaani Ghar Ghar Kii	Sonu
2001	Junior G	Miss Magneto
2002	Kumkum – Ek Pyara Sa Bandhan	Mini Mishra
2002-2008	CID	Various Characters
2003	Shararat	Meeta
2004	Saarrthi	Vishakha
2004	Dekho Magar Pyaar Se	
	Jai Ganesha	
2004	Koie Jane Na	
2005	Hare Kkaanch Ki Choodiyaan	Komal
2005	Miilee	Khushi
2005	Hero - Bhakti Hi Shakti Hai	Miss Jasmin
2006	Banoo Main Teri Dulhann	Chandramukhi (Chandra)
2008	Nach Baliye4	Contestant
2009	Star Vivaah	Host
2010	Baat Hamari Pakki Hai	Preeti
2010	Adaalat	Surbhi Miland Joshi
2011	Dharampatni	Mohan Galla's sister
2012	2612	Malti Rakesh Bhargava

== See also ==
- List of Indian television actresses
