= Bhavana Balsavar =

Indian actress

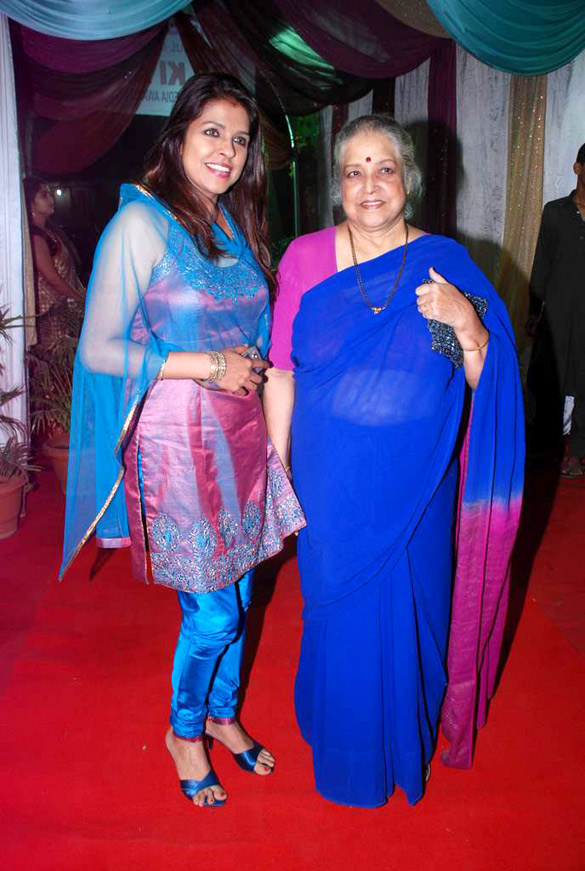
- Balsavar with her mother Shubha Khote
- Born: 21 October 1967 (age 58); Mumbai, Maharashtra, India
- Education: SNDT Women's University
- Occupation: Actress
- Years active: 1993–present
- Spouse: Karan Shah (m. 2002)
- Parent: Shubha Khote (mother)
- Family: Viju Khote (uncle)

Bhavana Balsavar (born 21 October 1967) is an Indian film, stage and television actress. She is the part of silent comedy series, Gutur Gu (2010).

== Personal life ==
Bhavana is the daughter of Hindi cinema actress Shobha Khote and her husband, Mr. D.M.Balsavar. She has two siblings, including Ashwin Balsavar, a sound recordist. Bhavana's mother comes from a family with strong film connections. Bhavana's maternal uncle (Shobha's brother) is the noted actor Viju Khote and her maternal grandfather was the stage and silent-era actor Nandu Khote. Also, Nandu Khote's older brother was the husband of Durga Khote, famous actress of yesteryears. Thus, Bhavana is a grand-niece of Durga Khote.

Bhavana studied at Arya Vidya Mandir High School in Santacruz, Mumbai. She is a graduate in dress designing and fashion coordination from the SNDT Women's University, Juhu, Mumbai.

In 2002, after dating him for thirteen years, Bhavana married the actor Karan Shah. Karan Shah is the nephew of actress and socialite Tina Ambani, who is his mother's younger sister. This is Karan's second marriage and he is the father of two children with his first wife.

== Filmography ==
- Double Gadbad (1999) as Rimjhim
- Dhoom Dadakka (Angoori)
- Sukhi Sansarachi 12 Sutre
- Aamchya Sarkhe Aamhich (Shubhangi)

Television

- Phir Bhi Dil Hai Hindustani (2003) (Saraswati/Saru)
- Dekh Bhai Dekh (Sunita Deewan) (1993)
- Zabaan Sambhalke (Ms. Vijaya) (1993)
- No Problem (1993)
- Tehkikaat (1994) as Maria D'Souza Episode no 16/17 Mystery Behind Missing Girl
- Karamchand
- Idhar Udhar (Katie)
- Asmaan Se Aage
- Oh Daddy
- Askansha
- Mrityu
- Atit
- Jaane Mera Jigar Kidhar Gaya Ji (1996–1997)
- Oh Daddy (1996)
- Hum Aapke Hai Woh (1997)
- Dam Dama Dam (1998)
- Hera Pheri (1999)
- Jugal Bandi
- Hum Sab Baraati (2004) as Bhanu (Chandu's Wife)
- Gutur Gu as (Babita Kumar) (2010–2012)
- Adaalat (Lawyer) (2010)
- Lakhon Mein Ek – episodic role (2012)
- Gutar Gu 2 as (Bhavna Ahuja) (2012–2013)
- Satrangee Sasural as Harpreet (2014–2016)
- Gutar Gu 3 as Babita Kumar (2014)
- Belan Wali Bahu as Premlata Awasthi (2018)
- Gudiya Hamari Sabhi Pe Bhari as Babli Bua (2020)
- Spy Bahu as Minal Kotadiya (2022)
- Scam 2003 as Garima Talpade (2023)
- Meri Saas Bhoot Hai as Kanchan (2023)

== Drama/Theatre ==
- Andhyug
