= Bhoot Unkle =

- Theatrical release poster
- Directed by: Mukesh Saigal
- Screenplay by: Rajeev Agarwal; Veeru Shahane; Dialogues : Mukesh Ramani
- Story by: Aneesh Arjun Dev
- Produced by: Aneesh Arjun Dev; Krishan Choudhary
- Starring: Jackie Shroff; Dev K. Kantawall; Akhilendra Mishra; Sheela David; K. K. Goswami
- Cinematography: C. Vignesh Rao
- Edited by: Sudhir Achary
- Music by: Baba Sehgal
- Production companies: Ikon Pictures; Wam Motion Pictures
- Distributed by: P9 Integrated Pvt Ltd
- Release date: 6 October 2006
- Running time: 105 minutes
- Country: India
- Language: Hindi

Bhoot Unkle is a 2006 Indian Hindi-language supernatural comedy film which released on 6 October 2006. The film is directed by Mukesh Saigal, starring Jackie Shroff and Dev K. Kantawall.

== Plot ==
One day, Shyam discovers an old, abandoned lighthouse on the outskirts of the village. The lighthouse is rumoured to be haunted, and the villagers avoid it at all costs. Driven by curiosity and courage, Shyam ventures inside, where he unknowingly awakens the spirit of a friendly ghost fondly known as "Bhoot Unkle". The ghost, played by Jackie Shroff, is revealed to be the spirit of a kind man who was betrayed and killed under mysterious circumstances.

Bhoot Unkle and Shyam form an unusual bond. With his supernatural abilities and quirky sense of humour, the ghost becomes a protector and mentor to Shyam. He helps Shyam gain confidence and stand up to his bullies, earning him the admiration of his friends and the village children. The ghost also assists Shyam and his friends with their day-to-day challenges in amusing and magical ways, often creating comical situations.

As the story unfolds, Shyam learns about Bhoot Unkle's tragic past. The ghost was once a good-natured man who was wrongfully killed by a greedy and corrupt businessman named Thakur, who sought to seize control of the lighthouse and the surrounding land. Thakur's greed and crimes had gone unchecked for years, and the lighthouse became a symbol of his misdeeds.

Determined to bring justice to Bhoot Unkle and put an end to Thakur's evil plans, Shyam, his friends, and the ghost join forces to expose the truth. Using Bhoot Unkle's supernatural powers and the children's cleverness, they outwit Thakur and his goons. Along the way, the ghost's antics bring laughter and joy, even in the face of danger.

In the climax, Bhoot Unkle confronts Thakur and his men, terrifying them and forcing them to confess their crimes. With his mission finally complete, the ghost is able to find peace. In an emotional farewell, Bhoot Unkle thanks Shyam for his courage and friendship, promising always to watch over him.

The film concludes with Shyam and his friends being celebrated as heroes in the village, while the lighthouse is restored as a safe place free from Thakur's greed.

== Cast ==
- Jackie Shroff as Bhoot Unkle
- Dev K. Kantawall as Shyam
- Akhilendra Mishra as Makhan Lal Akela (MLA)
- Sheela Sharma as Mrs. Akela, MLA's wife
- Anurag Prapanna as Mama
- Rasika Joshi as Mami
- Dinesh Kaushik as Principal
- Shallu Singh as Principal's wife
- Shehzad Khan as Robert
- Massheuddin Qureshi as MLA's man
- K. K. Goswami as Tingu
- Sheena Bajaj as Geeta, Principal's daughter
- Jai Kanani as Satish Kumar Akela aka S. K.
- Mandar Degvekar as Shunty
- Rajesh Vivek as Tangewaala (Friendly Appearance)

== Music ==
1. Mil Gaya Saathi Koi Apna, Bhoot Unkle - Baba Sehgal
2. Mil Gaya Saathi Koi Apna, Bhoot Unkle (Remix) - Baba Sehgal
3. Happy Birthday To You - Tarannum Mallik
4. Hawa Hawa Nee Ho Maa - Baba Sehgal
5. Oh My Mom Ya Toh - Baba Sehgal
6. Udd Ke Jaana Hai - Tarannum Mallik

== Reception ==
Taran Adarsh of IndiaFM gave the film 1.5 out of 5, writing ″Jackie Shroff, the friendly ghost, doesn't work. Dev Kantawala, the child artist, is a complete natural. He's the scene stealer actually. The remaining kids are tolerable. Akhilendra Mishra, Rasika Joshi, Shehzad Khan and Anurag Prapanna are plain mediocre. On the whole, BHOOT UNKLE lacks the power to satisfy its target audience—kids. With not much going in its favor, its chances of survival at the ticket window are bleak.″
