= Ratna Pathak Shah =

Indian actress and director

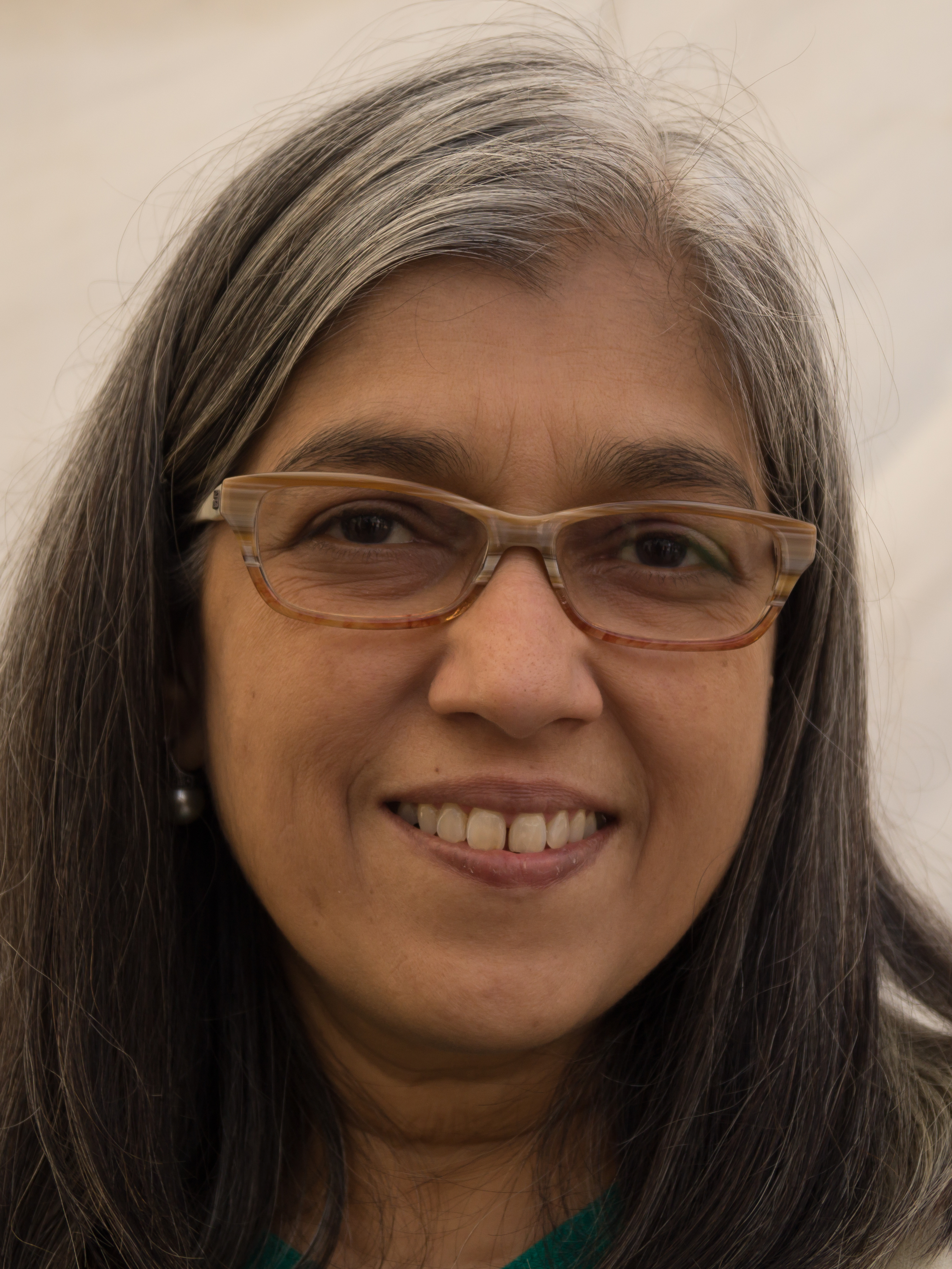
- Pathak at DIFF 2016
- Born: 7 August 1957 (age 69); Bombay, Bombay State, India
- Education: National School of Drama
- Occupation: Actress
- Years active: 1983–present
- Spouse: Naseeruddin Shah (m. 1982)
- Children: 2 (Imaad and Vivaan)
- Mother: Dina Pathak
- Relatives: Pathak-Shah family
- Awards: Full list

Ratna Pathak Shah (born 7 August 1957) is an Indian actress and director known for her work in Hindi theatre, television, and films. Her extensive work in theatre includes a series of plays in both English and Hindi. She rose to prominence when she appeared in the hit TV serial Idhar Udhar in the 1980s.

She garnered widespread recognition and acclaim with her portrayal of Maya Sarabhai, a snobbish socialite in the cult sitcom Sarabhai vs Sarabhai (2004–2006). Her other prominent roles include the coming-of-age romantic comedy Jaane Tu... Ya Jaane Na (2008), the action comedy Golmaal 3 (2010), the family comedy-drama Kapoor & Sons (2016), the black-comedy Lipstick Under My Burkha (2017) and the road adventure drama Dhak Dhak (2023), all of which earned her nominations for the Filmfare Award for Best Supporting Actress. She also received critical acclaim for her performances in the romantic comedies Ek Main Aur Ekk Tu (2012) and Khoobsurat (2014). Her performance in Amazon Prime Video's anthology film Unpaused (2020) earned her a nomination for the Filmfare OTT Award for Best Actress in a Web Original Film.

Daughter of actress Dina Pathak, she married actor Naseeruddin Shah in 1982, with whom she has two sons. Her sister is actress Supriya Pathak, who is married to actor Pankaj Kapur.

== Early life ==
Ratna Pathak was born on 7 August 1957 in Bombay, in the Bombay State (now Mumbai, Maharashtra) of India, into a Hindu family to a Punjabi father, Baldev Pathak and a Gujarati mother, Dina Pathak (née Gandhi), from Amreli in Kathiawar. She is the sister of actress, Supriya Pathak.

Pathak grew up in the Parsi Colony of Dadar with her sister, and is an alumna of the J. B. Vachha High School and the 1981 batch of the National School of Drama in New Delhi.

== Career ==
As well as appearing in many successful films, including Mandi and Mirch Masala, Ratna Pathak appeared as the wife in The Perfect Murder. During the 1980s and 1990s, she also worked extensively in television, appearing in sitcoms such as Idhar Udhar, Filmi Chakkar and Tara.

She also acted in the cult sitcom Sarabhai vs Sarabhai where she played Maya Sarabhai, a high society socialite, which earned her widespread recognition and the ITA Award for Best Actress – Comedy in 2005.

In July 2008, she appeared in the coming-of-age romantic comedy Jaane Tu Ya Jaane Na as the mother of the protagonist. Naseeruddin Shah played her husband, as a deceased character who talks to her from a portrait. She has also acted in several Russian plays, as well as co-founding and being an active member of "Motley Theatre Group". She appeared in the action comedy Golmaal 3 opposite Mithun Chakraborty. She was a part of the Padma Shri and Padma Bhushan Selection Committee for 2012 Awards. Her later film roles included appearances in Kapoor & Sons and Nil Battey Sannata, followed by Lipstick Under My Burkha, in which she played Usha, a middle-aged widow who secretly reads erotic fiction. The film explored women's sexuality and faced opposition from the Central Board of Film Certification before being cleared for release by the Film Certification Appellate Tribunal. Shah also appeared in the drama Thappad.

Shah, starred in her first Gujarati film, Kutch Express in 2023.

== Personal life ==
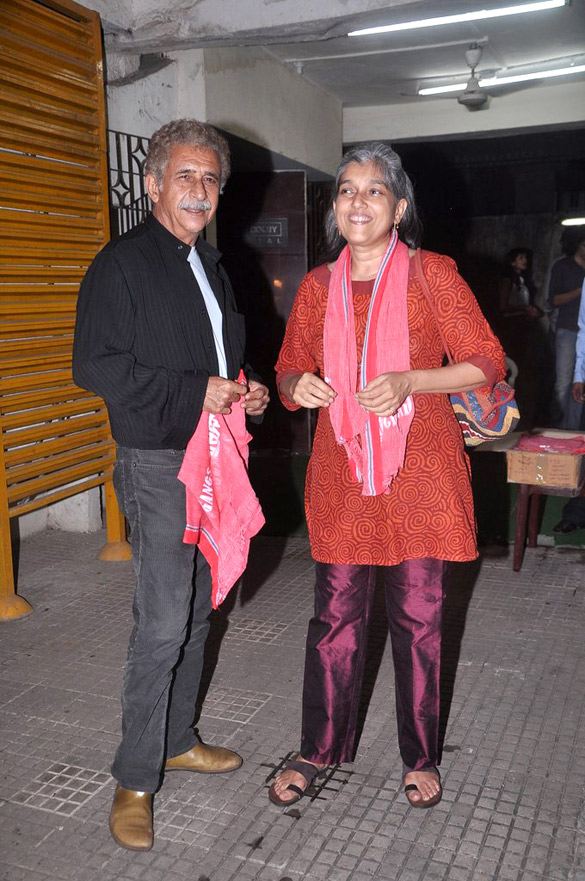
Ratna Pathak with husband Naseeruddin Shah, 2012

Pathak married Naseeruddin Shah in 1982. They have two sons together, Imaad and Vivaan Shah. Naseeruddin also has a daughter, Heeba Shah, from his first marriage.

== Filmography ==
=== Film ===
==== Hindi ====
Year	Film	Role	Notes
1983	Mandi	Malti Devi	Debut
1987	Mirch Masala	Pallavi	
1989	Jazeere	Mrs. Rita Mascarenhas	
2002	Encounter	Sudha Rao	
2005	Paheli	—N/a	Voiceover
2006	Yun Hota Toh Kya Hota	Tara Shankarnarayanan	
2008	Jaane Tu Ya Jaane Na	Savitri Rathod	Nominated—Filmfare Award for Best Supporting Actress
2009	Aladin	Marjina	
2010	Golmaal 3	Geeta	Nominated—Filmfare Award for Best Supporting Actress
2012	Ek Main Aur Ekk Tu	Seema Kapoor	
2014	Khoobsurat	Nirmala Devi	
2016	Kapoor & Sons	Sunita Kapoor	Nominated—Filmfare Award for Best Supporting Actress
2016	Nil Battey Sannata	Dr. Reena Deewan	
2017	Lipstick Under My Burkha	Usha Makhija	Nominated—Filmfare Award for Best Supporting Actress
2017	Mubarakan	Arshveer/Jeeto Kaur Bajwa	
2018	Love per Square Foot	Blossom D'Souza	
2020	Thappad	Sandhya	
2020	Unpaused	Uma Raja Maheshwari	OTT film Nominated—Filmfare OTT Award for Best Actress in a Web Original Film
2021	Hum Do Hamare Do	Deepti Kashyap	Hotstar film
2022	Attack: Part 1	Shanti Shergill	
2022	Jayeshbhai Jordaar	Jashoda	
2023	Dhak Dhak	Manpreet Kaur Sethi "Mahi"	Nominated—Filmfare Award for Best Supporting Actress
2025	Detective Sherdil	Rajeshwari Bhatti	

==== English ====
Year	Film	Role
1983	Heat and Dust	Ritu Verma
1988	The Perfect Murder	Pratima Ghote
1995	Mr. Ahmed	Amma
2011	The Coffin Maker	Isabella

==== Gujarati ====
Year	Film	Role	Note
2023	Kutch Express	Baiji	Debut
2025	Bachu Ni Benpani	Suman Gauri Nagar "Simmi"	

=== Television ===
Year (s)	Show	Character	Notes
1985–1998	Idhar Udhar	Sunita	
1988	Bharat Ek Khoj	Lakshmibai	Episode 42-43 1857
1993–1995	Filmi Chakkar	Rukmani	
1993–1997	Tara	Kanchan	
1996	Mast Mast Hai Zindagi	Kalpana	
1997	Movers & Shakers	Herself	Guest appearance
1999	Gubbare	Ms. Gupta	Episode 6: Jhooth
2000	Apna Apna Style	Suman	
2004–2006	Sarabhai vs Sarabhai	Maya Sarabhai	
2012	The Late Night Show Jitna Rangeen Utna Sangeen	Herself	Guest appearance
2017	Sarabhai vs Sarabhai: Take 2	Maya Sarabhai	
2018	Selection Day	Nellie	
2023	Trial By Fire	Mrs. Bedi	
2023	Happy Family: Conditions Apply	Hemlata Mansukhlal Dholakia	
2023	Charlie Chopra	Ms. Bharucha	

== Awards and nominations ==
Television Awards
Year	Show	Award	Category	Result	Ref.
2005	Sarabhai vs Sarabhai	Indian Telly Awards	Best Actress in a Comic Role	Won	
2006	Sarabhai vs Sarabhai	Indian Television Academy Awards	Best Actress – Comedy	Nominated	
2023	Happy Family: Conditions Apply	2023 Filmfare OTT Awards	Best Actress in a Comedy Series	Nominated	

Film Awards
Year	Film	Award	Category	Result	Ref.
2009	Jaane Tu Ya Jaane Na	Screen Awards	Best Supporting Actress	Nominated	
2009	Jaane Tu Ya Jaane Na	Filmfare Awards	Best Supporting Actress	Nominated	
2011	Golmaal 3	Filmfare Awards	Best Supporting Actress	Nominated	
2011	Golmaal 3	Screen Awards	Best Supporting Actress	Nominated	
2011	Golmaal 3	Zee Cine Awards	Best Actor in a Supporting Role – Female	Nominated	
2011	Golmaal 3	Producers Guild Awards	Best Actress in a Supporting Role	Nominated	
2011	Golmaal 3	International Indian Film Academy Awards	Best Supporting Actress	Nominated	
2017	Kapoor & Sons (Since 1921)	International Indian Film Academy Awards	Best Supporting Actress	Nominated	
2017	Kapoor & Sons (Since 1921)	Stardust Awards	Best Supporting Actress	Nominated	
2017	Kapoor & Sons (Since 1921)	Filmfare Awards	Best Supporting Actress	Nominated	
2017	Kapoor & Sons (Since 1921)	Zee Cine Awards	Best Actor in a Supporting Role – Female	Nominated	
2017	Nil Battey Sannata	Zee Cine Awards	Best Actor in a Supporting Role – Female	Nominated	
2017	Lipstick Under My Burkha	London Asian Film Festival	Standout Performance	Won	
2017	Lipstick Under My Burkha	Indian Film Festival of Melbourne	Best Actress	Nominated	
2018	Lipstick Under My Burkha	Zee Cine Awards	Best Actor in a Supporting Role – Female	Nominated	
2018	Lipstick Under My Burkha	Filmfare Awards	Best Supporting Actress	Nominated	
2021	Unpaused	Filmfare OTT Awards	Best Actress in a Web Original Film	Nominated	
2024	Dhak Dhak	69th Filmfare Awards	Filmfare Award for Best Supporting Actress	Nominated	
