= Hero – Bhakti Hi Shakti Hai =

Indian television series

- Created by: Arif Ali
- Screenplay by: Rahul Bose; Anand Barotia; Rishi Mittal; Ram Kishore Prasad; Deepak Jaul; Sanatan Nehru
- Story by: Rohit Gohlawt
- Opening theme: Joy Ke Sang
- Ending theme: Hero Title Song
- Country of origin: India
- Original language: Hindi
- No. of seasons: 3
- No. of episodes: 168

Production
- Producers: Ronnie Screwvala; Zarina Mehta; Deven Khote
- Cinematography: Durga Prasad Singh
- Running time: 20-22 minutes
- Production company: UTV Software Communications

Original release
- Network: Hungama TV
- Release: 30 May 2005 – 9 August 2007

Hero – Bhakti Hi Shakti Hai (transl. Hero – Devotion is Strength) is an Indian superhero television series which aired on Hungama TV from 30 May 2005 to 9 August 2007. It is about the heroic deeds and adventures of a superhero called Hero, who is bestowed with out-of-this-world magical powers by Goddess Durga to help him fight criminals and supervillains. Created by Arif Ali of UTV and directed by Waseem Sabir and Imtiaz Alam. It starred Sumeet Pathak as the titular superhero.

== Synopsis ==
The story revolves around a boy named Joy, who is disliked by most of his schoolmates. Due to his innocence and indomitable will, the goddess Durga is impressed and gives him a magical ring through which he can transform himself into a superhero named "HERO". From this point on, Joy, as Hero, regularly saves the world from powerful supervillains like Virat and Samrat.

== Cast ==
- Sumeet Pathak as Joy Sehgal/Hero (2005–2007)
- Rupali Suri as Babli (2005)
- Nirmal Soni as Dholu (2005)
- Akshita Garuad as Meenakshi "Meenu" Desai (2005)
- Parth Muni as Balvinder "Chhota Paape" Kulwinder Harnam Singh Sodhi (2005–2007)
- Shilpa Tulaskar as Sunaina Sehgal (2005, 2007)
  - Beena Banerjee replaced Tulaskar as Sunaina (2006)
- Mayank Tandon as Avi Sehgal (2005–2006)
- Addite Malik as Miss Jasmine (2005)
- Rakesh Thareja as Prem Prakash Sharma (2005–2007)
- Lavina Tandon as Charlotte (2005–2006)
- Kishan Savjani as Raju "Rejji" Madan Saxena (2005–2006)
- Dhairya Ojha as Chunky Nayyar (2005)
- Vijay Aidasani as Principal Karnal Raghavan (2005)
- Rajeev Kumar as Varun Sir (2005)
- Farida Jalal as Bebe (2005)
- Pragati Mehra as Kirthar Maami (2005)
- Gaurav Gera as Cameraman Flash (2005)
- Abbas Ali as Goga/Zipzap (2005, 2006)
- Anuj Pandit Sharma as Invisible boy Sadashiv (2005)
- Renuka Bondre as Manorma
- Chahatt Khanna as Princess Myra (2005)
- Akanksha Kapil as Shruti Singh (2006)
- Chetanya Adib as Veer Sehgal/Virat (2006)
- Amano Dhyan as Bubble Badashah (2006)
- Amit K Sinha as Chumbak Choo (2006)
- Shahid Hassan as Gappi (2006)
- Kavi Kumar Azad as Dhappi (2006)
- Shridhar Watsar as Gabbar (2006)
- Vijay Ganju as Cactus Cola (2006)
- Jagesh Mukati as Captain Cooker (2006)
- Narendra Bedi as Changa Mama (2006)
- Shivansh as Honey (2007)
- Shivshakti Sachdev as Neetu Shrivastava (2007)
- Daniyal Hassan as Harry "Harry The Rockstar" Podar (2007)
- Adityansh as Bankey "BB" Babu (2007)
- Bijal Batavia as Sharmila Miss (2007)
- Susheel Parashar as Dr. Darr/Masoom Sir (2007)
- Farzil Pardiwalla as Harry's Dad (2007)
- Sachin Nayak as Umbrella Man (2007)

== Broadcast ==
The series aired from 30 May 2005 to 9 August 2007 on Hungama TV and ran for 3 seasons and 168 episodes. Reruns of the series also aired on Jetix and Disney XD.
