= Zabaan Sambhalke =

1993 Indian Hindi-language television sitcom

- Genre: Sitcom
- Directed by: Rajiv Mehra
- No. of seasons: 2
- No. of episodes: 106

Production
- Camera setup: Multi-camera
- Running time: 24 minutes

Original release
- Network: DD Metro (season 1); Home TV (season 2)
- Release: 1993 – 1998

Related
- Zaban Sambhal Ke

Zabaan Sambhalke (transl. Mind Your Tongue) is an Indian Hindi-language sitcom, directed by Rajiv Mehra. It is an Indian adaptation of the original 1977 British sitcom, Mind Your Language, directed by Stuart Allen, that was broadcast on ITV in the United Kingdom. The show was aired first on DD Metro Channel, Home TV and later on SAB TV.

== Overview ==
Mohan Bharti is an engineer who is forced to teach Hindi in a language school. His students are from throughout the world. Along with him is the obnoxious principal, Ms Lata Dixit of the National Institute of Language (NIL).

== Cast and characters ==
- Mohan Bharti, played by Pankaj Kapur, is an engineer who is forced to teach Hindi in the National Institute of Language, NIL. He hates his job but has no choice. Like Barry Evans as Jeremy Brown, he is charming and handsome and is shorter than all the girls in his class. The girls in the class and the receptionist flirt with him. He constantly complains to Miss Dixit about increasing his salary. He often loses his temper, yells at students and walks out of class.
- Snehlata Dixit, played by Shubha Khote, is referred in the show as Miss Dixit. She is the obnoxious principal who is poked fun at for her weight and miser attitude. She is a shrewd businesswoman who has never married and often dreams of being a Bollywood actress. Later in the show she has a romantic interest in a Russian student Anatoli Molatov.
- Archana, played by Meenakshi Shukla, is Miss Dixit's secretary. She has a small role but is shown in almost all episodes. She seems to have a crush on Mohan Bharti, and she often teases him.
- Prem Prakash Chaturvedi aka PP Chaturvedi, played by Chandu Parkhi, is the peon. His job is to serve tea, and he is often seen sharing jokes with Archana.
- Vijaya Southeast aka Miss Vijayadurai from Madurai, played by Bhavana Balsavar, is a Tamil actress aspiring for roles in Hindi films.
- Charles Spencers, played by Tom Alter, is a British writer living in India. He is later shown married to an Indian woman, played by Asawari Joshi.
- Makkhan Singh, played by Rajinder Mehra, is a Sikh government employee who recently got transferred to Mumbai from Punjab.
- Jennifer Jones, played by Tanaaz Irani, is a flight attendant for American Airlines. She plays the stereotype - wearing short skirts and high heels.
- Mungwango Asoyo, played by Simon Asoyo, is from Congo. He is probably the best student when it comes to Hindi. He once bought kebabs for Miss Dixit on her birthday which were made of snakes; he said they were "Snake Kebab" which because of his pronunciation were taken as "Seenkh Kebab".
- Vittal Bapurao Pote, played by Viju Khote, is a Maharashtrian who works in a local drama. He often comes to class in play costumes.
- Anatoli Molatov, played by Hosi Vasunia, is a Russian diplomat. He is the romantic interest of Miss Dixit. He carried a bottle of vodka which was often mistaken as water by his classmates.
- Sheikh Ruslan-Al-Sulaah, played by Keith Stevenson, is an Arabian sheikh. He is an oil magnate and quite rich and wears a white robe and typical sheikh headgear. He has many cars and he is so rich that even the jerrycan for keeping spare fuel in the car is made of gold. His Hindi is worst in the class, while his last name "Sulaah" was often heard as "Salaa" which is a derogatory remark in Hindi.
- Keki Dastoor Contractor, played by Dinyaar Tirandaz, is a Parsi. He has a laid-back attitude and really bad poetry.
- Vivek Vaswani, played by Vivek Vaswani, is a Sindhi. He is an NRI and rich, but he is a penny pincher and often paranoid about people tricking him and stealing his money.
- Dimple Shah played character of Rupali, who is a highly talkative Gujarati girl.
- Mr Mukherjee, played by Anant Mahadevan, is a Bengali magician, often getting into arguments with Ruslan.

=== Guest ===
- Rock Patel, played by Javed Jaffrey, is seen in two episodes. He is an NRI and a rapper. His catchphrase is YO!, which annoys Mohan Bharti.
- Seema Stallone, played by Moon Moon Sen, she is seen in one episode, she is an NRI from the US (Texas) and has a crush on Mohan Bharati and lovingly calls him Honey Bun.
- Praful Popat Dalal, played by Deven Varma, he is seen in one episode. He plays the role of Street Vendor, selling assorted goods from a suitcase on wheels.
- Johnny Uttolandand, played by Johnny Lever, is seen in one episode. He plays the role of a local gangster who wants to learn Hindi because he is standing for elections.
- Paplu, played by Rakesh Bedi. He is seen in 2 episodes and gifts a car to Mohan Bharti
- Rajjo, played by Ahmad Harhash, has been in a car accident.

== Broadcast ==
The show ran for two seasons, first aired from 1993–1994 with 54 episodes on DD Metro and later from 1997–1998 with another 52 episodes on Home TV and SAB TV.

=== Home media and streaming services ===
Shemaroo Entertainment released VCD and DVD sets of the complete series in 2009.

== Reception ==
Namita Bhandare of India Today wrote, "Based on Mind Your Language, this copycat serial about a group of people trying to learn Hindi still scores." In 2011, Rediff.com in a retrospective article wrote, "Although a remake of Mind Your Language, Zabaan Sambhalke worked because it relied more on the characters than its plot. Its humour sprung from the cultural clashes."

== See also ==
- List of Hindi comedy shows
