= Dekh Bhai Dekh =

Indian television program

- Genre: Sitcom
- Created by: Anand Mahendroo
- Written by: Rajeev B Agarwal
- Starring: N K Shivpuri; Sushma Seth; Navin Nischol; Shekhar Suman; Farida Jalal; Bhavana Balsavar; Vishal Singh; Nattasha Singh; Urvashi Dholakia; Amar Upadhyay; Deven Bhojani; Arrhan Singh
- Opening theme: "Dekh Bhai Dekh" by Udit Narayan
- Country of origin: India
- Original language: Hindi
- No. of seasons: 1
- No. of episodes: 65

Production
- Executive producer: Amitabh Bachchan Corporation
- Producer: Jaya Bachchan
- Camera setup: Multi-camera
- Running time: 22 minutes

Original release
- Network: DD Metro
- Release: 6 May 1993 – 11 August 1994

Dekh Bhai Dekh (transl. Look, brother, look) is an Indian Hindi sitcom which premiered on DD Metro on 6 May 1993. It was created, developed, edited, directed by Anand Mahendroo and produced by Jaya Bachchan under the banner of Saraswati Audio Visuals Pvt Ltd. It starred Shekhar Suman, Navin Nischol, Farida Jalal, Bhavana Balsavar, Deven Bhojani, Sushma Seth, N K Shivpuri, Vishal Singh, and Nattasha Singh.

== Plot ==
The story revolves around three generations of the Diwan family, who live as an extended family in an ancestral bungalow in the suburbs of Mumbai. The show takes the family through relationship troubles, business problems, irksome parents, and in-laws.

== Cast ==
- Sushma Seth as Sarla D Diwan
- N.K. Shivpuri as Durgadas Diwan
- Navin Nischol as Balraj D Diwan
- Shekhar Suman as Sameer D Diwan
- Farida Jalal as Suhasini B Diwan
- Bhavna Balsavar as Sunita S Diwan
- Vishal Singh as Sanjay B Diwan
- Nattasha Singh as Kirti B Diwan
- Sunny Singh as Vishal S Diwan
- Karishma Acharya as Aabha S Diwan
- Amar Upadhyay as Sahil Diwan
- Deven Bhojani as Kareema
- Urvashi Dholakia as Shilpa
- Rakesh Thareja as Dingoo
- Satish Shah as M.K. Rai / Madan
- Divya Seth as Priya
- Benu Kalsi as Badi Nani
- Shammi as Choti Nani
- Daisy Irani as Daisy Mausi
- Rakhee Tandon as Shivani
- Mona Ambegaonkar as Neeru
- Ananya Khare as Zubeida / Leena
- Lilliput as Various characters
- Alyy Khan as Vikram, Vishal's detective friend
- Mushtaq Merchant as Various characters
- Anant Mahadevan as L.M. Narayan
- Deepika Amin episode38 as Richa, Rohit's (Keerti's London returned friend) girlfriend
- Anita Kanwal as Suzie
