= Shubha Khote =

Indian film and television actress

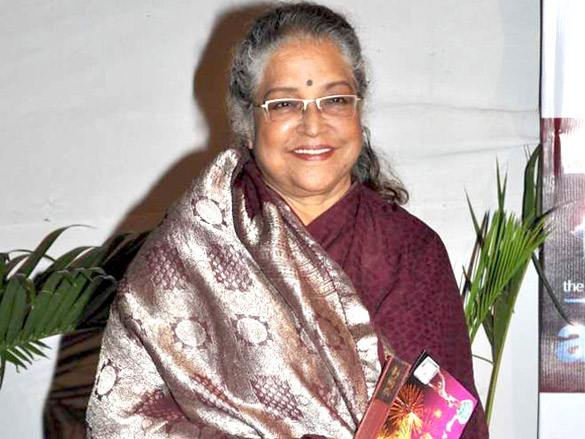
- Khote at ITA Awards 2010
- Born: 30 August 1937 (age 89); Bombay, Bombay Province, British India
- Occupation: Actress
- Known for: Film & Theatre
- Spouse: D. M. Balsavar (m. 1960; died 2024)
- Children: 2 (including Bhavana Balsavar)
- Family: Durga Khote (aunt); Viju Khote (brother)

Shubha Balsavar (née Khote; born 30 August 1937) is an Indian film and television actress who has worked in several Hindi-language and a few Marathi- Bhojpuri-language films. She is also a former women's national champion in swimming and cycling.

== Early life and education ==
Shubha Khote was born into a Marathi-Konkani family, the daughter of noted Marathi theatre personality Nandu Khote by his wife, a Konkani lady from Mangaluru in Karnataka. The actor Viju Khote was her younger brother. Actress Durga Khote was the wife of Shubha's father's brother. Shubha's maternal uncle, Nayampalli, was also an actor.

Shubha Khote studied at St. Teresa's High School, Charni Road and St.Columba school (Gamdevi). As a girl, she excelled at swimming and cycling, and in an era when very few women even ventured into such sports, she was women's national champion in swimming and cycling for three successive years, 1952–55. After completing school, she graduated in English Literature from Wilson College, Mumbai.

Shubha is married to D. M. Balsavar, who was (like Shubha's mother) from Mangaluru. He was the Vice President of Marketing in Nocil, a major Indian corporate. He appeared in a cameo in the Marathi movie Chimukla Pahuna (1968), which she produced and directed. Their daughter, Bhavana Balsavar is also a TV actress.

== Career ==
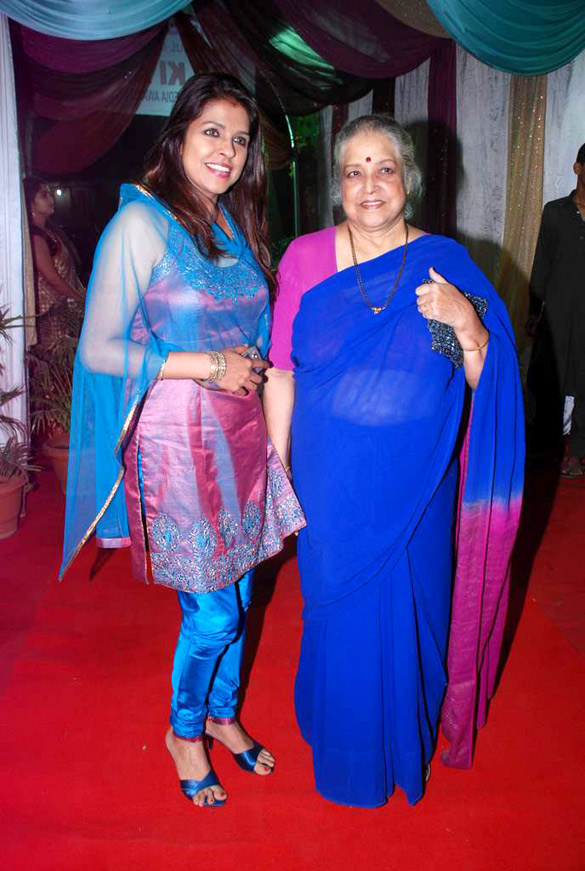
Shubha with her daughter Bhavana Balsavar

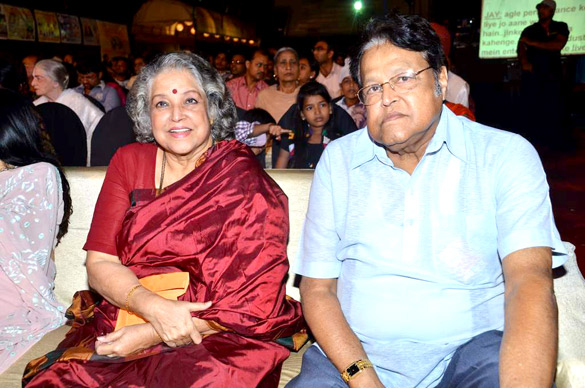
Shubha Khote with her younger brother Viju Khote

She made her stage debut as child actor at age 4, and her film debut in Seema (1955) as Putli. Her good cycling made her widely known, and led to Seema's team casting her. Since then, she has starred in a large number of Hindi and Marathi movies, stage shows, and TV serials. She mostly starred opposite Mehmood and the pair became hit in Sasural, Bharosa, Ziddi, Chhoti Behan, Sanjh Aur Savera, Love in Tokyo, Grahasthi, Humrahi and Beti Bete. She also played negative roles in Paying Guest and Ek Duuje Ke Liye. In 1962, she received two nominations for Filmfare Award for Best Supporting Actress for Gharana and Sasural, though she lost the award to Nirupa Roy.

She has directed comedy plays such as Hera Pheri, Hum Dono, Bachelor's Wife and Let's Do it (2000). Her home production Bachelor's Wives (adapted from the Marathi play Gholat Ghol) had more than 40 performances in Mumbai and Aurangabad. Her TV show Zabaan Sambhalke (based on the Mind Your Language series) was a major hit. She has also worked in the Marathi teleserial Eka Lagnachi Tisri Goshta on Zee Marathi.

== Selected filmography ==
=== Films ===
- Seema (1955)
- Paying Guest (1957)
- Dekh Kabira Roya (1957)
- Mujrim (1958)
- Didi (1959)
- Chhoti Bahen (1959)
- Barkha (1959)
- Anari (1959)
- Gharana (1961)
- Sasural (1961)
- Hamrahi (1963)
- Grahasti (1963)
- Dil Ek Mandir (1963)
- Ziddi (1964)
- Phoolon Ki Sej (1964)
- Akashdeep (1965)
- Love in Tokyo (1966)
- Tumse Achha Kaun Hai (1969)
- Mili (1975)
- Benaam (1974)
- Gol Maal (1979)
- Badalte Rishtey (1978)
- Naseeb (1981)
- Ek Duuje Ke Liye (1981)
- Suraag (1982)
- Ek Din Bahu Ka (1983)
- Pukar (1983)
- Hamar Bhauji (1983)
- Main Awara Hoon (1983)
- Coolie (1983)
- Mera Faisla (1984)
- Gangvaa (1984)
- Hum Dono (1985)
- Haqeeqat
- Saagar (1985)
- Aakhir Kyon? (1985)
- Mazloom (1986)
- Swarag Se Sunder (1986)
- Hifazat (1987)
- Maza Pati Karodpati (1988)
- Khoon Bhari Maang (1988)
- Billoo Badshah (1989)
- Kishen Kanhaiya (1990)
- Jawani Zindabad (1990)
- Sher Dil (1990)
- Pyar Hua Chori Chori (1990)
- Begunaah (1991)
- Karz Chukana Hai (1991)
- Dil Hai Ki Manta Nahin (1991)
- Saudagar (1991)
- Ek Ladka Ek Ladki (1992)
- Parda Hai Parda (1992)
- Junoon (1992)
- Anari (1993)
- Waqt Hamara Hai (1993)
- Saajan Ka Ghar (1994)
- Sangdil Sanam (1994)
- Koyla (1997)
- Sirf Tum (1999)
- Shararat (2002)
- Toilet: Ek Prem Katha (2017)
- Bucket List (2018)
- Double XL (2022)

=== Television ===
- Junoon (1994)
- Zabaan Sambhalke (1993–1998)
- Ek Raja Ek Rani (1996)
- Andaaz (1998)
- Dam Dama Dam (1998–1999)
- Jugni Chali Jalandhar (2008–2010)
- Baa Bahoo Aur Baby (2010)
- Eka Lagnachi Tisri Goshta (2013, Marathi-language)
- Mangalam Dangalam (2018–2019)
- Spy Bahu (2022)
- Thipkyanchi Rangoli (2022, Marathi-language)

== Awards ==
Year	Award	Category	Nominated work	Result	Ref.
1962	9th Filmfare Awards	Filmfare Award for Best Supporting Actress	Gharana	Nominated	
1962	9th Filmfare Awards	Filmfare Award for Best Supporting Actress	Sasural	Nominated	
2025	23rd Pune International Film Festival	PIFF Distinguished Award	—N/a	Won	
