= Raju Kher =

Indian film actor and film director (born 1957)

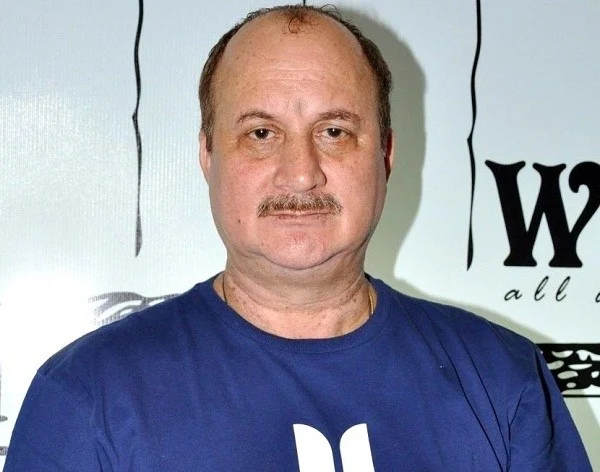
- Born: 11 September 1957 (age 68); Baramulla, Jammu and Kashmir, India
- Occupations: Actor; director
- Years active: 1998–present
- Spouse: Reema Kher (m. 1986)
- Children: 2
- Relatives: Anupam Kher (brother)

Raju Kher (born 11 September 1957) is an Indian actor and director. He has acted in many television serials and films. He directed the television serial Sanskaar in 1999. He is the brother of actor Anupam Kher.

== Personal life ==
Raju Kher was born on 11 September 1957 in Baramulla, in the erstwhile Indian state of Jammu and Kashmir, into a Kashmiri Pandit family. Kher is married to Reema Kher. The couple has a daughter named Vrinda Kher. His brother Anupam Kher is an actor, who married Kirron Kher in 1985.

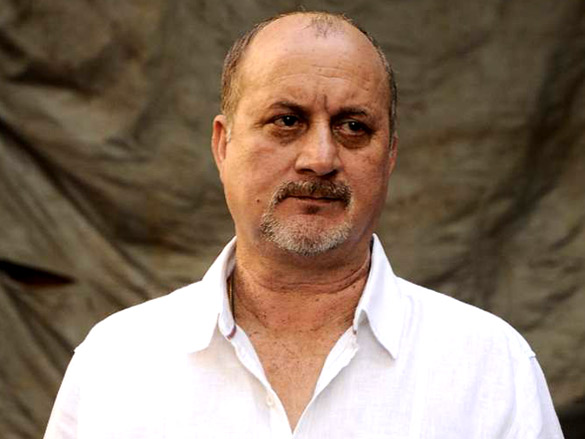
Raju Kher at the launch of Anupam Kher's book 'The Best Thing About You is... You'

== Filmography ==
Kher appeared in the following films and television serials:

=== Films ===
- Ghulam as Alisha's father
- Jungle as Mr. Malhotra
- Bub
- Om Jai Jagadish
- Bardaasht (2004) as Ramona's father (A. Saxena)
- Ab... Bas! (2004)
- Dreams (2005) as (Pooja's Father)
- Humne Jeena Seekh Liya (2008) as Mr. Sharma
- Delhi Belly (2011) as Zubin Mehra (Sonia's Father)
- Shootout at Wadala (2013) as Inspector Ambolkar
- Krrish 3 (2013) scientist at Kaal's Lab
- Ya Rab (2014)
- Main Tera Hero (2014)
- Black Home (2015)
- Love Exchange (2015)
- Dirty Boss (2016)
- Indian Never Again Nirbhaya (2018) as Rajnath (father of Nirbhaya)
- Shinaakht (2018)
- Darbar- Tamil as Deputy Chief Minister (uncredited)
- Raakshasaru-Kannada Film (2022)
- Uunchai - as Gagan "Guddu" Sharma, Om's brother (2022)
- Patna Shuklla as Tanvi's Father (2024)

=== Television ===
As an Actor

- Khauff on Sony SAB (Episode 7 & Episode 8)
- Kuldeepak (2017) on &TV
- Naati Pinky Ki Lambi Love story (2020) on Colors tv
- Yeh Kahaan Aa Gaye Hum on Zee TV
- Kahan Se Kahan Tak on Zee TV
- Karm on Zee TV as Pranlal Dhawan
- Sailaab on Zee TV
- Umeed on Zee TV
- Jeene Bhi Do Yaaro on SAB TV
- Tere Ghar Ke Saamne on SAB TV
- Jugni Chali Jalandhar as Jugni's Father on SAB TV
- Abhi Toh Mai Jawan Hun on SAB TV
- Kashmakash on Doordarshan
- Imtihaan on Doordarshan
- Manzile on Doordarshan
- Abhilasha on DD Kashir
- Thoda Hai Thode Ki Zaroorat Hai on Sony Entertainment Television (India)
- Ek Raja Ek Rani (1996)-Kalidas
- Gopaljee (1996) - Colonel Jagannath Michoo
- Ghar Jamai (1996) -Varma Special Appearance only in episode no 35 Zee Tv
- Rishtey (1999-2001)
- Fultoo Pagal Hai (2005)-Happy
- Hamari Betiyoon Ka Vivaah (2008)-Kulbhushan Singh
- Pari Hoon Main (2008) on Star One -
- Taarak Mehta Ka Ooltah Chashmah (2010)-Mr. Chandi Ramani
- Parvarrish – Kuchh Khattee Kuchh Meethi - Mr. Ahluwalia Lucky's father Sweety's father-in-law on Sony Entertainment Television (India)
- C.I.D. on Sony Entertainment Television (India)
- Beintehaa on Colors TV
- Yam Hain Hum on Sab TV
- Doli Armaano Ki on Zee TV as Darshan Tiwari (Tiwari Ji)
- Tamanna on Star Plus
- Ek Maa Jo Laakhon Ke liye Bani - Amma (2016) on Zee TV - Faqeera
- Ret Ka Dariya (2002–05) on Sahara One
- Dil Dhoondta Hai (2017) on Zee TV
- Adaalat - Public Prosecutor on Sony Entertainment Television (India)
- Aashao Ka Savera... Dheere Dheere Se on Star Bharat

As a Director

- Sanskaar on Zee TV
- Ret Ka dariya on Sahara
- Manzile on Doordarshan
- Abhilasha on DD Kashir
- Kuch khatti kuch mithi baatein with Anupam Uncle on Zee smile
- Quiz show on renewable energy on Zee News
- Nokia 3.2 Mobile Advertisement with Alia Bhatt T3
