= Abhilasha (TV series) =

Indian soap opera

- Genre: Drama; Family
- Created by: Sumeet Hukamchand Mittal; Shashi Mittal
- Written by: Savin Shetty; Dialogues; Uday Bhagavatula(1–56); Suresh Kakumani (57–102); Narendra Kumar yenuganti (103–122)
- Screenplay by: Savin shetty
- Directed by: Dinesh Painoor (1–10); Kumar M (11–102); Sanjeev Reddy Lingala (103–122)
- Creative directors: Amit Bhargava; Creative head Konda Rambabu; Ravi Kishore Gurajada
- Starring: Spandana; Rohit Sahni; Ajay Raj; Sirisha Sougandh
- Theme music composer: Meenakshi Bhujangh
- Opening theme: "Aa toorpu sindhuram la" Hemachandra (vocals); Sagar (lyrics)
- Country of origin: India
- Original language: Telugu
- No. of seasons: 1
- No. of episodes: 122

Production
- Producers: Shashi Mittal; Sumeet Mittal; Jithendra Singhla; Rajeev porvaal
- Cinematography: Sudesh kotain M Kumar; Cameraman; Umesh
- Editors: Ramakrishna kanchi Satish Kulkarni Anagonda
- Camera setup: Multi-Camera
- Running time: 20–22 minutes
- Production company: Shashi Sumeet Productions

Original release
- Network: Gemini TV
- Release: 26 August 2019 – 18 January 2020

Abhilasha was an Indian Telugu language soap opera starring Spandana, Rohit Sahni as main protagonists and Ajay Raj, Sirisha Sougandh in pivotal roles. It aired on Gemini TV from 26 August 2019 to 18 January 2020. The serial was directed by Kumar M and produced by Shashi Sumeet productions. It is the remake of Kannada television series Naanu Nanna kanasu which was aired on Udaya TV.

== Plot ==
The story revolves around Janaki, an academically brilliant student who aspires to fulfill her father's dream by becoming a successful doctor in future. Her father Shankar (Ravi kiran) was a chef in great business man, Vishnu vardhan's (Sai Kiran) house. He lied to her daughter that he was a doctor in order to fulfill his dream. Bhuvaneswari (Ravali), wife of Vishnu Vardhan was jealous of Shankar and his family as her husband helps them. On the other hand, Bhuvaneswari's son has dispute with Janaki at school. She always tries to make her husband separated from Shankar and stop helping them. One day Janaki knows the truth about her father's profession but she decided to become a doctor in order to fulfill her father's dream. Unexpectedly, Janaki's life take a drastic turn as fate conspire against and her father died in an accident. No one knows that the accident was a plan of Bhuvaneswari in order save herself from exposure of truth to her husband by about her secret relationship with Manohar. Janaki knows that she has to face many obstacles coming her way to realise her goals. How the girl succeeds in becoming a doctor despite several hurdles forms the crux of the story. Janu, a humble cook‚ Äôs daughter and Ram, son of a rich businessman share a fond friendship from childhood. As the years roll by, their bond blossoms into love, when Janu, whois all set to achieve her ambition to become a doctor, saves Ram‚ Äôs depleting business from his manipulative stepmother Bhuvana. Follow, how they succeed in life, against Bhuvana‚ Äôs longstanding mysterious hatred.

== Cast ==
- Spandana as Janaki (Jaanu)
- Rohit Sahni as Raghuram, Vishnuvardhan's son
- Ajay Raj as Lucky, Vishnuvardhan's younger son
- Srinivas Varma as Vishnu vardhan, Raghuram & Lucky's father
- Sirisha Sougandh as Bhuvaneswari, Lucky's mother & Raghuram's foster mother
- Suchitra as Gowri, Jaanu's mother
- Sudheer as Neelakanta, Jaanu's Uncle
- Sharif Vikram as Manohar

=== Former cast ===
- Ravi Kiran as Shankar, Jaanu's father (deceased)
- Baby Greeshma as young Jaanu
- Sai Kiran as Vishnu Vardhan, Raghu, Lucky and Tara's father (Replaced by Srinivas Varma)
- Master Venkat Showrya as young Lucky
- Master Satwik as young Raghuram
- Baby sharanya as young Tara

== Adaptations ==
Language	Title	Original release	Network(s)	Last aired	Notes
Kannada	Naanu Nanna Kanasu ನಾನು ನನ್ನ ಕನಸು	5 August 2019	Udaya TV	9 April 2020	Original
Telugu	Abhilasha అభిలాష	26 August 2019	Gemini TV	18 January 2020	Remake
Telugu	Penmanikkaga பென்மணிக்காக	3 November 2025	Gemini TV	Ongoing	Dubbing with subtitle
