= Shararat (TV series) =

Indian sitcom youth series

- Directed by: Rajiv Mehra
- Starring: Farida Jalal; Shoma Anand; Mahesh Thakur; Poonam Narula; Eva Grover; Shruti Seth; Addite Shirwaikar; Harsh Vashisht; Simple Kaul; Karanvir Bohra
- Opening theme: "Shararat" by Sunidhi Chauhan
- Country of origin: India
- Original language: Hindi
- No. of seasons: 1
- No. of episodes: 192

Production
- Producers: Ronnie Screwvala; Zarina Mehta; Deven Khote
- Running time: 23 minutes
- Production company: UTV Software Communications

Original release
- Network: StarPlus
- Release: 24 January 2003 – 17 November 2006

Shararat – Thoda Jaadu, Thodi Nazaakat (transl. Mischief – A little magic, a little fun) is an Indian fantasy sitcom which aired on StarPlus channel from 2003 to 2006. The show is loosely based on the American teen sitcom Sabrina the Teenage Witch.

== Synopsis ==
Shararat revolves around Jiya, who is the great-great-great-great-granddaughter of Rani Devi. The show opens on the occasion of Jiya's 18th birthday. Hailing from a family of fairies, Jiya unknowingly becomes the wielder of magical powers. As a result of good deeds by ancestors, her family's first girl child of each generation is blessed with magical powers on turning 18 and so is Jiya. Jiya lives with her family: her father Dr. Suraj Malhotra, her mother Radha, her brother Jai and her maternal grandmother Sushma. Apart from this, there are Jiya's college friends and acquaintances such as the stud basketball player Dhruv on whom Jiya secretly has a crush. Dhruv returns her ardor, while Parminder (or Pam, as she yells at everybody to call her), the latest NRI entry in the college, threatens Jiya that she will grab all of Dhruv's attention; Meeta her starry-eyed and romantic best friend and Raja, Dhruv's best friend who is always irritated with Meeta running after him. Pam is also the niece of Shanti Saberwal the classic neighbor of Malhotra's who is convinced that everything is not normal with the Malhotra household and who always goes there to borrow something or the other. She also has a crush on Suraj. She has a son named Bittu who sometimes teases Jiya's brother Jai. The Malhotra home with three fairies who use, or rather misuse, their magic nearly always ends up in some trouble. Suraj, who learned on his wedding day that not only his wife but also his mother-in-law is a fairy, has to deal with his mother-in-law who insists that her daughter and granddaughter practice magic for almost everything. Midway through the series, Bebo, a 10-year-old fairy, is sent to live with the Malhotra family as she is causing mischief everywhere in Paristan, the world of fairies. Normally, a fairy cannot use her magical powers until her 18th birthday, on which Rani Devi sprays a few drops of magical potion on the fairy, thereby releasing all her magical powers. However, Bebo accidentally falls in the entire pot of potion, and that's why she can do magic when other underage fairies cannot.

Due to misunderstandings created by Jiya's duplicate between Jiya and Dhruv, Dhruv is not talking to Jiya. Nani opens Naughty Nani's cafe and also helps Jiya to get her job, a writer. On her job, she impresses her manager with her work and a coworker develops crush on her and starts sending cards to her. Shanti also opens a marriage bureau in Nani's cafe where a man wants to marry Jiya instead of Pam but Jiya is saved by Nani. To help Jiya, Nani gives Shanti and her husband's love to Jiya and Dhruv but this goes wrong and they end up having a fight. Meanwhile, when Jiya thinks that her feelings for Dhruv have changed and she isn't missing him, Neil Bajaj enters her life with the motive of acquiring the magical powers of three of them (Sushma, Radha, and Jiya). She is smitten by his charm. Elsewhere, when Dhruv gets to know that Jiya is perfectly normal from their broken friendship, he decides to meet her at Nani's cafe where he gets introduced to Neil who challenges Dhruv to win an arm-wrestling match against him. Neil let's Dhruv win the match, thus winning Jiya's heart. Neil informs his boss that their plan to separate Jiya and Dhruv is working as for the first time in life Jiya did not mind Dhruv losing any match. Jiya is confused with her feelings for Neil and Dhruv. Neil even tries to kill Dhruv and snatch Jia's powers but fails. This creates a doubt in the fairies' minds about Neil's intentions. However, Jiya still thinks he is innocent. Later, Sushma and Jiya enter a fairy tale book followed by Radha who plays a modern fairy Godmother, Jiya has to play a character resembling Cinderella, and Pam and Shanti are her step-relatives. She is extremely excited to know that Dhruv is her prince. Meanwhile, Neil uses this opportunity and decides to snatch their magical powers and burn the book. Bebo and Suraj try to stop him but in vain. In the fairy tale, Sushma and Radha's powers become weak and Jia loses consciousness. Prince Dhruv helps them reach the place from where they entered the tale. All three of them make it just in time and are able to save themselves and catch Neil but he escapes the situation by making some excuse. Afterward, he tries to kill Dhruv and gets caught by the fairies. Later, Jiya takes part in World Best Fairy Championship and wins it by giving defeat to Shani Devi and her granddaughter who try to disqualify her.

The Malhotras move into a new house, which is haunted by four stupid but paranoid ghosts: Colonel Pritam Singh, who used to attend Sushma's college and has a crush on her since then; his son Amar Prem, whose life ambition has been to get 1000 customers to make life insurance with him; Amar's wife Pritika, who wants to become a vamp (an antagonistic actress in soap operas); and their son Nidar, who has developed a crush on Jiya. The ghost family had died whilst holidaying in the Malhotra house, and hate the family as they do not want humans to stay at the house, which they now call theirs. They play many pranks on the Malhotras, and the Malhotras in turn use their magic to annoy them, with both parties trying to force the other to leave the house forever. The Malhotra eventually succeeds with the four ghosts attaining salvation and leaving the house. The story ends with Dhruv returning from Australia. He proposes to Jiya and she accepts it. Then, as per the fairy rules they need to get married in 6 hours otherwise they'll not be able to marry each other ever. Jia convinces Suraj for this marriage on the condition that they reveal their true identity of being fairies to Dhruv, who initially gets scared but agrees to marry Jiya. Also Sushma and Jiya promise Suraj that they will never use magic on Dhruv and they seem to keep their promise. But we see that Radha (who ideally never used her powers unless very urgent), uses her spell on Dhruv to make him sink halfway in the ground when he refuses to eat the heavy breakfast made by her thus following Sushma's footsteps of troubling the son-in-law of the family.

== Cast ==
- Shruti Seth as Jiya Malhotra, Suraj and Radha's daughter, Jay's elder sister, Sushma's granddaughter and 3rd Indian Fairy.
- Farida Jalal as Sushma Mehra, Radha's mother, Suraj's mother-in-law, Jiya and Jay's maternal grand-mother and 1st Indian Fairy.
- Poonam Narula as Radha Malhotra, Suraj's wife, Jiya and Jay's mother, Dhruv's mother-in-law, Sushma's daughter and 2nd Indian Fairy.(2003–2004)
  - Eva Grover replaced Narula as Radha (2005–2006)
- Mahesh Thakur as Dr. Suraj Malhotra, Radha's husband, Jiya and Jay's father, Dhruv's father-in-law, Sushma's son-in-law, and Mrs. Malhotra's son.
- Karanvir Bohra as Dhruv, Jiya's boyfriend later husband, Jay's brother-in-law, Suraj and Radha's son-in-law.
- Addite Shirwaikar as Meeta, Jia's best friend and Raja's love interest.
- Harsh Vashisht as Raja, Dhruv's best friend, Meeta's love interest.
- Shoma Anand as Shanti Saberwal, Pam's aunt, Monti's mother and wants to marry Suraj so Radha gets jealous.
- Simple Kaul as Parminder Sohni alias Pam, Shanti's niece.
- Adnan Jp as Jai Malhotra, Suraj and Radha's son, Jiya's younger brother, Sushma and Mrs. Malhotra's grandson.
- Dhairya Ojha as Bittu, Shanti's son, Jai's friend.
- Vaishnavi Sharma as Bebo. An unusually young Fairy from Paristan who entails magical powers equivalent to that of Nani's is fostered by the Malhotra family on Rani Devi's request.
- Shammi as Rani Devi (2003)
- Daisy Irani as Rani Devi, the Queen of Fairyland, the Leader and Creator of Fairies (2003-2006)
- Rinku Worah as Eena, Pam's friend.
- Maneka Lalwani as Tina, Pam's friend.
- Sindhu Parjaat as Lovely, Pam's friend.
- Delnaaz Irani as Pritika, Amar Prem's wife, Nidar's mother, Karnal's daughter-in-law, and Bhoot of a new house of Malhotras.
- Sooraj Thapar as Amar Prem, Pritika's husband, Nidar's father, Karnal's son, and Bhoot of new house of Malhotras.
- Carran Kapoor as Neelabh alias Neel.

=== Guest appearances ===
- Parikshit Sahni as Khushwant Mehra, Sushma's Husband
- Karishma Tanna as Natasha
- Deepshikha Nagpal as Ria
- Amit Varma as Rocky
- Pushtiie Shakti as Monti's
- Teejay Sidhu as Stella
- Purab Kohli as Dhunketu
- Vishal Malhotra as Ranjha
- Kamini Khanna as Suraj's mother
- Salil Acharya as Prince
- Krishna Bhatt as Thief
- Kavi Kumar Azad as Lucky

== Broadcast ==
The series premiered on 23 January 2003 on Star Plus and concluded on 17 November 2006 after 192 episodes. Reruns of the show also aired on STAR Utsav, TV Asia, STAR One and Disney Channel India.

=== Home media and streaming services ===
The series was made available on Hotstar on 26 June 2019.
