= ITA Award for Best Actor - Comedy =

Indian Television Academy award

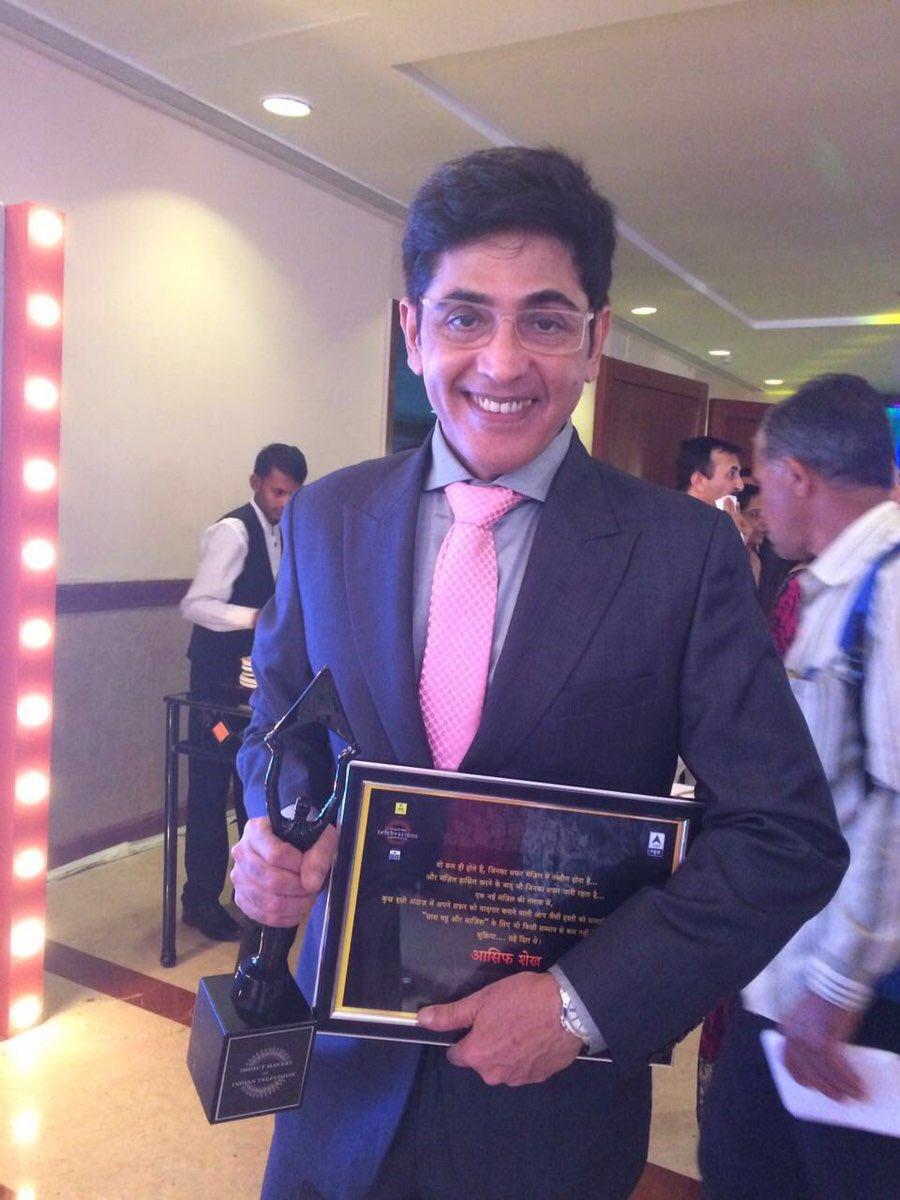
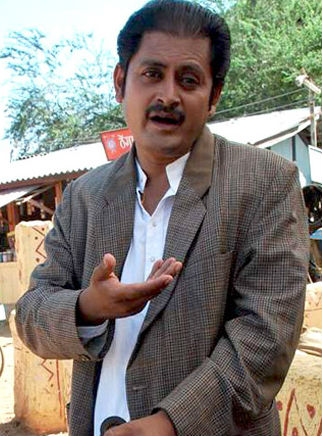
- The 2024 Recipients: Aasif Sheikh (Jury); Rohitash Gaud (Popular)
- Awarded for: Best Performance by an Actor in a comic Role on Television
- Country: India
- Presented by: Indian Television Academy
- First award: 2001
- Final award: 2024

Highlights
- Total Awarded: 30
- First Winner: Farooq Sheikh for Ji Mantriji (2001) (Jury); Pankaj Kapur for Office Office (2001) (Popular)
- Last Winner: Aasif Sheikh for Bhabi Ji Ghar Par Hai! (Jury); Rohitash Gaud for Bhabi Ji Ghar Par Hai! Popular

ITA Award for Best Actor - Comedy is an award given by Indian Television Academy as a part of its annual event to a male actor in television series who has delivered an outstanding performance in a comic role.

== Winners ==
Year	Photo	Actor	Character	Show	Category	Ref
2001		Pankaj Kapur	Mussadi Lal	Office Office	Popular	
2001		Farooq Sheikh	Surya Prakash Singh	Ji Mantriji	Jury	
2002		Pankaj Kapur	Mussadi Lal	Office Office	Jury	
2003		Pankaj Kapur	Mussadi Lal	Office Office	Jury	
2004		Pankaj Kapur	Mussadi Lal	Office Office	Jury	
2005		Satish Shah	Indravadan Sarabhai	Sarabhai vs Sarabhai	Jury	
2006		Deven Bhojani	Gopal 'Gattu' Thakkar	Baa Bahoo Aur Baby	Jury	
2007		Pankaj Kapur	Mussadi Lal	Naya Office Office	Jury	
2008		Cyrus Broacha	Himself	The Week That Wasn't	Jury	
2009		Cyrus Broacha	Himself	The Week That Wasn't	Jury	
2010		Rohitash Gaud	Mukundi Lal Gupta	Lapataganj	Jury	
2011		Cyrus Broacha	Himself	The Week That Wasn't	Jury	
2012		Dilip Joshi	Jethalal Gada	Taarak Mehta Ka Ooltah Chashmah	Jury	
2012		Kapil Sharma	Various Characters	Kahani Comedy Circus Ki	Jury	
2013		Kapil Sharma	Bittu Sharma	Comedy Nights with Kapil	Jury	
2014		Dilip Joshi	Jethalal Gada	Taarak Mehta Ka Ooltah Chashmah	Jury	
2015		Rohitash Gaud (awarded jointly with Shilpa Shinde as Jodi)	Manmohan Tiwari	Bhabi Ji Ghar Par Hai!	Popular	
2015		Krushna Abhishek & Sudesh Lehri (awarded jointly as Duo)	Various characters	Comedy Circus	Popular	
2015		Cyrus Broacha & Kunal Vijaykar (awarded jointly as Creators)	Themselves	The Week That Wasn't	Popular	
2016		Aasif Sheikh	Vibhuti Narayan Mishra	Bhabi Ji Ghar Par Hai!	Jury	
2017		Aasif Sheikh	Vibhuti Narayan Mishra	Bhabi Ji Ghar Par Hai!	Jury	
2017		Rohitash Gaud	Manmohan Tiwari	Bhabi Ji Ghar Par Hai!	Jury	
2018		Aasif Sheikh	Vibhuti Narayan Mishra	Bhabi Ji Ghar Par Hai!	Jury	
2018		Rohitash Gaud	Manmohan Tiwari	Bhabi Ji Ghar Par Hai!	Jury	
2019		Kiku Sharda	Bacha Yadav	The Kapil Sharma Show	Jury	
2019		Krushna Abhishek	Sapna	The Kapil Sharma Show	Jury	
2020	Not Awarded				Jury	
2021		Rohitash Gaud	Manmohan Tiwari	Bhabi Ji Ghar Par Hai!	Jury	
2021		Dilip Joshi	Jethalal Gada	Taarak Mehta Ka Ooltah Chashmah	Jury	Popular
2022		Sumeet Raghavan	Rajesh Wagle	Wagle Ki Duniya – Nayi Peedhi Naye Kissey	Jury	
2022		Dilip Joshi	Jethalal Gada	Taarak Mehta Ka Ooltah Chashmah	Popular	
2023		Sumeet Raghavan	Rajesh Wagle	Wagle Ki Duniya – Nayi Peedhi Naye Kissey	Jury	
2024		Aasif Sheikh	Vibhuti Narayan Mishra	Bhabi Ji Ghar Par Hai!	Jury	
2024		Rohitash Gaud	Manmohan Tiwari	Bhabi Ji Ghar Par Hai!	Popular	
