= ITA Award for Best Actor in a Supporting Role =

Indian Television Academy award

- Awarded for: Best Performance by an Actor in a Supporting Role on Television
- Country: India
- First award: Shabbir Ahluwalia for Kahiin To Hoga (2005)
- Currently held by: Sanjay Narvekar for Udne Ki Asha (2024)

ITA Award for Best Actor in a Supporting Role is an award given by Indian Television Academy Awards as a part of its annual event for TV serials, to recognize a male actor who has delivered an outstanding performance in a Supporting Role.

== Winners ==
Year	Actor	Character	Show	Ref
2005	Shabbir Ahluwalia	Rishi Grewal	Kahiin To Hoga	
2006	Ali Asgar	Kamal Aggarwal	Kahaani Ghar Ghar Kii	
2007	Paresh Ganatra	Pravin Thakkar	Baa Bahoo Aur Baby	
2008	Ali Asgar	Kamal Aggarwal	Kahaani Ghar Ghar Kii	
2009	Aditya Lakhia	Nanku	Agle Janam Mohe Bitiya Hi Kijo	
2010	Ayub Khan	Jogi Thakur	Uttaran	
2011	Anup Soni	Bhairon	Balika Vadhu	
2012	Not Awarded			
2013	Ali Asgar	Dolly "Dadi" Sharma	Comedy Nights with Kapil	
2014	Shakti Anand	Maharana Udai Singh	Bharat Ka Veer Putra – Maharana Pratap	
2015	Vishal Singh	Jigar Modi	Saath Nibhaana Saathiya	
2016	Manoj Joshi	Chanakya	Chakravartin Ashoka Samrat	
2017	Varun Badola	Raghav Srivastava	Mere Angne Mein	
2018	Anup Upadhyay	Murari Bansal	Jijaji Chhat Per Hain	
2019	Yogesh Tripathi	Happu Singh	Bhabiji Ghar Par Hain!	
2020	Kiku Sharda	Bacha Yadav	The Kapil Sharma Show	
2020	Krushna Abhishek	Sapna	The Kapil Sharma Show	
2021	Krushna Abhishek	Sapna	The Kapil Sharma Show	
2022	Arvind Vaidya	Hasmukh Shah	Anupamaa	
2022	Yogesh Tripathi	Happu Singh	Bhabiji Ghar Par Hain!	
2023	Aanjjan Srivastav	Srinivas Wagle	Wagle Ki Duniya – Nayi Peedhi Naye Kissey	
2024	Sanjay Narvekar	Paresh Deshmukh	Udne Ki Asha	
