= ITA Award for Best Actress Comedy Jury =

Indian Television Academy award

ITA Award for Best Actress - Comedy
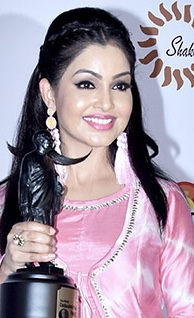
- The 2024 recipient Shubhangi Atre
- Awarded for: Best Performance by an Actress in a comic Role on Television
- Country: India
- Presented by: Indian Television Academy
- First award: 2001
- Final award: 2024

Highlights
- Total Awarded: 24
- First Winner: Archana Puran Singh for Aasman Se Tapki (2001)
- Last Winner: Shubhangi Atre for Bhabhi Ji Ghar Par Hai!

ITA Award for Best Actress - Comedy is an award given by Indian Television Academy as a part of its annual event to a female actor in television series who has delivered an outstanding performance in a comic role.

== Winners ==
Year	Actor	Character	Show	Channel	Reference
2001	Archana Puran Singh		Aasman Se Tapki	Zee TV	
2002	Supriya Pilgaonkar	Radha	Tu Tu Main Main	Star Plus	
2003	Farida Jalal	Sushma Mehra	Shararat	Star Plus	
2004	Supriya Pathak	Hansa Parekh	Khichdi	Star Plus	
2005	Ratna Pathak	Maya Sarabhai	Sarabhai vs Sarabhai	Star One	
2006	Divya Dutta	Shanno	Shanno Ki Shaadi	Star Plus	
2007	Suchita Trivedi	Meenakshi Thakkar	Baa Bahoo Aur Baby	Star Plus	
2008	Disha Vakani	Daya Gada	Taarak Mehta Ka Ooltah Chashmah	SAB TV	
2008	Supriya Pathak	Baarmaasi	Remote Control	9X	
2009	Disha Vakani	Daya Gada	Taarak Mehta Ka Ooltah Chashmah	SAB TV	
2010	Kavita Kaushik	Chandramukhi Chautala	F.I.R.	SAB TV	
2011	Kavita Kaushik	Chandramukhi Chautala	F.I.R.	SAB TV	
2012	Bharti Singh	Various Characters	Comedy Circus	SAB TV	
2013	Kavita Kaushik	Chandramukhi Chautala	F.I.R.	SAB TV	
2014	Disha Vakani	Daya Gada	Taarak Mehta Ka Ooltah Chashmah	SAB TV	
2015	Shilpa Shinde (awarded jointly with Rohitash Gaud as Jodi)	Angoori Tiwari	Bhabi Ji Ghar Par Hai!	&TV	
2016	Shubhangi Atre Poorey	Angoori Tiwari	Bhabi Ji Ghar Par Hai!	&TV	
2017	Shubhangi Atre Poorey	Angoori Tiwari	Bhabi Ji Ghar Par Hai!	&TV	
2018	Shubhangi Atre Poorey	Angoori Tiwari	Bhabi Ji Ghar Par Hai!	&TV	
2019	Shubhangi Atre Poorey	Angoori Manmohan Tiwari	Bhabi Ji Ghar Par Hai!	&TV	
2019	Bharti Singh	Babli Mausi/Lalli	The Kapil Sharma Show	Sony TV	

Since 2021, the award was divided into two categories namely, Best Actress in a Comedy Popular & Jury

=== ITA Award for Best Actress in a Comedy - Popular ===
Year	Actor	Character	Show	Channel	Reference
2021	Bharti Singh	Titli Yadav	The Kapil Sharma Show	Sony Entertainment Television	
2022	Bharti Singh	Herself/Chachi	The Kapil Sharma Show	Sony Entertainment Television	
2023	Bharti Singh	Favvara Devi	Favvara Chowk	Dangal TV	
2024	Munmun Dutta	Babita Iyer	Taarak Mehta Ka Ooltah Chashmah	SAB TV	

=== ITA Award for Best Actress in a Comedy - Jury ===
Year	Actor	Character	Show	Channel	Reference
2021	Pariva Pranati	Vandana Wagle	Wagle Ki Duniya – Nayi Peedhi Naye Kissey	Sony SAB	
2022	Shubhangi Atre	Angoori Tiwari	Bhabi Ji Ghar Par Hai!	& TV	
2023	Sumona Chakravarti	Bindu Sharma	The Kapil Sharma Show	Sony TV	
2024	Shubhangi Atre	Angoori Tiwari	Bhabi Ji Ghar Par Hai!	& TV	
