= Indian Telly Award for Best Actor in a Comic Role =

Indian Telly Award for Best Actor in a Comic Role – Male
- Awarded for: Best Performance by an Actor in a Comic Role on Television
- Country: India
- Presented by: IndianTelevision.com
- First award: 2002 (for performances in TV shows in 2001)
- Currently held by: Yogesh Tripathi for Bhabiji Ghar Par Hain! (Popular); Dilip Joshi for Taarak Mehta Ka Ooltah Chashmah (Jury)
- Website: Indian Telly Awards

Indian Telly Award for Best Actor in a Comic Role – Male is an award given by Indiantelevision.com as part of its annual Indian Telly Awards for TV serials, to recognize a male actor who has delivered an outstanding performance in a comic role.

The award was first awarded in 2002. Since 2010, the award has been separated in two categories, Jury Award and Popular Award. Winner of Jury award is chosen by the jury of critics assigned to the function while Popular Award is given on the basis of public voting.

== Superlatives ==
Superlative	Popular		Overall (Popular + Jury)	
Actors with most awards	Dilip Joshi	4	Dilip Joshi	5
Actors with most nominations	Dilip Joshi	6	Dilip Joshi	11
Actors with most nominations (without ever winning)	Varun Badola; Sunil Grover	3	Varun Badola; Sunil Grover; Atul Parchure	3

== List of winners (Popular) ==
=== 2000s ===
- 2002 Pankaj Kapur - Office Office as Mussadi Lal
  - Suraj Thapar - Hum Saath Aath Hain as Ram
  - Vrajesh Hirjee - Yeh Hai Mumbai Meri Jaan as Hariprasad aka Harry
  - Varun Badola - Yeh Hai Mumbai Meri Jaan as Balkrishna aka Balu
  - Mushtaq Khan - Tedhe Medhe Sapne
- 2003 Pankaj Kapur - Office Office as Mussadi Lal
  - Dilip Joshi - Shubh Mangal Savadhan as Dilip
  - Sanjay Mishra - Public Hai Sab Janti Hai as Public/Neta
  - Vineet Kumar - Ramkhilawan C.M. 'n' Family as Ramkhilawan
  - Gurpal Singh - Chuppa Rustam as Gurpaal
- 2004 Rajeev Mehta - Khichdi as Praful Parekh
  - Pankaj Kapur - Office Office as Mussadi Lal
  - Gaurav Gera - Jassi Jaissi Koi Nahin as Nandu
  - Anang Desai - Khichdi as Tulsidas Parekh
  - Sanjay Mishra - Public Hai Sab Janti Hai as Public/Neta
- 2005 Rajesh Kumar - Sarabhai vs Sarabhai as Rosesh Sarabhai
  - Rajeev Mehta - Instant Khichdi as Praful Parekh
  - Bakhtiyaar Irani - Batliwala House No. 43 as Shahrukh
  - Satish Shah - Sarabhai vs Sarabhai as Indravardhan Sarabhai
  - Manoj Pahwa - Life Out Of Control as Gurpreet
- 2006 Satish Shah - Sarabhai vs Sarabhai as Indravardhan Sarabhai
  - Pankaj Kapur - Naya Office Office as Mussadi Lal
  - Varun Badola - Soni Mahiwal as Suresh
  - Cyrus Sahukar - Rendezvous With Semi Girebaal as Semi Girebal
  - Rajesh Kumar - Sarabhai vs Sarabhai as Rosesh Sarabhai
- 2007 Deven Bhojani - Baa Bahoo Aur Baby as Gopal "Gattu" Thakkar
  - Pankaj Kapur - Naya Office Office as Mussadi Lal
  - Varun Badola - Soni Mahiwal as Suresh
  - Rahul Lohani - Jabb Love Hua as Bhola
  - Dilip Rawal - Thodi Khushi Thode Gham as Parag
- 2008 Deven Bhojani - Baa Bahoo Aur Baby as Gopal "Gattu" Thakkar
  - Rakesh Bedi - Yes Boss as Mohan Srivastava
  - Suraj Thapar - Kuchh Is Tara as Aditya Nanda
  - Sunil Grover - Kaun Banega Champu as Ruk Ruk Khan
- 2009 Dilip Joshi - Taarak Mehta Ka Ooltah Chashmah as Jethalal Gada
  - Deven Bhojani - Baa Bahoo Aur Baby as Gopal "Gattu" Thakkar
  - Sumeet Raghavan - Ghar Ki Baat Hai as Rajdeep Yagnik
  - Vivek Mushran - Bhaskar Bharti as Amarjeet Bhatia

=== 2010s ===
- 2010 Dilip Joshi - Taarak Mehta Ka Ooltah Chashmah as Jethalal Gada
  - Sumeet Raghavan - Sajan Re Jhoot Mat Bolo as Apoorva Shah
  - Swapnil Joshi - Papad Pol as Vinaychand
  - Rajeev Thakur - Sajan Re Jhoot Mat Bolo as Ishwar/Raju
  - Prasad Barve - Dill Mill Gayye as Dr. Jitendra Prasad
- 2011 No Award
- 2012 Dilip Joshi - Taarak Mehta Ka Ooltah Chashmah as Jethalal Gada
  - Paresh Ganatra - Chidiya Ghar as Ghotak Narayan
  - Atul Parchure - R. K. Laxman Ki Duniya as Bhavesh Vasavda
  - Deven Bhojani - Mrs. Tendulkar as Suhas Tendulkar
  - Abbas Khan - Lapataganj as Pappu Pandey a.k.a. Biji Pandey
- 2013 Dilip Joshi - Taarak Mehta Ka Ooltah Chashmah as Jethalal Gada
  - Ali Asgar - Jeannie Aur Juju as Captain Vikram Khana aka Juju
  - Jeetu Shivhare - Chidiya Ghar as Gadha Prasad
  - Rohitash Gaud - Lapataganj as Mukundilal Sughandilal Gupta
  - Atul Parchure - R. K. Laxman Ki Duniya as Bhavesh Vasavda
- 2014 Kapil Sharma - Comedy Nights with Kapil as Kapil "Bitto" Sharma
  - Aamir Dalvi - Hum Ne Li Hai... Shapath as Senior-Inspector Kav
  - Rohitash Gaud - Lapataganj - Ek Baar Phir as Mukundi Lal Gupta
  - Dilip Joshi - Taarak Mehta Ka Ooltah Chashmah as Jethalal Gada
  - Krushna Abhishek - Comedy Circus Ke Mahabali
- 2015 Rohitash Gaud - Bhabi Ji Ghar Par Hai! as Manmohan Tiwari
  - Aashif Sheikh - Bhabi Ji Ghar Par Hai! as Vibhuti Narayan Mishra
  - Sumeet Raghavan - Badi Door Se Aaye Hain as Vasant Ghotala
  - Dilip Joshi - Taarak Mehta Ka Ooltah Chashmah as Jethalal Champaklal Gada
- 2016 No Award
- 2017 No Award
- 2018 No Award
- 2019 Rohitash Gaud - Bhabi Ji Ghar Par Hai! as Manmohan Tiwari
  - Aashif Sheikh - Bhabi Ji Ghar Par Hai! as Vibhuti Narayan Mishra
  - Dilip Joshi - Taarak Mehta Ka Ooltah Chashmah as Jethalal Champaklal Gada
- 2021 Rohitash Gaud - Bhabi Ji Ghar Par Hai!
  - Dilip Joshi - Taarak Mehta Ka Ooltah Chashmah

== Jury Award ==
=== 2010s ===
- 2010 Sumeet Raghavan - Sajan Re Jhoot Mat Bolo as Apoorva Shah
  - (Nominations not available)
- 2011 No Award
- 2012 Rajesh Kumar - Chintu Chinki Aur Ek Badi Si Love Story as Dristhdumn Sarveshwar Sharma
  - Deven Bhojani - Mrs. Tendulkar as Suhas Tendulkar
  - Paresh Ganatra - Chidiya Ghar as Ghotak Narayan
  - Dilip Joshi - Taarak Mehta Ka Ooltah Chashmah as Jethalal Gada
  - Rajendra Gupta - Chidiya Ghar as Kesari Narayan
- 2013 Ali Asgar - Jeannie Aur Juju as Captain Vikram Khana aka Juju
  - Atul Parchure - R. K. Laxman Ki Duniya as Bhavesh Vasavda
  - Dilip Joshi - Taarak Mehta Ka Ooltah Chashmah as Jethalal Gada
  - Gopi Bhalla - F.I.R. as Gopinath Gandotra
  - Shridhar Watsar- Baal Veer as Dooba Dooba
- 2014 Krushna Abhishek - Comedy Circus Ke Mahabali (tied with) Rohitash Gaud - Lapataganj - Ek Baar Phir as Mukundi Lal Gupta
  - Ali Asgar - Jeannie Aur Juju as Captain Vikram Khana aka Juju
  - Sanjay Chaudhary - Lapataganj - Ek Baar Phir as Chukundilal Mukundial Gupta
  - Sudesh Lehri - Comedy Circus Ke Mahabali
- 2015 Not Awarded
- 2019 Dilip Joshi - Taarak Mehta Ka Ooltah Chashmah as Jethalal Gada
- 2021 Dilip Joshi - Taarak Mehta Ka Ooltah Chashmah
- 2025 Aasif Sheikh for Bhabiji Ghar Par Hai
