= Yogesh Tripathi =

Indian film and television actor (born 1979)

- Born: Rath, Uttar Pradesh India
- Education: Bundelkhand University, Jhansi
- Occupations: Film and television actor
- Years active: 2015–present
- Known for: Bhabi Ji Ghar Par Hai!; Happu Ki Ultan Paltan
- Spouse: Sapna Tripathi (m. 2011)
- Children: 2

Yogesh Tripathi is an Indian actor best known for playing Happu Singh in the sitcom Bhabiji Ghar Par Hain! and in its spin-off, Happu Ki Ultan Paltan, where he plays the lead role. The former ranks among the longest running Indian comedy sitcoms.

== Early and personal life ==
He initially struggled in the industry, taking on small roles in theatre and television commercials. His big break came when he was cast as Daroga Happu Singh in Bhabiji Ghar Par Hain!, and later starred in the spin-off Happu Ki Ultan Paltan, which made him a household name.

== Career ==
Tripathi’s acting career took off with TV shows like F.I.R. (2008–2009) and Chidiya Ghar. He gained widespread recognition with Bhabiji Ghar Par Hain! (2015–present) and later starred in its spin-off series, Happu Ki Ultan Paltan (2019–present). Tripathi made his Bollywood debut in the 2009 Paa (2009), then appearing in films like Admission Open (2010), and Bulbul (2017).

== Filmography ==
=== Films ===
| Year | Title | Role | Other notes |
|---|---|---|---|
| 2009 | Paa | | |
| 2012 | 1920: Evil Returns | Chand | |
| 2017 | Bulbul | Guruji | short |
| 2010 | Admissions Open... Do What You Are Born For... | Ramu | |
| 2021 | Soch-Alay | | short |
| 2023 | Hisaab Barabar | Kumar | |
| 2026 | Bhabiji Ghar Par Hain! Fun On The Run | Happu Singh | |

=== Television ===
| Year | Show | Role | Notes |
|---|---|---|---|
| 2006–2015 | FIR | Various roles | |
| 2010–2011 | Ring Wrong Ring | | |
| 2009–2014 | Lapataganj | Lovely Singh | |
| 2015 | Peterson Hill | | |
| 2015–2016 | Sahib Biwi Aur Boss | | |
| 2018–2019 | Jijaji Chhat Per Hain | Chotte | |
| 2015–2025 | Bhabiji Ghar Par Hain! | Happu Singh | |
| 2019–2026 | Happu Ki Ultan Paltan | Happu Singh | Lead role |

== Awards and recognition ==
Tripathi won the Indian Television Academy Award for Best Actor in a Supporting Role (2019) and the Indian Telly Awards for Best Actor in a Comic Role (Male) - Jury (2019) for his performance in Bhabiji Ghar Par Hain!.

== See also ==
- List of Indian television actors
