= Saanand Verma =

Indian film and television actor

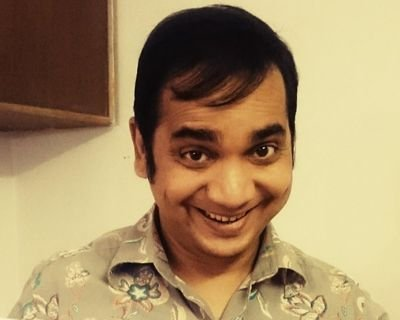
- Born: Patna, Bihar, India
- Occupation: Film actor
- Years active: 2010 – present

Saanand Verma is an Indian film and television actor. He has appeared in a number of films, television series, as well as advertising films. He is known for portraying the role of "Anokhelal Saxena" in &TV sitcom Bhabi Ji Ghar Par Hain.

== Filmography ==
=== Films ===
Year	Title	Role	Notes
2014	Mardaani	Kapil	
2018	Raid	Suraj Singh	
2018	Pataakha	Tharki Patel	
2019	Chhichhore	Hostel Staff	
2021	Ram Singh Charlie	Event manager	
2021	Raat Baaki Hai	Driver Manohar	
2021	Helmet	Shambhu	
2021	Hum Do Hamare Do	Shadiram	
2022	Babli Bouncer	Jaggi Paaji	
2022	Thank God	Akshat Gupta	
2022	Life's Good	peon at post office	
2022	India Lockdown	Tipu	
2023	Acting Ka Bhoot	Pankaj	
2023	Mission Raniganj	Timepass Man	
2024	Vijay 69	Corrupt journalist	
2025	Aankhon Ki Gustaakhiyan	Saukhilal	
2025	Mastiii 4	Cameo	
2026	Bhabiji Ghar Par Hain! Fun On The Run	Anokhelal Saxena	

=== Television ===
Year	Title	Role	Notes
2009	Yeh Chanda Kanoon Hai	Various characters	
2009	Lapataganj	Various characters	
2012	CID	Lab assistant	
2013–2015	F.I.R.	Various characters	
2015–2026	Bhabiji Ghar Par Hain!	Anokhelal Saxena	
2016	Gupp Chupp	Vivek Kumar Kohli	
2018–2022	Apharan	Satyanarayan Dubey	
2019	Sacred Games	Purushottam Baria	
2025	First Copy	Sawan	
