= Bhabiji Ghar Par Hain! Fun on the Run =

2026 Indian film directed by Shashank Bali

- Theatrical release poster
- Directed by: Shashank Bali
- Screenplay by: Raghuvir Shekhawat; Shashank Bali; Sanjay Kohli; Additional screenplay: Vihaan Kohli
- Dialogues by: Raghuvir Shekhawat
- Story by: Raghuvir Shekhawat; Shashank Bali; Sanjay Kohli
- Based on: Bhabiji Ghar Par Hain!
- Produced by: Sanjay Kohli; Binaiferr Kohli
- Starring: Aasif Sheikh; Rohitashv Gour; Shubhangi Atre; Vidisha Srivastava; Ravi Kishan; Mukesh Tiwari; Dinesh Lal Yadav
- Cinematography: Arjun Kukreti
- Edited by: Sanjay Sankla
- Music by: Vishal Shelke
- Production companies: Zee Studios; Zee Cinema; Edit II Productions
- Distributed by: Zee Studios
- Release date: 6 February 2026
- Running time: 135 minutes
- Country: India
- Language: Hindi
- Budget: est. ₹8–10 crore
- Box office: est. ₹1.32 crore

Bhabiji Ghar Par Hain! Fun on the Run (transl. Is Sister-in-Law at Home! Fun on the Run) is a 2026 Indian Hindi-language comedy drama film directed by Shashank Bali. It is presented by Zee Studios and produced under Edit II Productions and Zee Cinema, the film stars Aasif Sheikh, Rohitashv Gour, Shubhangi Atre, Vidisha Srivastava, Ravi Kishan, Mukesh Tiwari and Dinesh Lal Yadav. It is based on the television series Bhabiji Ghar Par Hain! (2015).

== Plot ==
The film follows the comedic rivalry between neighbours Vibhuti Mishra and Manmohan Tiwari, who are both infatuated with each other’s wives, Angoori and Anita. The chaos escalates when the couples embark on a road trip to Uttarakhand and encounter two eccentric gangster brothers, Shanti and Kranti. After a scuffle leaves Shanti with a scalp injury, he and his brother become obsessed with Angoori and Anita, leading to a series of slapstick chases, disguises, and absurd situations as they plot to eliminate Vibhuti and Tiwari in order to marry the women. The film blends the sitcom’s signature humour with over-the-top gags and a nostalgic road-trip adventure.

== Cast ==
- Aasif Sheikh as Vibhuti Narayan Mishra
- Rohitashv Gour as Manmohan Tiwari
- Shubhangi Atre as Angoori Manmohan Tiwari
- Vidisha Srivastava as Anita Vibhuti Narayan Mishra
- Ravi Kishan as Shanti Sharma
- Mukesh Tiwari as Kranti Sharma
- Dinesh Lal Yadav as Baccho Bhaiya
- Soma Rathod as Ramkali Tiwari
- Brijendra Kala as Master jee; Angoori 's Mama Ji
- Mushtaq Khan as Bachho 's father
- Anup Upadhyay as David Mishra
- Vaibhav Mathur as Teeka
- Saleem Zaidi as Tillu
- Yogesh Tripathi as Happu Singh
- Saanand Verma as Anokhelal Saxena
- Nitin Jadhav as Manohar the constable
- Vishwajeet Soni as Prem Choudhary
- Jeetu Gupta as Doctor Gupta
- Naveen Bawa as Doctor
- Sumit Arora as Video tutorial doctor
- Shivam Malhotra as Masala Seller in Ad which played Between video tutorial

== Production ==
The film was announced by Zee Studios, with Shashank Bali signed as the director. Rohitashv Gour, Vidisha Srivastava, Shubhangi Atre and Aasif Sheikh were confirmed to appear in the film. In March 2025, Ravi Kishan and Mukesh Tiwari joined the cast of the film.

Principal photography began and concluded in March 2025. The film was shot in Dehradun and Mussoorie for 20 days.

== Soundtrack ==
Track listing
No.	Title	Lyrics	Music	Singer(s)	Length
1.	"Manjogi"	Ghulam Mohd. Khavar	Vishal Shelke	Sonu Nigam	3:04

== Release ==
The film premiered on 6 February 2026 in Indian theatres.

== Reception ==
The film received negative reviews from critics. Vinamra Mathur of Firstpost rated it 2 stars out of 5 and wrote, "It has been more than a decade and the two philandering husbands are still comically lusting for the other woman. It feels like Abbas-Mustan’s Ajnabee inhaled the laughing gas of Housefull." Sana Farzeen of India Today rated it 2.5/5 stars and said that "Still, as a breezy, no-pressure comedy meant purely for laughs, it does its job. If you are in the mood to switch off, recognise familiar faces and chuckle at familiar jokes, this film delivers exactly that — nothing more, nothing less."

Dhaval Roy of The Times of India gave 1.5 stars out of 5 and writes that "The film can’t recreate the same charm that works on television, and is best skipped." Bollywood Hungama rated it 1.5/5 stars and said that "On the whole, BHABIJI GHAR PAR HAIN is a pale shadow of the TV show, offering neither its wit nor its consistent laughs. The overuse of toilet humour and weak writing drag the film down further."

Rishabh Suri of Hindustan Times gave 1.5 stars out of 5 and said that "Overall, Bhabiji Ghar Par Hain! leans heavily on the audience’s affection for the show, but affection alone cannot replace craft. While the characters remain endearing in parts, the screenplay offers nothing new to justify the jump from television to cinema."
