= Happu Ki Ultan Paltan =

Indian sitcom television series

- Genre: Sitcom
- Created by: Binaifer S. Kohli
- Written by: Raghuvir Shekhawat
- Screenplay by: Shashank Bali; Sanjay R. Kohli; Raghuvir Shekhawat
- Story by: Manoj Santoshi; Sanjay R. Kohli
- Directed by: Shashank Bali
- Creative director: Harshada Pranav Pathak (Potnis)
- Country of origin: India
- Original language: Hindi
- No. of episodes: 1760

Production
- Producers: Sanjay R. Kohli; Binaifer S. Kohli
- Cinematography: Raja Stankar
- Editors: Mayur.D.Bhimani; Pravesh J. Shetty
- Camera setup: Multi-camera
- Running time: 20–22 minutes
- Production company: Edit II Productions

Original release
- Network: &TV
- Release: 4 March 2019 – 13 March 2026

Related
- Bhabiji Ghar Par Hain!

Happu Ki Ultan Paltan (transl. Happu's Weird Life) is an Indian Hindi-language sitcom television series that premiered on 4 March 2019 on &TV. Produced under Edit II Productions, it is a spin-off of Bhabiji Ghar Par Hain!. Apart from the character Happu Singh, the show features his mother, wife, and nine children.

== Plot ==
Happu Singh is a corrupt police officer in the city of Kanpur. The story revolves around the misadventures of Happu Singh and his large family- his wife; Rajesh Singh, mother Katori and his nine children. He is constantly troubled by the rivalry between his wife and mother and the antics of his best friend; Beni and his nine children who are Katori 'Kat', Mallai ‘Mallaika’, Ranbir, Hritik, Chamchi, Ayushman and three other kids who are infants.

== Cast ==
- Yogesh Tripathi as Daroga (Police Inspector) Happu Singh (2019–2026), a corrupt and incompetent police officer living in Kanpur with his wife, mother, and nine children. He is constantly troubled by the rivalry between his wife and mother and often takes bribes.
- Kamna Pathak as Rajesh Singh (2019–2023), Happu's wife, who is level-headed and often the voice of reason in the household. She shares a strained relationship with her mother-in-law but cares for her.
  - Geetanjali Mishra as Rajesh Singh (2023–2026), replacing Kamna Pathak.
- Himani Shivpuri as Katori Devi Singh (2019–2026), Happu's mother, known for her domineering nature and frequent conflicts with her daughter-in-law.
- Sanjay Choudhary as Kamlesh (2019–2024) and Sonu (2025–2026), with Kamlesh being Katori's husband and Sonu his twin brother with a contrasting personality.
- Ashna Kishore as Katori Singh "Kat" (2019–2022), Happu's eldest daughter.
  - Gazal Sood as Katori Singh "Kat" (2023–2024), replacing Ashna Kishore.
- Zahara Sethjiwala as Malaika Singh (2019–2021), Happu's second daughter.
  - Jasneet Kaur Kant as Malaika Singh (2021–2022), replacing Zahara Sethjiwala.
    - Sonal Panwar as Malaika Singh (2022–2026), replacing Jasneet Kaur Kant.
- Vishwanath Chatterjee as Advocate Beni Prasad Singh (2019–2026), Happu's childhood friend and neighbour.
- Sapna Sikawar as Bimlesh Prasad Singh (2021–2025), Beni's wife and Rajesh's sister.
- Aryan Prajapati as Hritik Singh (2019–2026), Happu's mischievous son.
- Zaara Warsi as Chamchi Singh (2019–2026), Happu's youngest daughter.
- Sharad Vyas as Khodi Lal Singh (2019–2026), Happu's deceased father who appears as a spirit.
- Somya Azad as Ranbir Singh (2019–2026), Happu's eldest son.
- Kishore Bhanushali as Commissioner Resham Pal Singh (2019–2026), reprising his role from Bhabiji Ghar Par Hain!.
- Arnav Tata as Ayushmaan Singh (2019–2026), Happu's studious son.
- Saheb Das Manikpuri as Rajesh's father (2021–2026)
- Jeetu Gupta as Dr. Gupta, reprising his role from Bhabiji Ghar Par Hain!.
- Rajeev Mehra as Makmal Makhwana, a commissioner-turned-constable, reprising his role from Bhabiji Ghar Par Hain!
- Nitin Jhadav as Manohar, a constable at the police station.
- Vijay Kumar Singh as Master Bhoop Singh, a teacher, reprising his role from Bhabiji Ghar Par Hain!.
- Charul Malik as Rusa (2021), the Commissioner's sister-in-law.
- Sohit Soni as Raj and various characters.
- Urmila Sharma as Avdhesh (2025–2026), Rajesh's mother.
- Nishkarsh Dixit as Monty (2026)

== Production ==
=== Development ===
Initially titled Happu Ke Chappu, it was later changed to Happu Ki Ultan Paltan.

Talking about the series, producer Sanjay Kohli said, "Happu Singh has been a favorite among viewers ever since the inception of the character in the hugely popular Bhabiji Ghar Par Hai. This huge fan following for Happu encouraged us to come up with a show revolving around his life at home and it’s sure to entertain the audience. Happu Ki Ultan Paltan will capture the hilarious situations that will take place in Happu’s home with his dabang wife, nagging mother and his nine pesky kids, with helpless Happu in the centre of all their madness. We are positive that viewers will love this show and laugh along".

== See also ==
- List of Hindi comedy shows
