= Hum Aapke Hain In Laws =

Indian sitcom series

- Genre: Sitcom
- Written by: Ashwni Dhir and Rajesh Chawla
- Directed by: Dharram Verma
- Starring: See below
- Music by: Abhijeet Hegdepatil
- Opening theme: "Hum Aapke Hain In Laws" by Abhijeet Hegdepatil
- Country of origin: India
- Original language: Hindi
- No. of seasons: 1
- No. of episodes: 104

Production
- Executive producers: Mukesh Dhir & Ramashish Pal
- Producers: Garima Dhir, Jalaj Dhir, and Kamal Kalra
- Editors: Shaikh Nazir & Sandeep Naidu
- Camera setup: Multi-camera
- Running time: Approx. 24 minutes
- Production company: Garima Productions

Original release
- Network: SAB TV
- Release: 14 January – 7 June 2013

Hum Aapke Hain In Laws (transl. We are your in-laws) is a Hindi language fictional comedy series which premiered on 14 January 2013 on SAB TV. The series is produced by Garima Productions and stars Karan Grover and Pooja Pihal in the main leads. The story centers on a newly married couple who buy their dream home next to their In-laws and experience daily tensions.

== Plot ==
Hum Aapke Hain In laws is all about the blessings, lessons, suggestions and tensions associated with in-laws. The story revolves around Damini Grover and Gulshan Grover living in a semi-posh row-house society but in this society their neighbours are not just neighbours, they are their in-laws.

== Cast ==
- Karan Grover as Gulshan Roshanlal Grover
- Pooja Pihal as Damini Sethi Grover
- Neev Ritesh Jain as Karan Grover
- Gopi Bhalla as Sher Singh
- Aasif Sheikh as Colonel Uddham Rai Sethi (U.R. Sethi)
- Rohitash Gaud as Pandit Roshanlal Grover
- Anup Upadhyay as Kewal Kumar Johar; Jolly 's husband, Colonel 's brother-in-law Fufaji
- Shreya More as Baby ji (Roshanlal's wife)
- Priyamvada Kant as Mithu Sethi, Colonel's younger daughter, Damini's sister
