= Shubhangi Atre =

Indian television actress (born 1981)

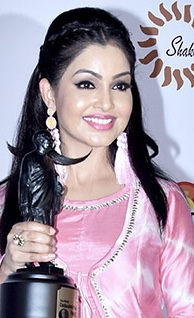
- Atre in 2018
- Born: 11 April 1981 (age 45)
- Education: MBA
- Occupation: Actress
- Years active: 2007–present
- Known for: Kasautii Zindagii Kay; Kasturi; Do Hanson Ka Jodaa; Bhabiji Ghar Par Hain!
- Spouse: Peeyush Poorey (m. 2003; div. 2025)
- Children: 1

Shubhangi Atre (born 11 April 1981) is an Indian television actress. Atre debuted in acting with Kasautii Zindagii Kay. She is known for her roles in Kasturi, Do Hanson Ka Jodaa and Bhabiji Ghar Par Hain!.

== Early life ==
Atre was born on 11 April 1981. She hails from Indore and has an MBA degree (Master of Business Administration).

== Career ==
Before coming to the TV industry, Atre shot for a shampoo brand (regional product). It was an ad for print.

After marriage, she started her acting career in 2007, when producer Ekta Kapoor gave her a role in Kasautii Zindagii Kay. She was then seen in a lead role in Kasturi. After that, she played a negative character in Havan. In 2013, Atre replaced Shilpa Shinde in popular sitcom Chidiya Ghar. Coincidentally, she again replaced her three years later, in April 2016, as Angoori Manmohan Tiwari in the show Bhabiji Ghar Par Hain! on &TV. The same year, she also portrayed the role of Devsena in Adhuri Kahaani Hamari on &TV. Eventually, she became a household name from Bhabiji Ghar Par Hai!.

Shilpa Shinde, who was playing the character of Angoori, made an allegation that Atre was copying her. To clarify this, Atre said that she was adopting the mannerisms of Angoori, and was not copying Shinde. Atre also said:

People tell me that when they close their eyes and picture Angoori bhabhi, they think of me and say, ‘Hum bhool gaye pehle kaun thi’ (We have forgotten about the earlier one) — and that for me is the biggest compliment.

After Chidiyaghar, Atre replaced Shinde for the second time in her career. About picking the offer to do comedy serial Bhabiji Ghar Par Hain!, Atre said:

Honestly, at that point, I had three offers, two were brand new shows and one was Bhabi Ji Ghar Par Hai!. Even my husband, who always supports me, felt that I shouldn’t be taking up a show where I was replacing someone. But I used to watch it and I loved it. I think it was a game-changer, a comedy that had adult content but was not vulgar.

Atre received mixed reviews from audiences for portraying "Angoori". The Times of India praised Shubhangi Atre as 'Angoori Bhabi' by saying that she is doing a fantastic work.

== Personal life ==
Atre married Peeyush Poorey in 2003, with whom she has a daughter Ashi. After 19 years of marriage in 2022, Atre separated from her husband. On 5 February 2025 she was granted a divorce from her husband.

Her father is a retired engineer in PWD department, he used to get transferred due to work, hence Shubhangi's family has lived in many cities, some time ago her family shifted from Indore to Bhopal. Her father is a resident of Palace Orchard Phase III, located on Kolar Road, Bhopal. Her In Laws lives in Indore.

She is a music lover. She is a fan of Salman Khan.

Atre's catchphrase "Sahi Pakade Hain" (You Caught It Right) from her serial Bhabi Ji Ghar Par Hai! became popular. About the catchphrase, Atre said that:

Whenever someone says something correct, I automatically say this line (Sahi Pakade Hain) whether I am at home or with friends.

== Filmography ==
=== Films ===
| Year | Film | Role | Notes | Ref |
|---|---|---|---|---|
| 2008 | C Kkompany | Herself | Special appearance | |
| 2026 | Bhabiji Ghar Par Hain! Fun On The Run | Angoori Manmohan Tiwari | | |

=== Television ===
| Year | Serial | Role | Ref(s) |
|---|---|---|---|
| 2007 | Kasautii Zindagii Kay | Palchhin Verma | |
| 2007–09 | Kasturi | Kasturi Chawla Sabharwal | |
| 2007 | Karam Apnaa Apnaa | Kasturi | Guest |
| 2008 | Kumkum – Ek Pyara Sa Bandhan | Kasturi | Guest |
| 2008 | Jalwa Four 2 Ka 1 | Contestant | |
| 2009 | Yeh Rishta Kya Kehlata Hai | Kasturi | Guest |
| 2009–2010 | Do Hanson Ka Jodaa | Preeti | |
| 2011–2012 | Havan | Trishna | |
| 2013–2014 | Chidiya Ghar | Koyal | |
| 2014 | Savdhaan India | Seema | |
| 2015–2016 | Adhuri Kahaani Hamari | Devsena | |
| 2015 | Gulmohar Grand | Kadambari | Special Experience |
| 2015 | Stories by Rabindranath Tagore | Kamala | Episode role |
| 2016–2025 | Bhabiji Ghar Par Hain! | Angoori Manmohan Tiwari | |

== Awards ==
| Year | Award | Category | Show | Result | Ref |
|---|---|---|---|---|---|
| 2016 | ITA Awards | Best Actress (Comedy) | Bhabiji Ghar Par Hain! | Won | |
| 2017 | ITA Awards | Best Actress (Comedy) | Bhabiji Ghar Par Hain! | Won | |
| 2018 | ITA Awards | Best Actress (Comedy) | Bhabiji Ghar Par Hain! | Won | |
| 2019 | Indian Telly Awards | Best Actress in a Comic Role (Jury) | Bhabiji Ghar Par Hain! | Won | |
| 2019 | ITA Awards | Best Actress (Comedy) | Bhabiji Ghar Par Hain! | Won | |
| 2021 | Gold Comedy Awards | Best Actor Female | Bhabiji Ghar Par Hain! | Won | |
| 2024 | ITA Awards | Best Actress (Comedy) | Bhabiji Ghar Par Hain! | Won | |
| 2025 | Indian Telly Awards | Best Actress in a Comic Role | Bhabiji Ghar Par Hain! | Won | |

== See also ==
- List of Hindi television actresses
