= Kasturi (2007 TV series) =

- Created by: Ekta Kapoor
- Written by: Vipul Mehta; Nishikant Roy; Gauri Kodimala; Salil Sand; Dialogue: Sharad Tripathi
- Screenplay by: Sonali Jaffar
- Story by: Mrinal Jha
- Directed by: Muzammil Desai
- Creative director: Nivedita Basu
- Starring: See Below
- Opening theme: "Kasturi" by Shreya Ghoshal
- Country of origin: India
- Original language: Hindi
- No. of seasons: 1
- No. of episodes: 350

Production
- Executive producer: Tanveer Alam
- Producers: Ekta Kapoor; Shobha Kapoor
- Cinematography: Sanjay K. Memane; Suhas Shirodkar; Rajan Singh
- Editors: Vikas Sharma; Lalit Tiwari; Sandeep Bhatt; Nishit Shah; Kamal Prasad Bhattarai
- Running time: 22 minutes
- Production company: Balaji Telefilms

Original release
- Network: STAR Plus
- Release: 23 April 2007 – 31 March 2009

Kasturi is an Indian soap opera that aired on STAR Plus channel from 23 April 2007 through 31 March 2009. It starred Shubhangi Atre and Karan Patel in the lead roles. The soap opera was created by Ekta Kapoor and was produced by her production company Balaji Telefilms.

== Plot ==
Kasturi is a story that revolves around the life of Kasturi Chawla, a young woman from a middle-class background. After completing her university education, she begins working for Robbie Sabharwal, a spoiled and arrogant rockstar who is immensely popular.

At first, Robbie and Kasturi clash due to their contrasting social classes, values, and morals. However, as they spend more time together, they develop feelings for each other and profess their love. Unfortunately, their relationship does not last long as a misunderstanding arises, causing Robbie to believe that Kasturi is cheating on him with his best friend, Raunak.

Following their breakup, Raunak proposes to Kasturi, and after some hesitation, she accepts. On the day of their wedding, Robbie discovers that he misunderstood Kasturi and Raunak's relationship. He apologizes and begs Kasturi to reconcile, but she rejects him, citing his constant lack of trust.

Raunak and Kasturi's wedding is followed by a series of events in which Robbie tries to sabotage their relationship. However, his attempts backfire, bringing Raunak and Kasturi closer. Tragically, Raunak dies in an accident, leading Kasturi to believe that Robbie is responsible. Seeking revenge, Kasturi marries Robbie under the pretense of moving on and makes his life living hell. Robbie ends up in a coma, seemingly confirming her victory. However, Kasturi is shocked when she encounters Raunak, who is alive and well in Malaysia.

Raunak reveals that he had been manipulating Kasturi all along. He resented Robbie's fame and popularity and wanted to hurt him by marrying Kasturi and framing Robbie for murder. Raunak's accomplice turns out to be Robbie's sister, Shivani, who despises Robbie and is in love with Raunak. They inform Kasturi that their plan now involves killing Robbie to inherit his wealth.

Kasturi returns to India and learns that Robbie despises her for making him suffer for a crime he didn't commit. However, circumstances lead to Robbie and Kasturi reuniting, but Raunak continues to torment Kasturi as she is the only one aware of his true intentions. More twists and turns follow, including the revelation that Robbie's aunt, Maasi, is colluding with Raunak. Kasturi is shot and falls off a cliff, losing her mental balance.

Robbie allows Kasturi to stay in his house, but she behaves like a child and has no memory of her past. Eventually, Raunak's true nature is exposed to everyone, and he is sent to prison. However, Maasi's involvement remains unknown. Another accident restores Kasturi's sanity, and she and Robbie reunite once again.

During the preparations for their wedding, a businessman named Kabir Dhanrajgir enters the story. Kasturi discovers that a significant portion of Robbie's property has been sold with Kabir's involvement. He blackmails her, demanding that she marry him to rectify the situation. On the day of her wedding, Kasturi leaves Robbie and marries Kabir.

Robbie resorts to self-destructive behavior to cope with his pain, while Kasturi realizes that Kabir is a kind-hearted man but struggles to connect with his children. Robbie discovers that Kabir is a murderer who killed his three previous wives and tries to rescue Kasturi from the situation. Kabir dies by falling off a cliff, and Kasturi learns the truth after his death.

Robbie wishes to marry Kasturi again, but his mother, Devika, blames Kasturi for ruining his life. Feeling rejected, Kasturi leaves without informing anyone and goes to live with her friend, Sanchi. Robbie searches for Kasturi but is unable to find her, leading him to confront his mother about their separation. Kasturi starts working in the office of Gayatri Devi, where she meets three brothers—Abhi, Ajay, and Adwit—and helps them with their problems. Robbie, deeply saddened by thoughts of Kasturi, receives encouragement from his father to resume his singing career.

The story culminates with an event organized by Kasturi's employers, where they request Robbie to perform. Kasturi is present at the event, and as Abhi calls out to Robbie, he confesses that he has stopped singing. In that moment, both Kasturi and Robbie realize their feelings for each other. Ultimately, Kasturi and Robbie reunite in marriage, and everything falls into place.

== Cast ==
- Shubhangi Atre as Kasturi Chawla / Kasturi Raunak Singhania / Kasturi Robbie Sabharwal / Kasturi Kabir Dhanrajgir / Kasturi Girish Gill
- Karan Patel as Robbie Sabharwal (Kasturi's second and fourth husband)
- Bharat Chawda as Abhimanyu Singhania
- Nandish Sandhu / Jatin Shah as Raunak Singhania (Kasturi's first husband)
- Mohnish Behl as Kabir Dhanrajgir (Kasturi's third husband)
- Roopa Ganguly as Kaushalya Jayprakash Chawla
- Sanjay Taneja as Jayprakash (J.P.) Chawla
- Prabhat Bhattacharya as Ajay Chawla
- Amita Chandekar as Pooja Ajay Chawla
- Sai Tamhankar / Krystle D'Souza as Navneet
- Nikhil Arya / Salil Acharya as Nikhil
- Preeti Gupta as Alaana Sabharwal
- Priya Arya as Alka Chawla
- Mouni Roy as Shivani Sabharwal (Robbie's sister)
- Naman Shaw as Girish Gill
- Kamalika Guha Thakurta as Gayatri
- Sudha Chandran as Maasi (Robbie's aunt)
- Lata Haya as Shakuntala
- S. M. Zaheer as Mr. Chawla, Kasturi's grandfather
- Kanika Shivpuri as Biji
- Shivangi Sharma as Anita
- Kiku Sharda as Kiku Chawla
- Madhurima Tuli as Tanu Singhania
- Sheeba Chaddha as Devika Purushottam Sabharwal (Robbie's mother)
- Vinny Arora as Drashti
- Raja Sevak as Vishesh
- Sandeep Mehta as Purushottam Sabharwal
- Ajay Arya as Ajink
- Megha Dhade as (sachi)
- Debina Bonnerjee as Raina
- Hina Khan as Akshara (guest)
- Shweta Tiwari as Prerna
- Anjali Abrol as Rani
- Panchi Bora as Prachi

== Reception ==
Initially, it was garnering 4 TVR while in September 2007 it decreased to 2.97 TVR.
