= Shashank Bali =

Indian television director

- Born: New Delhi, India
- Occupation: Director
- Known for: Bhabi Ji Ghar Par Hai!, Jijaji Chhat Par Hai

Shashank Bali is an Indian television director. His first television directorial venture was F.I.R. (TV series), followed by Bhabi Ji Ghar Par Hai!, May I Come In Madam?, Sahib Biwi Aur Boss. Jijaji Chhat Par Hai, Happu Ki Ultan Paltan and Jijaji Chhat Parr Koii Hai.

Bali is known for directing sarcastic and dark comedy series.

== Television ==
- F.I.R. (TV series) (2006–2015)
- Bhabi Ji Ghar Par Hai! (2015–2026)
- Yeh Chanda Kanoon Hai (2009–2010), 108 episodes, co-directed with Rajan Waghdhare
- Sahib Biwi Aur Boss (2015–2016)
- May I Come In Madam? (2016)
- Jijaji Chhat Par Hai (2018–2020)
- Happu Ki Ultan Paltan (2019–2026)
- Jijaji Chhat Parr Koii Hai (2021)

== Films ==
- Bhabiji Ghar Par Hain! Fun On The Run (2026)

== Awards ==
=== Indian Telly Awards ===
| Year | Award | Result |
|---|---|---|
| 2015 | Best Director (Sitcom) | Won |

=== Indian Television Academy Awards ===
| Year | Award | Result |
|---|---|---|
| 2016 | Best Director – Comedy (Jury) | Won |
