= Charul Malik =

Indian news anchor and actress

- Charul Malik, 2011
- Born: 1985 (age 40–41); Delhi, India
- Citizenship: Indian

Charul Malik is a news anchor and actress, known for portraying Russa in Bhabiji Ghar Par Hain! and Happu Ki Ultan Paltan on &TV. She worked as an anchor and executive editor with India TV, her previous associations were with Aaj Tak as an associate editor and anchor. She quit India TV, starting her new stint as an actress.

== Early life ==
Born in Delhi in 1985 to a family from Faridabad (Haryana), her parents moved to Chandigarh just after her birth. Her father G.S. Malik is a lawyer in Punjab and Haryana High Court and mother Asha Malik, a teacher in Chandigarh. She has a twin sister named Parul and a younger brother Gaurav Malik.

After Class X, she did Class XII in arts and then went on to complete her BA (HONS) with LL.B.

Charul said she spent most of childhood days with her family watching television. During those days, Doordarshan was the only available TV channel, and Salma Sultan and Nalini Singh were her role models.

== Career ==
=== Journalism ===
Charul Malik started her career with Jain TV News Channel through an open interview and later became a news reader. Prannoy Roy and Vinod Dua have complimented her finesse in flow of speech on multiple occasions. "Their compliments have infused into me more confidence and inspiration," says Charul.

Charul has worked with Sahara Samay Channel before joining STAR News now ABP News where she had been one of the leading anchors, delivering news regularly since 2006.

=== Acting career ===
Charul has also acted in serials like Bhabiji Ghar Par Hain!.

== Awards and recognition ==
Charul has been the only anchor in the world who has conducted a live interview on Skates and the same has been accredited by the LIMCA book of records.

Charul has been conferred with the News Television Award 2014 for "The Best News Anchor Entertainment".

Charul also won the MY CITY award for the Best Entertainment News Anchor for the year 2014/15.

Charul was also nominated for the Best Anchor with the award AVTA (Asian Viewers Television Awards), where she narrowly lost to Barkha Dutt of NDTV in the final round.
