= Duniyaa Jhukti Hai =

- Directed by: Yash Chauhan
- Produced by: S. Raghunath Rao
- Production company: R.R. International
- Release date: 22 December 1994
- Country: India
- Language: Hindi

Duniyaa Jhukti Hai is a 1994 Hindi language drama film directed by Yash Chauhan and produced by S. Raghunath Rao. It was released on 22 December 1994. It stars Aasif Sheikh, Sadashiv Amrapurkar, Anupam Kher, Jamuna, Rohini in lead roles.

== Music ==
1. "Aankhon Ne Padh Li" - Udit Narayan, Kavita Krishnamurthy
2. "Maddona Dil Do Na" - Abhijeet
3. "Mein Husn Ka Saudaai"
4. "Mein Sheeshadari Tu Bijlani" - Amit Kumar, Sudesh Bhosle
5. "Nafrat Ki Duniya Se Door" - Abhijeet, Kavita Krishnamurthy
