= Ring Wrong Ring =

Indian Hindi comedy television show

- Genre: Fantasy comedy, Sitcom
- Written by: Bunty Rathore; Amit Senchoudhary; Niraj Vikram
- Screenplay by: Kumar Bhatia
- Directed by: Rajan Waghdhare
- Starring: See below
- Country of origin: India
- Original language: Hindi
- No. of seasons: 2
- No. of episodes: 83

Production
- Producers: Vipul D. Shah; Anupam K. Kalidhar; Mahim Joshie; Chahek Kapur
- Editors: Dharmesh Patel; Shadab Khan
- Running time: 20-24 minutes
- Production companies: Optimystix Entertainment; Anjaney Telefilms Pvt. Ltd.; Chitrashala Multimedia

Original release
- Network: SAB TV
- Release: 13 December 2010 - 15 June 2011

Ring Wrong Ring is an Indian sitcom that premiered on SAB TV this 13 December 2010. and concluded on 15 June 2011. It stars Muskaan Mihani, Aasif Sheikh, Ujjwal Chopra, Anita Kanwal and Rakesh Bedi.

== Plot ==
Show centers on Mansi, a housewife who inherits a peculiar gift from her deceased father-in-law, Dinanath Chouhan: a magical ring. Dinanath, a magician by profession, created this ring with the power to grant wishes. However, a flaw in its creation causes the magic to manifest in unpredictable and often comedic ways. Mansi uses the ring with the intention of resolving daily issues and pleasing her family. This family includes her husband, Vijay, who remains blissfully unaware of the ring's existence and the ensuing chaos. This lack of awareness provides a constant source of comedic tension as Mansi struggles to conceal the magical mishaps. Also in the family is Ajay, Mansi's brother-in-law, who is similarly kept in the dark about the ring, further complicating Mansi's efforts.

Adding another layer to the family dynamic is Gayatri, Mansi's mother-in-law, a traditional and somewhat demanding figure who inadvertently adds pressure to Mansi as she juggles her wishes and the secret of the ring. Even in death, Dinanath Chouhan plays a role, appearing in a photo frame and interacting with Mansi, offering guidance (though often not very helpful) regarding the ring's erratic magic. The show's narrative structure generally involves Mansi making a wish in each episode, followed by the resulting humorous and often absurd side effects that ripple through her family. Ring Wrong Ring presents a comedic exploration of wish fulfillment, emphasizing the potential for unintended consequences when magic doesn't operate as expected, all within the context of a close-knit family dynamic.

== Cast ==
- Muskaan Mihani as Mansi Chouhan is married to Vijay, the sister-in-law of Ajay, the daughter-in-law of Gayatri, and the daughter-in-law of the deceased Dinanath Chouhan.
- Aasif Sheikh as Vijay Chouhan is the husband of Mansi, the brother of Ajay, and the son of Gayatri and deceased Dinanath Chouhan.
- Ujjwal Chopra as Ajay is the brother of Vijay, the brother-in-law of Mansi, and the son of Gayatri and deceased Dinanath Chouhan.
- Anita Kanwal as Gayatri was married to the deceased Dinanath Chouhan, mother of Vijay and Ajay, and the mother-in-law of Mansi.
- Rakesh Bedi as Dinanath Chouhan is the deceased husband of Gayatri, father of Vijay and Ajay, and the deceased father-in-law of Mansi.
- Aryan Sharma as Bunty is Mansi's Nephew
- Harsh Khurana as Raj is the colleague of Vijay
- Delnaaz Irani as Bindu is married to Raj
- Yogesh Tripathi

== See also ==
- List of Hindi Comedy Shows
