= Mehndi Tere Naam Ki =

Indian drama television series

- Created by: AK Films
- Directed by: Nandita Mehra
- Starring: see below
- Opening theme: "Mehndi Tere Naam Ki" by Anand Raj Anand
- Country of origin: India
- Original language: Hindi
- No. of episodes: 132

Production
- Producer: Aruna Irani
- Running time: approximately 24 minutes

Original release
- Network: Zee TV
- Release: 15 March 2000 – 18 September 2002

Mehndi Tere Naam Ki was a Hindi television drama series that aired on Zee TV channel from 15 March 2000 to 18 September 2002 on every Wednesday at 8:30 P.M.. The show was produced by popular Bollywood actress Aruna Irani. Because of its popularity among audiences, the show was nominated for numerous award categories by the Indian Telly Awards (2002): Anand Raj Anand was nominated for the TV Music Director of The Year award and Aasif Sheikh was nominated for the TV Actor in a Negative Role award for his character Raj.

== Plot ==
As the title name of the series suggests, the story highlights the typical Indian dilemmas regarding matrimony. The story revolves around the life of Jayant Malik and Sharada Malik who are having major difficulties finding the best matches for their four unmarried daughters. The strange thing is that although Sharada is a matchmaker and has arranged countless matches, she is unable to find the best suited boys for her own daughters. The family goes through many trials and tribulation until all of the girls settle down.

== Cast ==
- Aruna Irani as Sharada Jayant Malik
- Satyen Kappu as Jayant Malik
- Sangeeta Ghosh as Muskaan Malik
- Meenakshi Gupta as Kajal Malik
- Purbi Joshi as Niharika "Nikki" Malik
- Urvashi Dholakia as Pooja Malik
- Amar Upadhyay as Akshat
- Nasir Khan / Manish Goel as Aman
- Siddharth Dhawan as Rahul
- Yatin Karyekar as Rahul's Father
- Raman Kapoor as Nikhil
- Pooja Ghai Rawal
- Aasif Sheikh as Raj
- Sanjeev Seth as Akash
- Swati Chitnis as Savita
- Arun Bakshi
- Neelam Mehra as Usha
- Manjeet Kullar as Meeta Raheja
- Yusuf Hussain as Akshat's Grandfather
