= Chidiya Ghar =

Television series

- Genre: Sitcom
- Written by: Ashwni Dhir; Mayank Vohra; Sunny Munshi
- Starring: See below
- Music by: Abhijeet Hegdepatil
- Country of origin: India
- Original language: Hindi
- No. of episodes: 1,522

Production
- Producer: Ashwni Dhir
- Running time: 21 minutes
- Production company: Garima Productions

Original release
- Network: SAB TV
- Release: 28 November 2011 – 2 October 2017

Chidiya Ghar (Hindi pronunciation: [t͡ʃɪ.ɽɪ.jɑː ɡʱəɾ]; transl. Zoo) is a sitcom which aired on Sony SAB from 28 November 2011 to 2 October 2017. The series was produced by Ashwni Dhir under the banner of Garima Productions. The show gets its name "Chidiya Ghar" because Chidiya Ghar means "zoo" in Hindi as all the characters in this show have animal names of the hindi language.

== Premise ==
Chidiya Ghar is a house in Banaras named after Mrs. Chidiya Kesari Narayan, late wife of retired principal, Shri Kesari Narayan. The story is about Kesari, his sons, Ghotak and Gomukh their respective wives, Koyal and Mayuri, younger son Kapi and his wife Chuhiya, grandchildren Gillu, Gaj, Machar, Makhi and daughter Maina, son-in-law Totaram, sister Billo, servant Gadha Prasad, his wife Naagin/Markati and brother Mendak Prasad. Their names resemble animals and each individual bears some animal's characteristic and Kesari always teaches them a lesson being helpful in the future, after passing the problems of the same lessons. Their colony was named "Chidiya Ghar" in the honor of Kesari Narayan's contributions. It consists of Deemak Chacha, Girgit Mausi, her husband Bhed Vajpayee, their daughter Titli, her lover Tommy and his friend Puppy.

Through this show, Kesari Narayan i.e. Baabuji of Chidiya Ghar teaches educational values which he calls "Sanskaar". Each story starts with Kesari teaching an idiom through his Chidiyaghar Pathshala, and an incident happens where the idiom comes true.

== Cast ==
=== Main ===
- Rajendra Gupta as Kesari Narayan (Lion), "Baabuji" of Chidiya Ghar. (2011–2017)
- Mamta Gurnani as Chidiya Kesari Narayan (Sparrow), Wife of Kesari Narayan (2011–2017)
  - Maina (Starling), Daughter of Kesari and Chidiya. (2011–2017)
- Paresh Ganatra as Ghotak Kesari Narayan (Horse), Eldest son of Kesari and Chidiya. (2011–2017)
- Shilpa Shinde as Koyal Ghotak Narayan (Nightingale), Wife of Ghotak. Shinde left the show in 2013 but came back in 2014, She again left the show after few months. (2011–2013, 2014)
  - Shubhangi Atre Poorey as Koyal Ghotak Narayan, Poorey replaced Shinde in 2013. (2013–2014)
  - Aditi Sajwan as Koyal Ghotak Narayan, Sajwan replaced Shinde in 2014. (2014–2017)
- Sumit Arora as Gomukh Kesari Narayan (Cow), Son of Kesari and Chidiya. (2011–2017)
- Debina Bonnerjee as Mayuri Gomukh Narayan (Peahen), Gowmukh's wife (2011–2014)
  - Shafaq Naaz as Mayuri Gomukh Narayan, Naaz replaced Bonnerjee in 2014. (2014–2017)
- Arshiya Mankar as Child Gajgamini Gomukh Narayan / Gaj (Elephant), Gomukh and Mayuri's daughter. (2011–2012)
  - Rajvi Suchak as Teenage Gajgamini Gomukh Narayan / Gaj (Elephant), Gomukh and Mayuri's daughter (2012–2017)
  - Anjita Poonia as Adult Gajgamini Gomukh Narayan / Gaj. (2017)
- Saraansh Verma as Kapi Kesari Narayan (Monkey), youngest son of Kesari and Chidiya. (2011–2017)
- Jitu Shivhare as Gaddha Prasad (Donkey), Servant of Chidiya Ghar later turned family member. (2011–2017)
- Mandakini Shrivastava as Naagin Gaddha Prasad (Snake), first wife of Gadhaprasad (2011–2015)
- Pratham Shetty as Teenage Gillendra Ghotak Narayan / Gillu (Squirrel), Ghotak and Koyal's son. (2011–2017)
  - Bhavin Bhanushali as Adult Gillendra Ghotak Narayan / Gillu (2017)
- Manish Vishwakarma as Mendak Prasad (Frog), Smaller brother of Gadhaprasad (2011–2015)
- Trishikha Ashish Tripathi as Chuhiya Kapi Narayan (Mouse), Wife of Kapi (2015–2017)
- Isharat Ali as Deemak Sharma "Deemak Sharma" (Termite) (2015–2017)
- Manju Sharma as Girgit Mausi (Chameleon), wife of Bhed, daughter of Chipkali (2015–2017)
- Sheetal Pandya as Titli (Butterfly), daughter of Girgit Mausi (2015–2017)
- Abhay Pratap Singh as Tommy Tiwari, Titli's lover (2015–2017)
- Sanjay Chaudhary as Puppy, friend of Tommy and koyal's admirer (2015–2017)
- Arti Kandpal as Markati Gaddha Prasad (Monkey), second wife of Gadhaprasad (2016–2017)

=== Recurring ===
- Bharati Achrekar as Billo Bua (Cat), younger Sister of Kesari. (2011–2017)
- Arya Nambiar as Memna, Kapi's friend and love interest. (2011–2013; 2016; 2017)
- Jarnail Singh as Balwan (2011–2017)
- Aasif Sheikh as Pappi Luthra "Pappi Bhaisaab"; Kitti's husband, Jerry's father (2012)
- Tapasya Nayak as Kitti; Pappi Bhaisaab's wife, Jerry's mother (2012)
- Umesh Bajpai as Various characters (2012–2017)
- Jayshree Soni as Macchli (Fish). (2013–2014)
- Drisha Kalyani as Cheeti (Ant), Adopted daughter of Ghotak. (2013–2014)
- Sulbha Arya as Chamunda, elder sister of Kesari. (2014–2017)
- Ketan Karande as Sandeshwar Mama (Saandhu Mama) (Bull), Brother of Chidiya (2015–2016)
- Melissa Pais as Hirni (Deer), Servant of Chopra and Gadhaprasad's later love interest / Various characters (2015–2016; 2017)
- Prasad Barve as Chamkadar (Bat), Nephew of Gadhaprasad. (2017)

=== Guest ===
- Sanjay Mishra as Baba who gave the introduction to the show. (2011)
- Rohitash Gaud as Ramleela actor who appeared as Pandit, maulana and priest. (2011)
  - Mukundilal Gupta from Lapataganj. (2012)
- Mushtaq Khan as Madhukant Narayan, Kesari's younger brother. (2011)
- Gopi Bhalla as Head Constable Gopinath Gandotra from F.I.R. (2012)
- Kiku Sharda as Constable Mulayam Singh Gulgule from F.I.R. (2012)
- Anup Upadhyay as Chhotu Mama from Lapataganj. (2012)
- Krishna Bhatt as Elizabeth Yadav from Lapataganj. (2012)
- Rakesh Srivastav as Lallan from Lapataganj. (2012)
- Sunil Singh as Suttilal from Lapataganj. (2012)
- Soma Rathod as Mircha from Lapataganj. (2012)
- Shreyas Talpade as himself to promote Kamaal Dhamaal Malamaal. (2012)
- Nyra Banerjee as herself to promote Kamaal Dhamaal Malamaal. (2012)
- Yogesh Tripathi as Chatur Mama (2013)
- Surjit Saha as Rajveer (2014)
- Rucha Gujarathi as Kishmish (2015; 2016)
- Rakhi Sawant as Rakhee Fox (2015)
- Ami Trivedi as Leelawati, spirit in Chidiya Ghar house whose marriage proposal was earlier rejected by Kesari. (2015)
- Ali Asgar as Nathu Nkabandi from Woh Teri Bhabhi Hai Pagle. (2016)
- Anang Desai as Raja Markat (2016)
- Irrfan Khan as himself to promote Madaari. (2016)
- Kunika as Rita Mausi, Mayuri's aunt. (2016)
- Prem Chopra as Prem Prakash, Kesari's uncle from Dubai. (2016)
- Manav Gohil as Manav, Gowmukh's School Friend. (2016)
- Himanshu Soni as Krishna (2016)
- Riteish Deshmukh as himself to promote Bank Chor (2017)
- Nitesh Pandey as Hari Om Mama, Koyal's uncle. (2017)
- Kishwer Merchant as Sheela Kejwani, vice principal of Eanvois school. (2017)

== Awards and nominations ==
| Year | Awards | Category | Recipient(s) | Result |
|---|---|---|---|---|
| 2012 | Indian Telly Awards | Best Actor in a Comic Role | Paresh Ganatra | Nominated |
| 2015 | Indian Telly Awards | Best Actor in a Supporting Role (Comedy) | Paresh Ganatra | Nominated |

== Other media ==
A music video Gadhe Ka Style, directed by Hiten and choreographed by Ahmed Khan was released in 2013. The music of the video was composed by KK and Rinum Jain and it was sung by Bappi Lahri.

Comics based on Chidiya Ghar characters were launched as part of SAB Ke Comics series in 2014.
