= Sajan Re Jhoot Mat Bolo =

Indian sitcom series

- Written by: Vipul D Shah; Hemant Kevani; Amit Senchoudhary; Emraan
- Directed by: Hemen Chauhan
- Creative directors: Dharampal Thakur; Ram Dixit; Nishtha Yadav
- Starring: See below
- Country of origin: India
- Original language: Hindi
- No. of seasons: 1
- No. of episodes: 478

Production
- Producers: Vipul D Shah; Sanjiv Sharma
- Running time: approx. 20 minutes
- Production company: Optimystix Entertainment

Original release
- Network: SAB TV
- Release: 14 December 2009 – 6 January 2012

Related
- Golmaal Hai Bhai Sab Golmaal Hai; Sajan Re Phir Jhoot Mat Bolo

Sajan Re Jhoot Mat Bolo (transl. Do not lie, honey), is a Hindi sitcom which aired on SAB TV from 2009 till 2012. The serial name was based on a song Sajan Re Jhoot Mat Bolo from the film Teesri Kasam. It starred Sumeet Raghavan, Mugdha Chaphekar, Anchal Sabharwal, Ami Trivedi and Tiku Talsania.

A sequel series, Sajan Re Phir Jhoot Mat Bolo starring Hussain Kuwajerwala aired from 23 May 2017 to 14 September 2018. Also a reboot series named Golmaal Hai Bhai Sab Golmaal Hai aired in 2012.

== Plot ==
Apoorva is looking for a job. He lands a job with the Dhirubhai's Global Sanskar Group of Industries. Apoorva meets Aarti (niece of Dhirubhai) and falls in love with her. Apoorva lies to Dhirubhai and Aarti about his family. Raju, Apoorva's best friend, builds up a fake family. After a month Aarti marries Apoorva. It shows how Apoorva and other family members try to hide the truth of this fake family from Dhirubhai and his niece Aarti.

Sajan Re Jhoot Mat Bolo revolves around the humor that comes from situational lies and liars. It is a situational comedy that arises from a small lie that the protagonist, Apoorva, had to tell his employer Dhirubhai Jhaveri to get a job. Dhirubhai is a successful businessman who hates lies and liars and believes in family bonding and values. His belief in these values at times crosses levels of normalcy and are unbelievably rigid. Apoorva was raised in an orphanage and, to get the job in Dhirubhai's company, lies that he has a full-fledged family in India. Apoorva's description of his imaginary family makes Dhirubhai fall in love with each and every member.

Dhirubhai has a niece Aarti, who is young, beautiful and believes in the same values as her uncle. They both trust Apoorva blindly: He has earned this trust and respect on the basis of his hard work. Over time he has become the Man Friday for Dhirubhai as well as Aarti. Apoorva has also developed a liking for Aarti but has refrained from expressing his feelings to her.

Dhirubhai fixes Aarti's marriage but, in a dramatic turn of events, it is called off at the last moment. Dhirubhai decides to marry Aarti with Apoorva. He announces that the marriage will take place in India, in the presence of Apoorva's family. Apoorva tries to convey the truth to Aarti but realizes that it will break her heart. He asks his best friend Raju to set up his fake family in India before the marriage, which has to take place in a few days.

Raju does the needful and when Apoorva arrives in India with Dhirubhai and Aarti, he comes face to face with family for the first time. From here starts a non-stop comical journey in which the family members, who are from various backgrounds, try to find their feet in their new characters and live up to Dhirubhai and Aarti's expectations. And the fake family never speaks truth to Dhirubhai.

In a series of episodes particularly for a Valentine's Day special, the family was shown on a trip to Goa. On the trip, Dhirubhai clashes with Preeti who is roaming around in modern clothes. What follows is a series of attempts by Apoorva to make him believe that doubles do exist in this world. Dhirubhai refuses to accept it but, in the end, as Apoorva is about to unfold the secret of his family, Dhirubhai meets his own look-alike and believes Apoorva. Once again the family is saved from being destroyed.

== Cast ==
- Sumeet Raghavan as Apoorva Shah
- Mugdha Chaphekar as Aarti Jhaveri Shah (2009–2011)
  - Anchal Sabharwal replaced Chaphekar in 2011.
- Ami Trivedi as Tulika Shah
- Tiku Talsania as Dhirubhai Jhaveri
- Shalini Khanna as Pallavi Shah
- Melissa Pais as Preeti Shah
- Pallavi Pradhan as Usha Dhirubhai Jhaveri
- Manoj Goyal as Pankaj Shah
- Sukesh Anand as Paresh Shah
- Apara Mehta as Damini Devi Deewan
- Rajiv Thakur as Raju/Ishwar Lal Shah
- Swapnil Joshi as Bhavesh Bhausar
- Mehul Bhojak as Mohit Kunwar Singh
- Paresh Ganatra as Natwarlaal (cameo)
- Shweta Tiwari as ACP Archana
- Navina Bole as Soniya
- Karishma Tanna as Kiran
- Drashti Dhami as Herself

== Awards and nominations ==
Year	Award	Category	Recipient	Result	Ref.
2010	Indian Telly Awards	Best Actor in a Comic Role - Jury	Sumeet Raghavan	Won	
2010	Indian Telly Awards	Best Actor in a Comic Role	Sumeet Raghavan	Nominated	
2010	Indian Telly Awards	Best Actor in a Comic Role	Rajeev Thakur	Nominated	
2010	Indian Telly Awards	Best Actress in a Comic Role	Apara Mehta	Nominated	
