= Jijaji Chhat Per Hain =

Indian television series

- Genre: Sitcom
- Written by: Manoj Santoshi; Raghuvir Shekhawat
- Directed by: Shashank Bali; Rajan Waghdhare
- Creative director: Harshada Pranav Pathak
- Starring: See below
- Country of origin: India
- Original language: Hindi
- No. of seasons: 2
- No. of episodes: 552

Production
- Producers: Sanjay Kohli; Binaifer Kohli; Shivansh Partha Laha
- Cinematography: Raja Stankar
- Editors: Rahul H Solanki; Pravesh J Shetty
- Camera setup: Multi-camera
- Running time: 23 minutes
- Production company: Edit II Productions Laha Entertainment

Original release
- Network: SAB TV
- Release: 9 January 2018 – 21 February 2020

Related
- Jijaji Chhat Parr Koii Hai

Jijaji Chhat Per Hain (transl. Brother-in-law is on the terrace) is an Indian sitcom television series that aired from 9 January 2018 to 21 February 2020 on Sony SAB. Produced by Edit II Production, it starred Hiba Nawab, Nikhil Khurana and Anup Upadhyay.

The show involves Murari, who continually tries to control his daughter, Elaichi, a street smart and free spirited girl; and Pancham, an aspiring music director, who works as a salesman in Murari's Lehenga shop, and is in love with Elaichi.

Its spiritual sequel titled Jijaji Chhat Parr Koii Hai, premiered on Sony Sab on 8 March 2021.

== Plot ==
=== Season 1 ===
Murari Lal Bansal is a lehenga shop owner in Chandni Chowk, Delhi who lives with his nagging wife Karuna and a free-spirited and outspoken daughter, Elaichi. Half of the Chandni Chowk is infatuated by Elaichi but she considers them unsuitable for her. Rebellious Elaichi has several tricks up her sleeve. She continues to go to school by intentionally flunking each year in eleventh standard but passes in her fifth attempt, to twelfth standard, at the age of 21, to avoid living the grown-up life and dodging marriage. The twist in the tale comes when Murari rents out his rooftop room (barsati) to Pancham, a 24-year-old boy from Agra who aspires to be a music director. Pancham moves to Delhi with his best friend, Pintu, both of whom have limited resources to bank on. To make his ends meet, he ends up working in Murari's shop as an assistant. Since Murari is principally determined to not rent his 'barsati' to bachelors, Pancham fakes about being married and disguises Pintu, as a woman posing as his wife. However, Elaichi figures out what is going on and takes an instant liking of Pancham's mild and innocent behaviour. The story goes on from here as Pancham tries to balance his dream of becoming a music director, his work and concealing his wife's 'secret', whereas Elaichi constantly flirts with Pancham and teases him with jokes and pranks, while Murari tries to control his daughter's behaviour in the most unsuccessful ways. Elaichi tells Pancham and Pintu that she knows the truth about Pintu and that she loves Pancham. She and Pancham marry with the consent of Elaichi's grandmother, unknown to her father Murari. Elaichi, Pancham, Pintu and Sunita solve day to day problems faced by them due to Elaichi's marriage to Pancham but due to one of Elaichi's pranks, Pancham and Pintu are thrown out of the house and shop by Murari.

=== Season 2 ===
Pancham and Pintu return, disguised as siblings Sanjana Kohli and Sanjeev Kohli respectively, to rent the house and shop on the advice of Elaichi. Chatanki and Sanjana aka Pancham get married in a fake marriage but due to increasing problems for Elaichi and Pancham after this, Elaichi plans to run away so that Pancham and Pintu can return in their original getup. Pancham and Pintu return to the house after being forgiven by Murari but due to an electric shock Pancham loses his memory and does not recognise Elaichi as his wife. He behaves with her the same way he behaved when he came the first time in Season 1. Elaichi tries to make Pancham fall for her again. Among the regular mischiefs of Elaichi, arrives Murari's friend Bansi's daughter Sargam who falls in love with Pancham. She offers him to make him settle in Canada and become a musician there, to which he accepts quickly. When Elaichi realises the affair between Pancham and Sargam, she makes plans to stop him from going to Canada but isn't successful. Dejected, she goes to a neighbourhood temple to commit suicide by hitting her head on the temple bell. When Elaichi's friend Sunita informs this to Pancham, he quickly goes to the temple, trips and gets hurt by the temple bell due to which his memory comes back. Sargam makes Pancham promise her never to leave Elaichi and to be careful while fixing the electric cables. After some days, Murari sees Pancham filling sindoor in the forehead of Elaichi. He goes to his room and gets a gun to shoot Pancham. Elaichi and her mother try to explain everything to her father. But Murari being known for his temper shoots Pancham anyway. The first shot misses. The show ends while the viewers keep guessing whether Murari shoots the second bullet or not.

== Series overview ==
Season	No. of episodes	Originally broadcast (India)	
Season	No. of episodes	First aired	Last aired
1	467	9 January 2018	18 October 2019
2	85	28 October 2019	21 February 2020

== Cast and characters ==
=== Main ===
- Hiba Nawab as Elaichi Bansal Khurana aka Ellu, Murari's daughter and Pancham's wife. She is a free-spirited, street-smart, stubborn yet fun-loving girl. Her catchphrase is "Life me tante ho rakhe hai". (2018–2020)
- Nikhil Khurana as Pancham Khurana, Elaichi's husband, a small towner from Agra, whose sole dream was to become a music director. As he continues to struggle in his music career, to make his ends meet, he starts working at Murari's shop and lives on rent in his Barsati which makes him fall directly in the purview of Elaichi's whims and pranks. (2018–2020)
- Anup Upadhyay as Murari Bansal, a Chandni Chowk lehenga shop owner and Elaichi’s father. He is not only an insecure and grumpy father but is also known to be a miser. He has an old Delhi accent, is very sarcastic in nature and is mostly seen engaged in gossips at saloon shop. He is sometimes mean in a good way and has a characteristic snickering laughter. He constantly bullies Pancham to keep him in check and makes salary cuts every time he makes a mistake but is shown to deeply care for Pancham like his own son. He is unaware of Elaichi's marriage to Pancham. He has a catchphrase "Baat kar ria hai bekaar ki". (2018–2020)
- Soma Rathod as Karuna Bansal, Murari’s wife and Elaichi’s mother. She is a typical housewife, although she might be nagging at times, she's a very dedicated and loving mother as well. She has a brother named Chatanki, whom she always helps financially even if it means stealing cash from Murari's safe. She has a hysterical laughing style which usually make others afraid. Her catchphrase is" Mere to bhaagya hi phoot gaye", and after saying that, she almost tries to weep before getting normal again. (2018–2020)
- Harveer Singh as Pintu, Pancham's best friend and Sunita's love interest, who came along with Pancham to get a job in Delhi. But, due to Murari's stipulation, most of the times he is seen dressed as Pancham's wife. He is very soft talking in nature, but abuses Pancham when no one is around. He often replies to Sunita's request of taking selfie as "Ha ha, lelo lelo". (2018–2020)
- Raashi Bawa as Sunita Bawa aka Sunnu, Elaichi's sister like best friend and Pintu's love interest. She keeps taking selfies with Elaichi at every moment and calls her Ellu. Her catchphrase is "Ellu selfie!!". (2018–2020)

=== Recurring ===
- Firoz Khan as Chatanki, Karuna's criminal brother. He is often arrested because of his illegal activities. Murari hates Chatanki because of his antics and never spares a chance to roast him. (2018–2020)
- Yogesh Tripathi as Chhote, a local Barber who in a way is the gossip king of the Mohalla. His saloon is named "Mandakini Hair Remover Saloon" as he is a big fan of the actress. However, in between the series, Mandakini's photos on his shop are replaced with hair-styles. Murari constantly visits his saloon for Chhote's massages which are done in really extreme ways, to the point that Chhote sometimes beats Murari in rage. He is the one who indirectly triggers fights and passes on irrelevant information in the mohalla. Whenever Murari is happy, he asks him, "Sethji, bagal ke (baal) bana du?". After some time, he went to Dubai to extend his business and his brother Lotey takes his place. (2018–2019)
- Naveen Bawa as Daroga Pinky Tripathi, who loves domestic work and has a keen interest in cooking, embroidery, knitting etc. He is a lazy Police Inspector and is known to have not been able to solve a single case till date and always says his catchphrases such as "Pinkyji Pooch Rahe Hain" and "Bachpan Se Delhi Mein Reh Ria Hoon".
- Saheb Das Manikpuri as Mangi Lal, an honest constable who works under Pinky. He gets irritated by Pinky's activities and often hurls insults at him in fits of rage. He replies to Pinky's dialogue as "Abey Haaattt!!!". (2018–2020)
- Pallavi Koli as Pushpa, a woman constable who often don't listen to Pinky and has a crush on Mangi Lal.
- Jeetu Gupta as Commissioner of Delhi Police Department who often scolds Pinky and praises Mangi Lal.
- Rajeev Pandey as Lotey, a local barber and brother of Chhote. He came to Chhote's saloon when Chhote went abroad. After sometime, he also went to Dubai and their elder brother Khasote came from Dubai to Delhi. (2019)
- Sumit Arora as Khasote, a local barber and elder brother of Chhote and Lotey. He came to Chhote's saloon from Dubai after Lotey also went to Dubai to Chhote. He always says to Murari "Tum Gooler Khalo".(2019–2020)
- Saurabh Kaushik as Bijendar, a boy who worked at Murari's shop before Pancham but was later fired by Murari when he learned that he had a crush on Elaichi. Now, he works in a marriage band shop which is adjacent to Chhote's saloon. He always asks Murari "Aur...Elaichi Kaisi Hai?" at the saloon.
- Neelesh Malviya as Lalit Uncle, a boy in the mohalla who also has a crush on Elaichi. He always asks to Elaichi not to call him uncle and says "Tu uncle na bola kar, it hurts yaar". He often gets slapped by Pancham due to his silly talks in front of him.
- Deepak Pareek as Sohanpal Bawa, Sunita's father who has a crush on Pintu unknowing that he is a boy. He often asks Pintu to do activities that Sunita's mother used to do to him. He always says to Pintu "Dosti mein No Sorry, No Thank You".
- Ishwar Thakur as Sanju Dixit, whom had a crush on Elaichi, often comes up to Elaichi and yells "ELAICHI" in front of her to which, Elaichi replies "Saanju" in a Phirangi accent. This repeats twice before Elaichi gets irritated and scolds him and he leaves in tears.
- Vijay Kumar Singh as Dixit Ji, Sanju's father and a sweets shop owner in neighbourhood of Murari's shop.
- Rajiv Mehra as various characters
  - including, Netaji Govind Sabbarwal's assistant.
  - Murari's friend, Bansi who lives in Canada.
- Preeti Chaudhary as Sargam, Murari's friend Bansi's daughter who got betrayed in love in Canada and comes to Murari's house in Delhi to see good relationships. She then falls in love with Pancham.
- Khushboo Kamal as Gulabia
- Farida Dadi as Murari's mother and Elaichi's grandmother who gets Elaichi and Pancham get married.
- Upasana Singh as Panchami Khurana (Bebe), Pancham's mother.
- Mithilesh Chaturvedi as various characters
  - including Lalit uncle's grandfather.
  - Elaichi's Science teacher.
- Unknown as Vicky Uncle, a man which is very fond of sleeping in Murari's shop occasionally. Also when Murari sees him, He shoos him away saying to manage his own shop.
- Subhashis Chakraborty as Netaji Govind Sabbarwal, an adaptation of Arvind Kejriwal, a local politician of Chandni Chowk who often doesn't speak and talks by coughing at his assistant.
- Sohit Vijay Soni as various characters.

=== Guests ===
- Krushna Abhishek– for promotion of Marne Bhi Do Yaaron.

== Production ==
Speaking about the show, Sony SAB Sr EVP & Head Neeraj Vyas said, “Keeping up with our vision to provide entertaining comedies and to make India laugh, we begin 2018 with a hilarious new show, Jijaji Chhat Per Hain. This show highlights the various idiosyncrasies of our characters. The dynamic plots of the story and the playful camaraderie between the characters is sure to excite the viewers.”

=== Casting ===
Nikhil Khurana was chosen to play the titular role of Jijaji. Talking about the show he said, “It’s an amazing experience wherein I am exploring a lot of shades that might not have chartered in my earlier projects. The team and the vibe is brilliant. Everyone is playful and the captain of the ship has a vision which is very comforting to know.”

Hiba Nawab was selected to play the role of Elaichi. Talking about the show she said, “This is my second comedy show. Definitely I am excited to be a part of it because I think laughter is the best medicine. This is not something real Hiba is. This time I am trying something I have never done before, this is an overall different character.”

== Sequel ==
A horror spiritual sequel titled Jijaji Chhat Parr Koii Hai starring Hiba Nawab and Shubhashish Jha premiered on Sony SAB on 8 March 2021. It had completely new story without continuing the previous story, only Hiba Nawab, Soma Rathod and Anup Upadhyay, Rashi Bawa, Firoz returned in sequel.

== Awards and nominations ==
Year	Ceremony	Category	Cast	Role	Result	Sources
2018	Indian Television Academy Awards	Best Actor in a Supporting Role	Anup Upadhyay	Murari Bansal	Won	
2019	Indian Telly Awards	Best Actor in comic role	Hiba Nawab	Elaichi	Won	

== See also ==
- List of Hindi comedy shows
