= Shilpa Shinde =

Indian television actress (born 1977)

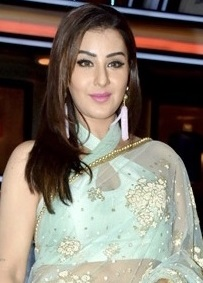
- Shinde in 2018
- Born: 28 August 1977 (age 49); Bombay, Maharashtra, India
- Occupation: Actress
- Years active: 2001–present
- Known for: Bhabhi Ji Ghar Par Hai! Bigg Boss 11
- Political party: Indian National Congress (since 2019)

Shilpa Shinde (born 28 August 1977) is an Indian actress who primarily works in Hindi television and films. She is known for playing Angoori Manmohan Tiwari in &TV's Bhabhi Ji Ghar Par Hai!. and winning Bigg Boss Season 11 in 2017.

== Early life ==
Shinde was born on 28 August 1977 into a Maharashtrian family. Her father, Satyadeo Shinde, was the judge of a High Court while her mother Geeta Satyadeo Shinde is a homemaker. She has two elder sisters and a younger brother. Shinde was a psychology student, but failed to obtain her bachelor's degree. Her father wanted her to study law, but she was not interested in studying the subject.

== Personal life ==
Shinde met actor Romit Raj on the set of TV show Maayka (2007–2009). The two started dating each other soon afterwards. They got engaged in 2009 however both called it off later.

Shinde went into depression when her father died in 2013 of Alzheimer's disease. Her father did not want her to take up acting as a profession. Shinde said, "He never wanted me to get into acting but when I insisted he did give me a year's time and I became an actress. I was there with him day and night in the last couple of months and now he is gone."

== Career ==
Shinde has acted in two Telugu films of 2001: Dasari Narayana Rao's Chinna and Suresh Verma's Shivani.

Shinde made her television debut in 2002 with Amrapali portraying the titular role.

She became popular for her role in the serial Bhabhi. She next starred in the serial Sanjeevani. In 2002 in the same year she played the lead role in Amrapali. Later, she continued to play another role in the show Miss India. In January 2004, Shinde played the parallel lead as Meher in DD National's show Meher – Kahani Haq Aur Haqeeqat Ki. In 2006 she acted in Hari Mirchi Lal Mirchi, and Waaris as Gayatri.

Shinde's breakthrough role was Koyal Narayan in SAB TV's sitcom Chidiya Ghar opposite Paresh Ganatra. Shinde quit the show in 2014 due to problems in her personal life and was replaced by Shubhangi Atre, who played the part for a year.

In 2015, Shinde played the lead role in &TV's Bhabi Ji Ghar Par Hai!. Shinde became a household name with her portrayal of Angoori Bhabhi in Bhabi Ji Ghar Par Hai!, but she quit in March 2016 after having several issues with the makers and accusing them of mentally torturing her. Shinde was replaced by Shubhangi Atre. Atre cited this fact as a mere coincidence.

In 2017, Shinde participated in the reality show Bigg Boss 11. Shinde emerged as the winner in January 2018. In 2018, Times ranked her 7th in the Top 10 Popular Actress in Television. In 2020, she appeared on Gangs of Filmistan and later quit. In December 2020, Shinde portrayed the role of Queen Meerawati in the web series Paurashpur.

In 2022, Shinde participated in Jhalak Dikhhla Jaa 10. She was eliminated in Week 7, finishing at 12th place. In 2024, she participated in Fear Factor: Khatron Ke Khiladi 14 and finished at ninth position on 8 September 2024. Since December 2025, she is playing the role of Angoori Manmohan Tiwari in Bhabi Ji Ghar Par Hain 2.0. In 2026 she also participated as a contestant in reality show Netflix Lock Upp season 2 as a wild-card and finished in 4th place..

== Political career ==
On 5 February 2019, Shinde joined the Indian National Congress ahead of the 2019 Lok Sabha election.

== Controversy ==
In 2017, Shinde accused television producer Sanjay R. Kohli of sexual harassment and filed a police complaint. The allegations arose amid an ongoing dispute over her exit from the television series Bhabiji Ghar Par Hain!. Kohli denied the allegations, and the dispute received significant media coverage. In 2026, she stated during a podcast interview that the complaint had not been genuine and had been made in the context of her contractual dispute with the producers of Bhabiji Ghar Par Hain!.

== Filmography ==
=== Films ===
Year	Title	Role	Language	Notes
2001	Chinna	Mini	Telugu	credited as Akanksha
2001	Shivani		Telugu	
2004	Lek Ladki Ya Gharchi	Madhavi	Marathi	Extended cameo
2017	Patel Ki Punjabi Shaadi	Dancer	Hindi	Special appearance in the song "Maro Line"
2026	Aryabhatt Ka Zero	Simmi	Hindi	

=== Television ===
Year	Title	Role	Notes	Ref.
2002	Amrapali	Amrapali		
2003	Aandhi	Diya		
2003	Tum Bin Jaaoon Kahaan	Diya Rajsingh		
2003–2005	Bhabhi	Manju Chatterjee		
2004	Hatim	Shakila		
2004–2005	Sanjivani	Chitra		
2004–2006	Miss India	Sanjana Gujral		
2005	Raat Hone Ko Hai	Avantika		
2005–2006	Meher	Meher/Naaz		
2006	C.I.D.	Sheetal	Episode: "The Case Of The Mysterious Shadow"	
2007	Hari Mirchi Lal Mirchi	Rinku Khanna		
2008	Waaris	Gayatri Shankar Pratap Singh		
2008–2009	Maayka	Soni Malhotra		
2011–2013; 2014	Chidiya Ghar	Koyal Ghotak Narayan		
2013	Do Dil Ek Jaan	Daya Maayi		
2013	Devon Ke Dev...Mahadev	Mahananda		
2014	Lapataganj	Miss Mary		
2015–2016	Bhabhi Ji Ghar Par Hai!	Angoori Tiwari		
2017–2018	Bigg Boss 11	Contestant	Winner	
2018	Jio Dhan Dhana Dhan	Googly Devi		
2020	Gangs of Filmistan	Herself		
2022	Jhalak Dikhhla Jaa 10	Contestant	12th place	
2023	Maddam Sir	ACP Naina Mathur	Extended cameo appearance	
2024	Fear Factor: Khatron Ke Khiladi 14	Contestant	9th place	
2025–2026	Bhabiji Ghar Par Hai 2.0	Angoori Tiwari		
2025–2026	Bhabiji Ghar Par Hai 2.0	Ghoongat Wali Bhabhiji		
2026	Lock Upp 2 - Sach Ya Sazaa	Contestant	4th place	

=== Web series ===
Year	Title	Role	Notes	Ref.
2020	Paurashpur	Queen Meerawati		
2024	Kadiyaan	Raksha Lokhande		

== See also ==
- List of Hindi television actresses
