= Aasif Sheikh =

Indian actor

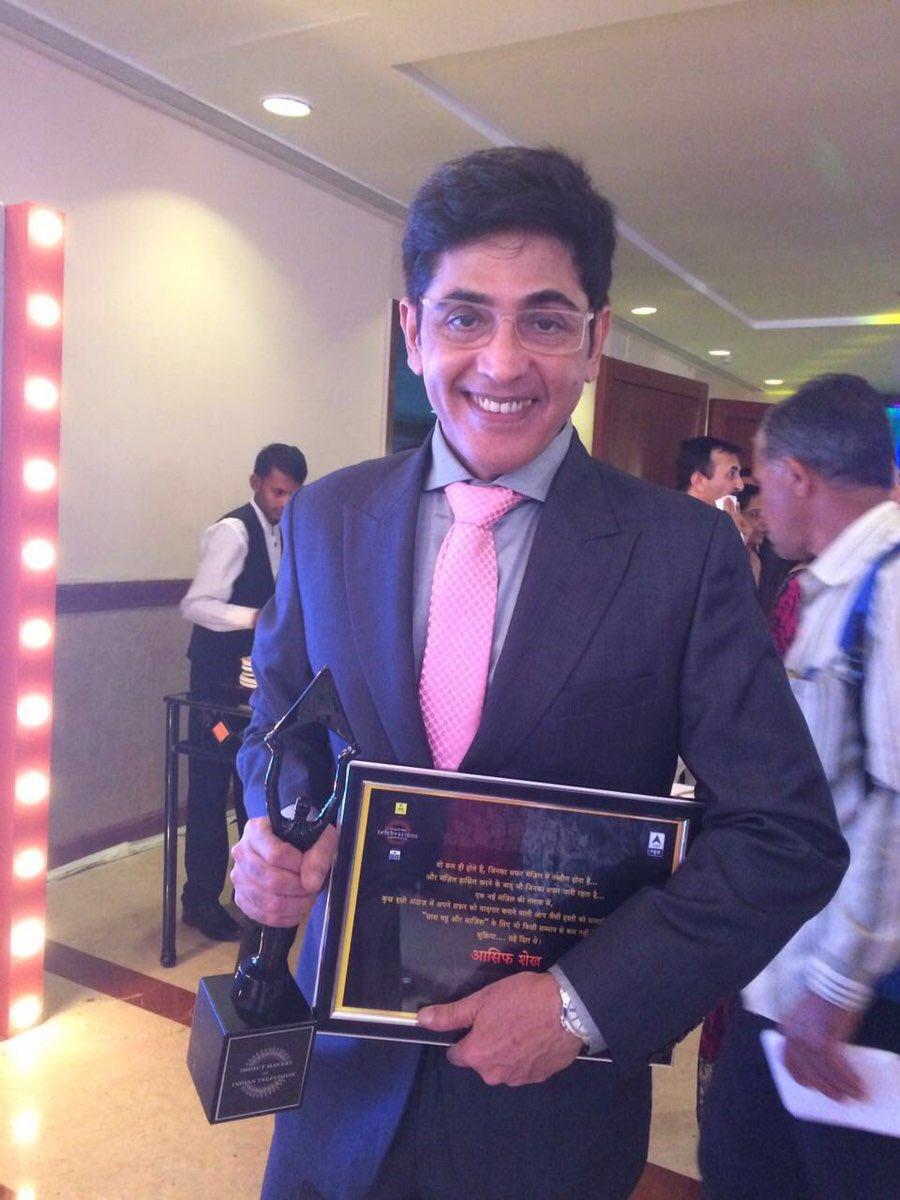
- Sheikh in 2018
- Born: 11 November 1964 (age 61); Delhi, India
- Occupations: Film, stage and television actor
- Years active: 1984 – present
- Known for: Karan Arjun; Yes Boss; Bhabiji Ghar Par Hain!
- Spouse: Zeba Sheikh (m. 1989)
- Children: 2

Aasif Sheikh (born 11 November 1964) is an Indian film, stage, and television actor. He played the role of Prince Ajay Singh in Hum Log, India's first daily soap opera. He has appeared in numerous Bollywood films and TV serials and is well known for his roles in series like Yes Boss, which ran from 1999 to 2009, and the sitcom Bhabiji Ghar Par Hain!, one of the longest running Indian comedy sitcoms.

On 19 October 2021, he was acknowledged by the World Book of Records, London, for performing more than 300 different characters in a single running television show, Bhabiji Ghar Par Hain!.

== Personal life ==
Sheikh was born on 11 November 1964 in New Delhi, India. He attended Saint Anthony's School. He spent his childhood school breaks in Varanasi, Uttar Pradesh. He initially enrolled for a Bachelor of Arts degree in English Honours, then turned in Khalsa College, Delhi to Hotel Management, but soon dropped out to pursue theatre. He is the Alumni of Aligarh Muslim University. He married Zeba Sheikh (Nigar) in 1989, with whom he has two children, daughter, Maryam Nastasia, born 1990, and son, Alyjah Iman, born 1995.

== Theatre ==
Sheikh started his career with theatre in delhi. He is associated with the Indian People's Theatre Association (IPTA) in Mumbai and his plays are Kabuliwala , Aakhri Shama, Simla Coffee House, Hum Deewane Hum Parwane, Ek Baar Phir, Kabuliwala Laut Aaya,Hum Parwaane, Aaall izz Well with Shuturmurgh.

His commercial plays are U turn, Oye Ki Girl Hai, Pyaar mein kabhi kabhi , Kiss Kiss Ko Pyaar Karoon and Tom And Jerry .

== Filmography ==
=== Feature films ===
Year	Film	Role	Notes
1988	Rama O Rama	Vicky (Sonu)	Debut film
1990	Qayamat Ki Raat	Avinash	Lead role
1990	Agneekaal	Aadesh	Lead role
1990	Muqaddar Ka Badshaah	Ashok Singh	
1990	Haque	Sanjay	Lead role
1991	Pyaar Ka Saudagar	Arun Verma	Lead role
1991	Yaara Dildara	Rajesh Mehra	Lead role
1991	Swarg Jaisaa Ghar	Amar	
1991	Lahu Luhaan	Suraj	Lead role
1991	Ek Full Chaar Half		Marathi Film
1992	Naya Sawan		
1992	Sone Ki Zanjeer	Manish	
1992	Apradhi	Chandar	
1993	Khoon Ro Teeko		Rajasthani film
1994	Ishq Mein Jeena Ishq Mein Marna	Inspector Bhure Lal Yadav	
1994	Duniyaa Jhukti Hai	Aakash	Lead role
1995	Zamaana Deewana	Bobby	
1995	Kartavya	Vicky	
1995	Karan Arjun	Suraj Singh	
1995	The Don	Nagesh	
1995	Paandav		
1995	Taaqat	Maniya	
1995	Ham Sab Chor Hain	Rajrani	
1996	Agni Prem		
1996	Army	Rahul	
1996	Muqadma		
1996	Apne Dam Par	Karan Verma	
1996	Bal Bramhachari	Ranjeet	
1996	Chhote Sarkar	Lobo	Special appearance
1997	Mrityudaata	Mohanlal's son	Guest appearance
1997	Banarasi Babu	Vikram	
1997	Auzaar	Inspector Bhutey	
1997	Kaun Sachcha Kaun Jhootha	John D'Souza	
1997	Daadagiri	Monty	
1997	Aur Pyar Ho Gaya	Rohit Malhotra	Guest appearance
1997	Ek Phool Teen Kante	Advocate Dagga	
1997	Dharma Karma		
1998	Miss 420	Arvind	
1998	Pyaar Kiya To Darna Kya	Thakur Vijay Singh's brother	
1998	Zulm-O-Sitam	Man who teased 'Meena'	
1998	Bandhan	Police Inspector	
1998	Pardesi Babu	Nandu	
1998	Sherkhan		
1999	Sikandar Sadak Ka	Bunty Chawla	
1999	Haseena Maan Jaayegi	Preetam	
1999	Pyaar Koi Khel Nahin	Hemant; Kanti's Younger Brother	
1999	Jaalsaaz	Ranjit Rai	
2000	Daak Bangla		
2000	Kunwara	Inder	
2000	Deewane	Vishal's cousin	
2000	Karobaar: The Business of Love	Ramlal's son	
2001	Master	Kailash 'K. C.' Chaudhry	
2001	Hum Deewane Pyar Ke	Tony	
2001	Inteqam	Rocky	
2001	Jodi No. 1	Vikramjit Singh	
2001	Phir Aayegi Woh Raat		
2002	Maine Dil Tujhko Diya	Raman Chopra	
2004	I - Proud To Be An Indian	I's brother	
2004	Aakhri Dastak		
2004	Dil Ne Jise Apna Kaha	R. Tripathi	
2005	Paheli	Ghost	Cameo
2007	Shaadi Karke Phas Gaya Yaar	Bunty	
2007	Nehlle Pe Dehlla	Hansa	
2007	Journey Bombay to Goa: Laughter Unlimited	Dr. Kushal Bhardwaj	
2007	Sajna Ve Sajna	Jibran	
2008	Mehbooba	Shravan's friend	
2008	Tandoori Love	Superstar Ramesh	
2008	Phir Ayegi Woh Raat		
2008	Khabali Fun Unlimited		
2010	Benny and Babloo	Negi	
2010	The Desire: A Journey of a Woman		
2010	Khallballi: Fun Unlimited		
2011	Faraar - On The Run	Wilson D'Souza	
2014	Ekkees Toppon Ki Salaami	Arnab Sharma	
2016	Rare And Dare Six X		
2019	Bharat	Mehek's husband	
2023	Kisi Ka Bhai Kisi Ki Jaan	Doctor	
2026	Bhabiji Ghar Par Hain! Fun On The Run	Vibhuti Narayan Mishra	lead role

=== Television ===
Year	Serial	Role	Notes
1984–1985	Hum Log	Prince Ajay Singh	Debut
1986	Ajoobe		Lead Role
1993	Zee Horror Show	Raj	Segment: Khauff
1994–1996	Chandrakanta	Naagmani Devta	Cameo
1996–1998	Yug	Hasrat Noorani	
1998–1999	Champion		
1999	Tanha	Ali Rehman	Lead role
1999	Adhure Armaan	Sajid	
1999–2009	Yes Boss	Vinod Verma	Lead role
1999	Rishtey - The Love Stories	Sagar Khanna	Episode "Agreement"
1999	Muskaan	Sameer	Lead role
1999–2000	Gul Sanobar	Shehzada Tamaas of Hindustan	Lead role
2001	Samander	Karan	Lead role
2001	Baazaar		
2002	Mehndi Tere Naam Ki	Raj	
2003	Hassi Woh Phassi	Dentist	Lead role
2003	Detective Karan	Jai Arora	
2005–2006	Miilee	Sagar Malhotra	
2005	CID	Varun	Episodes : "The Case of the Mysterious Truck PART I-II″
2005	Siddhant		
2006	Ishq Ki Ghanti		Lead role
2007-2008	Humsafar The Train	Gaurav Verma	Lead role
2009	Dill Mill Gayye	Balvinder 'Billy' Mallik	
2009	CID	Raghav	Episode : "Paheli Laash Ke Tukdon Ki"
2009–2010	Yeh Chanda Kanoon Hai	Vibhuti Narayan	Lead role
2010–2011	Ring Wrong Ring	Vijay Chouhan	Lead role
2011–2012	Don't Worry Chachu	Chintan Desai	Lead role
2012	Chidiya Ghar	Pappi Luthra	
2013	Hum Aapke Hain In Laws	Col. U. R. Sethi	
2014	Tum Saath Ho Jab Apne	Younus Baig	
2015–2026	Bhabi Ji Ghar Par Hai!	Vibhuti Narayan Mishra	Lead role
2017	Door Kinare Milte Hai	Virender	
2022	Yeh Kaali Kaali Ankhein	Himself	Special appearance
2022	Aar Ya Paar	Wasim Bhai	
2026	Family Full House with Rohit Sharma	Guest	Episode 13

== Awards and nominations ==
Year	Award	Category	Show	Result
2002	Indian Telly Awards	TV Actor in a Negative Role	Mehndi Tere Naam Ki	Nominated
2015	Indian Telly Awards	Best Actor in a Comic Role	Bhabi Ji Ghar Par Hai!	Nominated
2016	ITA Awards	Best Actor Comedy Jury	Bhabi Ji Ghar Par Hai!	Won
2017	ITA Awards	Best Actor Comedy Popular	Bhabi Ji Ghar Par Hai!	Won
2017	Nickelodeon Kids' Choice Awards	Best Actor TV	Bhabi Ji Ghar Par Hai!	Nominated
2018	ITA Awards	Best Actor Comedy	Bhabi Ji Ghar Par Hai!	Won
2021	Gold Comedy Awards	Best Actor Male	Bhabi Ji Ghar Par Hai!	Won
2022	ITA Awards	Best Actor Comedy Popular	Bhabi Ji Ghar Par Hai!	Nominated
2024	ITA Awards	Best Actor Comedy Jury)	Bhabi Ji Ghar Par Hai!	Won
2025	Indian Telly Awards	Best Actor	Bhabi Ji Ghar Par Hai!	Won

== See also ==
- List of Indian television actors
- List of Bollywood actors
