= Kiku Sharda =

Indian comedian and actor (born 1976)

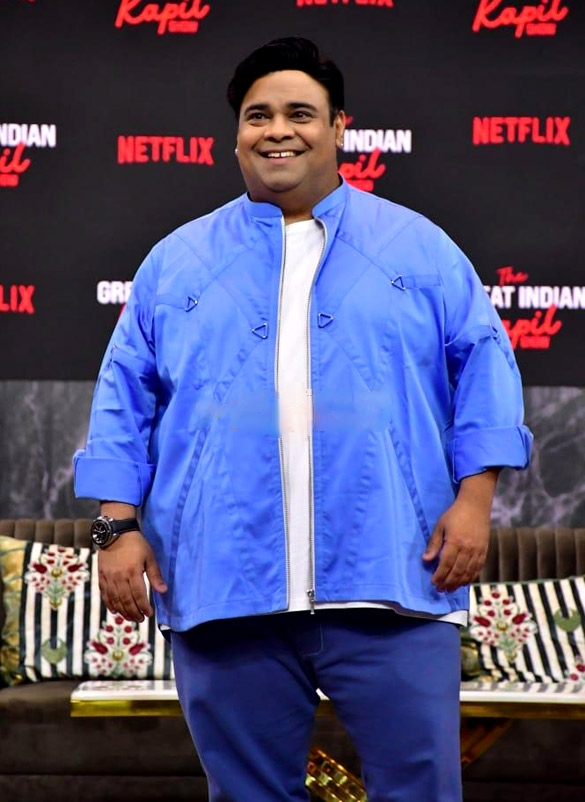
- Sharda in 2024
- Born: Raghavendra Sharda; 14 February 1976 (age 50); Jodhpur, Rajasthan, India
- Occupations: Actor; Comedian
- Years active: 2000–present
- Spouse: Priyanka Sharda (m. 2002)
- Children: 2

Raghavendra Amarnath Sharda (born 14 February 1976), better known as Kiku Sharda, is an Indian comedian and actor who mainly works in Hindi television and Hindi films. He is also known for working in Comedy Nights with Kapil which aired on Colors TV and The Kapil Sharma Show on Sony Entertainment Television, where he played various characters. His other notable characters include Hobo in Hatim, Constable Mulayam Singh Gulgule in F.I.R., and Akbar in the comedy show Akbar Birbal. He participated in Nach Baliye 6 in 2013 and Jhalak Dikhhla Jaa 7 in 2014.

In January 2016, Sharda ran into controversy and was arrested for mimicking Dera Sacha Sauda head Gurmeet Ram Rahim Singh on a television channel in which Kiku dressed as a baba was shown serving liquor and doing lewd dance with girls which insulted the sect chief.

== Early and personal life ==
Raghavendra Amarnath Sharda was born on 14 February 1976 to a Marwari family in Jodhpur, Rajasthan. One of four brothers born to businessman Amarnath Sharda.

He has been married to Priyanka Sharda since 2002, with whom he has two sons.

== Filmography ==
=== Films ===
Key
†	Denotes films that have not yet been released

Year	Title	Role	Notes
2001	Mitti	Qasma	
2003	Darna Mana Hai	Amar	
2006	Phir Hera Pheri	Kanji	
2007	Darling	Doctor	
2007	Dhamaal	Constable	
2007	No Smoking	Doctor	
2007	Go		
2008	Race	Annirudh (Sam)	
2008	Roadside Romeo	Hero English (voice)	
2008	Dasvidaniya		
2008	Love Khichdi	Balwinder	
2010	No Problem		
2014	Happy New Year	Dance teacher	
2016	Mahayoddha Rama	One of Ravan's heads (voice)	
2017	2016 The End	Assi	
2020	Jawaani Jaaneman	Dr. Kriplani	
2020	Angrezi Medium	Gajju	
2022	Thank God	Fatso	
2023	Khichdi 2: Mission Paanthukistan	Robot	Cameo
2025	Loveyapa	Anupam Mehra	
2026	Welcome to the Jungle	Jumbo	
2026	Gajab Raat	Lovely	

=== Television ===
Year	Serial	Role	Notes	Ref.
2003–2004	Hatim	Hobo		
2004–2005	Kabhi Haan Kabhi Naa	Jay		
2004	Aaj Ke Shrimaan Shrimati	Jyoti Prasad		
2005–2007	The Great Indian Comedy Show	Various characters		
2006–2007	Vicky & Vetaal	Fraudster		
2006–2014	F.I.R	Constable Mulayam Singh Gulgule		
2007	Agadam Bagdam Tigdam	Deepak Malhotra		
2007	Kasturi	Kiku		
2008	Bhaago KK Aaya	KK		
2008	Kya Aap Paanchvi Fail Champu Hain?	Faroj Khan		
2009	Bhootwala Serial	Amarnath Bhandari		
2009–2010	Shree Adi Manav	Manav		
2011	Kahani Comedy Circus Ki	Guest contestant		
2011	Ring Wrong Ring	Genie		
2012–2013	Comedy Circus Ke Ajoobe	Contestant		
2013	Nach Baliye 6	Contestant	With wife Priyanka Sharda (5th place)	
2013–2016	Comedy Nights with Kapil	Various characters		
2014–2016	Har Mushkil Ka Hal Akbar Birbal	Akbar		
2014	Jhalak Dikhhla Jaa 7	Himself/Palak (Contestant)	8th place	
2016–2023	The Kapil Sharma Show	Various characters		
2017–2018	Partners Trouble Ho Gayi Double	Manav A Desai		
2018	Family Time With Kapil Sharma	Bumper		
2018	Baby Come Naa	Yoyo Bappi Singh	Web series	
2019	Booo Sabki Phategi	Puchki	Web series	
2019	Dr Pran Lele	Dr. Pran		
2024–present	The Great Indian Kapil Show	Various characters		
2025	Rise and Fall	Contestant	10th place	
2026	India's Got Latent	Guest judge	Season 2, Episode 2	

== Awards ==
Year	Award	Category	Serial	Outcome
2015	Indian Telly Awards	Best Actor in a Supporting Role (Comedy)	Akbar Birbal	Won
2019	Indian Television Academy Awards	Best Actor in a Comic Role	The Kapil Sharma Show	Won
2025	Indian Television Academy Awards	Best Supporting Actor OTT (Comedy series)	The Great Indian Kapil Show	Won
