= Bhabiji Ghar Par Hain! =

2015 Indian Hindi language sitcom

- Promotional poster
- Genre: Sitcom
- Written by: Manoj Santoshi; Raghuvir Shekhawat
- Screenplay by: Shashank Bali; Sanjay Kohli
- Story by: Manoj Santoshi
- Directed by: Shashank Bali; Rajan Waghdhare
- Creative director: Harshada Pranav Pathak (Potnis)
- Starring: Aasif Sheikh; Rohitashv Gour; Shilpa Shinde; Saumya Tandon; Shubhangi Atre; Neha Pendse; Vidisha Srivastava
- Opening theme: Bhabi Ji Ghar Par Hain!
- Country of origin: India
- Original language: Hindi
- No. of seasons: 2
- No. of episodes: 2,834

Production
- Producers: Binaifer S Kohli; Sanjay R Kohli
- Cinematography: Raja Satankar
- Editors: Rahul H Solanki; Pravesh J Shetty
- Camera setup: Multi-camera
- Running time: 22 minutes
- Production company: Edit II Productions

Original release
- Network: &TV; Zee5
- Release: 2 March 2015 – 17 April 2026

Related
- Happu Ki Ultan Paltan (2019 - 2026); Bhabiji Ghar Par Hain! Fun on the Run (2026)

Bhabiji Ghar Par Hain! (transl. Is Sister-in-Law at Home?), sometimes abbreviated as BGPH, is an Indian Hindi-language sitcom that premiered on 2 March 2015 on &TV and is digitally available on ZEE5. The series is produced under the banner of Edit II Productions.

This comedy show revolves around two neighbouring couples, the Mishras and the Tiwaris, where the husbands are attracted to each other's wives and use various, ultimately unsuccessful, yet hilarious techniques to impress them.

The show has garnered widespread acclaim from critics and viewers. Bhabiji Ghar Par Hain! is inspired by the 1990s Hindi sitcom Shrimaan Shrimati. A spin-off sitcom, Happu Ki Ultan Paltan, featuring the show's character Happu Singh, was also released in 2019. The show also got a second season titled Bhabiji Ghar Par Hain! 2.0 which was a revamped supernatural-comedy version of the show, which premiered on 25 December 2025 on &TV and ZEE5. It featured the return of Shilpa Shinde as the original Angoori Bhabi. The show also got a cinematic spin off movie titled Bhabiji Ghar Par Hain! Fun On The Run which got released in theatres on 6 February 2026 and is now digitally available on ZEE5.

== Series overview ==
Series	Episodes	Originally released	
Series	Episodes	First released	Last released
1	2,749	2 March 2015	19 December 2025
2	85	22 December 2025	17 April 2026

== Plot ==
The show is set in the fictional "Modern Colony" in Kanpur and revolves around two neighbouring couples. The husbands, Vibhuti Narayan Mishra and Manmohan Tiwari, have been married for seven years and are dissatisfied with their marriages, while being smitten with each other's wives, unbeknownst to one another.

Manmohan Tiwari is a successful undergarment businessman. Often referred to as "Kaccha Baniyaan" (a slang term for someone who sells undergarments), he spends most of his time managing his business. In contrast, his wife, Angoori Tiwari, is a simple and naïve housewife.

Their neighbour, Vibhuti Narayan Mishra, was once an unsuccessful insurance agent and is now unemployed. Often referred to as "Nalla" (a slang term for being unemployed), he spends most of his time doing household chores. In contrast, his wife, Anita Mishra, is a headstrong, intelligent, and modern woman who runs grooming classes. She is the breadwinner of the family and disapproves of her husband's unemployment and laziness.

Their houses are located opposite each other, with the Tiwaris residing in House No. 6 and the Mishras in House No. 9. The Tiwaris own their house, while the Mishras live in a rented property that belonged to Anita's uncle. Much of the plot unfolds in their respective homes, and the characters often visit a nearby tea stall, "Gupta Tea Center", where they discuss their lives and daily affairs.

As both men devise schemes to impress each other's wives—Angoori and Anita—they frequently undermine one another and create further complications for everyone involved.

== Cast ==
=== Main ===
- Aasif Sheikh as Vibhuti "Vibhu" Narayan Mishra, an unsuccessful insurance agent, Anita's husband, David's nephew, and Helen's son. Often called "Nalla" for being unemployed, he has fallen for the simple-minded Angoori Tiwari, Manmohan’s wife. He is known to be highly educated but refuses to take a regular job due to his pride and an aversion to conventional employment. His plans to woo Angoori usually fail due to her naivety, putting him in dire situations. He despises Manmohan Tiwari, believing that Manmohan doesn't deserve a wife like Angoori. Vibhuti has tried numerous times to ruin Manmohan's reputation in front of Angoori, but these attempts have led to negative results. Although he claims to be the "Chhapra University Topper," his Uncle David Mishra revealed that he bought the degree for him during his college years. (2015–2026)
- Rohitashv Gour as Manmohan Tiwari, a successful undergarments businessman. Often called ‘Kaccha-Baniyaan’ for selling undergarments, he is attracted to the modern and elegant Anita Mishra, Vibhuti's wife. He is Ramkali's elder son, Laddu's elder brother, and Angoori's husband. He’s often depicted being short tempered and greedy, as he keeps all money to himself and refuses to give it to others. Throughout the series, it is frequently hinted, though never confirmed, that Manmohan may not be Ramkali's biological son from her husband Jummanlal Tiwari but rather from Pandit Ramphal, a priest from whom Ramkali regularly seeks remedies and spiritual advice. (2015–2026)
- Shilpa Shinde as Angoori Tiwari. Shinde left the series after a dispute with the series' producer, Binaifer Kohli and former channel head Vikas Gupta. Later in December 2025, she returned, reprising her role as Angoori Tiwari. (2015–2016, 2025-2026)
  - Ghunghat Wali Bhabhiji (2025–2026)
- Shubhangi Atre as Angoori Tiwari (2016–2025) Angoori Tiwari, a traditional Indian housewife who wears a lehenga-style saree, sindoor and mangalasutra and speaks with a Bhojpuri accent. She is gullible, kind-hearted, and innocent, regarded as one of the most kindhearted women in her neighbourhood. She is Manmohan's wife, Bhoorey Lal's daughter, and Puttan's elder sister. Angoori performs various superstitious rituals, often suggested by her loving mother-in-law, Ramkali, leading to humorous outcomes. She occasionally mispronounces English words, prompting others to correct her in certain situations, to which she replies with her signature catchphrase "Sahi Pakde Hai!" (You Got It Right!).
- Saumya Tandon as Anita "Annu" Mishra, Vibhuti's wife, a modern, elegant woman who leads grooming classes in Kanpur. She holds a black belt in Karate, which she uses for self-defense. She despises her husband's laziness and often makes him do the household chores, to fulfill her romantic fantasies, she frequently persuades Vibhuti to adopt various characters, such as a thief, robber, college stud, painter, dacoit, electrician, and cop, often leaving him frustrated. She shares a good friendship with Angoori. On 21 August 2020, Tandon revealed via her social media accounts that she has opted to not renew her contract and has quit the show. (2015–2020)
  - Neha Pendse replaced Tandon in February 2021. Pendse quit the show a year later, in February 2022. (2021–2022)
  - Vidisha Srivastava replaced Pendse in 2022. (2022–2026)

=== Recurring ===
- Saanand Verma as Anokhelal Saxena, commonly known as Saxena Ji. He is eccentric and mentally unstable. He often electrocutes himself and consumes bizarre or unhealthy items like lizard soup and cockroach tea, followed by his trademark exclamation, "I like it!". Saxena is depicted with various occupations, including lawyer, artist, actor, writer, tailor and singer. (2015-2026)
- Yogesh Tripathi as Daroga Happu Singh, a corrupt police inspector who has a secret crush on Gulfam Kali and Anita, whom he affectionately calls 'Gori Mem' (meaning "Fair Ma'am"). He frequently demands bribes and occasionally thrashes Tillu, Tika, and Malkhan for their mischief. (2015-2025)
- Jeetu Gupta as Dr. Gupta, a doctor who is often referred to as a "sage" because he frequently resorts to black magic to treat his patients, as his medical prescriptions almost never work. (2015-2026)
- Syed Salim Zaidi as Tillu, Manmohan's shop employee who constantly schemes against him to obtain his unpaid salary. To extort his wages, he has robbed Manmohan's house, made threatening calls, and even kidnapped Manmohan's younger brother, but he always fails in his attempts. (2015-2026)
- Soma Rathod as Ramkali Tiwari (Ammaji), Jummanlal's wife, Manmohan and Ladoos's mother who loves her daughter-in law, Angoori and younger son, Ladoo. Ramkali is a devoted follower of the renowned astrologer and priest, Pundit Ramphal, who suggests various rituals that she makes Angoori perform to attain health and wealth. The nature of Ramkali's relationship with Pundit Ramphal insinuates that he may be Manmohan Tiwari's biological father. (2015-2026)
- Vaibhav Mathur as Tika Ram, an unemployed dimwit who often accompanies his friends Tillu and Malkhan. The trio lives together in a rented place. Tika frequently flirts with girls alongside Malkhan. At times, he is depicted as a diploma holder, while at other times he is shown as illiterate. One of Tika's amusing quirks is his miscommunication; he often says, "I can't toilet," when he actually means, "I can't tolerate. (2015-2026)
- Deepesh Bhan as Malkhan Singh. He and his two friends engage in money-making schemes involving chit funds, kidnapping, selling stolen items, and drinking alcohol, but they are frequently caught and jailed. Malkhan often flirts with girls alongside Tika and Tillu. Bhan died on 23 July 2022. (2015–2022)
  - Vipin Heero replaced Bhan as Malkhan (2025–2026)
- Vishwajeet Soni as Prem Chaudhary, Vibhuti's best friend who is a rich, foul-mouthed cunning show-off and an impersonator of Indian film actor Prem Chopra. He often gambles and smuggles. (2015-2026)
- Akshay Patil as
  - Pelu Chaurasia, the colony's mute rickshaw puller. He communicates by pulling out message slips out of his muffler tied around his head and smiles. He is known for his intelligence. He carries a portable radio, providing songs appropriate to often hilarious situations.He also has played various roles in this show. In the plane hijacking episode, it was revealed that he was a pilot for six years.(2015–2025)
  - Peli (2025–2026)
- Anup Upadhyay as David Mishra: Vibhuti's UK-based dubiously rich uncle who visits him in awkward situations. Whenever he visits Vibhuti, he brings papers to his ₹20 crore property, so he can name Vibhuti his heir. But, due to one reason or another, he and sometimes others, too, shred the papers, but this has been phased out in later episodes. (2016-2026)
- Sandeep Yadav as Sabzi Wala (2015–2017)
- Kishore Bhanushali as Resham Pal Singh, the no-nonsense Commissioner of Kanpur Police Department. He is honest and dislikes Happu Singh's corrupt antics. Actor Kishore Bhanushali has been a lifelong impersonator of the late Indian film actor Dev Anand and he brings his characteristics to this role. He has also appeared as another character 'Sharma Uncle' in a horror episode (EP-341) previously before taking on this character later. (2016-2025)
- Rakesh Bedi as Bhoorey Lal, Angoori's alcoholic but loving father. He hates Manmohan for marrying her by lying about his business profession. (2015-2025)
- Vijay Kumar Singh as Master Bhoop Singh. He is a Masterji (teacher) in Ladoo's school. Bhoop Singh is a believer of strict Indian moral values or "Sanskar" as he calls them. In the show, he is the caricature of old-fashioned teachers from rural India. He wears khadi jacket, carries an Indian-style side-bag called "Jhola" and always has a long and thin bamboo stick called "Santi" to beat those who misbehave. When he witnesses improper behaviour in public, he recites his catchphrase, Sanskar naam ka cheez hai ki nahi? (Do you have any moral values or not?). (2015-2026)
- Falguni Rajani as Gulfam Kali, an infamous tawaif (courtesan) of Kanpur. She knows the male characters' secrets and uses these to manipulate them. Rajani quit the show in September 2020. (2015–2019)
- Khushboo Kamal as
  - Badami, Gulfam Kali's younger sister(2018–2019)
  - Pammi Leoni (2015)
  - Episodic role; various characters (2015–2025)
  - Jagrati Singh Parihar plays various characters mostly with Tika, Malkhan and Tillu (2015)
- Shekhar Shukla as Panditji: A disciple of pundit Ramphal (2015)
  - Saurabh Kaushik replaced Shukla in the role (2016–2018)
- Hardik Gohil as Laddoo Tiwari, who is the younger brother of Manmohan Tiwari and Ramkali's younger son. He has a subtle-telepathic ability and perceives others' thoughts. (2015–2019)
- Firoz Khan as Chhedi, a flirting Dhobi (washerman) of the locality. He quit the show in 2021. Khan died on 23 May 2024. (2015–2021)
- Rajeev Mehra as various characters including a Minister of Uttar Pradesh and also as Makkhmal Makwana, the new police commissioner who had temporarily replaced Resham Pal Singh but was demoted for corruption.
- Nitin Jadhav as Constable Manohar. (2019–2025)
- Manoj Santoshi (writer of Bhabiji Ghar Par Hain!) has appeared as various characters. Santoshi died on 23 March 2025.
- Sandeep Anand as Puttan: Angoori's brother who is a thief.(2015–2019)
- Manju Brijnandan Sharma (2015–2016) as Helen Ahuti Narayan Mishra, Vibhuti's mother
  - Pratima Kazmi as Helen Ahuti Narayan (2020–2021):
- Akshita Sethi (2018-2023) / Khushi Solanki (2025) as Meenal: Anurag's wife, Anita's best friend, Vibhuti's college friend
- Ishwar Thakur as Anurag: Minal's husband, Anita, Vibhuti's friend (2018–2021; 2025-2026)
- Anang Desai as Danny Sharma: Anita's NRI father who disapproves Vibhuti because of their love marriage (2021)
- Praful Chauhan as Yaad Ram's son (2015-2026)
- Anup Kumar Singh as various characters
- Naveen Bawa as various characters (2015–2025)
- Saheb Das ManikPuri as various characters (2015–2024)
- Pallavi Kohli as Various Characters (2015–2026)
- Sohit Vijay Soni as News Anchor and other characters.
- Anu Awasthi as Anu Awasthi (Anu Mama) Ramkali's brother, Manmohan Tiwari's uncle
- KK Goswami as various characters
- Liliput as Maamulal Chaurasiya, Vibhuti's Mamaji (mother's brother) who suffers from haemorrhoids and is led to believe that Vibhuti is a doctor. (2016)
- Mithilesh Chaturvedi as various characters (2016–2019). He died on 3 August 2022.
- Navin Prabhakar as the mentally unstable Kavi (poet) Pramod Pralay Jhangirabadi who has been in love with Anita since college days. He again appeared briefly as a short-tempered musician Jaleel Chaudhary.
- Pranay Dixit as various characters
- Rajiv Kumar Tiwari as Pandit Ramphal (2019-2025)
- Charul Malik as Misti Mukherjee (2018) / Rusa (2021–2024): The commissioner's sister-in-law. She reprises her role from Happu Ki Ultan Paltan!
- Sumit Arora as various characters (2021–2025)

=== Guests ===
Several celebrities and actors have appeared on the show as guest stars, either to promote their films or for special appearances.

- Ravi Kishan as himself
- Shakti Kapoor as himself
- Ranjeet as himself
- Kumar Sanu as himself
- Alka Yagnik as herself
- Govinda as himself
- Ranveer Singh promoted Bajirao Mastani
- Arjun Kapoor promoted Ki & Ka
- Ritesh Deshmukh, Vivek Oberoi and Urvashi Rautela promoted Great Grand Masti
- Brett Lee promoted UnIndian.
- Sunny Leone appeared as herself in Bhabi ji Ghar Par Hai!: Sunny Leone Special
- Shaan promoted The Voice India (Season 2).
- Akshay Kumar promoted Jolly LLB 2, Toilet: Ek Prem Katha and Gold
- Varun Dhawan and Alia Bhatt promoted Badrinath Ki Dulhania
- Anushka Sharma promoted Phillauri
- Ayushmann Khurrana and Kriti Sanon promoted Bareilly Ki Barfi
- Varun Dhawan promoted Judwaa 2
- Nitin Goswami promoted Siddhi Vinayak
- Lara Dutta and Ahmed Khan promoted the reality dance show High Fever - Dance Ka Naya Tevar
- Krushna Abhishek and Nazia Hussain promoted Teri Bhabhi Hai Pagle
- Salman Khan and Katrina Kaif promoted Bharat
- Karan Kundrra as Rahul

== Background and production ==
=== Development and writing ===
After the launch of &pictures in November 2014, ZEE network launched its second channel under the "&" network brand, "&tv", to be launched in March 2015. The channel's original content line-up was announced in early 2015 with "Bhabiji..." included, announced as a light-hearted comedy sitcom. All promos were featured on ZEE. The channel intended to place "Bhabiji..." in a late-night slot as a comedy show for adults.

=== Casting ===
Before the show went into production, Rashmi Desai was chosen to play the character of 'Angoori'. But Desai rejected the role because of age differences between her and co-actor Rohitash Gaud and the role went to Shilpa Shinde. Actor Aasif Sheikh revealed that before production started, he suggested the makers to cast Shilpa Shinde, when he heard about the character of 'Angoori' for the first time.

After one year in April 2016, approximately 80 actresses auditioned for the role of Angoori and Shubhangi Atre was selected after the unexpected exit of Shinde from the series.

=== Filming ===
The set of Bhabiji Ghar Par Hain! is located in Naigaon.

In October 2016, film actress Sunny Leone came in for a sequence shoot on the set of Bhabiji Ghar Par Hai!. While on set, she refused to say Angoori's catchphrase "Sahi Pakde Hain" ("You got it right!") as she thought it has a vulgar meaning. It took approximately one hour for the makers to convince her that Angoori says this line in literal context and that it has no vulgar meaning and the shoot was resumed.

=== Music ===
The "BhabiJi Rap Song" was sung, composed and written by Anmol Malik and Raftaar. The soundtrack for the serial was released on 25 February 2017 by Zee Music Company.

== Specials ==
In November 2016, the show was extended by one more day, named "Bhabiji Ghar Par Hai Shanivaar Special" in which celebrities visit the sets. Nine Shanivaar Special episodes were aired on Saturdays, with celebrity guest stars appearing as part of a plot woven around them and were subsequently interviewed by the main cast. A 'Sunday Horror Special' was aired in June 2016.

- Episode 1: Govinda
- Episode 2: Karan Singh Grover and Bipasha Basu
- Episode 3: Ranjeet and Shakti Kapoor
- Episode 4: Kumar Sanu and Alka Yagnik
- Episode 5: Ravi Kishen
- Episode 6: Jimmy Shergill
- Episodes 7 & 8: Jackie Shroff
- Episode 9: New Year Special, featuring actors from various TV shows of &TV
- Episode 10: 1 Hour Horror Special, Ep 341 on 19 June 2016

Sunday Specials

- 19 March 2017 - Episode 1 Tiwari Becomes Tree
- 26 March 2017 - Episode 2 April Fool Special

== Other media ==
=== Spin-off ===
In 2017, it was reported the show will be adapted for British and Anglo-Spanish audiences, produced by ZEE Studios under the title Love Thy Neighbor. A spin-off titled Happu Ki Ultan Paltan, based upon the character of Daroga Happu Singh, had been green-lighted by And TV in late 2018. The spin-off revolves around Happu's domestic life not seen in "Bhabiji Ghar Par Hain!". The show premiered on 4 March 2019.

=== Film adaptation ===
A film based on the series called Bhabiji Ghar Par Hain! Fun On The Run was released on 6 February 2026. It is be directed by the director of the television series, Shashank Bali. It is produced by Sanjay Kohli, Binaifer Kohli and Vihaan Kohli.

== Reception ==
=== Critical reception ===
In 2015, TVR ratings confirmed that Bhabiji Ghar Par Hai! had higher viewership than the popular reality show Bigg Boss, which had the same time-slot and was hosted by actor Salman Khan. Bhabiji Ghar Par Hai! is one of the most-watched sitcoms in Pakistan.

In a 2016 interview, the show's director Shashank Bali acknowledged that when Shilpa Shinde left the show and Shubhangi Atre was roped in for the role of 'Angoori', the show's ratings declined. He said, "Viewers were so involved with the original cast. When Shilpa got replaced, the connection broke with the viewers; hence we dropped in numbers. Now we have again recovered the original rating".

In 2017, the show's publicity was questioned when co-actress, Shilpa Shinde participated in Bigg Boss. In an interview, a reporter asked actor Aasif Sheikh whether Shilpa Shinde's participation in Bigg Boss 11 publicised the show, to which Aasif Sheikh replied, "Our show is doing good, which is what matters. Publicity is publicity whether it is good or bad".

According to DNA, Bhabiji Ghar Par Hai! is a top-ranking sitcom on local primetime television. In 2018, union minister Kiren Rijiju in his tweet, stated he and his wife are enthusiastic followers of Bhabhiji Ghar Par Hai!

Catchphrases used by the characters, particularly Angoori's "Sahi Pakde Hain", Vibhuti's "I am sa-a-ah-ree (a humorously exaggerated take on "sorry")...I'm really, really sah-ree", that of Saxena Ji's "I like it", Happu Singh's "Arre Dada" and Masterji's "Sanskar naam ka cheez hai ki nahi" have become popular outside the show.

Aasif Sheikh who plays the role of Vibhuti Narayan Mishra in the show has been acknowledged by World Book of Records London for Performing More than 300 Different Characters in a single running Television show on 19 October 2021.

In a 2023 interview, actor Aasif Sheikh also revealed that when Bhabi Ji Ghar Par Hain debuted, nobody was confident about it and thought it would not run beyond six months. He said, “We had never imagined that Bhabi Ji would run for 8 years and would complete 2000 episodes.

The show, while having a more adult premise than most other Indian TV shows, tried to defy the gender expectations of a female character on the show, according to the female lead Saumya Tandon. While explaining the norms of Indian television industry, she said:

I play 'Gori Mem' Anita Bhabhi's character. I feel she one-of-a-kind Bhabhi on Indian TV. When all the heroines of Indian TV are poor innocent women crying for help all the time, battered by husbands and in-laws, Anita is wacky, bold, romantic, strong and independent. She breaks all norms of a stereotypical Bhabhi or a TV heroine. In such a male-dominated society if she has managed to steal peoples hearts, that shows our society is not all that regressive. She has shown the world that heroines can get TRPs even laughing and not just by crying.

In August 2018, Shubhangi Atre said audiences want a wife like her character Angoori.

== Awards and nominations ==
Indian Telly Awards

Year	Nominee / work	Award	Result
2015	Shilpa Shinde	Best Actress in a Comic Role	Won
2015	Saumya Tandon	Best Actress in a Comic Role	Nominated
2015	Rohitash Gaud	Best Actor in a Comic Role	Won
2015	Aashif Sheikh	Best Actor in a Comic Role	Nominated
2015	Shashank Bali	Best Director (Sitcom)	Won
2015	Manoj Santoshi	Best Dialogue Writer (Sitcom or Comedy)	Won
2015	Raghuvir Shekhawat	Best Screenplay Writer (Sitcom/Comedy)	Won

Indian Television Academy Awards

Year	Nominee / work	Award	Result
2016	Shubhangi Atre	Best Actress – Comedy	Won
2016	Saumya Tandon	Best Actress – Comedy	Nominated
2016	Aashif Sheikh	Best Actor – Comedy	Won
2016	Rohitash Gaud	Best Actor – Comedy	Nominated
2016	Shashank Bali	Best Director – Comedy (Jury)	Won
2016	Manoj Santoshi	Best Dialogues (Jury)	Won

== Controversies ==
In March 2016, actress Shilpa Shinde unexpectedly left the show. Shinde made several allegations against producers Benaifer Kohli, Sanjay Kohli, co-actress Saumya Tandon, and &TV programming head Vikas Gupta. Shinde stated that she was forced to leave the show and was owed ₹32 lakh (3.2 million rupees). Benaifer Kohli responded in September 2016 that Shinde's salary had twice been raised in the past as per her demand.

The matter was taken to Cine and TV Artists Association (CINTAA) and soon after that, Edit II Productions dispatched a legal document to Shinde for her unexplained absence from the production, which continued.

Shinde mentioned that the makers favoured Tandon over her, citing lack of personal staff for her. Benaifer Kohli denied the discrimination claim and said that she never refused any demand from Shinde regarding her costumes, jewellery or make-up. Tandon stated: "At the beginning of the show when I signed the contract, I had made it clear to the producers that I will manage my own designer and make-up".

On 3 March 2016, Sanjay Kohli announced that the show would replace Shinde, whom he accused of unprofessional behaviour. Shinde stated &TV falsely accused her of unprofessionalism because she refused to sign a new contract with a clause that she not portray a character like Angoori in the future. Binaifer Kohli demanded approximately ₹12 crore (120 million rupees) from Shinde, citing breach of contract as Shinde was trying to work on another show. Shinde said there was no such clause and accused Kohli of contract-tempering.

In March 2017, Shinde filed a First Information Report (FIR) against Sanjay Kohli, whom she accused of sexual harassment, an allegation she later admitted was false. According to the FIR:

Shilpa has alleged that Sanjay often tried to take advantage of her and called her hot and sexy. She said that he even touched her inappropriately once to which she objected with a firm no. Sanjay threatened her that he will throw her out of the show if she spoke to anyone about this. Next day, he again came to her make-up room and told her to get into a physical relationship with him if she wanted to stay on the show. She alleged that her make-up man saw this happening, after which he was fired.

Shinde also stated that she talked about the matter to her co-actress Saumya Tandon. Shinde further said that after listening to the matter, Tandon's reply was: "No one rapes in our industry, Shilpa". Shinde stated that Benaifer Kohli tried to bury the matter and threatened her. Tandon responded to Shinde's statement:

It is so sad that she used my name. Saying that she confided in me is not true at all. I shared a very professional relationship with her. [...] I didn't get any such vibes from my producer [Sanjay Kohli] and I never noticed him having such kind of intention for any other female on our sets. In fact, he doesn't really come on the sets and he never goes to any actor's room or vanity at all, so I didn't experience any such thing.

In April 2017, actress Sameeksha Singh, who worked with producers Binaifer Kohli and Sanjay Kohli in their serial Zaara, stated that she was in the same situation when she was working with them. She said Sanjay Kohli used to flirt with her but his actions were unacceptable in Shinde's situation. Television actress Kavita Kaushik who worked with Sanjay Kohli on his show FIR, questioned why Shinde was quiet for one year and accused her of being a bad example for other girls. Shinde replied that she was facing many problems at that time and that it is difficult to publicly address sexual harassment.

In April 2017, Benaifer Kohli and Sanjay Kohli registered a case against Shinde for defamation. On 13 February 2018, Shinde stated the show's makers had approached her and requested her to finish the matter and she had retracted her FIR against Sanjay Kohli.

Years later, during a podcast, Shinde publicly admitted that the sexual harassment allegations against Sanjay Kohli were entirely false. She clarified that she filed the fabricated complaint because she felt trapped by her contract and the ongoing professional dispute with the show's makers, believing it was her only leverage. The overarching conflict was eventually resolved through a private settlement where her pending dues were cleared. Shinde noted that she now maintains a cordial relationship with the producers, which eventually led to her returning to the Bhabiji Ghar Par Hai! franchise.

== Adaptations ==
Language	Title	Original release	Network(s)	Last aired	Notes
Tamil	Darling Darling டார்லிங் டார்லிங்	12 December 2016	Zee Tamil	10 June 2017	Remake
Marathi	Hum To Tere Aashiq Hai हम तो तेरे आशिक है	8 November 2017	Zee Marathi	12 September 2018	Remake

== See also ==
- List of Hindi comedy shows
