= Rohitashv Gour =

Indian film and television actor (born 1966)

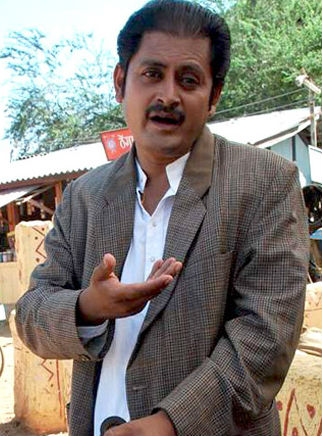
- Born: 24 March 1966 (age 60); Himachal Pradesh, India
- Education: National School of Drama
- Occupations: Film and television actor
- Years active: 1989–present
- Known for: Lapataganj; Bhabi Ji Ghar Par Hai!
- Spouse: Rekha Gour (m. 2002)
- Children: 2

Rohitashv Gour is an Indian actor who appears in Hindi films and television shows. He is best known for his leading roles in the TV sitcoms Lapataganj and Bhabiji Ghar Par Hain!. The latter ranks among the longest-running Indian sitcoms.

== Early and personal life ==
Gour is from Himachal Pradesh and was a student of the National School of Drama (NSD), New Delhi.

In 1986, he was selected for the National School of Drama, one of India’s prominent institutions for theatre and acting, and graduated in 1989. After completing his studies, he contributed to the promotion of theatre culture in Himachal Pradesh by conducting acting workshops and supporting amateur theatre through annual dance-drama festivals in Shimla.

Rohitash was associated with the National School of Drama Repertory Company for six years, where he worked with theatre practitioners including Ebrahim Alkazi, M. K. Raina, Ranjit Kapoor, Anuradha Kapur, Kirti Jain, Bhanu Bharti, Ram Gopal Bajaj, and Barry John. He also attended a short-term film appreciation course at the Film and Television Institute of India (FTII), Pune.

As president of the All India Artists Association in Shimla, Gour has been associated with efforts to support the amateur theatre movement and provide a platform for emerging performers.

He resides in Mumbai with his wife, Dr. Rekha Gour, and they have two daughters, Giti Gour and Sanjiti Gour.

== Career ==
Rohitashv Gour made his Bollywood debut in the 2001 biographical film Veer Savarkar. Although he has acted in 11 Bollywood films so far, most of them are very minor roles like police inspector role in college drama of Kya Kehna etc. He portrayed the role of Mukundilal Gupta, in the SAB TV sitcom Lapataganj – Sharad Joshi Ki Kahaniyon Ka Pata. He is currently working in &TVs comedy show Bhabi Ji Ghar Par Hai! as Manmohan Tiwari, an undergarments business man. He also acted in a 1990s television serial named Ehsaas. His second film was 2002 Irrfan Khan starrer Pratha. He then acted in 2003 film Pinjar, where he played the role of protagonist's (Manoj Bajpai) brother. The same year, he acted in two more movies, Dhoop directed by the National Award winning director Ashwini Chaudhary and in Munna Bhai M.B.B.S. where he played the role of nariyal pani waala (coconut water vendor). After a one-year gap, he starred in 2005 film Matrubhoomi – A Nation Without Women. The same year, he starred in Sun Zarra, Lage Raho Munna Bhai, the sequel to the 2003 film Munna Bhai M.B.B.S., wherein he portrayed the role of Cuckoo, the antagonist Lucky Singh's (Boman Irani) secretary and in Dil Se Pooch? Kidhar Jaana Hai. Again after a gap of a year, in 2008, he was seen in the comedy film One Two Three (uncredited remake of Blame it on the Bellboy) and the much critically acclaimed A Wednesday!, where he portrayed the role of Ikhlaque Ahmed, a fictional terrorist. In 2010 he acted in the film Atithi Tum Kab Jaoge?, where he portrayed the role of a bank manager. His latest release was PK in 2014 where he played as a police constable named Pandey Ji.

== Filmography ==
=== Films ===
Year	Title	Role	Notes
2000	Kya Kehna	College Student participating in Drama	
2001	Veer Savarkar	Ganesh Damodar Savarkar	
2002	Pratha	S.P. Ashish	
2003	Matrubhoomi	Pratab	
2003	Pinjar	Rashid's Brother	
2003	Haasil		
2003	Dhoop		
2003	Munnabhai M.B.B.S.	Coconut Seller in Park	
2006	Lage Raho Munna Bhai	Cuckoo	
2006	Dil Se Pooch... Kidhar Jaana Hai		
2008	A Wednesday	Ikhlaque Ahmed	
2008	One Two Three	Collection agent	
2010	Atithi Tum Kab Jaoge?	Niranjan Tripathi	
2014	PK	Police Inspector Pandey	
2023	Dunki	Visa Agent	
2025	Sunny Sanskari Ki Tulsi Kumari	Suresh Sanskari	
2026	Bhabiji Ghar Par Hain! Fun on the Run	Manmohan Tiwari	

=== Television ===
Year	Show	Role	Notes
1991–1992	Neem Ka Ped		
1997–2000	Jai Hanuman	Tulsidas	
1999	Agnichakra		
2001	CID	Naresh	Episode "The case of two Abhijeet"
2001–2002	Parsai Kehte Hai		
2002	Ved Vyas Ke Pote	Bheem Vyas	
2002	Maharathi Karn	Pandu	
2004	Noddy Aur Daddy	Mr. Dubey	
2004	Shree Sifarashi Lal		
2005–2006	Chamcha in Chief		
2005	Hari Mirchi Lal Mirchi	Vinod Aggarwal/Sohan Jhunjhunwala	
2006	Sarabhai vs Sarabhai	Mr. Cindolin	Episode 70
2006–2008	Aek Chabhi Hai Padoss Mein	Shukha Singh	
2008–2013	Astitva...Ek Pehchan	Sujit	
2008–2009	Jasuben Jayantilaal Joshi Ki Joint Family	Chandrakant Jayantilaal Joshi (Chandu)	
2009–2014	Lapataganj	Mukundilal Gupta	
2011	Chidiya Ghar	Ramleela actor	Guest
2013	Hum Aapke Hain In Laws	Roshanlal Grover	
2014	Khushiyon Kii Gullak Aashi	Vishnu	
2015–2026	Bhabiji Ghar Par Hain!	Manmohan Tiwari	Lead role

== See also ==
- List of Indian television actors
