= Lapataganj =

Indian television series

- Season 2 logo
- Also known as: Lapataganj – Sharad Joshi Ki Kahaniyon Ka Pata (season 1); Lapataganj – Ek Baar Phir (season 2)
- Genre: Sitcom
- Based on: Lapataganj by Sharad Joshi
- Written by: Harsh Limbachiyaa
- Directed by: Dharam Verma
- Music by: Abhijeet Hegdepatil
- Country of origin: India
- Original language: Hindi
- No. of seasons: 2
- No. of episodes: 1077

Production
- Executive producer: Nisheeth Neerav Neelkanth
- Producer: Ashwini Dheer
- Running time: 25 minutes

Original release
- Network: SAB TV
- Release: 26 October 2009 – 15 August 2014

Lapataganj – Sharad Joshi Ki Kahaniyon Ka Pata is an Indian television sitcom, aired on Sony SAB from October 2009 to 15 August 2014. The series is based on Sharad Joshi’s novel of the same name.

The show was produced by Ashwini Dheer and directed by Dharam Verma. Joshi's daughter Neha Sharad was the creative head of the show for the first six months.

Lapatagnj starred Rohitash Gaud, Vineet Kumar, Preeti Amin, Sucheta, Shubhangi Gokhale, and the first episode aired on 26 October 2009.

== Synopsis ==
Based in an imaginary small town called Lapataganj (meaning a lost place), the story is inspired by the writings of Sharad Joshi, who was a Hindi satirist. His wide range of works has highlighted the bitter truth of Indian society with a satirical punch. These stories, while making viewers laugh, also make them empathise with the situations people face in their daily lives.

Lapataganj is a town in some part of India which has been long forgotten by the system. The town struggles daily for basic facilities, yet the people residing there are the happiest of the lot. The show captures the spirit of the common man to lead a happy life against all odds.

== Cast ==
- Rohitashv Gaud as Mukundilal Gupta
- Sucheta Khanna as Indumati Gupta, Mukundi's wife
- Vineet Kumar as Kachua Prasad/Kachua Chacha
- Shubhangi Gokhale as Mishri Mausi
- Neel Patel as Chukundi
- Anup Upadhyay as Chhotu Mama/Mamaji
- Krishna Bhatt as Elizabeth Yadav/Elija
- Rakesh Srivastav as Lallan
- Mamta Gurnani/ Mamta Verma as Bindumati
- Kajal Nishad as Chameli, Lallan's sister
- Sunil Singh as Suttilal
- Soma Rathod as Mircha, Sutti Lal's wife
- Abbas Khan as Biji Pandey and his twin brother Eji Pandey
- Preeti Amin as Surili (2009-2012)
- Aditi Tailang as Surili (2013 onwards)
- Shilpa Shinde as Mary Demello (season 2)
- Vineet Raina as Bajrang Bajpai/Lakhan (season 2)
- Ashutosh Sinha as Guddu
- Firoz Ali as Thakursaab
- Neeraj Yadav as Consultant

== Awards ==
The show and its actors won awards during its run time - including Indian Telly Awards, Indian Television Academy Awards, Zee Gold Awards.
