= Rituraj Singh (actor) =

Indian television actor (1964–2024)

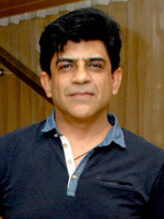
- Singh in 2015
- Born: 23 May 1964; Kota, Rajasthan, India
- Died: 20 February 2024 (aged 59); Mumbai, Maharashtra, India
- Occupation: Actor
- Years active: 1988–2024

Rituraj Singh (23 May 1964 – 20 February 2024) was an Indian television actor who worked prominently with Bollywood. He played different roles in a number of Indian TV shows like Banegi Apni Baat aired on Zee TV in 1993, Jyoti, Hitler Didi, Shapath, Warrior High, Aahat, Adaalat, and Diya Aur Baati Hum. He also played the role of Balwant Chodhary in the Colors TV serial Laado 2.

== Early life ==
Rituraj Singh's full name was Rituraj Singh Chandrawat Sisodia. He was born on 23 May 1964 in Kota, Rajasthan, to a Sisodia Rajput family. Even though a native of Rajasthan, he did not properly live in his home state. Singh did his schooling in Delhi. He then moved to the United States, before returning to India at the age of 12. He moved and settled in Mumbai in 1993.

== Career ==
Singh worked in theatre in Delhi along with Barry John's Theatre Action Group (TAG) for 12 years and was featured in the popular Hindi TV game show, Tol Mol Ke Bol, broadcast on Zee TV. Singh was also part of a web series titled Abhay available on Zee5. This web series marked the digital debut of Kunal Khemu.

== Death ==
Singh died of a cardiac arrest on 20 February 2024, at the age of 59. He was undergoing treatment for pancreatic ailments.

== Filmography ==
=== Films ===
Year	Title	Role	Note(s)
1992	Miss Beatty's Children		
2010	Hum Tum Aur Ghost	Boxer Aslam	
2011	The Masterpiece	Filmmaker (voice)	short
2011	Prakata Het Yad	Appa	short
2017	Badrinath Ki Dulhania	Badri's father	
2021	Satyameva Jayate 2	Madan Lal Joshi	
2023	Vash: Possessed by the Obsessed	Shastri	
2023	Thunivu	Sunil Dutta	Tamil film
2023	Yaariyan 2	Shikhar's team member	
2026	Pooja Meri Jaan	Asad Mehfooz	

=== Television ===
Year	Title	Role	Notes
1989	In Which Annie Gives It Those Ones	Arjun	Television film
1991	Suno re Kissa	Raja	Theatrical Play
1993	Tol Mol Ke Bol	Host	
1993	Banegi Apni Baat	Vikram	
1993	Yule Love Story		
1994	Mr Shrimati		TV film
1994	Tehkikaat	Ramesh Lal	
1997	Jaane Kahan Mera Jigar Gaya Ji		
1999	Aashiqui		
1999	Rishtey - The Love Stories	Sadanand	
2000	Ghar Ek Mandir		
2001	Rishtey - The Love Stories	Ravi Bhatnagar	
2001	Kutumb	Ajay Mittal	
2002	Kittie Party		
2002	Sanjivani - A Medical Boon		
2004	K. Street Pali Hill	Aditya Khandelwal	
2004	Kahaani Ghar Ghar Kii	Sanjay Doshi	
2007	Ek Ladki Anjaani Si	Abhinav Raheja	
2007	Kulvaddhu	Amit Sahay	
2007	Jeete Hain Jiske Liye	Tarun Moolchandani	
2007	Jersey No. 10	Arjun's father	
2009	CID	Deven	episode:" Khoon Ka Raaj..Ek Aawaz"
2009	CID	Hiten	episode: "Khooni Khabar"
2009	Ssshhhh...Phir Koi Hai		Story: "Intezaar"
2010	CID	Dr Sunil	episode: "Ek Khoon Do Baar"
2010	Star One Haunted Nights	Doctor	story: "Haunted Hospital"
2010	Adaalat	Trikon	
2010	Jyoti	Kabir's father	
2011	Hitler Didi	Inder sharma,Kala Diwan Chandela	
2011	Diya Aur Baati Hum	Mahendra Singh	
2012	SuperCops vs Supervillains	DCP Kamalkant / Nikhil	
2013	Beintehaa	Ghulam Haider	
2013	Ekk Nayi Pehchaan	Sharda's professor	
2014	Satrangi Sasural	Rajesh Vatsal	
2015	Aahat	DSP	
2015	Warrior High	Pankaj Malhotra	
2016	Meri Awaaz Hi Pehchaan Hai	Sohrab Mistry	
2016	Trideviyaan	Dinanath Chauhan	
2017	Laado 2 - Veerpur Ki Mardani	Balwant Choudhary	
2019	Yeh Rishta Kya Kehlata Hai	Purushottam Ajmera	
2019	Abhay	Kuldeep Dhingra (KD)	
2019	Criminal Justice	Naresh Lakhani	
2020	Bandish Bandits	Harshvardhan	
2020–2021	Never Kiss Your Best Friend	Sumer's Father	
2022	Made in Heaven (season 2)	Radhika's Father	
2023–2024	Anupamaa	Yashpal Dhillon	
2024	Indian Police Force	Rafeeq	

=== Web ===
Year	Title	Role
2017	The Test Case	Gen. Bedi
2019	Hey Prabhu!	Ishwar Prabhu
