= Maddam Sir =

2020 Indian TV series

- Also known as: Maddam Sir – Kuch Baat Hai Kyunki Jazbaat Hai
- Genre: Comedy; Drama; Action
- Created by: Jay Mehta
- Written by: Deepak Malik; Devang Kakkad; Vikas Sharma; Sameer Garud; Lourrence Joseph John
- Screenplay by: Deepak Mallik; Devang Kakkad Vikas Sharma; Sameer Garud
- Directed by: Hemen Chauhan
- Creative director: Taiyyab Mallik
- Starring: Gulki Joshi; Yukti Kapoor; Sonali Pandit Naik; Bhavika Sharma; Priyanshu Singh; Ajay Jadhav
- Theme music composer: Lalit Sen
- Opening theme: Maddam Sir theme music
- Country of origin: India
- Original language: Hindi
- No. of seasons: 1
- No. of episodes: 741 (list of episodes)

Production
- Producers: Jay Mehta; Kinnari Mehtaa
- Cinematography: Rahul B Soni
- Editors: Pankaj Kathpal; Rahul Mathur
- Camera setup: Multi-camera
- Running time: 22–26 minutes
- Production company: Jay Production

Original release
- Network: Sony SAB
- Release: 24 February 2020 – 18 February 2023

Maddam Sir is an Indian Hindi comedy action television series which aired from 24 February 2020 to 18 February 2023 on Sony SAB and digitally streamed on SonyLIV. Produced by Jay Mehta for Jay Productions, it stars Gulki Joshi, Yukti Kapoor, Sonali Naik, Bhavika Sharma, Priyanshu Singh and Ajay Jadhav.

== Plot ==
Four Lucknow-based female police officers and one male officer work at a Mahila police station: SHO Haseena Mallik, SI Karishma Singh, Head Constable Pushpa Singh, Constable Santosh Sharma, and Constable Cheeteshwar Chaturvedi. They are assisted by prisoner-turned-spy Billeshwar Champat. Short-tempered Karishma and emotional Haseena often clash while solving cases.

DSP Anubhav Singh, Karishma's cousin and a negotiation specialist, helps resolve their differences. He and Haseena fall in love, but Haseena later discovers that Anubhav only pretended to love her for a national-security mission. After completing it, he realises he genuinely loved her, apologises and proposes marriage. She initially rejects him, fearing further heartbreak, but eventually accepts. Anubhav is then ordered to leave Lucknow for a potentially fatal national-security mission, and, with Karishma's help, sends Haseena away to protect her.

The Mahila Thana receives a humanoid, ASI Mira, on a ninety-day trial to teach her human emotions. Karishma initially resents her, believing she will replace human officers, but they solve cases together. When a secret agent gives Haseena a hard disk containing details of the country's secret agents, terrorists hack Mira to obtain it and order her to kill Haseena. Mira fires at her before realising what she has done and alerting the station. The officers discover that Mira has developed the emotions Haseena wanted her to have, but dismantle her to prevent further hacking.

A month later, Pushpa and Karishma meet Urmila Mahadev Mhatre in Mumbai, Haseena's lookalike, and a Marathi vada pav seller. Karishma takes Urmila to Lucknow, posing her as Haseena to catch Haseena's killers. Urmila is actually Haseena in disguise, working for secret agent Ajay to catch terrorists seeking the hard disk, whose contents threaten national security. Haseena suspects Anubhav, but changes her mind after Anubhav saves her from goons. Haseena reveals her identity to Anubhav and learns of the hard disk. However, she discovers that Anubhav is behind the plot, steals the disk from Karishma and publicly brands him a traitor. Karishma destroys the disk, then Haseena and Karishma shoot Anubhav; Haseena loses her memory and believes she is Urmila but later she regains her memory and rejoins the MPT.

Amar Vidrohi and his team join the MPT, creating rivalry. Cheeta and Santosh fall in love, while Haseena goes underground to clear her name. Amar eventually recognises that the MPT belongs to Haseena's team and leaves. Misri Pandey becomes the new SHO, but she and her politician uncle frame Haseena. They are arrested, allowing Haseena to return.

Karishma's twin sister Kaushalya (Kareena), who had run away with money their father saved for Karishma's police admission to pursue acting, returns to Lucknow. She asks Karishma to train her for a film in which she plays a police officer. Kareena befriends the MPT team, and Haseena arranges for the officers to exchange roles with her to understand one another's challenges. Karishma forgives her after learning of her sacrifices for their father. The team then discovers that terrorists are unwittingly using Kareena as a suicide bomber and saves her. Kareena leaves for Chennai to pursue acting.

The Chingari Gang attempts to replace the police by torturing and traumatising guilty men. After several failed attempts to stop them, Karishma infiltrates the gang. When Cheetah falls in love online with Binni, a gang member, Haseena instructs him to continue the relationship to gather evidence. Haseena also discovers Karishma's infiltration and tells her to continue. Gang leader Shivani expels Binni after learning of the relationship; Binni then exposes Karishma. Shivani attempts to kill her but is stopped by Haseena's team, accidentally killing Saira Begum instead. Shivani accepts responsibility for the gang's crimes and surrenders.

Mira returns as Mira G, an upgraded version capable of predicting crimes, but is sent back to the C.A.R.D. Research Institute after being shot on her wristwatch.

ACP Naina Mathur comes to Lucknow seeking criminal Cherry. Haseena and Karishma catch Cherry when she attempts to kill Naina, prompting Naina to return to her hometown.

Aspiring police officer Shaziya Siddiqui arrives at the MPT, claiming to be Haseena's cousin and seeking her help with police exams. In reality, she has fled Devariya, where two brothers suppress women's ambitions and have kidnapped her mother, Nagma, to force her return. The MPT team, aided by Santu, Mira G, Misri and Shivani, now a lawyer at the Allahabad High Court, rescues Shaziya and Nagma. Haseena and Karishma expose the local MLA's failure to maintain law and order, prompting him to vow revenge. Haseena is promoted to DSP, but the MPT station is bombed and the media reports the team's deaths. Months later, Haseena narrates her journey with the MPT, revealing that she survived the blast.

== Cast ==
=== Main ===
- Gulki Joshi as SHO Haseena Malik, a.k.a. Maddam Sir (2020–2023): Shahjahan and Noorjahan's daughter; Anubhav's love-interest and ex-fiancée; Karishma's mentor and close friend, and Naina's friend and batchmate. At the end of series, she is promoted to DSP and indicates that she survived the fatal blast at MPT.
- Yukti Kapoor as
  - SI Karishma Singh (2020–2023): Kaushalya's elder twin sister; Anubhav's cousin; Pushpa and Pyare's daughter-in-law; protective of Haseena
  - Kaushalya Singh, alias Kareena (2022): An actress; Karishma's younger twin sister; Anubhav's cousin
- Bhavika Sharma as Cybercrime Specialist Constable Santosh "Santu" Sharma (2020–2022; 2023): Cheetah's love interest; suspended due to Cheetah's negligence
- Sonali Pandit Naik as head constable Pushpa Singh (2020–2023): MPT's oldest member; Pyare's widow; and Karishma's mother-in-law
- Yashkant Sharma as Constable Cheeteshwar "Cheetah" Chaturvedi (2020): A women's psychologist at MPT and Santu's love interest
  - Priyanshu Singh replaced Yashkant as Constable Cheteshwar "Cheetah" Chaturvedi (2020—2023)
- Ajay Jadhav as
  - Billeshwar "Billu" Champat (2020–2023): A thief-turned-spy; enjoys living in jail because he has nowhere else to live
  - Commissioner Vikram Ghosh (2023): Billu's lookalike, Lucknow's new commissioner, and Shobhna's husband

=== Recurring ===
- Satyapal Landge as Badnaam (2020–2023): Tea vendor near the MPT
- Ashwani Rathore as Iqbal (2020–2023): The local barber
- Darpan Shrivastava as Usman (2020): A local biriyani vendor; replaced by Harveer Singh
- Gaurav Wadhwa as Sunny Chaddha (2020, 2022): A reporter who has a crush on Santosh
  - Jatin Arora replaced Wadhwa as Sunny Chaddha (2020–2021)
- Rajesh Dubey as DSP Mahesh Singh (2020–2023): Anubhav's predecessor as DSP
- Umesh Bajpai as Faqruddin Nawab Ahmed "Nawab Sahab" (2020–2023): Owner of the MPT building and Raees and Zeenat's father; has a crush on Head Constable Pushpa Singh
- Nimesh Soni as
  - Bulbul Pandey (2020–2023): SHO of Jankipooram Police Thana, Pallavi's husband; Champak's senior and brother-in-law
  - Kartik Bajaj (2020): Misogynistic cab company owner
  - Balli (2020): Dishonest owner of the LPJ diet-plan company
- Amit Kumar Sinha as
  - Tuteja's secretary (2020)
  - Manohar: Mehra's Manager (2020)
  - Suresh Saxena: Asthana's Secretary (2020)
  - Champak Chaudhary : A Janakipuram Police Thaana constable, Pallavi's brother (2020–2023)
- Disha Savla as Pallavi Pandey (2020, 2022–2023): Champak's sister and Bulbul's wife
- Rahil Azam as DSP Anubhav Singh(2020–2022): An IB negotiation specialist and Lucknow DSP, Karishma and Kaushalya 's cousin, and Haseena's ex-fiancé. When he turns evil, Karishma and Haseena kill him.
- Esha Kansara as SI/SHO Misri Pandey (2020, 2022–2023): A corrupt police officer who temporarily comes to MPT
- Roopa Divetia as Noorjahan Malik (2021): Haseena's mother;
  - Utkarsha Naik replaced Divetia as Noorjahan (2021–2023)
- Salman Shaikh as Rajvir Tomar, a.k.a. Computer (2021): Head constable of Jankipooram Police Thaana who has a crush on Karishma Singh, unaware that she is married
- Jignesh Modi as Chedi (2021): Jankipooram Police Thaana constable
- Pankhuri Awasthy Rode as ASI Mira (2021–2022, 2022, 2023): A humanoid robot police officer invented by C.A.R.D. Research Institute, who was sent to MPT for a ninety-day trial to learn emotions under Karishma Singh. She shoots Haseena, and returns to the MPT as Mira G.
- Prakash Ramchandani as Secret Agent Ajay Bakshi (2021–2023): Anubhav's senior, who saves Haseena's life and asks her to pose as Mumbai vada pav vendor Urmila Mahadev Mhatre to catch the people who tried to murder her for the hard disk
- Savi Thakur as SHO Amar Vidrohi (2022): Yogita's younger brother, Bunty's adoptive father who is temporarily in charge of the MPT
- Jay Pathak as Harendra Singh, a.k.a. Deewan Ji (2022): MPT head constable under Amar Vidrohi
- Rachana Parulkar as Advocate Shivani Pawar, a.k.a. Shivani Tai (2022–2023): Chingaari Gang leader turned Allahabad High Court advocate
- Prachi Bohra as Binny Chaudhary (2022): Chingaari Gang member
- Sulabha Arya as Saira Begum (2022): Founder of the Chingaari Gang who is accidentally shot dead by Shivani

=== Guest ===
- Hiral Jain as Shanti, MPT's former worker (2020)
- Trishna Vivek as
  - Dr. Archana Nagar, who performed illegal gender tests (2020)
  - Sudha Narayan, an NCG officer who suspected that Haseena was a drug smuggler (2020)
- Adi Irani as Gyanprakash Tuteja, fraud educational institute's chief (2020)
- Shruti Rawat as Parvati, female driver who was blamed for a car crash (2020)
- Sudesh Berry as Angad Acharya, Public vigilante whose people misbehaved with youths (2020)
- Ananya Dwivedi as Zoya, a child with kidney disease whose doctor donates a kidney to her (2020)
- Rishikesh Ingley as
  - Dr. Vikas, Zoya's doctor (2020)
  - Vikram, a cyber cell officer who challenges Karishma Singh for a cricket match (2020)
  - Rahul, a dishonest cashier (2021)
- Mohak Khurana as Roshan, online fraudster who made a fake website (2020)
- Mahi Sharma as
  - Mahi, the fake Karishma Singh (2020)
  - Nancy, Victor's wife (2020)
  - Nisha Amrit, Roshni's mother, a social-media blogger accused of involvement in a terrorist association (2021)
- Neha Tiwari as Chandu, the fake Santosh Sharma (2020)
- Shefali Rana as the fake Pushpa Singh (2020)
- Pallavi Pradhan as Savitri Singh, Ajay's mother who has Alzheimer's (2020)
- Amish Tanna as Ashok, caretaker of poor children orphanage (2020)
- Sumit Arora as:
  - Brijesh, Haldi's Second husband (2020)
  - Kartik, a man who overloved his wife (2022)
- Divyangana Jain as:
  - Rani (2020—2021), a career criminal
  - Cherry (2023), a criminal mastermind who is arrested by Haseena and Karishma
- Amika Shail as
  - Antara, who criticized for staying with her male friend (2020)
  - Naagin, Naagmani Mystery Case (2020)
  - Divya, Trapped by a blackmailer (2021)
- Shilpa Shinde as ACP Naina Mathur (2023), Haseena's batchmate and friend
- Vaishali Thakkar as Head Constable Babita Sarkar (2020), a temporary replacement for Pushpa who had trained Haseena and Karishma
- Roopam Sharma as Mona (2021), a corrupt clinical psychologist
- Lakshya Handa as Avtaar Kapoor (2021), Karishma's boss
- Kavita Kaushik as IPS Chandramukhi Chautala from F.I.R. (2022)
- Shubhangi Gokhale as Cheeteshwar's aunt (2022)
- Simmi Ghoshal as
  - A victim of the online fraud (2020)
  - Binno, a victim of noise pollution (2021)
- Guru Saran Tiwari as Yash Kapoor, director of Kareena's film, who is involved with terrorist group which tried to use Kareena as a suicide bomber (2022)
- Tanya Abrol as Dipti, a female wrestler who is the victim of discrimination (2021)
- Govind Khatri as Mahipal Singh (2021): Genda's husband, Mansi's father, Haseena's adoptive uncle, and owner of Prasuti Charitable Hospital.
- Hunar Hali Gandhi as Genda Rani (2021): Mahipal's wife and Mansi's adoptive mother, mastermind of the conspiracy to inject a virus into pregnant women at Prasuti Charitable Hospital
- Swasti Katyal as Mansi Singh, Mahipal's daughter and Genda's adopted daughter (2021)
- Tarka Pednekar as
  - Gauri, Asthana's sister (2020)
  - Manu, Rani's right hand and advisor (2021)
  - Dolly, a divorcee who is harassed by her boss (2021)
- Anupama Prakash as Ileana, Billu's girlfriend (2020)
- Manoj Chandila as
  - Ajay Kumar, an actor who insults Pushpa Singh and the police (2020)
  - Manav, Radhe's boss (2020)
  - Kareena's co-star in her film (2022)
- Pranay Dixit as
  - An actor who is invited to Santosh Sharma's fake wedding (2020)
  - Mr. Joseph, head chef of the Yo Kabab company (2020)
  - Victor, Nancy's husband who is involved with the dangerous criminal Musa (2020)
  - Shankar, Haldi's first husband who blackmails her (2020)
  - Shekhar, who wants his wife Pallavi to focus on herself instead of her family (2021)
  - Rohit, Chandrika's husband (2021)
  - Abhinav Jasuja, a gym owner falsely accused of domestic violence by his wife (2021)
  - Mukesh aka Qaidi Zameer, a detective-novel writer (2021)
  - Subod, Jharna's husband (2021)
  - Rohit, Mayui's husband who cheats on her (2022)
  - Manav, president of M.S fan club (2022)
  - Sunny Batra, director of Star advertising agency who fired his employee Deepti because she was pregnant (2022)
  - Arun, a man who pretends to be blind (2022)
  - Raj, Simran's Husband, whose parents pressurize him to become a father (2022)
  - Narayan, Dhanalakshmi's husband, who hides his phone from his wife to conceal his financial problems (2022)
  - Barkha's husband, who tortured his wife (2023)
- Preeti Shukhla as
  - Sona, Montu's wife (2020)
  - Simran, Rahul's wife, who brought a bomb to MPT (2020)
  - Chandrika, Rohit's wife, who hires a detective to investigate her husband (2021)
  - Rupa Jasuja, Abhinav's wife, who falsely accuses her husband of domestic violence (2021)
  - Jharna, Subod's wife (2021)
  - Manju, a nurse pressured by her career and family (2022)
  - Trisha, who has hallucinations (2022)
  - Meethi Shukla, who seizes her landlord's house with her mother-in-law (2022)
- Kunnal Sheth as
  - Monty Sharma, Sona's husband, who created App Zara to replace wives (2020)
  - Radhe, Haseena's helper who was denied paternity leave (2020)
  - Gopal, fake husbands of Nawab Sahab's unmarried tenants (2020)
  - Keshav, pressured by his boss to work at the expense of his wife (2021)
  - Kailash, cheated by an online friend (2021)
  - Jaidev, an actor in pan masala advertisements (2021)
  - Akash Khanna, a resident of sukhinagar where there is water shortage (2022)
  - Manu, Tanu's husband who is five years younger (2022)
  - Rohan Acharya, owner of the Ummidhai website where poor people receive medical help (2022)
  - Kamal Sharma, an amnesiac abandoned by his brother (2022)
- Urvi Gor as
  - Alia, mistreated by her brother-in-law (2021)
  - Trisha Gulati, kidnapped on New Year's Eve (2021)
  - Roshni, a thief with a sham marriage to Cheetah Chaturvedi (2022)
  - Karuna, A student of Triveni college and principal's daughter (2022)
- Soneer Vadhera as
  - Rahul Mallya, Simran's husband who threatened to explode a bomb to gain his in-laws' respect (2020)
  - Shekhar, Shikha's husband, whose newborn child was stolen (2020)
  - Ashok, an alcoholic who annoyed his wife (2021)
  - Rajesh, Indu's husband (2022)
- Urmila Tiwari as
  - Anita Chauhan, Vijay's wife (2020)
  - Shalini, a beauty-parlour owner who is cheated in a dating app (2021)
  - Pratha, a girl forced to follow superstitious rituals by her mother (2021)
  - Priyali Singh, the fake Aparna Bansal (2021)
  - Nafeesa Ansari, a female don who conducted fake crowdfunding campaigns (2022)
  - Radha Rani, Lalit's Wife, who demands expensive stuff from her husband (2022)
  - Asha, Badnam's sister (2022)
- Pawan Singh as
  - Musa, a dangerous criminal involved in illegal betting (2020)
  - Lalit Kumar, Radha Rani's husband, he is scared from his wife because of her expensive demands (2022)
- Preeti Puri as Shalini Shekhar: A widow persuaded to remarry by her daughter (2021)
- Shrashti Maheshwari as Riya, the commissioner's daughter who came to MPT to write about the station (2022)
- Piya Valecha as Mrs. Malkhani, owner of the Batterfly club (2021)
- Amit Mistry as Vijay Chauhan, Anita's husband (2020)
- Dolly Chawla as
  - Haldi, Brijesh's wife, who was mistreated by her ex-husband's parents (2020)
  - Indu, Rajesh's wife (2022)
- Apara Jariwala as Sarita Singh, Pushpa's aunt-in-law; Karishma's grand-aunt-in-law (2022)
- Tejal Adivarekar as Malaika, Pushpa and Karishma's home help (2021–2022)
- Ashish Pawar as Sajan, Urmila's (Haseena's) supporter, friend and admirer (2022)
- Prem Vallabh as Mr. Chaturvedi, Cheeta's father (2022)
- Anju Rajiv as Mrs. Chaturvedi, Cheeta's mother (2022)
- Anupama Solanki as Deepti, a creative director with an advertising agency (2022)
- Abhay Bhadoriya as Bunty, a blackmailing teenager addicted to pizza (2022)
- Aman Mishra as Adil Shaikh, an arms dealer chosen by Haseena for her marriage (2022)
- Akansha Sharma as Rama, Karishma's best friend in childhood (2022)
- Rakhi Sawant as Begum, a thief along with her lover, Badshah (2021)
- Ketan Singh as Badshah, a thief along with his lover, Begum (2021)
- Tunisha Sharma as ASP Aditi Jammwal from Hero - Gayab Mode On (2021)
- Deepak Pareek as Honourable Secretary Advocate Dakshesh Joshipura from Wagle Ki Duniya - Nayi Peedhi Naye Kissey (2021)
- Sayantani Ghosh as Daljeet Bagga from Tera Yaar Hoon Main (2021)
- Vijay Kashyap as Col. Pushpinder Batra, director of Parakram SAF from Ziddi Dil Maane Na
- Gulfam Khan as Mrs. Batra from Ziddi Dil Maane Na
- Karan Veer Mehra as Abhay, Koel's husband from Ziddi Dil Maane Na
- Prathmesh Sharma as Bala, Parakram SAF cadet from Ziddi Dil Maane Na
- Shaleen Malhotra as Special Agent Karan Shergill from Ziddi Dil Maane Na
- Kaveri Priyam as Cadet Dr. Monami Mahajan from Ziddi Dil Maane Na
- Kunal Karan Kapoor as Cadet Siddharth Ganju from Ziddi Dil Maane Na
- Diljot Kaur Chhabra as Special Agent Sanjana Dubey from Ziddi Dil Maane Na
- Aditya Deshmukh as Special Agent Faizuddin Siddiqui from Ziddi Dil Maane Na
- Simple Kaul as Cadet Koel Roy from Ziddi Dil Maane Na
- Ankit Bathla as Kabir (2021)

== Production ==
=== Development ===
Before its premiere, the series was entitled Mahila Police Thana. In early February 2020, the main cast promoted it in Lucknow.

=== Casting ===
Bhavika Sharma left the series in 2022 because she was unhappy with the development of her character.

== Controversy ==
Shilpa Shinde, cast as Naina Mathur, said that the crew was "not being serious about work" and accused the producers of "not giving [a] satisfactory role to her" days after her arrival. Joshi and Sonali Naik responded, "If we were so unprofessional then the show wouldn't have existed for three long years." Joshi added, "Audience is the best judge and all the fifteen minutes of fame can rest in peace."

Shinde later posted a three-minute video on Instagram, and accused Joshi and Naik of insulting her:

Who's Gulki Joshi? What has she done in her career? She became popular due to me ... Cast can't accept some positive changes in show with new entries when the show is on the verge of getting off-air and the TRPs increased due to me.

Joshi responded,

She abused our whole cast for the sake of limelight and I'm really very grateful to her that I'm getting so much love and support due to this controversy and my followers also increased due to same.

== Crossovers ==
The Big Shanivaar was a mahasangam (crossover) of all Sony SAB's on-going shows (except Taarak Mehta Ka Ooltah Chashmah) telecast on 9 October 2021 to promote Sony SAB's Saturday lineup.

Another edition of The Big Shanivaar was telecast on 20 November 2021 to celebrate Diwali in the Parakram SAF and to help its cadet, Koel Roy, escape from her husband.

Shaam Shaandar, a one-hour New Year's special, was broadcast on 31 December 2021 with Ziddi Dil Maane Na and Wagle Ki Duniya – Nayi Peedhi Naye Kissey.

In March 2022, Kavita Kaushik from F.I.R. appeared as a guest reprising the role of Chandramukhi Chautala.

In October 2023, Gulki Joshi appeared as a guest in Vanshaj reprising the role of Haseena Malik.

In October 2024, Gulki Joshi appears as a guest in Wagle Ki Duniya – Nayi Peedhi Naye Kissey reprising the role of Haseena Malik.

== Sequel ==
After a three-year run, the series went off the air on 18 February 2023. Producer Kinnari Mehta later announced that it would return for a second season. The cast, as Team MPT, later announced their return for season two.

== Awards and nominations ==
Year	Award	Category	Nominee	Result	Ref.
2021	Indian Telly Awards	Best Actor in a Lead Role Male	Rahil Azam	Nominated	
2022	Indian Television Academy Awards	Popular Show – Drama	Maddam Sir	Nominated	
2022	Indian Television Academy Awards	Popular Actress – Comedy	Yukti Kapoor	Nominated	
2022	Indian Television Academy Awards	Popular Actress – Comedy	Gulki Joshi	Nominated	
2022	Indian Television Academy Awards	Popular Actress – Comedy	Sonali Pandit Naik	Nominated	
2022	Indian Television Academy Awards	Popular Actress – Comedy	Bhavika Sharma	Nominated	
2022	Indian Television Academy Awards	Best Director – Comedy	Hemen Chauhan	Nominated	
2023	Indian Telly Awards	Best Sitcom / Comedy Programme	Maddam Sir	Won	

== See also ==
- List of Hindi comedy shows
