= Kunal Karan Kapoor =

Indian actor

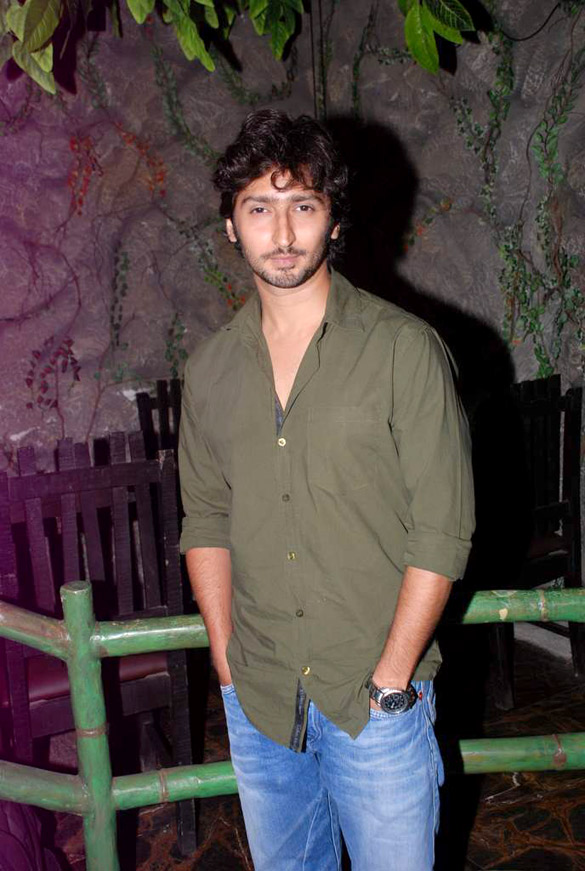
- Kapoor in 2012
- Born: 22 August 1982 (age 44)
- Occupations: Actor; photographer; traveller
- Years active: 2004—present
- Known for: Remix; Left Right Left; Na Bole Tum Na Maine Kuch Kaha; Ziddi Dil Maane Na

Kunal Karan Kapoor (born 22 August 1982) is an Indian actor known for his roles in Na Bole Tum Na Maine Kuch Kaha, Doli Armaanon Ki and Woh Apna Sa.

== Career ==
=== Debut and early career (2004–2011) ===
In 2004, Kapoor debuted in his first TV serial, Remix, which aired on channel Star One. His next serial was Left Right Left for Sab TV in 2006. It was around this time that he changed his screen name to avoid any confusion with film actor Kunal Kapoor. He added his father's name, Karan, as a middle name.

In 2008 he appeared as Monty in the serial Meet Mila De Rabba for Sony Entertainment Television, and in 2009 he played Sukhi Singh in Maayka for Zee Anmol. Then in 2009, he portrayed Angad Yadav, a negative character in Star Plus' Mann Kee Awaaz Pratigya. His performance in this serial received good reviews. In 2010 he played Amrik Singh in the Colors TV serial Rishton Se Badi Pratha.

=== Breakthrough and further success (2012–2018) ===
At the end of 2011, he got a lead role in the Colors TV serial Na Bole Tum Na Maine Kuch Kaha. Kapoor had auditioned for the production house some time earlier and Sudhir Sharma of Sunshine Productions saw that audition tape. He felt that Kapoor was best suited to play the male lead opposite stage actress Aakanksha Singh. The serial started airing on 9 January 2012. Kapoor played the role of rustic, carefree, righteous reporter Mohan Bhatnagar. His performance was applauded by TV industry professionals, the media and viewers. His role was later termed 'iconic' and the serial was called a cult show.

On 14 January 2013, Na Bole Tum Na Maine Kuch Kaha returned for a second season by public demand. On 4 May 2013 Kapoor won the award for Best Male Actor in a Lead Role at the 2013 Indian Telly Awards for his performance as Mohan Bhatnagar.

In 2015 Kapoor appeared in Doli Armaano Ki as Shaurya Sinha, owner and editor of a newspaper. He had worked with the production house before on Maan ki awaaz Pratigya and Rishton Se Badi Pratha. In 2018 he appeared as corrupt police inspector Krishna Shekhawat in Zee TV's serial Woh Apna Sa.

=== Established actor (2019–present) ===
In 2019 Kapoor entered web space and acted in the web series The Raikar Case, a family mystery thriller. This series was released on OTT platform VootSelect on 9 April 2020. He played Mohit Naik Raikar. The second season of The Raikar Case is said to be in the pipeline.

From 2021 to 2022, he played Siddharth Ganju in Ziddi Dil Maane Na on Sony SAB. In 2023, he replace Zaan Khan as Saransh Tiwari in Zee TV's Maitree. In April 2024, he portrayed Ranvijay in Colors TV's popular show Udaariyaan. In early April 2025, he playing Vikram Nanda in Colors TV's sitcom Zyada Mat Udd. In mid April 2025, was cast as Laxman in Sony SAB's Tenali Rama.

== Filmography ==
=== Television ===
Year	Title	Role	Notes	Ref.
1994	Rajani	Master Kunal Kapoor	Child artist	
2004–2006	Remix	Varun	Lead Role	
2006–2008	Left Right Left	Cadet Yadhuvansh "Yudi" Sahni	Lead Role	
2008–2009	Meet Mila De Rabba	Monty	-	
2009	Maayka	Sukhi Singh	-	
2009–2010	Mann Kee Awaaz Pratigya	Angad Yadav	Villain Role	
2010–2011	Rishton Se Badi Pratha	Amrik Singh	-	
2012–2013	Na Bole Tum Na Maine Kuch Kaha	Mohan "Monu" Bhatnagar	Main Lead Role	
2013	Na Bole Tum Na Maine Kuch Kaha	Vasu Rajvardhan	Main Lead Role	
2015	Doli Armaano Ki	Shaurya Sinha	Main Lead Role	
2018	Woh Apna Sa	Inspector Krishna Shikhawat	Main Lead Role	
2021–2022	Ziddi Dil Maane Na	Siddharth "Sid" Ganju	Main Lead Role	
2022	Good Night India-Raatwala Family Show	Siddharth "Sid" Ganju	Guest appearances	
2023	Maitree	Saransh Tiwari	Villain Role	
2024	Udaariyaan	Ranvijay "RV" Singh Gill	Cameo Role	
2025	Zyada Mat Udd	Vikram Nanda	Cameo Role	
2025	Tenali Rama	Laxamanappa Swaminarayan Bhattaru	-	
2025	Pyaar mein sab chalta hai (vertical dram)	Kabir	Lead role	
2026–present	Shayad Yahi Hai Pyaar	Gaurav Gulati	Parallel Lead	

==== Crossover and Special appearances ====
Year	Title	Role	Ref.
2012	Balika Vadhu	Mohan Bhatnagar as cameo	
2012	Madhubala – Ek Ishq Ek Junoon	Mohan Bhatnagar as cameo	
2012	Sasural Simar Ka	Mohan Bhatnagar as cameo	
2013	Uttaran	Mohan Bhatnagar as cameo	
2021	Maddam Sir	Siddharth Ganju as Crossover Cameo	
2021	Wagle Ki Duniya – Nayi Peedhi Naye Kissey	Siddharth Ganju as Crossover Cameo	

=== Micro Drama ===
Year	Title	Role	Production
2025	Pyaar Mein Sab Chalta Hai	Kabir	Klip

=== Web series ===
Year	Title	Role	Production
2020	The Raikar Case	Mohit Naik Raikar	Bodhitree Multimedia & VootSelect

=== Short films ===
Year	Title	Role	Production
2018	Bhindi	Voice over	8th Wonder Production

=== Music video appearancess ===
Year	Title	Role	Co- Star	Singer(s)	Production
2017	"Adda"	Subhash	Ritabhari Chakraborty	Swanand Kirkire, Anupam Roy, Bengali Band Chandrabindu	MotherDairyMilk

== Awards and nominations ==
Year	Award	Category	Work	Result	Ref.
2013	Indian Telly Awards	Best Actor in a Lead Role	Na Bole Tum Na Maine Kuch Kaha	Won	
2013	Indian Television Academy Awards	Best Actor Popular	Na Bole Tum Na Maine Kuch Kaha	Nominated	
2022	Indian Television Academy Awards	Popular Actor Drama	Ziddi Dil Maane Na	Nominated	
