= List of programmes broadcast by Sony SAB =

This is the list of original programming currently and formerly broadcast by the Indian television channel, Sony SAB.

== Current broadcasts ==
| Premiere date | Show |
|---|---|
| 28 July 2008 | Taarak Mehta Ka Ooltah Chashmah |
| 6 June 2022 | Pushpa Impossible |
| 2 June 2026 | Hastinapur Ke Veer |
| 22 September 2026 | Kyunki Papa Kehte Hain |
| 18 November 2026 | Lo Chudail Chali Sasural |

== Former broadcasts ==
=== Comedy series ===
- A Mad House (2005)
- Aadat Se Majboor (2017–2018)
- Aaj Ke Shrimaan Shrimati (2002)
- Abhi Toh Main Jawan Hoon (2003)
- Aflatoon (2001)
- Akting-Akting (2002–2003)
- Ammaji Ki Galli (2011)
- Apna News Aayega (2019–2020)
- Bade Miya Chhote Miya (2003)
- Badi Doooor Se Aaye Hai (2014–2016)
- Bhakharwadi (2019–2020)
- Band Baaja Bandh Darwaza (2019)
- Baavle Utaavle (2019)
- Beechwale – Bapu Dekh Raha Hai (2018–2019)
- Bhaago KK Aaya (2008)
- Bhai Bhaiya Aur Brother (2012)
- Bhootwala Serial (2009)
- Chandrakant Chiplunkar Seedi Bamba Wala (2014)
- Chalti Ka Naam Gaadi...Let's Go (2015–2016)
- Chamcha in Chief (2005–2006)
- Chidiya Ghar (2011–2017)
- Chintu Chinki Aur Ek Badi Si Love Story (2011–2012)
- Chhupke Chhupke (2014)
- Daddy Samjha Karo (2000–2001)
- Dhaba Junction (2003–2004)
- Dil Deke Dekho (2016–2017)
- Don't Worry Chachu (2011–2012)
- Dr. Madhumati On Duty (2016)
- F.I.R. (2006–2015)
- Full Masti 88.2 (2008)
- Funhit Mein Jaari (2020–2021)
- Gilli Gilli Gappa (2010–2011)
- Golmaal Hai Bhai Sab Golmaal Hai (2012)
- Gopi Gadha Aur Gupshup (2012)
- The Great Indian Family Drama (2015)
- Gunwale Dulhania Le Jayenge (2009)
- Gupp Chupp (2016)
- Gutur Gu (2010–2014)
- Hansi He Hansi...Mil Toh Lein (2015)
- Hassi Woh Phassi (2003)
- Hum Aapke Ghar Mein Rehte Hain (2015)
- Hum Aapke Hain In Laws (2013)
- Humse Hai Zamana (2008)
- I Luv My India (2012)
- Jasoos 005 (2008)
- Jaankhilavan Jasoos (2010–2011)
- Jeannie Aur Juju (2012–2014)
- Jijaji Chhat Per Hain (2018–2020)
- Jijaji Chhat Parr Koii Hai (2021)
- Jugni Chali Jalandhar (2008–2010)
- Jo Biwi Se Kare Pyaar (2013)
- Kaatelal & Sons (2020–2021)
- Khatmal E Ishq (2016–2017)
- Khidki (2016)
- Krishna Kanhaiya (2015)
- Lapataganj (2009–2014)
- Lo Ho Gayi Pooja Iss Ghar Ki (2008–2009)
- Maddam Sir (2020–2023)
- Main Kab Saas Banoongi (2008–2009)
- Malegaon Ka Chintu (2011–2014)
- Mangalam Dangalam (2018–2019)
- Maniben.com (2009–2010)
- Masti (2005)
- Mohalla Mohabbat Wala (2008)
- Mrs. & Mr. Sharma Allahabadwale (2010–2011)
- Mrs. Tendulkar (2011)
- My Name Ijj Lakhan (2019)
- Namune (2018)
- Office Office (2001–2004)
- Papad Pol (2010–2011)
- Partners Trouble Ho Gayi Double (2017–2018)
- Peterson Hill (2015)
- Platform No. 9 (2005)
- Police Factory (2015–2016)
- Pritam Pyare Aur Woh (2014)
- Public Hai Sab Janti Hai (2003)
- Raamkhilavaan (CM) 'n' Family (2002–2003)
- Ring Wrong Ring (2010–2011)
- R. K. Laxman Ki Duniya (2011–2013)
- Rumm Pumm Po (2015)
- Saat Phero Ki Hera Pherie (2018)
- Sab Ka Bheja Fry (2007)
- Sab Kuch Ho Sakta Hai (2005–2006)
- Sabse Bada Rupaiya (2005)
- Saheb Biwi Aur Boss (2015–2016)
- Sahib Biwi Ka Ghulam (2003)
- Sajan Re Jhoot Mat Bolo (2009–2012)
- Sajan Re Phir Jhoot Mat Bolo (2017–2018)
- Sajan Tum Jhuth Mat Bollo! (2002)
- Shankar Jaikishan 3 in 1 (2017)
- Shree Adi Manav (2009)
- Shrimaan Shrimati Phir Se (2018)
- Shree Sifarishilal (2003–2004)
- Sonu Sweety (2008–2009)
- Super Sisters – Chalega Pyar Ka Jaadu (2018)
- Tera Kya Hoga Alia (2019–2020)
- Tera Yaar Hoon Main (2020–2022)
- Thank You Jijaji (2009)
- Tota Weds Maina (2013)
- Trideviyaan (2016–2017)
- Tu Mere Agal Bagal Hai (2014)
- TV, Biwi aur Main (2017)
- Waqt Hamara Hai (2008)
- Wagle Ki Duniya – Nayi Peedhi Naye Kissey (2021–2025)
- Woh Teri Bhabhi Hai Pagle (2016)
- Yam Hain Hum (2014–2016)
- Yeh Chanda Kanoon Hai (2009–2010)
- Yes Boss (1999–2009)
- Zabaan Sambhalke (2003–2004)

=== Drama series ===
- Aangan – Aapno Kaa (2023–2024)
- Apni Khushian Apne Gham (2001)
- Badall Pe Paon Hai (2024)
- Bhanwar (1999)
- Colonell (2002)
- Dial 100 (2001)
- Dil Diyaan Gallaan (2022–2023)
- Doli Leke Ayee Hai (2002–2004)
- Dulhan (2004)
- Four (2007)
- Galati Kiski (2003)
- Hui Gumm Yaadein Ek Doctor, Do Zindagiyaan (2026)
- Itti Si Khushi (2025–2026)
- Jersey No. 10 (2007–2008)
- Ji Bhenji (2006)
- Karam (2001)
- Left Right Left (2006–2008)
- Love Story (2007–2008)
- Love Mein Kabhi Kabhi (2001–2002)
- Pashminna – Dhaage Mohabbat Ke (2023–2024)
- Sab Satrangi (2022)
- Sambandh (2001)
- Search (2002)
- Shubh Laabh – Aapkey Ghar Mein (2021–2022)
- Tenali Rama (2017–2020, 2024–2025)
- Twinkle Beauty Parlour Lajpat Nagar (2006)
- Ufff..Yeh Love Hai Mushkil (2025)
- Vanshaj (2023–2024)
- Ziddi Dil Maane Na (2021–2022)

=== Fantasy series ===
- Aladdin – Naam Toh Suna Hoga (2018–2021)
- Alif Laila (2001–2002)
- Ali Baba (2022–2023)
- Baalveer (2012–2023)
- Dhruv Tara – Samay Sadi Se Pare (2023–2024)
- Hero – Gayab Mode On (2020–2021)
- Ichhapyaari Naagin (2016–2017)
- Y.A.R.O Ka Tashan (2016–2017)

=== Mythological series ===
- Dharm Yoddha Garud (2022)
- Ganesh Kartikey (2025–2026)
- Jai Shri Swaminarayan (2002)
- Sati Savitri (2001)
- Satyavadi Raja Harishchandra (2001)
- Shrimad Ramayan (2024–2025)
- Veer Hanuman (2025)

=== Reality/non-scripted programming ===
- Acting Ki Funshaala (2008)
- Carryy on Shekhar (2003–2004)
- Comedy Ka King Kaun (2008)
- Comedy Superstar (2015)
- Fame X (2006–2007)
- Family Antakshri Baithe Baithe Kya Kare (2014)
- Good Night India (2022)
- India Ke Mast Kalandar (2018)
- Kuch... Diiil Se (2003)
- Kuch Smiles Ho Jayein... With Alia (2020)
- Lo Kal Lo Baat (2005–2006)
- Movers & Shakers (2012)
- Mr. Aur Mrs. Verma Ki Rasoi (2003)
- Rukawat Ke Liye Khed Hai (2015)
- Sab Ka Sapna Money Money (2015)
- Sab Khelo Sab Jeeto (2013–2014)
- Sab Kuch Ho Sakta Hai (2004)
- Safar Filmy Comedy Ka (2013)
- Say Na Something Anupam Uncle (2000–2004)
- Swayam (2001–2002)
- Tedhi Baat Shekhar Ke Saath (2009)
- Wah Wah (2008)
- Wah! Wah! Kya Baat Hai! (2012–2013)
- Zimmedar Kaun? (2008)

=== Hindi dubbed shows ===
- Alias (2008)
- America's Funniest Home Videos (2008)
- Desperate Housewives (2008)
- Eken Babu (2025)
- Extreme Makeover (2008)
- Home Improvement (2008)
- Lost (2008)
- My Wife and Kids (2008)
- Watchdog (2008)

==== Animated series ====
- Asterix the Gaul (2001–2002)
- Turtle Island (2001–2002)
