= Kaveri Priyam =

Indian television actress

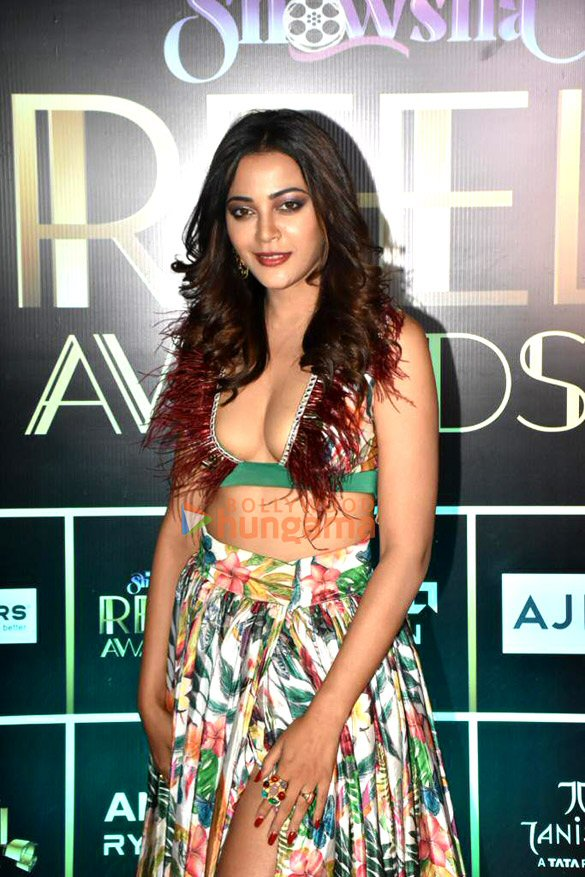
- Priyam in 2023
- Born: 22 October; Bokaro, Bihar, India (present day, Jharkhand, India)
- Education: Vellore Institute of Technology, Vellore
- Occupation: Actress
- Years active: 2017–present
- Known for: Yeh Rishtey Hain Pyaar Ke; Ziddi Dil Maane Na; Dil Diyaan Gallaan; Ghum Hai Kisikey Pyaar Meiin

Kaveri Priyam (born 22 October) is an Indian actress who primarily works in Hindi television. She is best known for her portrayals of Kuhu Maheshwari Rajvansh in Yeh Rishtey Hain Pyaar Ke and Dr. Monami Mahajan in Ziddi Dil Maane Na. She was last seen as Amrita in Dil Diyaan Gallan.

== Early life ==
Kaveri Priyam was born on 22 October in Bokaro, Jharkhand. She did her schooling from Bokaro's St. Xavier School and graduated from Vellore Institute of Technology, Vellore. After completing her studies, she came to Mumbai and started her career as a model by doing print shoots and advertisements. She has a younger brother, Ritesh Anand with whom she runs a restaurant Konkan Chilly in Mumbai.

== Career ==
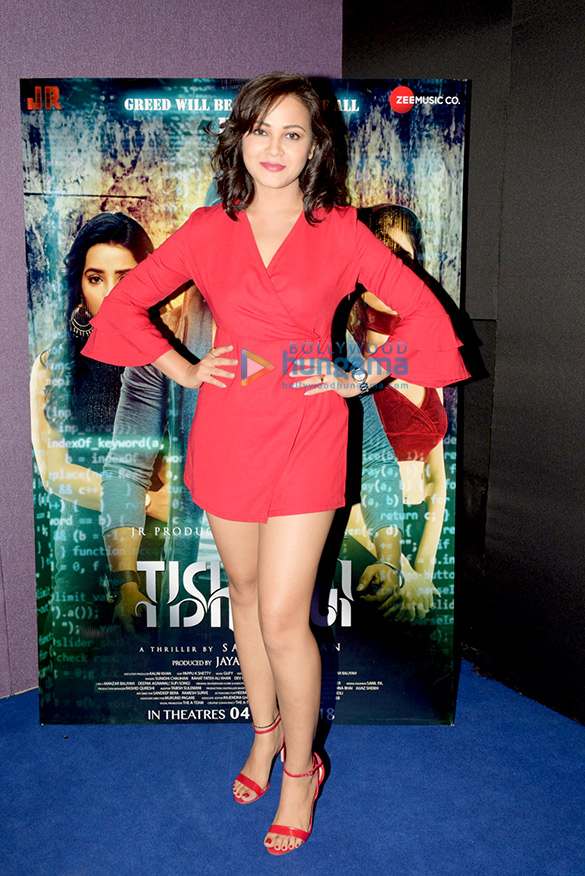
Priyam at the launch of film Tishnagi

Priyam debuted with Naagin 2 as Bee. She then appeared in Pardes Mein Hai Mera Dill and in Savdhaan India. She made her film debut with Tishnagi in 2018.

Priyam joined Yeh Rishtey Hain Pyaar Ke in 2019 as Kuhu Maheshwari Rajvansh opposite Ritvik Arora and Avinash Mishra, which proved to be her breakthrough role. Simultaneously, she also appeared in Shahi's another production, a romantic drama series Yeh Rishta Kya Kehlata Hai, for its integration episodes in March 2019 as Kuhu.

In 2021, Priyam was seen as Dr. Monami Mahajan in Ziddi Dil Maane Na opposite Shaleen Malhotra which ended on 4 June 2022. She played Amrita Brar Dungarpal in Dil Diyaan Gallan opposite Paras Arora from December 2022 to September 2023.

== Filmography ==
=== Films ===
Year	Title	Role	Ref.
2018	Tishnagi	Divya	
2018	Saheb, Biwi Aur Gangster 3	—N/a	
2023	Vash: Possessed by the Obsessed	Pooja	

=== Television ===
Year	Title	Role	Ref.
2017	Naagin 2	Madhu Makkhi	
2017	Pardes Mein Hai Mera Dil	—N/a	
2017	Savdhaan India	—N/a	
2019	Yeh Rishta Kya Kehlata Hai	Kuhu Maheshwari Rajvansh	
2019–2020	Yeh Rishtey Hain Pyaar Ke	Kuhu Maheshwari Rajvansh	
2021–2022	Ziddi Dil Maane Na	Dr. Monami "Monu" Mahajan	
2021	Shakti - Astitva Ke Ehsaas Ki	Dr. Isha Talwar	
2021	Maddam Sir	Dr. Monami "Monu/Mo" Mahajan	
2021	Wagle Ki Duniya – Nayi Peedhi Naye Kissey	Dr. Monami "Monu/Mo" Mahajan	
2022–2023	Dil Diyaan Gallaan	Amrita "Amu" Brar Dungarpal	
2024	Madness Machayenge – India Ko Hasayenge	Herself	
2024–2025	Ghum Hai Kisikey Pyaar Meiin	Ashika "Ash" Solanki	

=== Music videos ===
Year	Title	Singer	Ref.
2022	Yaad Karoge	Sandeep Jaiswal	

== Awards ==
Year	Award	Category	Work	Result	Ref.
2020	Lions Gold Awards	Best Supporting Actress	Yeh Rishtey Hain Pyaar Ke	Won	

== See also ==
- List of Indian television actresses
- List of Hindi television actresses
