= Sanya (TV series) =

- Starring: Rozzlin Pereira; Simple Kaul
- Opening theme: "Sanya..."
- Ending theme: "What to Do" by Rozzlin Pereira
- Country of origin: India
- Original language: Hindi
- No. of episodes: 65

Production
- Executive producers: Zarina Mehta; Ronnie Screwvala
- Running time: 24-30 minutes
- Production company: UTV Software Communications

Original release
- Network: Hungama TV
- Release: 12 December 2005 – 10 March 2006

Sanya is an Indian television teen sitcom which aired on Hungama TV from 12 December 2005 to 10 March 2006.

== Synopsis ==
The show is about Sanya, the girl who just cannot say "No". She is the friend to everyone in need, the most popular girl on the campus of Clarence College. Everyone except Tanyashree (Tiger) wants to be her friend. But with all those qualities she is the most indecisive person on Earth. She always needs help with solving problems. Each episode ends with Sanya asking viewers what to do, facing them with a problem that has two solutions - one selfish and the other selfless. She usually decides to be selfless and help her friends.

The show also revolves around Sanya's friends in college: Tanaaz, Shefu, Jimmy, Mihir. She is also close to her brother and parents. All in all, she is the girl-next-door with a difference.

== Cast and characters ==
- Rozzlin Pereira as Sanya Rai

The girl-next-door who just cannot say no! A role model for everyone and everyone's friend when they are in need. Everyone wants to be like her and wants to be her. She is extremely sweet, simple, down to earth, kind and helpful.

- Malhar Dutt and Minisha Lakdawala as Mr. Girish Rai & Mrs. Priti Rai

Sanya's mother and father are extremely nice, open and friendly. Sanya has a great relationship with her parents. Her father works and her mother stays at home usually.

- Rashi Antani as Shefali (Shefu)

Sanya's best friend who is very simple. She is A typical Gujarati girl, and often mixes her languages, and does not understand jokes. She is very conservative and simple.

- Pushtie Shakti as Tanaaz Gupta

Sanya's best friend in the whole world. She is slightly overweight, very open, fun-filled and flirts with boys. She has many 'BFTFs'(Boy Friends Turned Friends).

- Shaheer Sheikh as Arjun Shekhawat

Arjun works for Sanya's father and comes home every day. He is very well settled and comfortable with Sanya's family and he has a big crush on Sanya but never tells. At last, Arjun proposes Sanya.

- Mayur Kulkarni as Mihir Kapadia

He is the boy who flirts with every girl in college. He is very cool, but he makes a total fool of himself and always tries to impress Sanya, the only one who doesn't fall for him.

- Rajan Mhatre as Jimmy Joshi

Sanya's friend who is obsessed with gadgets. He often gets involved in the odd situations of his friends.

- Rohan Sharma as Rahul Rai

Sanya's younger brother who is very friendly. He has a pet rat called Bingo and loves to play video games.

- Simple Kaul as Tanyashree Singh Agarwal (Tiger)

Sanya's rival and the cool mean girl in school. She is rude and thinks everything Sanya does is wrong.

- Mrunal Sachdev as Lalita Jaisingh Gupta (Lolo)

The village girl who everyone makes fun of. She is confused, simple and gained admission by seeking the help of Sanya.
