= Wagle Ki Duniya – Nayi Peedhi Naye Kissey =

Indian sitcom (2021)

- Created by: Jamnadas Majethia; Aatish Kapadia
- Directed by: Aatish Kapadia; Sameer Kulkarni
- Starring: Sumeet Raghavan; Pariva Pranati; Anjan Srivastav; Bharati Achrekar; Chinmayee Salvi; Sheehan Kapahi
- Country of origin: India
- Original language: Hindi
- No. of episodes: 1,362

Production
- Producers: Jamnadas Majethia; Aatish Kapadia
- Cinematography: Vijay Soni; Rishi Mudrale; Jitendra Mishra
- Editors: Ashok Rathore; Ajay A Kumar; Atul Singh
- Running time: 21–28 minutes
- Production company: Hats Off Productions Limited

Original release
- Network: Sony SAB; Sony LIV
- Release: 8 February 2021 – 9 August 2025

Related
- Wagle Ki Duniya

Wagle Ki Duniya – Nayi Peedhi Naye Kissey (transl. Wagle's World – New Generation New Stories) is an Indian television sitcom that aired from 8 February 2021 to 9 August 2025 on Sony SAB. It is based on characters created by cartoonist R. K. Laxman, especially The Common Man, and about the everyday issues experienced by the average middle-class Indian man. A sequel to Wagle Ki Duniya, which aired on Doordarshan.

== Plot ==
The show is based around the daily struggles of a courier company manager, Rajesh Wagle, who lives with the prudence of a middle-class person of the time. The show presents the everyday struggles of people from three generations and multiple families from their perspectives acting like members of a single family. They try to clear the struggles between everyone, acting like a whole. The show gives a social message in most of its episodes through humor and emotions.

== Cast ==
=== Main ===
- Sumeet Raghavan as Rajesh "Raju/Raj" Wagle: Manager of a courier service company. (2021–2025)
- Pariva Pranati as Vandana "Vandu" Sinha Wagle: Rajesh's wife. (2021–2025)
- Anjan Srivastav as Srinivas Wagle: Radhika's husband. (2021–2025)
- Bharati Achrekar as Radhika Gokhale Wagle: Srinivas's wife. (2021–2025)
  - Achrekar also portrayed Ruby Gokhale, Radhika’s twin sister. (2022)
- Chinmayee Salvi as Sakhi Wagle: Rajesh and Vandana's daughter; Vivan's best friend and girlfriend. (2021–2025)
- Sheehan Kapahi as Atharva Wagle: Rajesh and Vandana's son. (2021–2025)

=== Recurring ===
- Amit Soni as Harshad Agrawal – Wagle Family's closest neighbours, Rajesh's close friend. (2021–2025)
- Bhakti Chauhan as Jyoti Gupta Agrawal – Harshad's wife; Gungun and Vidyut's mother. (2021–2025)
- Deepak Pareek as Advocate Dakshesh "Dakku" Joshipura – The stubborn secretary of Sai Darshan Heights Society. (2021–2025)
- Manasi Joshi / Riddhi Nayak as Yamini "Yam" Joshipura – Naivedya's sister. (2021–2025) / (2025)
- Vipul Deshpande as Manoj Wagle – Srinivas and Radhika's elder son. (2023–2025)
- Sukanya Surve as Vidya Kulkarni Wagle - Mr. Kulkarni's daughter. (2023–2025)
  - Afreen Shaikh as young Vidya (2023)
- Charmi Dhami / Prapti Shukla / Nandini Maurya as Gungun Agrawal – Jyoti and Harshad's daughter. (2021) / (2021–2023) / (2023–2025)
- Hitanshu Nagia as Vidyut Agrawal – Jyoti and Harshad's son. (2021–2025)
- Mahi Soni as Kittu Joshipura – Meenakshi's daughter; Yamini and Dakshesh's adopted daughter. (2022–2025)
- Namit Shah as Vivaan Malhotra – Sakhi's best friend later boyfriend. (2021–2025).
- Suryakant Govale as Chandu Parab – A staff member in Rajesh's courier office. (2021–2025)
- Nayan Shukla as Ghanshyam Dasani – A staff member in Rajesh's courier office. (2021–2025)
- Anju Jadhav as Kiara Tejwani – The CEO of the courier service P2P Max. (2021–2025)
- Vinayak Ketkar as Manish Marfatia – Ex Hotel manager of Treat Resort in Silvassa, now a staff member at Rajesh's courier office. (2021–2025)
- Urmila Katkar as Asha Tipnis – Sai Darshan Heights Society's maid; Dilip's wife. (2021–2025)
- Satyavrat Mudgal as Ganpat Rao Tiwari – Sai Darshan Heights Society's watchman. (2021–2025).
- Khushali Jariwala as Munmun Chatterjee – Catering manager at Treat Resort. (2021)
- Praful Joshi as Dilip Tipnis – Asha's husband; Komal's father (2021-2025)
- Dhwani Hetal Parmar as Komal Tipnis – Asha and Dilip's daughter (2021-2025)
- Amit Verma as Nikesh "Nick" Agarwal – Harshad's cousin.(2022–2024)
- Preeti Kochar as Mahadevi Tripathi – Vandana's aunt (Maami). (2022-2024)
- Riya Soni as Anvita Jain – Vivaan's ex-girlfriend; Sakhi's college friend. (2021–2025)
- Sushant Kalyan Singh as Shikhar Patel – Gungun's boyfriend (2021–2025)
- Nabil Parkar as Soumil Ahuja – Sakhi and Gungun's college friend. (2021–2022)
- Ambar Bedi as Maya Ahlawat – Vandana's college friend, Rajesh's rival and P2P Glocal Packers staff member. (2021–2022)
- Vikas Grover as Harish "Harry" Khatri – He was the owner of the courier service P2P Glocal. (2022-2024)
- Prabhackar Sinha as Arjun Swaroop – A hotel staff and junior to Mr. Marfatia at Treat Resort. (2021)
- Suhail Iqbal as Mr. Tejwani – Rajesh's previous boss and Kiara's father. (2021)
- Nayana Apte Joshi as Kishori – Radhika's best friend (2021–2025)
- Tulika Patel as Trupti Ahuja – Harshad's ex-girlfriend; Soumil's aunt (2021-2022).
- Akshay Sharma as Tushar Dalvi - Atharva and Vidyut's classmate (2023)
- Milky Srivastav / Simmi Ghoshal as Khushi Tarachand – Atharva and Vidyut's classmate (2022–2024) / (2024–2025)
- Amit Munjal as Walia; Resident of Sai darshan heights society. (2023-2025)
- Arya Mahajan as Mangesh - Vidya and Damodar's son. (2023-2025)
- Bhoomi Shah as Aditi Sathe - Atharva's classmate in college, who has a crush on Atharva (2024-2025)
- Araham Sawant as Abhimanyu Malhotra - Atharva's classmate and college rival.(2024-2025)
- Saumya Shetye as Ananya - Atharva's classmate in college and crush.(2024-2025)
- Zain Nabil as Karen - Sakhi's foreign exchange best friend from Germany (2023-2024)
- Vinay Rohrra as Karan Thappar - Sakhi's professor (2023-2024)
- Keshav Aswani as Sushant – Sakhi's kidnapper and one sided lover (2025)
- Tarjanee Bhadla as Santoori "Santu" Dave - Dharmesh's wife; Vandana's friend (2024-2025)
- Khanjan Thumber as Dharmesh Dave - Santoori's husband (2024-2025)
- Vyom Thakkar as Krishna Dave - Dharmesh and Santoori's younger son (2024-2025)
- Dutt Patel as Aditya "Adi" Dave - Dharmesh and Santoori's elder son (2025)

=== Guest appearances ===
- Nimisha Vakharia as Rekha Gondhalekar – Radhika's old maid; She won a lottery of ₹50 million, and became immensely rich after leaving Radhika's place(2021)
- Deven Bhojani as Balkrishna 'Anna' Gokhale from Bhakharwadi – Radhika and Ruby's elder brother who was on non-talking terms with Srinivas for 18 years. He was against the love marriage of Rajesh and Vandana. Srinivas broke his relationship with him. But later, Anna realises that Vandana is a perfect wife. He reties his bonds with Srinivas and thus, things get sorted.(2021)
- Manas Shah as Randeep Walia – Popular TV actor; Priya's brother. He came to Treat Resort for shooting. His sister, Dr. Priya Walia was a look-alike of Sakhi and died due to COVID-19. (2021)
- Amita Khopkar as Mrs. Walia – Priya and Randeep's mother.(2021)
- Ojas Rawal as Naivedya Mehta – Yamini's brother. He is the owner of Treat Resort, situated in Silvassa. He makes fun of Dakshesh and all the Sai Darshan Heights residents. He only cares about his sister. He teasingly calls Dakshesh as 'Mendakshesh'.(2021-2025)
- Kalpesh Chauhan as Gulaabdas Rawal – Co-owner of Treat Resort.(2021)
- Apurva Gore as Aashka – Nishant's wife. She and her fiancé, Nishant got married at Treat Resort amidst lockdown restrictions.(2021)
- Vivek Kaul as Nishant – Aashka's husband. He and his fiancée, Aashka got married at Treat Resort amidst lockdown restrictions.(2021)
- Bakhtiyaar Irani as Jamie Paul – A professional photographer who molests Sakhi in the name of making her a famous model. (2023)
- Abhishek Avasthi as Dr Ravi "Rinku" Sinha – Vandana's cousin; Raghu's father. He is a farmer and is irritated by Atharva for the same. However, Atharva reconciles with him learning his past. Later, He is revealed to be a reputed agricultural scientist. (2022)
- Madhura Joshi as Archana Wagle Chinoy – Prabhakar's daughter; Rajesh's cousin; Vivek's wife. She is Rajesh's cousin from Nashik who came to Mumbai to get married after her mother-in-law's illness. Later with Sakhi's help, she and Vivek tried to flee from the wedding to get married after knowing about the true shades of her greedy father-in-law who secretly pressurizes her father for dowry. (2022)
- Rahul Krishna Arora as Vivek Chinoy – Janardhan and Sukanya's son; Archana's husband. (2022)
- Arvind Wahi as Janardhan Chinoy – Sukanya's husband; Vivek's father. He is a greedy person who secretly pressurized Prabhakar for dowry and have Archana and Vivek's marriage in Mumbai. (2022)
- Chaitali Jadhav as Sukanya Chinoy – Janardhan's wife; Vivek's mother. She stood up against her husband and helped Archana and Vivek. (2022)
- Ajji as Kalyani Mausi – She is Rajesh's distant aunt from Radhika's village, who is very conventional in her thinking and always taunts innovative thinking when she visits Sai Darshan Heights society.(2021-2022)
- Vinay Yedekar as Ashwin Chitre – Rajesh's best friend who established a business in Dubai and hadn't talked to him for years.(2021)
- Simran Khanna as
  - Monica Palekar / Sukanya Palekar – Sudhir's daughter; Rajesh's childhood friend. She was a fat girl and was inspired to loss weight after Rajesh once taunted her in his childhood.(2021)
  - Sarika Saxena – Priyanka's mother (2024)
- Utpal Dashora as Suryakant Bhosle – Rajesh's friend who followed his passion and became a famous painter. Now settled in France.(2022)
- Payal Sharma as Niyati – Director of Dishwasher's ad, for which she selected Radhika and Vandana.(2021)
- Karan Grover as Arnav Sachdev – He starred with Vandana and Radhika in an advertisement.(2021)
- Devendra Mishra as Inspector M. Tripathi.
- Aditi Sanwal as Dr. Prabha Shah – Gungun's doctor. She is a widowed mother of a six-year-old boy as she lost her husband due to COVID-19. She attempts suicide due to death threats on social media following a post by Harshad Agrawal owing to a misunderstanding.(2022)
- Adaa Khan as Sakhi Warge: Sakhi's friend and dancer teacher. (2023)
- Neha Dandale as ACP/DCP Tejaswi Deshpande (2023)
- Dimple Kava as Alka, a psychiatrist (2024)
- Karan Sharma as Pulkit Sharma: Riya's ex-husband turned friend (2023)
- Priyanka Goswami as Priyanka Saxena – Sarika's daughter; Sakhi's college friend (2024)
- Bharti Singh as Ira – Sakhi's college friend (2024)
- Tasneem Ali as Justice Nirmala Sharma (2024)
- Rakhi Sawant as Begum Chorni
- Ketan Singh as Badshah Chor
- Vansh Sayani as Kushal Joshi - Atharva's friend who aspires to become a chef (2024)
- Tunisha Sharma as Inspector Aditi Jammwal from Hero – Gayab Mode On
- Gulki Joshi as Inspector Haseena Malik from Maddam Sir. She appeared in episode 291 to explain the importance of safety of girls in the society.
- Simple Kaul as Koyal Roy – Cadet of Parakram SAF from Ziddi Dil Maane Na.
- Nirbhay Thakur as Nikhil Roy – Koyal's son from Ziddi Dil Maane Na.
- Karan Veer Mehra as Abhay – Koyal's husband from Ziddi Dil Maane Na.
- Shaleen Malhotra as Special Agent Karan Shergill from Ziddi Dil Maane Na.
- Kaveri Priyam as Dr. Monami Mahajan – Cadet of Parakram SAF and Koyal's friend from Ziddi Dil Maane Na.
- Karuna Pandey as Pushpa Patel from Pushpa Impossible.
- Amit Pachori as Colonel Ashish Singh - Rajesh's childhood friend (2024)
- Faisal Khan as Abhay Bansal: Sakhi's stalker. (2024)
- Rashami Desai as Advocate Meenakshi Kapoor: Kittu's mother (2025)
- Sudhanshu Pandey as Rakesh Diwan (Rocky D): Vandana 's college friend and A Superstar Singer (2025)
- Paresh Ganatra as Himanshu, Deepanshu and Dr. Sudhanshu: Jyoti's brothers who are triplets (2025)
- Sugandha Mishra as Suman: A actress (2025)
- Amit Dolawat as A cid officer (2025)
- Sandeep Anand as Sajan Gupta: A detective (2025)

== Production ==
The show is produced by Jamnadas Majethia and Aatish Kapadia of Hats Off Productions. The show was first teased featuring Sumeet Raghavan on Sony SAB's official YouTube channel on 5 December 2020. The show has been given a special COVID-19 touch.

The shooting of the show was halted in April 2021 after eight people reportedly tested positive for COVID-19. Fresh episodes started airing on 26 April, with episodes being shot in Silvassa. Towards the end of June, shooting restarted in Mumbai.

== Crossover ==
In August 2021, Deven Bhojani was cast, reprising his role of Anna from Sony SAB's show Bhakarwadi.

The Big Shanivaar is crossover of all Sony SAB's on-going shows (except Taarak Mehta Ka Ooltah Chashmah) on 9 October 2021 to promote Sony SAB telecasting their shows on Saturday also.

The Big Shanivaar is crossover of all Sony SAB's on-going shows (except Taarak Mehta Ka Ooltah Chashmah) on 20 November 2021 on the occasion of Diwali in Parakram SAF and to help its Cadet Koel Roy in escaping from her husband.

Wagle Ki Duniya had multiple crossover with Pushpa Impossible from 12 September 2022 to 13 September 2022, on 1 July 2023, on 9 and 14 September 2024, and on 17 and 19 October 2024.

From 15 to 19 October 2024, Gulki Joshi who played role of Haseena Malik in Maddam Sir appeared in Wagle Ki Duniya.

== Awards and nominations ==
Year	Award	Category	Nominee	Result	Ref.
2022	Indian Television Academy Awards	Popular Show - Comedy	Wagle Ki Duniya – Nayi Peedhi Naye Kissey	Won	
2022	Indian Television Academy Awards	Popular Actor - Comedy	Aanjjan Srivastav	Nominated	
2022	Indian Television Academy Awards	Popular Actor - Comedy	Sumeet Raghavan	Nominated	
2022	Indian Television Academy Awards	Popular Actor - Comedy	Sheehan Kapahi	Nominated	
2022	Indian Television Academy Awards	Popular Actress - Comedy	Bharati Achrekar	Nominated	
2022	Indian Television Academy Awards	Popular Actress - Comedy	Pariva Pranati	Won	
2022	Indian Television Academy Awards	Popular Actress - Comedy	Chinmayee Salvi	Nominated	
2022	Indian Television Academy Awards	Best Director - Comedy	Jamnadas Majethia and Sameer Kulkarni	Won	
2022	Indian Television Academy Awards	Best Actor - Comedy	Sumeet Raghvan	Won	
2023	Indian Telly Awards	Best Actor in a Lead Role	Sumeet Raghvan	Won	
2023	Indian Telly Awards	Best Casting Director Award	Kuldeep Singh Chauhan	Won	
2023	Indian Telly Awards	Best Programme with a Social Message Award	Wagle Ki Duniya – Nayi Peedhi Naye Kissey	Won	
2023	Indian Telly Awards	Best Actor in a Supporting Role Award	Aanjjan Srivastav	Won	
2023	Indian Telly Awards	Best Ensemble Cast Award	Wagle Ki Duniya – Nayi Peedhi Naye Kissey	Won	
2023	Indian Telly Awards	Fan Favourite Child Artist	Sheehan Kapahi	Nominated	
