= Ziddi Dil Maane Na =

Indian youth drama (2021)

- Genre: Drama
- Created by: Seema Sahani Sharma; Sudhir Sharma
- Screenplay by: Nishikant Roy; Ira Arya
- Story by: Shivani Shah
- Directed by: Amit D Malik
- Creative director: Mani Dixit
- Starring: See below
- Theme music composer: Shalin Sharma
- Opening theme: Dil Ziddi Hai
- Ending theme: Dil Ziddi Hai
- Composer: Divya Limbasia
- Country of origin: India
- Original language: Hindi
- No. of seasons: 1
- No. of episodes: 233

Production
- Camera setup: Multi-camera
- Running time: 23-28 minutes
- Production company: Sunshine Productions

Original release
- Network: Sony SAB
- Release: 30 August 2021 – 4 June 2022

Ziddi Dil Maane Na (transl. The Stubborn Heart Doesn't Agree) is an Indian Hindi-language youth-based television drama series that aired on Sony SAB. It stars Shaleen Malhotra, Kaveri Priyam, Kunal Karan Kapoor, Diljot Kaur Chhabra, Aditya Deshmukh and Simple Kaul. The plot revolves around a young Special Action Force (SAF) team who find love while fulfilling their aspirations at the camp. The show is made under the banner of Sunshine Productions. It premiered on 30 August 2021 and ended on 4 June 2022.

== Plot ==
Colonel Pushpendra Batra, founder of Parakram SAF Academy, comes out of retirement and starts a civil training program due to increased terrorist activities. He promises the minister that if he fails in his mission he will return all his medals to the ministry. He chooses his three best special agents to carry out this program: Special Agent Karan Shergill, Special Agent Sanjana Dubey and Special Agent Faizuddin Siddiqui.

Dr. Monami Mahajan (Monu) is kind-hearted and helpful by nature and has decided to join the training against her father's wishes. She has a misunderstanding with Karan before joining the academy. Her best friend is Siddharth Ganju, arrives at the academy and claims to be her fiancée. She denies it but as Sanjana beats him, she accepts it. Siddharth claims to have a rare heart disease and Mrs. Batra throws an engagement party for Siddharth and Monami. Siddharth likes Sanjana but Sanjana rejects him and his gifts as she is already engaged but fails to mention it. After a few more issues, Siddharth is mistreated of Karan an after a while, thrown out of the academy. Around the same time, Monami stumbles upon an organ trafficking ring and while trying to stop this ring, the cadets, Special Agents and Siddharth start understanding each other. After stopping the ring, Siddharth is also given admission into the SAF Academy.

After a few more incidents, including helping Koel expose her abusive husband, Monami falls in love with Karan while Siddharth and Sanjana also become close. Karan does not reciprocate any feelings for Moani because of his past trauma and once Monami eventually learns about Karan's past, decides to let go of her feeling for Karan. In a twist of events, Karan realizes that he is in love with Monami but before he can express his feeling, Sanjana's regressive fiancé Kundan and Siddharth and Monami's good friend Dr. Aneesh who loves Monami from their college days arrive at the academy. Siddharth is heartbroken upon learning about Kundan and Sanjana and after some contemplation, realises that Sanjana also likes him reaches her village to stop wedding and on the other hand, seeing the camaraderie between Dr. Anees and Monami, Karan becomes jealous and insecure. After a few incidents, Karan and Monami confesses their love to each other.

Around the same time, Siddharth realises that Kundan helps run a women trafficking ring and informs this to Sanju and she does not believe him. During the wedding events, Kundan realises the truth about Siddharth and Sanjana, kidnaps him and vows to make sure the marriage not happen. Sanjana tries to rescue Siddharth and during this process get caught by KD, Kundan's boss and Siddharth gets injured. Karan and Monami find Siddharth, and with the help of Koel and other SAF members rescue Sanjana and the other girls and get Kundan and KD arrested.

Dhanu and Charu, the leaders of an extremist organization, find Karan's look-alike Balli, a truck driver and plan to disguise him as Karan and send him to the academy in his place. Karan shoots Dhanu during a fight causing her to slip into a coma but gets kidnapped by Charu after meeting an accident due to Balli. Balli swaps places with Karan while Monami grows anxious for Karan's safety. Balli's activities makes Monami and others suspicious of him. Their doubts are confirmed after Balli inappropriately touches Monami while Karan kills Dhanu. Batra Sir gives Monami, Faizi and Sanjana two days to find Karan and they start to implement their plan. Karan notices another prisoner captured by Charu and team, who turns out be Param, his brother. Balli betrays Charu which angers her. Monami, Faizi and Sanjana go to rescue Karan with the help of Balli. Charu plants a bomb in Karan's cell which blasts as Balli opens the door. Karan dies in Monami's arms. Monami is shattered upon losing her love and vows vengeance. Batra and team decide to use Balli after he informs them about Charu's misunderstanding and her plan. Monami gets emotional during her birthday celebration and misses Karan while Sanju, Faizi, Ustad Ji and Batra sir support her. Monami has a hard time seeing Balli getting the love and respect Karan used to get.

The terrorist organization plans an attack on CM when he visits Parakram SAF. Monami learns about Param being alive and informs Col. Batra. They rescue Param and it is revealed to the cadets that Karan is dead while Charu and team are caught. They give him a tribute. Everyone in the academy forgive Balli after he saves their lives except Monami. Param behaves strangely with everyone including Baby and Barkha, which makes Balli suspicious and he discovers that the head of PRF is Param himself, after which he decides to join as a cadet to expose Param. Monami too doubts Param and informs Balli about it. Karan is revealed to be alive and is working undercover to gather evidence against Param. Monami discovers the same and the duo share an emotional and romantic time together. Karan informs Monami about what happened to him and replaces Balli in the academy to trick Param with the help of Monami and Balli. First Siddharth and then Faizi learn that Karan is alive. Later Koel proposes marriage to Faizi and he happily agrees. Eventually, everybody discovers that Karan is alive and that Param is the Head of PRF. All of the cadets and trainers decide to expose him at Karan's birthday event and after a confrontation, Param is arrested.

A year later, Monami becomes a special agent and is the new head trainer of Parakram SAF. Karan is the academy head. Balli runs an NGO to help orphans using the money given by Charu and PRF. Sumanji is a karate teacher who runs a karate school for girls. Chitra and Bala are together. Koel, Faizi, and Nikhil are a family and Koel is an agent. Siddharth is also an agent and Sanjana is the academy head of Parakram SAF Bundelkhand. Monami and Karan invite everyone to their marriage party. They have a reunion while Monami and Karan share a romantic dance. Baby and Nikhil recite the academy's anthem and decide to be commandos as well.

== Cast ==
=== Main ===
- Shaleen Malhotra as special Agent Major Karan Shergill:
  - Param's brother, Barkha's brother-in-law, Soumya's uncle and best friend, Faizi's best friend, ustad ji and sanjana's karan sirji, parakram SAF head trainer later turned into academy head, Monami's husband, Anish seen him as rival, dhanu and charu's (PRF) rival (2021–2022)
    - Balli: A Punjabi truck driver, Karan's lookalike, best friend of shanty (2022)
- Kaveri Priyam as Dr. Monami Mahajan:
  - Deepak and Juhi's daughter, Siddharth childhood friend, former cadet at Parakram SAF, Aneesh's college friend, Karan's wife. She later becomes the head trainer after passing out her training. (2021–2022)
- Kunal Karan Kapoor as Siddharth Ganju aka Sid G :
  - Bodhraj's son, Monami's childhood best friend, former cadet at Parakram SAF, Sanjana's boyfriend. He later becomes Head Trainer in Parakram SAF Academy, Bundelkhand branch (2021–2022)
- Diljot Kaur Chhabra as Special Agent Sanjana "Sanju" Dubey:
  - Kundan's ex-fiancée, Siddharth's girlfriend, Head of Parakram SAF Academy, Bundelkhand Branch. (2021–2022)
- Aditya Deshmukh as Special Agent Faizuddin Siddiqui aka Faizi:
  - Karan's childhood best friend, Koel's husband and Nikhil's step-father. (2021–2022)
- Simple Kaul as Koel Roy:
  - Nikhil's mother, Abhay's ex-wife, former cadet at Parakram SAF, later becomes a trainer there, Faizuddin's wife. (2021–2022)

=== Recurring ===
- Abhishek Rawat as Commander and Special Agent Param Shergill: Karan's brother who is assumed a martyr, Barkha's husband, Soumya's father. (2021–2022)
  - Anand Suryavanshi replaced Rawat as Param Shergill (2022)
- Nirbhay Thakur as Nikhil Mehra: Koel and Abhay's biological son, Faizi's step-son who is greatly loved by him. (2021–2022)
- Satyaketi Mishra as Suman Tiwari a.k.a Sumanji: A cadet, Rajesh Tiwari's wife, Koel's rival-turned-friend. After passing out, she opens a karate training academy for girls. (2021–present)
- Nirisha Basnett as Chitra: A cadet, Bala's girlfriend, later wife and a social media fanatic (2021–2022)
- Raju Shrestha as Prem "Premji" Deshpremi: An actor who joins the academy to show his children that he is something more than his TV shows and that he has an identity of his own (2021–2022)
- Prathmesh Sharma as Bala: An ex-pickpocketer who joins the academy due to Karan, a cadet, Chitra's boyfriend, later husband. (2021–2022)
- Subodh Gulati as Banta Singh aka Ustad Ji: A trainer who admire Karan and param (2021–2022)
- Vijay Kashyap as Col. Pushpinder Batra: Director of Parakram SAF and Civilian Training Project (2021–2022)
- Gulfam Khan as Mrs. Batra: Col. Batra's wife.(2021–2022)
- Amarkant Dubey as Dilbag Ji: A cook and in charge of the mess in Parakram SAF (2021–2023)
- Aarzu Soni as Soumya "Baby" Shergill: Param and Barkha's daughter, Karan's niece and best friend (2021–2022)
- Shriya Jha as Barkha Shergill: Param's wife, Soumya's mother, Karan's sister-in-law (2021–2022)
- Varsha Dhagat as Sanjana's mother (2021–2022)
- Manohar Teli as Sanjana's father (2021–2022)
- Himanshu Gokani as Chief Minister (2021–2022)
- Sushant Kandya as Special Agent Ambar Rawat : who hated Karan and Param, he wanted to become head trainer of program so had grudges against karan and try to conspire against karan to suspend him (2021)
- Ashish Kaul as Bodhraj Ganju: Siddharth's father (2021–2022)
- Jiten Lalwani as Dr. Deepak Mahajan: Monami's father, karan's father-in-law who hated karan Juhi's widower, founder and CEO of Mahajan Multispecialty Hospital (2021–2022)
- Kimmy Kaur as Lieutenant General Dr. Gunjan Bhushan: Late Dr. Juhi Mahajan's friend who motivates Monami and gifts her the brooch which Dr. Juhi gifted her. (2021–2022)
- Dinesh Agarwal as Shunty: Balli's best friend (2022–2022)
- Siraj Mustafa Khan as Dhawan: Member of a terrorist organization, right hand of the leader (2022)
- Surbhi Talodiya/Abigail Pande as Charu: Dhanu's younger sister and Kanu's daughter (2022)
- Saajan Malhotra as Rajan: Charu and Dhanu's close associate (2022)
- Darshan Gurjar as Tilli: Dhanu and Charu's close associate who wants to be a commando earlier. He does not identify himself or PRF as terrorists. He later realizes his mistake and leaves them but slips into a coma after being attacked by Param. He later recovers and is hidden by Karan to protect him. (2022)
- Amitt K Singh as Dr. Aneesh Malhotra: A successful doctor who has just returned from U.S.A, Monami's college friend and obsessive one-sided lover, a good poet, newly joined Parakram SAF, Karan's rival who joins hands with Dhanu and Charu to swap Karan and Balli (2021–2022)
- Bhamini Oza Gandhi as Dhanu Pandya aka Pushpa: Leader of PRF Kanu's daughter and Charu's elder sister, Karan's enemy who wants to kill him but is shot by him and slips into coma, later killed by karan (2022)
- Davir Mirza as Jeetu: Karan's informer who is killed by Dhanu (2022) (Dead)
- Angad Hasija as Kundan: Sanjana's orthodox and regressive ex-fiancé, he is involved in human trafficking racket and works under KD (2021–2022)
- Vinay Bhatia as KD: Head of the Women Trafficking Racket, Kundan's boss (2022)
- Simran Choudhary as Kritika: Lakshmi and Sanjana's best friend in Bundelkhand who looks up to Sanjana as her inspiration, she has a liking/crush on Siddharthdharth (2022)
- Deepra Mishra as Lakshmi: Sanjana and Kritika's friend, she is kidnapped by Kundan along with many girls for Women trafficking (2022)
- Maleeka Ghai as Amma Ji: Kundan's mother, a regressive and orthodox lady (2021–2022)
- Karanveer Mehra as Abhay Mehra: Koel's abusive ex-husband who used to beat her, Nikhil's father, a businessman (2021-2022)
- Sohaila Kapur as Mridula Mehra: Abhay's mother; Koel's ex-mother-in-law; Nikhil's grandmother (2022)
- Sushant Kandya as Ambar Rawat (2021)
- Vinit Kakar as Chirag: A contractor, head of the illegal organ trade racket in the City Care Hospital, a psycho (2021)
- Ayushi Khurana as Faizuddin's namesake girlfriend in episode 1 (2021)

=== Guest ===
- Gulki Joshi as S.H.O. Haseena Malik (from Maddam Sir)
- Tunisha Sharma as A.S.P. Aditi Jammwal (from Hero: Gayab Mode On)
- Rakhi Sawant as Begum Chorni
- Ketan Singh as Badshah Chor
- Yukti Kapoor as S.I. Karishma Singh (from Maddam Sir)
- Sumeet Raghavan as Rajesh Wagle (from Wagle Ki Duniya)
- Sheehan Kapahi as Atharva Wagle (from Wagle Ki Duniya)

== Production ==
=== Development ===
The series was announced by Sunshine Productions and was confirmed to be releasing in August 2021 by Sony SAB. Its first promo was launched on 26 July 2021.

=== Casting ===
Shaleen Malhotra and Kaveri Priyam were cast to play the leads. Kunal Karan Kapoor, Diljot Kaur Chhabra, Aditya Deshmukh and Simple Kaul were cast in supporting roles.

== Crossover ==
The Big Shanivaar is crossover of all Sony SAB's on-going shows (except Taarak Mehta Ka Ooltah Chashmah) on 9 October 2021 to promote Sony SAB telecasting their shows on Saturday also.

The Big Shanivaar is crossover of all Sony SAB's on-going shows (except Taarak Mehta Ka Ooltah Chashmah) on 20 November 2021 on the occasion of Diwali in Parakram SAF and to help its Cadet Koel Roy in escaping from her husband.

Shaam Shaandar is the New Year special, a one-hour special episode on 31 December 2021 along with Wagle Ki Duniya – Nayi Peedhi Naye Kissey and Maddam Sir.

== See also ==
- List of programs broadcast by Sony SAB
