= List of Maddam Sir episodes =

Maddam Sir – Kuch Baat Hai Kyunki Jazbaat Hai is an Indian comedy cop television show. The series aired from 24 February 2020 to 18 February 2023 on Sony SAB and digitally streamed on SonyLIV. The characters and the cases add to the fun and humour of the show. The common challenge for all these women is to bring sensitivity to their policing while dealing with cases that come to this police station.

== Episode list ==
No.	Title	Original release date
1	"Inspector Haseena Mallik"	24 February 2020
2	"Karishma’s Plan Backfires"	25 February 2020
3	"Will Haseena Trap Dr Archana?"	26 February 2020
4	"Haseena And The Fake Degree"	27 February 2020
5	"Haseena Reprimands Karishma"	28 February 2020
6	"Haseena Loses Virus Shetty"	2 March 2020
7	"The Car Crash"	3 March 2020
8	"Parvati Seeks Justice"	4 March 2020
9	"Maddam Sir And Samir Go Out On A Date"	5 March 2020
10	"Who Is To Be Blamed?"	6 March 2020
11	"Will Haseena’s Plan Succeed?"	9 March 2022
12	"A Divorce Due To An App?"	10 March 2020
13	"Will Haseena Prove Monty’s App Wrong?"	11 March 2020
14	"Monty’s House is on Fire"	12 March 2020
15	"Protesting Man Disappears"	13 March 2020
16	"Will Haseena Find Pandey Or Resign?"	16 March 2020
17	"Haseena Dares Pammi"	17 March 2020
18	"Karishma Goes Viral on Social Media!"	18 March 2020
19	"Angad Humiliates Karishma"	19 March 2020
20	"Karishma Stops A Suicide Attempt"	20 March 2020
21	"Antara Pretends To Be Dead"	23 March 2020
22	"Vikram Threatens Angad"	24 March 2020
23	"Muscle Over Merit"	13 July 2020
24	"Haseena's Apology"	14 July 2020
25	"Karishma Enters An Ambush"	15 July 2020
26	"Hurdles"	16 July 2020
27	"Haseena's Act"	17 July 2020
28	"Against Each Other"	20 July 2020
29	"Clinic Captives"	21 July 2020
30	"Match Making"	22 July 2020
31	"Wedding Crashers"	23 July 2020
32	"Mock Marriage"	24 July 2020
33	"Mission To Crumble?"	27 July 2020
34	"A Misfired Plan"	28 July 2020
35	"Welcome Misri Pandey"	29 July 2020
36	"A Criminal Escapes"	30 July 2020
37	"Mission Misri's Transfer"	31 July 2020
38	"Misri's Conniving Moves"	3 August 2020
39	"Misri Gets Outwitted"	4 August 2020
40	"The Strange Accountant"	5 August 2020
41	"Nuisance Nabbing"	6 August 2020
42	"Calling It Quits"	7 August 2020
43	"Pushpa's Plight"	10 August 2020
44	"Deadly Duo"	11 August 2020
45	"Taking Eve-Teasers To Task"	12 August 2020
46	"Helpless Haseena"	13 August 2020
47	"The Non-cooperation"	14 August 2020
48	"The Fake Viral Video"	17 August 2020
49	"Inquiry Against Haseena"	18 August 2020
50	"Handling The Situation"	19 August 2020
51	"Maddam Sir's Decision"	20 August 2020
52	"Maddam Sir's Decision"	21 August 2020
53	"The Shocking News"	24 August 2020
54	"Santosh Sharma's Sarcasm"	25 August 2020
55	"The Shayari Night"	26 August 2020
56	"The Shayari Night"	27 August 2020
57	"Haseena is on a mission"	28 August 2020
58	"Iqbal's Return"	31 August 2020
59	"Positive Response"	1 September 2020
60	"Pointing Gun At Baba"	4 September 2020
61	"Karishma Visits The Ashram"	5 September 2020
62	"Baba Rangrasiya's Menace"	6 September 2020
63	"Catching Baba Rangrasiya"	7 September 2020
64	"Ambika's Story"	8 September 2020
65	"Setting A Trap For Aditya"	9 September 2020
66	"Santosh Wants To Help Maddam Sir"	10 September 2020
67	"Santosh's Other Side"	11 September 2020
68	"Maddam Sir’s Duplicate?"	14 September 2020
69	"The Lookalike"	15 September 2020
70	"Billu's Problem"	16 September 2020
71	"Distrust Between Colleagues"	17 September 2020
72	"Pushpa's Restlesness"	18 September 2020
73	"Is Haseena Laying A Trap For Herself?"	21 September 2020
74	"The Secret Tunnel"	22 September 2020
75	"Pushpa's Old Age Policy"	23 September 2020
76	"Karishma Doesn't Understand Haseena"	24 September 2020
77	"The Plan"	25 September 2020
78	"The Kidney Donor"	28 September 2020
79	"The Confusion"	29 September 2020
80	"Is The Thief Caught?"	30 September 2020
81	"The Uncomfortable Attire"	1 October 2020
82	"Photocopies"	2 October 2020
83	"Questions About Haseena's Calibre"	5 October 2020
84	"Lost Hope"	6 October 2020
85	"The Photos"	7 October 2020
86	"Karishma's Complaint"	8 October 2020
87	"The Cover-Up"	9 October 2020
88	"Leaving The City"	12 October 2020
89	"Billu's Trick"	13 October 2020
90	"The Man-Made Differences"	14 October 2020
91	"Maddam Sir's Photo"	15 October 2020
92	"Supporting Karishma Singh"	16 October 2020
93	"The Cutouts"	19 October 2020
94	"The Dream Project"	20 October 2020
95	"Irritating Karishma"	21 October 2020
96	"Santosh's Bravery"	22 October 2020
97	"The Hurry"	23 October 2020
98	"The Explanation"	26 October 2020
99	"The Proof"	27 October 2020
100	"Maa Durga's Darshan To Asthana"	28 October 2020
101	"Overpriced Onions"	29 October 2020
102	"Tracing Brijesh On The Ground"	30 October 2020
103	"The Bribe"	2 November 2020
104	"Tracing Brijesh On The Ground"	3 November 2020
105	"Haseena Is Back On Duty"	4 November 2020
106	"The Warning"	5 November 2020
107	"Pushpa's Departure"	6 November 2020
108	"Understanding The Criminal"	9 November 2020
109	"A Heated Argument"	10 November 2020
110	"No Updates Regarding Musa"	11 November 2020
111	"No Updates Regarding Musa"	12 November 2020
112	"Maddam Sir Arrives Late"	13 November 2020
113	"The Doctor's Case"	16 November 2020
114	"The Mystery Of The Mansion"	17 November 2020
115	"The Drama"	18 November 2020
116	"Santu's Emotional Moment"	19 November 2020
117	"The Help"	20 November 2020
118	"Cheetah's Concern"	23 November 2020
119	"An Old Acquaintance"	24 November 2020
120	"The Government Quarters"	25 November 2020
121	"The Decision of Marriage"	26 November 2020
122	"Will Kavita Eat The Food?"	27 November 2020
123	"The Ghost Case"	30 November 2020
124	"Karishma is Helpless"	1 December 2020
125	"Praying For The Salary"	2 December 2020
126	"Flirting"	3 December 2020
127	"The Competition"	4 December 2020
128	"The Letter"	7 December 2020
129	"An Hour's Time"	8 December 2020
130	"Haseena's Resignation"	9 December 2020
131	"An Unforgotten Incident"	10 December 2020
132	"Haldi's Behaviour gets Annoying"	11 December 2020
133	"A Funny Encounter"	14 December 2020
134	"A Fool"	15 December 2020
135	"Shankar Tries To Escape"	16 December 2020
136	"The Thief"	17 December 2020
137	"The Tight Security"	18 December 2020
138	"A Possessive Sister"	21 December 2020
139	"The Locked Door"	22 December 2020
140	"Trapped"	23 December 2020
141	"The Sharp Mind"	24 December 2020
142	"Santosh's Wishes"	25 December 2020
143	"Haseena vs Karishma"	28 December 2020
144	"Pushpa's fitness programme"	29 December 2020
145	"Pooja's Ploy"	30 December 2020
146	"Walking On Thin Ice"	31 December 2020
147	"Maddam Sir's Plan"	1 January 2021
148	"Maddam Sir's Gift"	4 January 2021
149	"Shocking news for Karishma"	5 January 2021
150	"Request For Challan"	6 January 2021
151	"File Of Bank Employee"	7 January 2021
152	"Mission Interview"	8 January 2021
153	"Haseena Finds The Truth"	11 January 2021
154	"Karishma's Investigation"	12 January 2021
155	"Billu Champat In Danger"	13 January 2021
156	"No More Wrestling"	14 January 2021
157	"Karishma's Life In Danger"	15 January 2021
158	"Karishma On The Battle Field"	18 January 2021
159	"The Maid Investigation"	19 January 2021
160	"DSP Anubhav Singh's Task"	20 January 2021
161	"Karishma Angry On Cheetah"	21 January 2021
162	"FIR Because Of Flower and Balloon"	22 January 2021
163	"Maddam Sir In Flashback"	25 January 2021
164	"Pushpa Ji Making Kabir Understand"	26 January 2021
165	"Love Lesson To Kabir"	27 January 2021
166	"Karishma Singh Hiding From Maddam Sir"	28 January 2021
167	"Karishma Singh Announces Her Decision"	29 January 2021
168	"Bulbul Pandey To Stop Off"	1 February 2021
169	"A Goodbye To Roshni"	2 February 2021
170	"Live Detector Test"	3 February 2021
171	"Pushpa Ji Make Fun Of Anubhav Singh"	4 February 2021
172	"Karishma Singh Taunts Maddam Sir"	5 February 2021
173	"Riding Towards The Mission"	8 February 2021
174	"The Private Room"	9 February 2021
175	"The Deadly Virus"	10 February 2021
176	"The Antidote"	11 February 2021
177	"Maddam Sir's Lesson For Ashok"	12 February 2021
178	"Karishma's Orders To The Team"	15 February 2021
179	"Team Tricks Ashok"	16 February 2021
180	"Ashok Request To Maddam Sir"	17 February 2021
181	"Karishma Caught The Kidnapper"	18 February 2021
182	"Maddam Sir's Request To Anubhav Singh"	19 February 2021
183	"Maddam Sir's Request To Anubhav Singh"	22 February 2021
184	"Maddam Sir Execute Her Plan"	23 February 2021
185	"Maddam Sir And Karishma Singh's Biopic"	24 February 2021
186	"The Movie Audition"	25 February 2021
187	"Maddam Sir And Karishma Singh In Practice"	26 February 2021
188	"Haseena's Different Style"	1 March 2021
189	"The Tiger Attack"	2 March 2021
190	"Karishma Singh Convince Navab Sahab"	3 March 2021
191	"Billu The Spy"	4 March 2021
192	"Billu Tells The Story"	5 March 2021
193	"Billu Tells The Story"	8 March 2021
194	"Karishma As Kayamat"	9 March 2021
195	"Pallavi Gets Hospitalize"	10 March 2021
196	"Karishma Singh Apologize To Maddam's Sir"	11 March 2021
197	"Karishma Singh And Billu On A Mission"	12 March 2021
198	"Kayamat Teaches a Lesson"	15 March 2021
199	"Karishma Singh execute Her Plan"	16 March 2021
200	"Two Cases One Qayamat"	17 March 2021
201	"Maddam Sir Is Upset"	18 March 2021
202	"Riot In Bharatpur"	19 March 2021
203	"Pushpa Ji's eyesight problem"	22 March 2021
204	"Pushpa Ji Arrested The Wrong Person"	23 March 2021
205	"Maddam Sir Is Skeptical"	24 March 2021
206	"Maddam Sir Shouts At Pushpa Ji"	25 March 2021
207	"Bulbul Pandey Has To Face Qayamat"	26 March 2021
208	"Mahila Police Station Happy"	29 March 2021
209	"Santosh Scared With Holi"	30 March 2021
210	"Santosh Scared With Holi"	31 March 2021
211	"DSP Joins Holi Celebrations"	1 April 2021
212	"DSP is Missing"	2 April 2021
213	"Madam Sirs Mind Map"	5 April 2021
214	"Madam Sirs warns Qayamat"	6 April 2021
215	"Qyamat Calls Karishma"	7 April 2021
216	"Karishma is a snitch"	8 April 2021
217	"Karishma is a snitch"	9 April 2021
218	"Treasure Is Misplaced"	12 April 2021
219	"Pushpaji Wants to Solve A Case"	13 April 2021
220	"Pushpaji Wants to Solve A Case"	14 April 2021
221	"Pushpaji Wants to Solve A Case"	15 April 2021
222	"Karishma In Trouble"	16 April 2021
223	"Dsp Uploads A Sad Video"	19 April 2021
224	"Naman Is A Liar"	20 April 2021
225	"Ko's In Police Station"	7 June 2021
226	"Karishma The New SHO"	8 June 2021
227	"Karishma VS Haseena"	9 June 2021
228	"Karishma's plans"	10 June 2021
229	"Karishma's Way Of Justice"	11 June 2021
230	"Santo Disguises As Karishma"	14 June 2021
231	"Kareshma's Bike Stolen"	15 June 2021
232	"Karishma's Hidden Bike"	16 June 2021
233	"Santo Has A Doubt On A Insider"	17 June 2021
234	"Karishma Catches The Thief"	18 June 2021
235	"A Case Against Mother"	21 June 2021
236	"Pratha's Mom Challenges Karishma Singh"	22 June 2021
237	"Bhide's Rules And Regulation For the Trip"	23 June 2021
238	"Nattu Kaka Calls Jethalal"	24 June 2021
239	"Bulbul Pandey Is Back"	25 June 2021
240	"Fir Against Karishma"	28 June 2021
241	"Kashmira Out Of The Cell"	29 June 2021
242	"Karishma Warns Haseena By Letter"	30 June 2021
243	"Aarav Learns His Lesson"	1 July 2021
244	"Karishma Sorry Gift To Haseena"	2 July 2021
245	"Karishma Singh's Image Crippled By the Media"	5 July 2021
246	"Anubhav Singh Is Back"	6 July 2021
247	"Raes's F.I.R Copy"	7 July 2021
248	"Pushpaji Weds Nawab Sahab"	8 July 2021
249	"Pushpaji Weds Nawab Sahab"	9 July 2021
250	"Pushpaji Sole Warrior"	12 July 2021
251	"Karishma's Team Bonding and Building"	13 July 2021
252	"Karishma Calls Out Haseena In The Presence Of Media"	14 July 2021
253	"Maddam Sir Has A Plan"	15 July 2021
254	"Anubhav Singh Kidnapped"	16 July 2021
255	"Haseena Wins Back Her Police Station"	19 July 2021
256	"Haseena Wins Back Her Police Station"	20 July 2021
257	"Cheetah Has To Marry Naman"	21 July 2021
258	"Cheetah Has To Marry Naman"	22 July 2021
259	"Karishma's Work From Home"	23 July 2021
260	"Keshav Gets Fired"	26 July 2021
261	"Cheetah And Billu Rob Keshav's Boss's Laptop"	27 July 2021
262	"Haseena To Get Engaged"	28 July 2021
263	"Haseena To Get Engaged"	29 July 2021
264	"Karishma Singh Comes To Know About The Pictures"	30 July 2021
265	"The Case Of Fake Account"	2 August 2021
266	"The Case Of Fake Account"	3 August 2021
267	"Samir And Shalu Meet"	4 August 2021
268	"Anubhav Don't Want To Do The Engagement"	5 August 2021
269	"Anubhav Is Coward"	6 August 2021
270	"Komal And Haseena Share The Same Faith"	9 August 2021
271	"Haseena Arrests Ankit And His Mother"	10 August 2021
272	"Haseena Arrests Ankit And His Mother"	11 August 2021
273	"Hasina Is Offered Bribe"	12 August 2021
274	"Haseena Has Made A Mistake"	13 August 2021
275	"Haseena Has Made A Mistake"	16 August 2021
276	"Fought In Tier Gas"	17 August 2021
277	"Fought In Tier Gas"	18 August 2021
278	"Haseena Confronts Karishma"	19 August 2021
279	"Karishma Investigates Riya"	20 August 2021
280	"Pushpa's Diary Book"	23 August 2021
281	"Haseena Receives Threatening Calls"	24 August 2021
282	"Karishma's New Job"	25 August 2021
283	"Haseena Is Scared For Karishma"	26 August 2021
284	"Haseena Wants Karishma To Find Her Replacement"	27 August 2021
285	"Karishma's Replacement"	30 August 2021
286	"Barbie Is A Spy"	31 August 2021
287	"The Search Of The Sketch"	1 September 2021
288	"Billu Receives The Information About The Man IN The Sketch"	2 September 2021
289	"Haseena and Karishma's Misunderstanding"	3 September 2021
290	"Haseena Sends Karishma For An Audition"	6 September 2021
291	"Karishma To Reveal The Racket"	7 September 2021
292	"Haseena Reveals Barbie's Identity"	8 September 2021
293	"Karishma Singh - The Suspect"	9 September 2021
294	"Maddam Sir And Karishma Singh’s Alliance"	10 September 2021
295	"The Hair Cutting Bandit"	13 September 2021
296	"Santosh Is Getting Married"	14 September 2021
297	"Santosh Is Getting Married"	15 September 2021
298	"Santosh Is Getting Married"	16 September 2021
299	"Santosh’s Brother Blames Cheetah"	17 September 2021
300	"Santosh's Life On The Balance"	20 September 2021
301	"Santosh Gains Consciousness"	21 September 2021
302	"Ratan Singh Arrests 3 Girls"	22 September 2021
303	"Ratan Singh Trapped"	23 September 2021
304	"Haseena’s Video Launch"	24 September 2021
305	"Pushpa Ji Eats Karishma’s Tiffin"	27 September 2021
306	"Pushpa Ji Lies To Maddam Sir"	28 September 2021
307	"Pushpa Ji Gets An Anonymous Call"	29 September 2021
308	"Rupa’s Truth Unveiled"	30 September 2021
309	"Karishma Singh Chats With Lalla"	1 October 2021
310	"Karishma Doesn't Support Haseena's Decision"	4 October 2021
311	"Who Is Sahara?"	5 October 2021
312	"The Truth Of Sonia aka Sahara"	6 October 2021
313	"Breaking News Or Rumour?"	7 October 2021
314	"Cheetah's Mobile Phone Gets Busted"	8 October 2021
315	"Challenge For Haseena"	9 October 2021
316	"Celebrity Or DSP?"	11 October 2021
317	"Meaningless Idiom"	12 October 2021
318	"Billu Leaves The Station"	13 October 2021
319	"Haseena Convinces Paritosh"	14 October 2021
320	"Complaint For The Parents"	15 October 2021
321	"The Teachers' Scam"	16 October 2021
322	"Aparna Brings The List Of Complaints"	18 October 2021
323	"Sushma Gets Assaulted By A Biker!"	19 October 2021
324	"Billu Helps Haseena"	20 October 2021
325	"Maddam Sir Sets A Plan"	21 October 2021
326	"Report For Noise Pollution"	22 October 2021
327	"Haseena Apologises"	23 October 2021
328	"Haseena's Plan For Mr. Bhalla"	25 October 2021
329	"Maddam Sir On Radio Show"	26 October 2021
330	"Mobile Addiction"	27 October 2021
331	"Mission Successful"	28 October 2021
332	"The Shaadi Case!"	29 October 2021
333	"Rescuing The Dog"	30 October 2021
334	"Finding Soulmate"	1 November 2021
335	"Important Victory"	2 November 2021
336	"Karishma Singh Catches The Thieves"	3 November 2021
337	"Target"	4 November 2021
338	"Pushpa Ji In Trouble"	5 November 2021
339	"Haseena Malik To Kidnap Someone!"	6 November 2021
340	"Pushpaji Attempts To Take Her Own Life"	8 November 2021
341	"Robot Appointed As Police Officer"	9 November 2021
342	"Robot Attacks Karishma"	10 November 2021
343	"Mira Solves The Case"	11 November 2021
344	"Mira On Night Duty"	12 November 2021
345	"Mira's First Case"	13 November 2021
346	"Bomb In The Club"	15 November 2021
347	"Mira's Idea"	16 November 2021
348	"Karishma's Plan"	17 November 2021
349	"Pushpa Ji Finds Mira"	18 November 2021
350	"Arjun Baba Is Arrested"	19 November 2021
351	"Haseena- The Crystal Lady"	20 November 2021
352	"Mira Goes Missing Again!"	22 November 2021
353	"A Haunted Police Station"	23 November 2021
354	"Where Is Karishma?"	24 November 2021
355	"Pushpa Ji Is Back!"	25 November 2021
356	"Maddam Sir Faces The Charges Of Corruption"	26 November 2021
357	"Will Haseena Malik Prove Her Innocence?"	27 November 2021
358	"Maddam Sir Proves Her Honesty!"	29 November 2021
359	"Mira Chases The Cab To Kanpur!"	30 November 2021
360	"Mira Tries To Trap Nikhil"	1 December 2021
361	"Pushpa Ji Is Sad For Her Son!"	2 December 2021
362	"Nikhil Comes To Register FIR For Mira"	3 December 2021
363	"Where Is Haseena’s Gun?"	4 December 2021
364	"Mira Finds The Culprits!"	6 December 2021
365	"Haseena Malik Tries To Teach A Lesson"	7 December 2021
366	"Karishma Tries To Convince Mira"	8 December 2021
367	"Mira And Pushpa Ji Disguise As Laborers"	9 December 2021
368	"Haseena Malik's Plan For Shyam Factory"	10 December 2021
369	"A Deaf-Mute Man Is Found Tied In Ropes"	11 December 2021
370	"The Team Applauds For Mira"	13 December 2021
371	"Maddam Sir & Team Chase Arpit"	14 December 2021
372	"Karishma Singh Gets Injured!"	15 December 2021
373	"Mira Kidnaps Rahul!"	16 December 2021
374	"Mira Apologises To Pushpa Ji"	17 December 2021
375	"Mira- The Hero"	18 December 2021
376	"Mira Gets A Learning On Needs Of People"	20 December 2021
377	"Karishma Wants To Accompany Haseena For The Case"	21 December 2021
378	"Mira Copies Karishma"	22 December 2021
379	"Karishma Taunts Haseena To Be Soft Hearted!"	23 December 2021
380	"Pushpa Ji Sells Her Jewellery For Money!"	24 December 2021
381	"Karishma And Santosh Disguise To Solve A Case"	25 December 2021
382	"Will Karishma's Plan Help To Trace The Fraudster?"	27 December 2021
383	"Cheetah Finds The Missing Girl"	28 December 2021
384	"Pushpa Ji Finds Sapna At Santosh's House"	29 December 2021
385	"Karishma Gets A Plan To Save Sapna"	30 December 2021
386	"Mahila Police Station Miss Haseena Malik On New Year"	31 December 2021
387	"A Lazy Beginning"	1 January 2022
388	"Akash Kumar Is Arrested"	3 January 2022
389	"Will Karishma's Plan Work?"	4 January 2022
390	"Worried Pushpa Ji"	5 January 2022
391	"Birthday Preparations"	6 January 2022
392	"Bikers Chase Haseena For The Disk"	7 January 2022
393	"Meera Fires Bullets At Haseena"	8 January 2022
394	"Karishma Vows To Catch The Culprits"	10 January 2022
395	"Mira Solves The Case"	11 January 2022
396	"Karishma Is Allotted A Task By DSP"	12 January 2022
397	"Maddam Sir Part 2"	13 January 2022
398	"Urmila Accepts Pushpa Ji's Offer"	14 January 2022
399	"Urmila Set To Wear Maddam Sir's Shoes"	15 January 2022
400	"Urmila Gets Out Of Hand"	17 January 2022
401	"Haseena Acts To Be Urmila"	18 January 2022
402	"Urmila Fails To Solve The Case"	19 January 2022
403	"Will The Plan Work To Catch The Thief?"	20 January 2022
404	"Karishma Singh Gets Hurt"	21 January 2022
405	"Marriage Discussions"	22 January 2022
406	"Haseena Takes A Sigh Of Relief"	24 January 2022
407	"'Bolti Band' App"	25 January 2022
408	"Anubhav Singh Is Back"	26 January 2022
409	"Urmila Likes Anubhav"	27 January 2022
410	"Karishma Singh Loses Her Cool Again"	28 January 2022
411	"Haseena Gets Intel About Anubhav"	29 January 2022
412	"Karishma's Vow"	31 January 2022
413	"A Fight For Public Toilets"	1 February 2022
414	"A Food Festival"	2 February 2022
415	"Anubhav Keeps Urmila At A Gunpoint"	3 February 2022
416	"Daadi Ji Invites Pushpa Ji For Wedding"	4 February 2022
417	"Will Haseena Be Able To Guard The HardDrive?"	5 February 2022
418	"Haseena's Style To Teach A Lesson"	7 February 2022
419	"Justice For Sunita"	8 February 2022
420	"A Mission Failure"	9 February 2022
421	"Anubhav Gets Suspicious Of Urmila"	10 February 2022
422	"Will Anubhav Get To Know About Urmi"	11 February 2022
423	"Karishma Loses Hope"	12 February 2022
424	"Haseena Solves The Case"	14 February 2022
425	"Pushpa Ji Asks Karishma To Do Some Chores"	15 February 2022
426	"Karishma Tries To Search For Babloo"	16 February 2022
427	"Haseena Succeeds In The Experiment"	17 February 2022
428	"Haseena Is Shocked To See Her Mother"	18 February 2022
429	"Will Haseena Able To Find Swati"	19 February 2022
430	"Haseena Succeeds In Her Plan"	21 February 2022
431	"Online Fraud Complaint Against Santosh"	22 February 2022
432	"Karishma Gets Angry On Bulbul Pandey"	23 February 2022
433	"International Pop Star"	24 February 2022
434	"Anubhav Knows The Reality Of Haseena"	25 February 2022
435	"The Necklace Is Found"	26 February 2022
436	"Haseena's Plan"	28 February 2022
437	"Haseena Makes Fun Of Billu's Dream"	1 March 2022
438	"Haseena's Plan"	2 March 2022
439	"Pushpa Ji Meets Her 'Bua-Saas'"	3 March 2022
440	"Bua Saas' At Karishma's Work Place!"	4 March 2022
441	"Manju's Little Problem"	5 March 2022
442	"Karishma Arrives To The Police Station"	7 March 2022
443	"Chandramukhi Gives A Solid Answer"	8 March 2022
444	"Will Chandramukhi Be Able To Solve The Case?"	9 March 2022
445	"Chandramukhi Vs Haseena Mallik"	10 March 2022
446	"Will Karishma's Plan Help To Trap The Criminals?"	11 March 2022
447	"Cheetah Gets Married To A Thief!"	12 March 2022
448	"Cheetah Takes Stand For His Parents"	14 March 2022
449	"Pushpa Ji Becomes 'Daadi'"	15 March 2022
450	"Karishma Suspects Sakshi"	16 March 2022
451	"Pushpa Shouts At Karishma"	17 March 2022
452	"How Will Haseena Expose Anubhav?"	18 March 2022
453	"A Tough Choice"	19 March 2022
454	"Karishma Fired A Bullet At Anubhav"	21 March 2022
455	"Karishma Helps Haseena"	22 March 2022
456	"Haseena Mallik Asks For Increment"	23 March 2022
457	"Pushpa Ji Craves For A Burger"	24 March 2022
458	"Maddam Sir Sells Vada Pav"	25 March 2022
459	"Will Haseena Be Able To Regain Her Memories?"	26 March 2022
460	"The Truth Of The Thief"	28 March 2022
461	"Haseena's Shocking Message For Pushpa Ji"	29 March 2022
462	"Haseena Malik Has To Take A Lie Detector Test"	30 March 2022
463	"Maddam Sir Is Still Playing Pretend!"	31 March 2022
464	"Karishma Singh Sets A Trap"	1 April 2022
465	"Pushpa Ji Gets Caught Badmouthing Karishma!"	2 April 2022
466	"Karishma Singh Takes Maddam Sir On A Mission"	4 April 2022
467	"The Water Supply Of Police Station Gets Cut Off!"	5 April 2022
468	"Santu On A 'Date' For The Mission "Water Problem""	6 April 2022
469	"Nawab Sahab Started A Shooting At The Police Station"	7 April 2022
470	"Pushpa Ji Grabs A Romantic Role In A Movie"	8 April 2022
471	"How Will Karishma Save Pushpa Ji From This Mess?"	9 April 2022
472	"Urmila Is Fired From the Job As "Maddam Sir""	11 April 2022
473	"Haseena Mallik Is Back In The Game!"	12 April 2022
474	"Haseena Mallik Takes Urmila's Accent Again!"	13 April 2022
475	"Haseena Mallik Investigates Rashid's Case"	14 April 2022
476	"Haseena Plans An 'Iftaar' Party"	15 April 2022
477	"Cheetah And Santosh Out For Patrolling"	16 April 2022
478	"Maddam Sir Doubts"	18 April 2022
479	"Maddam Sir Playing Cricket"	19 April 2022
480	"PushpaJi's Misconception"	20 April 2022
481	"Maddam Sir's Demand"	21 April 2022
482	"Karishma Is Searching For Pinky"	22 April 2022
483	"The Realization"	23 April 2022
484	"Karishma In A New Look"	25 April 2022
485	"Pushpa Ji Requests To Maddam Sir"	26 April 2022
486	"What Happened To Karishma?"	27 April 2022
487	"Will Haseena Be Able To Rescue A Little Girl?"	28 April 2022
488	"How Will Haseena Mallik Change A Child's Thinking?"	29 April 2022
489	"Haseena Mallik Is Successful In Her Plan"	30 April 2022
490	"Karishma's Attitude"	2 May 2022
491	"Marriage Counseling"	3 May 2022
492	"Haseena Is Impressed With Karishma's "Cool Attitude""	4 May 2022
493	"Maddam Sir Receives A Mysterious Letter"	5 May 2022
494	"Karishma & Haseena's Out Of The Box Strategy!"	6 May 2022
495	"Santosh Sharma And Karishma Singh Sneak Into A House"	7 May 2022
496	"Haseena And Pushpa Ji Go On A Date"	9 May 2022
497	"Why Is Haseena Questioning Her Mother?"	10 May 2022
498	"Haseena Is Trying To Save A Marriage"	11 May 2022
499	"Karishma Singh Investigates A Movie Set"	12 May 2022
500	"Karishma's Modelling Gig"	13 May 2022
501	"Karishma, Santosh And Cheetah In Disguise"	14 May 2022
502	"Why Is Karishma Singh Attending Haseena's Calls?"	16 May 2022
503	"Why Is Karishma Singh In Search Of Lucy?"	17 May 2022
504	"Karishma Singh Mistakenly Gives A Kiss To Pushpa Ji"	18 May 2022
505	"Does Karishma Want To Get Pushpa Ji Married?"	19 May 2022
506	"Pushpa Ji Meets Her Match"	20 May 2022
507	"A Savory Diamond"	21 May 2022
508	"Pushpa Ji Dresses Up Like Karishma"	23 May 2022
509	"Pushpa Ji Hides Her Identity"	24 May 2022
510	"Karishma Comes To Haseena's Rescue"	25 May 2022
511	"Santosh And Cheetah Go On A Date"	26 May 2022
512	"Maddam Sir & Team Gets Threatened"	27 May 2022
513	"Why Is Cheetah Shouting In Pain?"	28 May 2022
514	"Karishma Goes Live On Social Media"	30 May 2022
515	"The Best Female Police Officer"	31 May 2022
516	"The Entry Of A New SHO"	1 June 2022
517	"Amar Catches Haseena Staring At Him"	2 June 2022
518	"Pushpa Ji Shares Her Nightmare With Karishma"	3 June 2022
519	"A Pact Between Amar Vidrohi & Haseena Mallik"	4 June 2022
520	"An Open War Between Haseena & Amar!"	6 June 2022
521	"Diwan Accuses Women Of Being Fake Feminist"	7 June 2022
522	"S.H.O. Amar Gives Foot Massage To Haseena!"	8 June 2022
523	"Why Does Amar Call The Bomb Squad?"	9 June 2022
524	"Will Haseena Find Out About The Masked Girl?"	10 June 2022
525	"Will Haseena & Karishma Be Able To Save Amar?"	11 June 2022
526	"Interested In Defeating Enemies"	13 June 2022
527	"Santosh Is Kidnapped"	14 June 2022
528	"How Will Amar Singh Save Santosh?"	15 June 2022
529	"A Happy Moment"	16 June 2022
530	"Perspectives"	17 June 2022
531	"Nandu's Spirit"	18 June 2022
532	"A Special Kind Of A Chemical"	20 June 2022
533	"Amar's Life"	21 June 2022
534	"Maddam Sir Threatens Amar Singh"	22 June 2022
535	"Teamwork"	23 June 2022
536	"Kidnapping"	24 June 2022
537	"A New Case"	25 June 2022
538	"A Stubborn Child"	27 June 2022
539	"Drug Dealing"	28 June 2022
540	"The Real Culprit"	29 June 2022
541	"Haseena Relieves Amar From His Services"	30 June 2022
542	"Amar Signs-Up For A Dating App"	1 July 2022
543	"Urge To Win"	2 July 2022
544	"Charges On Karishma"	4 July 2022
545	"An Investigation"	5 July 2022
546	"Will Haseena Mallik Meet Karishma Singh?"	6 July 2022
547	"A Marriage Proposal"	7 July 2022
548	"The Ring"	8 July 2022
549	"A Lesson"	9 July 2022
550	"Planning To Catch The Culprit"	11 July 2022
551	"Karishma Singh's Effort"	12 July 2022
552	"The Plan"	13 July 2022
553	"Maddam Sir's Photo On Newspaper"	14 July 2022
554	"The Trap"	15 July 2022
555	"Prachi's Case Solved"	16 July 2022
556	"Does Karishma Singh Know About Maddam Sir?"	18 July 2022
557	"Cowardice"	19 July 2022
558	"Amar Singh's Strategy"	20 July 2022
559	"An Act Of Realization"	21 July 2022
560	"Mishri Pandey As A New SHO"	22 July 2022
561	"Spot Search"	23 July 2022
562	"Karishma Singh In A New Mission"	25 July 2022
563	"An Accident"	26 July 2022
564	"Misri Pandey Misleads Cheetah And Santosh"	27 July 2022
565	"Potholes"	28 July 2022
566	"Donation"	29 July 2022
567	"An Advertisement"	30 July 2022
568	"Will Misri Pandey Let The Platform Sell?"	1 August 2022
569	"A Fraud Done"	2 August 2022
570	"Film Shooting"	3 August 2022
571	"Duplicate"	4 August 2022
572	"Kareena As Karishma Singh"	5 August 2022
573	"Maddam Sir Is Back"	6 August 2022
574	"Cheating In Dreams"	8 August 2022
575	"Kareena's Gimmick"	9 August 2022
576	"A Blunder Happens With Cheetah"	10 August 2022
577	"Santosh Fired"	11 August 2022
578	"Swapping Of Roles"	12 August 2022
579	"Will Karishma Singh Be Able To Play The Role Of Kareena?"	13 August 2022
580	"Will Kareena Be Able To Catch Roopa?"	15 August 2022
581	"Kareena On Duty"	16 August 2022
582	"Kareena Is Celebrating Raksha Bandhan"	17 August 2022
583	"Independence Day Celebration"	18 August 2022
584	"Missing Bikes"	19 August 2022
585	"Helpless Bride Case"	20 August 2022
586	"Kareena's Guru 'Pushpa Ji'"	22 August 2022
587	"'Rama Ko Kaise Kare Madad'"	23 August 2022
588	"'Jeevan Par Adhikar'"	24 August 2022
589	"Electricity Ka Bill"	25 August 2022
590	"Thaane Ki Light Kati"	26 August 2022
591	"Khud Se Shaadii"	27 August 2022
592	"Sarpa Mitra"	29 August 2022
593	"Snake Movement"	30 August 2022
594	"Nagin Ka Pratishodh"	31 August 2022
595	"Flight Mein Bomb"	1 September 2022
596	"Running Out Of Ideas"	2 September 2022
597	"Outwitting The Prank Callers"	3 September 2022
598	"Aryan Ki Zidd"	5 September 2022
599	"Aryan Ki Sacchai"	6 September 2022
600	"Memory Gayab"	7 September 2022
601	"Long Lost Brother"	8 September 2022
602	"Bhootiya Drama"	9 September 2022
603	"Pizza Delivery"	10 September 2022
604	"Kidnappers Ka Peecha"	12 September 2022
605	"Bombscare"	13 September 2022
606	"Bomber Kaun Hai?"	14 September 2022
607	"Beheno Mein Daraar"	15 September 2022
608	"Kareena Khatre Mein"	16 September 2022
609	"Defusing The Threat"	17 September 2022
610	"John Tripathi Ka Interrogation"	19 September 2022
611	"Rejection Ka Dukh"	20 September 2022
612	"Convincing Janhavi"	21 September 2022
613	"Property Dispute"	22 September 2022
614	"Dispute Kaise Solve Hoga"	23 September 2022
615	"Thaane Ka Inspection"	24 September 2022
616	"Ghar Wapsi"	26 September 2022
617	"Election Ka Mahaul"	27 September 2022
618	"Ghar Chodne Ki Dhamki"	28 September 2022
619	"Election Fever"	29 September 2022
620	"Nakli Kidnapping"	30 September 2022
621	"Nakli Kidnapping"	1 October 2022
622	"Raman's Kidnappers"	3 October 2022
623	"Performance Pressure"	4 October 2022
624	"Purse Ki Chori"	5 October 2022
625	"Chor Ka Peecha"	6 October 2022
626	"Rachna's Husband Returns"	7 October 2022
627	"Lehenga Jalao Gang"	8 October 2022
628	"Mehnghi Shaadi Ka Bojh"	10 October 2022
629	"Haar Ki Taiyaari"	11 October 2022
630	"Sadak Chaap Gunde"	12 October 2022
631	"Wardi Ki Izzat"	13 October 2022
632	"Chingari Gang"	14 October 2022
633	"Rangrez Gali Ka Insaaf"	15 October 2022
634	"Chingaari Gang Ka Peecha"	17 October 2022
635	"Chingaari Gang Reaches The Station"	18 October 2022
636	"Cheetah's Confession"	19 October 2022
637	"Chingaari Gang Ka Badla"	20 October 2022
638	"Asli Chor Ki Talaash"	21 October 2022
639	"Billu Gets Caught"	22 October 2022
640	"Chingari Gang's Way Of Justice"	24 October 2022
641	"Manjari Ka Insaaf"	25 October 2022
642	"Shivani Ka Purana Case"	26 October 2022
643	"Shivani's Fight For Justice"	27 October 2022
644	"Shivani's Revenge"	28 October 2022
645	"Maddam Sir Ke Jazbaat"	29 October 2022
646	"Mukhauta"	31 October 2022
647	"Justice For Shivani"	1 November 2022
648	"Chingari Gang Ki Jeet"	2 November 2022
649	"Maddam SIr Ki Aakhiri Umeed"	3 November 2022
650	"Kidnapped Lovers"	4 November 2022
651	"Mahila Thana Ki Burri Dasha"	5 November 2022
652	"Khala Ka Case"	7 November 2022
653	"Jhooti FIR"	8 November 2022
654	"Shivani's Help"	9 November 2022
655	"Shivani's New Target"	10 November 2022
656	"Liquor In Black"	11 November 2022
657	"Sharab Ke Khilaaf Ladaai"	12 November 2022
658	"Sharab Ke Khilaaf Ladaai"	14 November 2022
659	"Shivani Ka Anshan"	15 November 2022
660	"Shivani's Life In Danger"	16 November 2022
661	"Chingaari Gang Ki Jasoosi"	17 November 2022
662	"Haseena Ki Jaan Khatre Mein"	18 November 2022
663	"Karishma Detains Shivani"	19 November 2022
664	"Snitch In The Gang"	21 November 2022
665	"Karishma's Loyalty"	22 November 2022
666	"Chingari Gang Ki Suraksha"	23 November 2022
667	"Karishma's Oath"	24 November 2022
668	"Cheetah's Guilt"	25 November 2022
669	"Chasing The Chingari"	26 November 2022
670	"Cheetah Ka Dhokha"	28 November 2022
671	"Cheetah Ki Jaan Khatre Mein"	29 November 2022
672	"Binny vs Shivani"	30 November 2022
673	"Sacchai Ka Rasta"	1 December 2022
674	"Aakhri Ladai"	2 December 2022
675	"Maddam Sir Bani Urmila"	3 December 2022
676	"Haseena Ki Pariksha"	5 December 2022
677	"Strength In Unity"	6 December 2022
678	"Haseena Ke Khilaaf Saboot"	7 December 2022
679	"Galti Akhir Hai Kiski?"	8 December 2022
680	"Bulbul Ki Kamzori"	9 December 2022
681	"Bulbul Ke Khilaaf Report"	10 December 2022
682	"Dhanlakshmi Ki Complaint"	12 December 2022
683	"Commissioner Ki Beti"	13 December 2022
684	"Lehkika Ka Thana Experience"	14 December 2022
685	"Varun Vs Bala Clinic"	15 December 2022
686	"Kaanooni Bhaukaal"	16 December 2022
687	"Haseena's Resignation"	17 December 2022
688	"Bus Out Of Control"	19 December 2022
689	"Mira G Rejoins The Team"	20 December 2022
690	"Pushpa Ji Ki Rakhwaali"	21 December 2022
691	"Saving Pushpa Ji"	22 December 2022
692	"Negotiating With The Joker"	23 December 2022
693	"Future Mein Chori"	24 December 2022
694	"Bracelet Ki Chori"	26 December 2022
695	"Chandu Ya Chandani?"	27 December 2022
696	"Zehreeli Kheer"	28 December 2022
697	"Karishma Aur Cheetah Ka Sting Operation"	29 December 2022
698	"Nakli Bulbul Pandey"	30 December 2022
699	"Behroopiya Terrorist"	31 December 2022
700	"Saving Bulbul Pandey's Marriage"	2 January 2023
701	"Padosiyo Ke Beech Ladai"	3 January 2023
702	"Fasaad Ki Jadd"	4 January 2023
703	"Chal Chal Chal App Ka Scam"	5 January 2023
704	"Online Daaku"	6 January 2023
705	"Setting A Trap For Rohan"	7 January 2023
706	"Chor Bazaar Ka Samaan"	9 January 2023
707	"Case Of The Wax Statue"	10 January 2023
708	"Raiding The Illegal Auction"	11 January 2023
709	"Maddam Sir Faces The Author"	12 January 2023
710	"Pushpa Ji Ka Plan"	13 January 2023
711	"Fight Against Smugglers"	14 January 2023
712	"Thane Mein Magarmach"	16 January 2023
713	"Shaadi Mein Ladai"	17 January 2023
714	"Arav's Case"	18 January 2023
715	"Best Friend Ka Welcome"	19 January 2023
716	"Naina Ke Aashiq"	20 January 2023
717	"Band Darwaze Ke Andar Sehna"	21 January 2023
718	"Madad Ki Pukaar"	23 January 2023
719	"Barkha Ki Himmat"	24 January 2023
720	"Operation Bank Robbery"	25 January 2023
721	"Negotiating With The Robbers"	26 January 2023
722	"Azadi Se Jeene Ka Adhikar"	27 January 2023
723	"Powerful Politician"	28 January 2023
724	"Maddam Sir Ki Kranti"	30 January 2023
725	"Vandana Suri's Case"	31 January 2023
726	"Polygraph Test"	1 February 2023
727	"Naina's Mission"	2 February 2023
728	"Chor Reunion Party"	3 February 2023
729	"Cherry Ka Khulasa"	4 February 2023
730	"Pushpa Ji Ki Good News"	6 February 2023
731	"Pregnancy Ka Sach"	7 February 2023
732	"Pushpa Ji's First Case"	8 February 2023
733	"Billu Ka Humshakal"	9 February 2023
734	"Commissioner Ki Kidnapping"	10 February 2023
735	"Rescuing The Commissioner"	11 February 2023
736	"Maddam Sir Ki Cousin"	13 February 2023
737	"Shazia Ki Majboori"	14 February 2023
738	"Shazia's Case"	15 February 2023
739	"Mission Devalpar"	16 February 2023
740	"Defending The Thana"	17 February 2023
741	"Maddam Sir Ka Promotion"	18 February 2023
