= Dil Diyaan Gallaan =

Indian drama television series

- Also known as: Dil Diyaan Gallaan – Dil Ki Baatein
- Genre: Drama
- Written by: Shabia Ravi Walia; Malvika Asthana; Munisha Rajpal
- Directed by: Jaackson Sethi
- Creative director: Amit Sharma
- Starring: See below
- Country of origin: India
- Original language: Urdu
- No. of seasons: 1
- No. of episodes: 272

Production
- Producer: Rashmi Sharma
- Camera setup: Multi-camera
- Production company: Rashmi Sharma Telefilms

Original release
- Network: Sony SAB; Sony LIV
- Release: 12 December 2022 – 24 October 2023

Dil Diyaan Gallaan (transl. The talks of heart) also known as Dil Diyaan Gallaan – Dil Ki Baatein is an Indian television drama series that premiered from 12 December 2022 to 24 October 2023 on Sony SAB, and is digitally available on SonyLIV. Produced by Rashmi Sharma Telefilms, it starred Kaveri Priyam, Paras Arora and Devoleena Bhattacharjee.

== Overview ==
The show revolves around a rural Punjabi Sikh Family, Brar Family from a small district Hoshiarpur in Punjab.The show covers the conflict between the families which has reached the third generation, who now tries to reunite the family. Amrita Brar, the elder granddaughter of the family, who wished to unite their estranged family members accidentally arrived to her native house, from United States that started a series of crest and troughs faced by the family members. The story also covers the love triangle between Amrita, Veer— the adopted son of the house and Riya, the younger granddaughter of the house. After innumerous efforts made by Amrita, the family came under one roof. But, Amrita soon dies after giving birth to her and Veer's daughter— Alia. The show takes a leap of 10 years following the story of fourth generation.

== Cast ==
=== Main ===
- Kaveri Priyam as Amrita "Amu" Brar Dungarpal: Aastha and Mandeep's daughter; Riya's elder cousin sister; Aditya's childhood best friend; Veer's first wife; Alia's mother (2022–2023)(Dead)
- Paras Arora as Dr. Veer Dungarpal Singh: Dilpreet and Sanjyot's adopted son; Amrita's widower; Disha's second husband; Aliya's father; Shikhar's step-father (2022–2023)
- Pankaj Berry as Dilpreet Singh Brar: Sanjyot's husband; Mandeep, and Randeep's father; Veer's foster father; Amrita and Riya's grandfather; Alia and Shikhar 's great-grandfather. (2022–2023)
- Jasjeet Babbar as Sanjyot Kaur Brar: Paramjeet's sister; Dilpreet's wife; Mandeep and Randeep's mother; Veer's foster mother; Amrita and Riya's grandmother; Alia and Shikhar's great-grandmother (2022–2023)
- Sandeep Baswana as Dr. Mandeep Singh Brar: Dilpreet and Sanjyot's eldest son; Randeep's brother; Veer's adoptive brother; Aastha's husband; Amrita's father; Alia's grandfather (2022–2023)
- Reema Vohra as Dr. Aastha Kaur Brar: Mandeep's wife; Amrita's mother; Alia's grandmother (2022–2023)
- Ravi Gossain as Randeep Singh Brar: Dilpreet and Sanjyot's younger son; Mandeep's brother; Veer's adoptive brother; Nimrit's husband; Riya's father (2022–2023)
- Kanika Maheshwari as Nimrit Kaur Brar: Simran's sister; Randeep's wife; Riya's mother (2022–2023)
- Reyaansh Vir Chadha as Dollar Singh Bhinder: Khushwant and Jaspreet's son; Riya's husband (2023)
- Hema Sood as Riya Brar Bhinder: Randeep and Nimrit's daughter; Amrita's cousin; Veer's ex-fiancée; Dollar's wife (2022–2023)
- Devoleena Bhattacharjee as Disha Chaddha Dungarpal (formerly Mehta): Salty's daughter; Rohan's ex-wife; Veer's second wife; Shikhar's mother; Alia's step-mother. (2023)
- Hansika Jangid as Alia Dungarpal: Amrita and Veer's daughter; Disha's step-daughter; Shikhar's half-sister (2023)
- Swastik Tiwari as Shikhar Dungarpal (formerly Mehta): Disha and Rohan's son; Veer's step-son; Alia's half-brother (2023)

=== Recurring ===
- Vineet Raina as Rohan Mehta: Disha's ex–husband; Shikhar's father (2023)
- Prachi Pathak as Salty Chaddha: Disha's mother; Shikhar's grandmother; Alia's step-grandmother; Amrita's murderer (2023)
- Jeetendra Bharadwaj as Harneet Singh: Param's husband; Dilpreet's friend (2022–2023)
- Seema Anand as Paramjeet Singh: Harneet's wife; Sanjyot's sister (2022–2023)
- Neha Diwakar as Preeti: Neena's daughter (2023)
- Akshay Saini as Gabru: Preeti's love; Dollar's friend (2023)
- Piyush as Samar: Veer's friend (2023)
- Abhishek Sharma as Aditya aka Adi: Amrita's childhood best friend (2022–2023)
- Vipul Tyagi as Lucky: Veer's best friend (2022–2023)
- Sumeet Thakur as Sukhwinder "Sukhi" Singh: Khushwant's friend (2022–2023)
- Jaswant Menaria as Khushwant Singh Bhinder: Dilpreet's enemy; Tavleen's son; Prabhjyot's brother; Jaspreet's husband; Dollar's father (2022–2023)
- Dolphin Dwivedi as Prabhjyot Bhinder: Tavleen's daughter; Amar's ex-wife; Khushwant's sister; Mandeep's ex-fiancé; Veer's biological mother; Alia's grandmother (2022; 2023)
- Shivani Gosain as Jaspreet "Jassi" Bhinder: Khushwant's wife; Dollar's mother (2023)
- Manmeet Singh as Gurpreet "Guru" Singh: Sanjyot's childhood friend (2023)
- Shweta Dadhich as Simran: Nimrit's sister (2023)
- Jayati Bhatia as Tavleen Bhinder: Khushwant and Prabhjyot's mother; Dollar and Veer's grandmother; Alia's great-grandmother; Shikhar's step-great-grandmother (2023)

== Production ==
=== Casting ===
Initially, Harshad Arora was in talks to play male lead, but later backed out due to his prior commitments.

Kaveri Priyam and Paras Arora were signed as the lead.

Pankaj Berry was cast to portray father opposite Ravi Gossain and Sandeep Baswana.

In December 2022, Abhishek Sharma was cast to portray Aditya.

In April 2023, Reyaansh Vir Chadha was cast to portray Dollar Singh.

In September 2023, Kaveri Priyam, Reema Vohra, Reyaansh Vir Chadha and Hema Sood quit the show. In the same month, Devoleena Bhattacharjee, Vineet Raina, Swastik Tiwari, Hansika Jangid joined the cast after a 10-year leap as Disha, Rohan, Shikar and Aliya Dungarpal.

In October 2023, the show went off-air, Reema Vohra who portrayed Dr. Aastha Kaur Brar returned for the final episodes.

=== Development ===
The series was announced by Rashmi Sharma Telefilms in September 2022 and was confirmed in October 2022 by Sony SAB.

The series is set in Amritsar, Punjab and mainly shot at the Film City, Mumbai.

== Soundtrack ==
Dil Diyaan Gallaan

Soundtrack album by Mohd. Danish
- Released: 2022
- Genre: Romance; Soundtrack
- Length: 1:00
- Language: Hindi
- Label: Culver Max Entertainment

Music video
- "Dil Diyaan Gallaan" on YouTube

Tracklisting
No.	Title	Length
1.	"Dil Diyaan Gallaan"	1:00

== See also ==
- List of programmes broadcast by Sony SAB
