= Vash: Possessed by the Obsessed =

VASH- Possessed by the Obsessed
- Directed by: Jagmeet singh Samundri
- Screenplay by: Jagmeet singh Samundri
- Produced by: Ganga Mamgai
- Starring: Ganga Mamgai; Vivek Jaitly; Rituraj Singh; Kaveri Priyam; Preeti Kochar
- Cinematography: Manoj Shaw
- Edited by: Jagmeet singh Samundri
- Music by: Mukhtar Sahota
- Production company: Twin flame production
- Release date: 21 July 2023
- Country: India
- Language: Hindi

Vash- Possessed by the Obsessed is an Indian Hindi horror film produced by Ganga Mamgai under the banner of Twin Flame Production. Directed by Jagmeet Singh Samundri, who also penned the story, screenplay, and dialogues.

== Synopsis ==
The film follows the love story of Rakshit, portrayed by Vivek Jaitly, and Aanchal, played by Ganga Mamgai. Their seemingly perfect relationship takes an ominous turn when a mysterious third person emerges, determined to ensnare Aanchal in his own world. The identity and intentions of this enigmatic individual become a source of intrigue and suspense throughout the narrative.

== Cast ==
- Ganga Mamgai as Aanchal
- Vivek Jaitly as Rakshit
- Rituraj Singh as Shashtri
- Kaveri Priyam as Pooja
- Preeti Kochar as Rakshit's mother

== Production ==
Vash- Possessed by the Obsessed is produced by Ganga Mamgai under the banner of Twin Flame Production. Jagmeet Singh Samundri is the director, as well as the writer for the story, screenplay, and dialogues. The film's cinematography is handled by Manoj Shaw, while editing is done by Jagmeet Singh Samundri. The film's music is composed by Mukhtar Sahota, with lyrics penned by Ajay Garg. Notable singers such as Shalmali Khogode, Mohammad Irfan, Yasir Desai, Palak Muchhal, Pawani Pandey, and Sanhita Majumdar have lent their voices to the film's soundtrack. The music is released under the Zee Music company. The film was shot at various locations including Dharamshala and Manali. Vash- Possessed by the Obsessed is set to release on 21 July 2023 in theatres across India. The film's distribution is handled by Jai Viratra Entertainment Limited.
