= Maniben.com =

- Genre: Comedy
- Screenplay by: Nimesh Shah
- Directed by: Rajan Waghdhare
- Country of origin: India
- Original language: Hindi
- No. of seasons: 1
- No. of episodes: 220

Production
- Executive producer: Sujit J. Mahimkar
- Producer: Abhimanyu Singh
- Editor: Sanket Parker
- Production company: Contiloe Entertainment

Original release
- Network: SAB TV
- Release: 8 June 2009 – 24 June 2010

Maniben.com is an Indian Hindi-language comedy television series that aired on SAB TV from 8 June 2009 to 24 June 2010. Produced by Contiloe Pictures, the show was based on a Gujarati play of the same name.

== Plot ==
Maniben.com follows the story of Maniben Patel, a simple and down-to-earth woman from a middle-class background. Her life takes a dramatic turn when her husband, Jaman Patel, a successful diamond merchant, decides to move their family from their familiar surroundings in Bhuleshwar to the upscale and elite Peddar Road in Mumbai.

Maniben struggles to adapt to this newfound wealth and sophistication. Determined to fit in with her new social circle and not disappoint her husband, she embarks on a series of comical adventures. These include attempts to learn English, forays into fashion design with often outlandish results, and even participation in a Mrs. World competition.

Through her hilarious misadventures, Maniben remains true to her kind and good-natured self. While she may face ridicule from the more sophisticated members of her new community, her genuine nature and warm heart ultimately win them over. The series also explores the relationship between Maniben and Jaman, highlighting the contrast between their backgrounds but emphasizing their strong bond and love for each other.

== Cast ==
- Smriti Irani as Maniben Jamankumar Patel
- Nitin Vakharia as Jamankumar Patel
- Dolly Bindra as Pammi
- Sudha Shivpuri as Rimi's mother-in-law a.k.a. Baa
- Kurush Deboo as Dr. Goliwalla
- Manini De as Sunaina Jabanputra
- Dilip Rawal as Pranav Jabanputra
- Simple Kaul as Nikita
- Bijal Batavia as Rimi
- Anand Goradia as Rishi
- Dhawal Barbhaya

== See also ==
- List of Hindi Comedy Shows
