= Simple Kaul =

Indian television actress

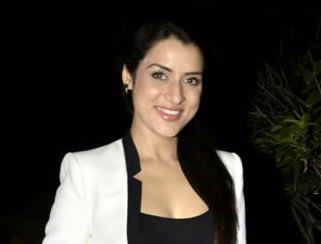
- Kaul in 2014
- Born: Mumbai, Maharashtra, India
- Occupation: Actress
- Years active: 2001–2022
- Known for: Shararat; Taarak Mehta Ka Ooltah Chashmah; Bhakharwadi; Ziddi Dil Maane Na
- Spouse: Rahul Loomba (m. 2010; div. 2025)

Simple Kaul is an Indian television actress who appeared in television series like Kutumb, Shararat, Taarak Mehta Ka Ooltah Chashmah, Oye Jassie, Yam Hain Hum, Dilli Wali Thakur Gurls and Ziddi Dil Maane Na.

== Early life ==
Simple Kaul was born in Mumbai, Maharashtra to Kashmiri parents from Srinagar. She learnt Hindustani classical music in her early years. She married Rahul Loomba in 2010. They got divorced in September 2025.

== Filmography ==
=== Television ===
| Year | Show | Role | Notes |
|---|---|---|---|
| 2002–2003 | Kkusum | Aastha Kanwar / Aastha Yash Deshmukh | |
| 2002–2003 | Kutumb | Pratham Mann's Younger Sister | |
| 2003–2006 | Shararat | Parminder "Pam" Sohni | |
| 2004–2005 | Ye Meri Life Hai | Reema | |
| 2004 | Khichdi | Manthara | |
| 2005 | Baa Bahoo Aur Baby | Malaika | |
| 2005 | Raat Hone Ko Hai | Sonia | |
| 2005–2006 | Sanya | Tanyashree Singh Agarwal | |
| 2006 | Twinkle Beauty Parlour Lajpat Nagar | Sameera | |
| 2006 | Aisa Des Hai Mera | Simi | |
| 2007–2008 | C.I.D. | Monali/Monisha | episode: "The Case of the Scandalous Murder" and "The Case of the Forgetful Girl" |
| 2007–2008 | Tujko Hai Salaam Zindgi | Roopa | |
| 2007–2009 | Teen Bahuraaniyaan | Nisha Jalan | |
| 2008–2010 | Jugni Chali Jalandhar | Jiya | |
| 2009 | Grihasti | | Cameo |
| 2009–2010 | Maniben.com | Nikita | |
| 2010–2012 | Saas Bina Sasural | Smita Lumba | |
| 2012–2013 | Taarak Mehta Ka Ooltah Chashmah | Gulabo | |
| 2013 | Suvreen Guggal – Topper of The Year | Ira | |
| 2013 | Oye Jassie | Reisha Malhotra | |
| 2013–2014 | Jeannie Aur Juju | Mooni | |
| 2014–2015 | Yam Hain Hum | Iravati Shobhavati | |
| 2015 | Dilli Wali Thakur Gurls | Neha | |
| 2016 | SuperCops Vs Super Villains | Komal | Guest |
| 2019 | Bhakharwadi | Komila | |
| 2021–2022 | Ziddi Dil Maane Na | Koel Roy Siddiqui | |
