= Shaleen Malhotra =

Anchor, Actor, Writer, Director, and Producer

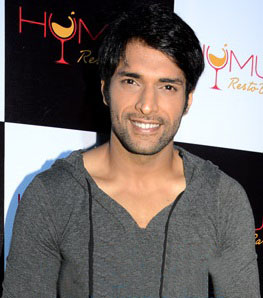
- Malhotra in 2017
- Born: Shaleen Malhotra; New Delhi, India
- Occupations: VJ, Actor, Director, Writer
- Years active: 2006 – present
- Notable work: Arjun, Ziddi Dil Maane Na
- Spouse: Diksha Rampal (m. 2014)

Shaleen Malhotra is an Indian VJ and television actor. He is known for his role Spl. Agent Karan Shergill in Sony SAB's drama series Ziddi Dil Maane Na. He made his television debut with Star Plus' crime based action show Arjun as ACP Arjun Suryakant Rawte which earned him recognition.

== Career ==
He was a contestant of the youth-based game show MTV Roadies (season 4) in 2006, and he has also hosted audition episodes of MTV Rockathon, Stunt Mania and MTV Roadies. He was also an on-air VJ for MTV. He has hosted Pyaar Tune Kya Kiya and Code RedTalaash.

Malhotra acted in Encounter, O Gujariya: Badlein Chal Duniya and Ishqbaaaz and appeared in episodes of Adaalat, Yeh Hai Aashiqui and Pyaar Tune Kya Kiya. In 2017, he was in the show Koi Laut Ke Aaya Hai as army officer Rajveer Malhotra, a self-righteous and ethical person.

He played the lead role of Yuvraj Chaudhary in Colors TV Show Laado – Veerpur Ki Mardani and also as Special Agent Karan Shergill in Sony SAB's Ziddi Dil Maane Na. He was last seen in the lead role of Yash Talwar in Sony Sab's show Vanshaj.

Malhotra ventured into direction with Seven and a Half Dates, India's first musical web-series. The series also marked his debut as a writer as well as a debut of his homegrown production house, Luck Films. The series debuted on Novice Records' YouTube Page. Since August 2026, he was signed Tegvir in Colors TV's 108 Base Hospital – Uri.

== Personal life ==
Shaleen Malhotra was born and brought up in New Delhi, India. His family is Punjabi. He is trained in parkour and kickboxing. Malhotra married his best friend, Diksha Rampal, a Delhi-based accessory designer on 4 June 2014.

== Filmography ==
=== Films ===
Year	Title	Role	Notes
2021	D Company	Manya Surve	Debut

=== Television ===
Year	Titular	Role	Notes
2011	Adaalat	Jamal Ahmed	
2012-2013	Arjun	ACP Arjun Suryakant Rawte	Title role
2014	Pyaar Tune Kya Kiya	Suraj	Season 1; Episode 4
2014	Encounter	Inspector Achal Kutthy	
2014	O Gujariya: Badlein Chal Duniya	Veer Pratap Singh	
2014	Box Cricket League 1	Captain of Pune Anmol Ratan	
2015	Code Red	Himself/host	38 episodes
2015	Pyaar Tune Kya Kiya Pyaar Tune Kya Kiya	Aparna's (unnamed) husband. Rudra. (sanchita's lover)	Season 3 episode 12 . Rudra in season 4 episode 10
2015	Bad Company	Himself/Guest	Season 1; Episode 8
2015	Bigg Boss 9	Himself/Guest	Day 21
2016	Box Cricket League 2	Contestant	
2016	Yeh Hai Aashiqui	Inspector Rajveer	Season 4; Episode 16
2016	Ishqbaaaz	Siddharth Vikram Rana	
2016	Pyaar Tune Kya Kiya	Himself/host	Season 8
2017	Koi Laut Ke Aaya Hai	Major Rajveer Malhotra	
2017-2018	Laado - Veerpur Ki Mardani	Yuvraj Gunwant Singh Choudhary:	Lead Role
2019	Kitchen Champion	Himself	Season 1; Episode 20
2020	Mere Dad Ki Dulhan	Rishi Burman	
2021–2022	Ziddi Dil Maane Na	Karan Shergill/Balli	Lead Role
2024	Vanshaj	Yash Shalini Talwar	Lead Role
2026	108 Base Hospital – Uri	Lt. Col. Teghbir Singh Sandhu	Cameo

=== Web series ===
Year	Title	Role	Notes
2020	Twisted 3	Neil D'Souza	Debut in Web
2021	Koi Hai	Inspector Rajesh	Season 1 Episode 2
2023	Lakhan Leela Bhargava	Karan Oberoi	Episode 19-21
2024	Checkmate	Param Shergill	Lead Role On Hungama Play
2026	Seven and a Half Dates	Writer, Director, Producer	YouTube
2026	The Suite Spot	Host, Director, Producer	YouTube
