= Jethalal Gada =

Fictional character

Jethalal Champaklal Gada
- Taarak Mehta Ka Ooltah Chashmah character
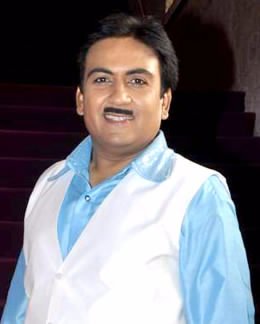
- Dilip Joshi as Jethalal Champaklal Gada
- First appearance: Taarak Mehta Ka Ooltah Chashmah
- Created by: Tarak Mehta
- Portrayed by: Dilip Joshi (2008–present)
- Voiced by: Rajesh Kava (Taarak Mehta Kka Chhota Chashmah, animated TV series)
- Spin-off: Taarak Mehta Kka Chhota Chashmah

In-universe information
- Full name: Jethalal Champaklal Gada
- Occupation: Businessman
- Relatives: Daya Jethalal Gada (wife); Tipendra "Tapu" Jethalal Gada (son); Champaklal Jayantilal Gada (father)
- Religion: Jainism
- Origin: Bhachau, Gujarat, India
- Nationality: Indian
- Home: Gokuldham Society
- Hometown: Mumbai, Maharashtra, India

Jethalal Champaklal Gada, also known as Jetha or Jethiya, is a fictional character from the television series Taarak Mehta Ka Ooltah Chashmah. He is a businessman who runs an electronic shop known as "Gada Electronics". Gada lives with his wife, Daya, their son Tapu and his father Champaklal. The character was created by Tarak Mehta and portrayed by Dilip Joshi.

Jethalal Champaklal Gada, portrayed by Dilip Joshi is a lovable businessman known for his unique quirks. His character emphasis community values and is known as a dutiful son. Gada's friendship with Taarak Mehta (played by Shailesh Lodha), and humorous interactions, especially with Babitaji (played by Munmun Dutta), Iyer (played by Tanuj Mahashabde) and Bhide (played by Mandar Chandwadkar), is a source of entertainment and comic relieve. Jethalal has become a popular character on Indian television.

== Development ==
Dilip Joshi known for his supporting parts in films and television series was cast as the Gujarati businessman, Jethalal Champaklal Gada. Dilip Joshi was originally considered for the role of Champaklal. The character of Jethalal was first offered to Jatin Kanakia, who also gave the idea for Taarak Mehta Ka Ooltah Chashma to the show's producer, Asit Modi. However, after Jatin Kanakia's death from cancer in 1999, the show's development was put on hold. Afterward, Asit Modi approached several actors, including Rajpal Yadav, Ali Asgar, Yogesh Tripathi and Ahsaan Qureshi, before finalising Joshi.

== Characterization ==
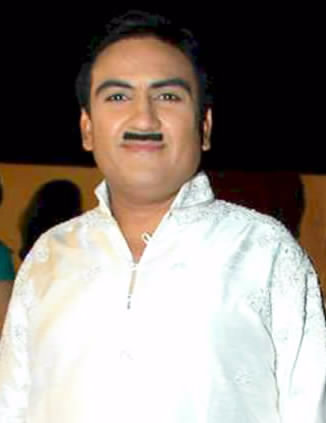
The character of Jethalal is also known for his different moustache and unique shirts designs.

Jethalal is shown as a Gujarati businessman who loves his family and respects his father. His relationship with his wife Daya, is a husband and wife's relationship filled with love, friendship and humour. Jethalal also shares a deep friendship with author Taarak Mehta, whom he calls his "fire brigade" because whenever he has a problem, he goes to him for a solution. He is a foodie and the Gujarati dishes like jalebi–fafda are his favourite. Jethalal always gets himself in many problems and troubles, ending up in comical circumstances.

== Legacy and influence ==
Joshi's portrayal of Jethalal has garnered significant acclaim, establishing him as a beloved character in Indian television. His performance has contributed to the show's longevity, making Jethalal one of the iconic characters in Indian sitcom history. Several publications like Mid Day and Times Now term Jethalal among the "most iconic characters" of Indian television. Critic Vineeta Kumar noted, "Jethalal is relatable, funny, interesting and curious – everything a character needs to ensures entertainment. Though he is a successful businessman and has a happy loving family, what intrigues is his vulnerability to get into trouble."

Joshi's on-screen pairing with Disha Vakani has also contributed to the character's popularity. In November 2023, the character was emerged as the "most popular fictional character on Hindi television" in Ormax Characters India Loves list. Pinkvilla placed the character first in its list of TV's 7 most iconic characters, with Pinkvilla describing Jethalal as one of the most relatable characters in the history of Indian television. The popularity of the show and the character has established Joshi among the highest paid and most popular actors of Hindi television.

== In other media ==
In 2023 Neela Films, the production house of the show, launched Run Jetha Run, a mobile game based on the character Jethalal Champaklal Gada, after investing a noteworthy sum of ₹24 crore into the gaming platform. The game surpassed one million downloads on Google Play and the Apple App Store and features Jethalal as a plucky hero who must navigate treacherous terrain, avoid obstacles, and collect coins to unlock new levels and characters.
