= Tipendra Jethalal Gada =

Fictional character

- Taarak Mehta Ka Ooltah Chashmah character
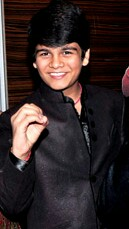
- Bhavya Gandhi as Tipendra Jethalal Gada
- First appearance: Taarak Mehta Ka Ooltah Chashmah
- Created by: Tarak Mehta
- Portrayed by: Bhavya Gandhi (2008–2017); Raj Anadkat (2017–2022); Nitish Bhaluni (2023–present)
- Voiced by: Aditya Pednekar (Taarak Mehta Kka Chhota Chashmah, animated TV series)
- Spin-off: Taarak Mehta Kka Chhota Chashmah

In-universe information
- Full name: Tipendra Jethalal Champaklal Gada
- Family: Daya Jethalal Gada (mother); Jethalal Champaklal Gada (father)
- Religion: Jainism
- Origin: Bhachau, Gujarat, India
- Nationality: Indian
- Home: Gokuldham Society
- Hometown: Mumbai, Maharashtra, India

Tipendra Jethalal Gada also known as Tapu, is a fictional character from the television series Taarak Mehta Ka Ooltah Chashmah. He is a college student and is the leader of "Tapu Sena". Tapu lives in the society with his mother Daya, father Jethalal and grandfather Champaklal Gada. The character was created by Tarak Mehta and originally portrayed by Bhavya Gandhi.

== Development ==
Bhavya Gandhi was selected as Tapu by Asit Kumarr Modi, after he auditioned around 400-500 kids. Gandhi's cricket skills helped him land the role. Gandhi played Tapu from 2008 to 2017, for 9 years. Raj Anadkat played Tapu from 2017 to 2022, for 5 years. Since 2023, Tapu is played by Nitish Bhaluni.

== Influence ==
Tapu's character is known as the smartest and naughtiest kid of the society. He is the leader of the "Tapu Sena", that include other children of the society (mainly Sonu, Goli, Gogi and Pinku). His friendship with the Tapu Sena, and interaction with Bhide (played by Mandar Chandwadkar), is a source of entertainment and comic relief. Tapu has often given innovative ideas during several celebrations in the society and under difficult circumstances.

== In other media ==
In 2023 Neela Films, the production house of the show, launched "Tappu FreeKick Challenge" and "Tappu Skating Adventure", mobile games based on the character Tapu, after investing a noteworthy sum of ₹24 crore into the gaming platform.

== Naming of the Name "Tapu" ==
It was mentioned in one of the Episodes of Taarak Mehta Ka Ooltah Chashmah (episode 487) that the name "Tapu" was long thought by his grandmother, even before the marriage of Jethalal and Daya

== See also ==
- Garha, a Jain caste
- Bhavya Gandhi
