= Daya Jethalal Gada =

Fictional character

- Taarak Mehta Ka Ooltah Chashmah character
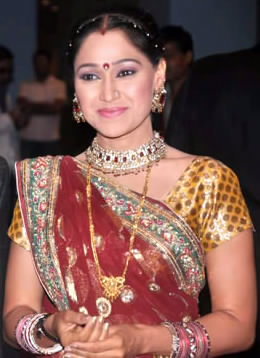
- Disha Vakani as Daya Jethalal Gada
- First appearance: Taarak Mehta Ka Ooltah Chashmah
- Created by: Tarak Mehta
- Portrayed by: Disha Vakani (2008–2017, 2018; 2019)
- Voiced by: Bhoomika Jain (Taarak Mehta Kka Chhota Chashmah, animated TV series)
- Spin-off: Taarak Mehta Kka Chhota Chashmah

In-universe information
- Full name: Daya Jethalal Gada
- Aliases: Daya "Tapu ke Papa" Gada; Garba Queen
- Occupation: Homemaker
- Relatives: Jethalal Gada (husband); Tipendra "Tapu" Jethalal Gada (son); Sundar (brother); Champaklal Jayantilal Gada (father-in-law)
- Religion: Jainism
- Origin: Ahmedabad, Gujarat, India
- Nationality: Indian
- Home: Gokuldham Society
- Hometown: Mumbai, Maharashtra, India

Daya Jethalal Gada also known as Dayaben, is a fictional character from the television series Taarak Mehta Ka Ooltah Chashmah. Daya is married to businessman Jethalal Gada and is among the central characters of the series. She lives with her husband and their son Tipendra, affectionately known as Tapu. The character was created by Tarak Mehta and portrayed by Disha Vakani.

Daya Jethalal Gada, portrayed by Disha Vakani is a lovable homemaker known for her unique quirks, innocence and cooking skills. Her character emphasis community values and is known as a dutiful mother and wife. Daya is popularly referred to as "Garba Queen", and has become a popular character on Indian television. Her catchphrases "Hey Maa Mata Ji" and "Aee Halo" are popular too.

== Development ==
Disha Vakani, known for her supporting parts in films and for her Gujarati plays was cast as the Gujarati homemaker, Daya Jethalal Gada. Disha played the character from 2008 to 2017. She took a maternity leave in 2017, but then decided to leave the show. As of 2024, the character of Daya has an open exit, since Vakani was not replaced by Asit Kumarr Modi. However, in 2018 and in 2019, Vakani played Daya for two special episodes.

== Characterization ==
Daya is shown as a Gujarati homemaker who loves her family and is deeply traditional. Her relationship with her husband Jethalal, is a husband and wife's relationship filled with love, friendship and humour. She shares a quirky relationship with her brother Sundar Lal (played by her real brother, Mayur Vakani). Daya's character also possesses a collection of Gujarati sarees and heavy jewellers. Her friendship with Anjali (played by Neha Mehta), and interactions with Sundar and her mother, Jeevdaya, is a source of entertainment and comic relief. Daya is also known for her dance and is popularly called as the "Garba Queen" of Ahmedabad. Her cooking traditional dishes, reflects the rich cultural heritage of Gujarat and resonates with viewers.

== Legacy and influence ==
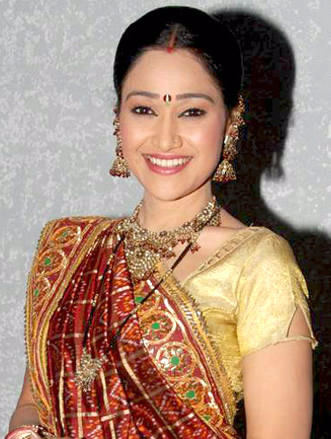
Daya's saree collection is a distinctive feature of the character.

Vakani's portrayal of Daya has garnered significant acclaim, establishing her as a beloved character in Indian television. Her performance has contributed to the show's longevity, making Daya one of the iconic characters in Indian sitcom history. Despite Vakani leaving the show, her portrayal remain irreplaceable. Vakani's on-screen pairing with Dilip Joshi has garnered significant attention, with fans frequently expressing their admiration for the couple.

Writing for Times of India, Navya Malini said, "There are a number of reasons why Daya has become a household name among the Hindi TV viewers. Consistency, dedication and attention to different layers of characteristion have enabled Disha retain the innocence of Daya." Several publications like Pinkvilla, Zee News, Times Now and ScoopWhoop term Daya among the "most iconic characters" of Indian television.

== In other media ==
In 2023 Neela Films, the production house of the show, launched mobile game, after investing a noteworthy sum of ₹24 crore into the gaming platform. The character of Daya is a part of the games "Daya Match Pool" and "Run Jetha Run" among others.

== See also ==
- Gada
- Disha Vakani
