= Nickelodeon Kids' Choice Awards India =

Awards show

- Country: India
- Presented by: Viacom 18; Nickelodeon
- Reward: KCA Blimp
- First award: 14 November 2013
- Final award: ongoing
- Website: http://www.nickindia.com/kcaindia

Television/radio coverage
- Network: Nickelodeon
- Runtime: 80 - 100 minutes

The Nickelodeon Kids' Choice Awards India is the Indian version of the American awards show set to recognize Indian Film, TV, Music and Sports. An adaptation of the US version, the Indian edition is licensed and produced by Viacom 18 Media Pvt. Limited.

The event was first held in Mumbai on 14 November 2013.. The Host was Kapil Sharma. The next edition of the event was held on 22 March 2015. The host of the 2015 edition was Manish Paul. Jay Sean, created the KCA jingle which complimented core ideology of empowering kids and having whole lot of fun. The third edition was held on 1 January 2017. The hosts of this edition was Manish Paul and Nihar. The fourth edition was held on 1 January 2018. The hosts of this edition were Rithvik Dhanjani and Bharti Singh.

== Categories ==
=== Films ===
- Favourite Movie Actor (2013, 2015 and (2013, 2015 and 2016)
- Favourite Song (2013, 2015 and 2016)
- Favourite Dancing Star (2013 and 2016)

=== Sports ===
- Favourite Icon Of The Year (2013)

=== Other ===
- Favourite Child Entertainer (2013, 2015 and 2016)
- Favourite Indian Cartoon Character (2015 and 2016)

== List of Winners ==
=== 2013 ===
Favorite Movie Actor	Favorite Movie Actress
Salman Khan - Ek Tha Tiger	Katrina Kaif - Ek Tha Tiger
Favorite Movie	Favorite International Movie
Dabangg 2	Avengers
Favorite TV Actor	Favorite TV Actress
Dilip Joshi - Taarak Mehta Ka Ooltah Chashmah	Disha Vakani - Taarak Mehta Ka Ooltah Chashmah
Favorite TV Series	Favorite Show on Kids Channel
Taarak Mehta Ka Ooltah Chashmah	Doraemon - Hungama TV
Favorite Dancing Star
Varun Dhawan
Favorite Sports Icon
Sachin Tendulkar

=== 2016 ===
Favorite Movie Actor	Favorite Movie Actress
Salman Khan - Sultan	Deepika Padukone - Bajirao Mastani
Favorite Movie	Favorite Mobile Game
Sultan	Temple Run
Favorite Song	Favorite Dancing Star
Kala Chashma - Baar Baar Dekho	Tiger Shroff
Favorite TV Character Male	Favorite TV Character Female
Kapil Sharma as Bittu Sharma - Comedy Nights with Kapil	Disha Vakani as Daya Gada - Taarak Mehta Ka Ooltah Chashmah
Favorite TV Series	Favorite Show on Kids Channel
Taarak Mehta Ka Ooltah Chashmah	Motu Patlu - Nickelodeon
Favorite Child Entertainer	Favorite Indian Cartoon Character
Bhavya Gandhi - Taarak Mehta Ka Ooltah Chashmah	Motu

=== 2017 ===
Favorite Movie Actor	Favorite Movie Actress
Ranveer Singh	Alia Bhatt
Favorite Movie	Favorite Song
Golmaal Again	Badri Ki Dulhaniya - Badrinath Ki Dulhania
Favorite TV Actor	Favorite TV Actress
Dilip Joshi - Taarak Mehta Ka Ooltah Chashmah	Disha Vakani - Taarak Mehta Ka Ooltah Chashmah
Favorite TV Series	Favorite Show on Kids Channel
Taarak Mehta Ka Ooltah Chashmah	Motu Patlu - Nickelodeon
Favorite Dancing Star	Favorite Child Entertainer
Varun Dhawan	Jayas Kumar - Sa Re Ga Ma Pa Li'l Champs 2017
Favorite Sports Icon
Mithali Raj

=== 2019 ===
Favorite Movie Actor	Favorite Movie Actress
Salman Khan	Shraddha Kapoor
Favorite Movie
Chhichhore
Favorite TV Actor	Favorite TV Actress
Dilip Joshi - Taarak Mehta Ka Ooltah Chashmah	Bharti Singh - Khatra Khatra Khatra
Favorite TV Series	Favorite Show on Kids Channel
Taarak Mehta Ka Ooltah Chashmah	Shinchan - Hungama TV
Favorite Dancing Star	Entertainer of the Year
Tiger Shroff	Kartik Aaryan
Newcomer of the Year	Rising Star of the Year
Siddhant Chaturvedi	Sara Ali Khan
Majedar Performer of the Year	Jodi Kamaal Ki
Varun Sharma	Taapsee Pannu & Bhumi Pednekar - Saand Ki Aankh

=== 2021 ===
Favorite Movie Actor	Favorite Movie Actress
Akshay Kumar	Kiara Advani
Favorite Movie	Favorite Song
Shershaah	Raatan Lambiyan - Shershaah
Favorite Actor (South)	Favorite Actress (South)
Allu Arjun	Rashmika Mandanna
Favorite South Movie	Favorite Dancing Star
Pushpa: The Rise	Nora Fatehi
Favorite TV Actor	Favorite TV Actress
Dilip Joshi	Bharti Singh
Favorite TV Series	Favorite Show on Kids Channel
Taarak Mehta Ka Ooltah Chashmah	Shinchan - Hungama TV
Favorite Cricketer	Favorite Sports Person
MS Dhoni	Neeraj Chopra
Favorite YouTube Artist	Favorite Instagram Celebrity
Ashish Chanchlani	Anushka Sen

=== 2022 ===
Favorite Movie Actor	Favorite Movie Actress
Kartik Aaryan	Shraddha Kapoor
Favorite Movie	Favorite Song
Pathaan	Kesariya - Brahmāstra
Favorite Actor (South)	Favorite Actress (South)
Vijay Sethupathi	Rashmika Mandanna
Favorite South Movie	Favorite Dancing Star
RRR	Nora Fatehi
Favorite TV Actor	Favorite TV Actress
Dilip Joshi	Bharti Singh
Favorite TV Series	Favorite Show on Kids Channel
Taarak Mehta Ka Ooltah Chashmah	Doraemon - Disney Channel
Favorite Cricketer	Favourite Rapper
Virat Kohli	Badshah

=== 2023 ===
Favorite Movie Actor	Favorite Movie Actress
Shah Rukh Khan	Kiara Advani
Favorite Movie	Favorite Movie (South)
Pathaan	KGF: Chapter 2
Favorite Actor (South)	Favorite Actress (South)
Yash	Rashmika Mandanna
Favorite TV Actor	Favorite TV Actress
Dilip Joshi	Rubina Dilaik
Favourite Bollywood Song	Favourite Song (South)
Kesariya - Brahmāstra: Part One – Shiva	Natu Natu - RRR
Favorite TV Series	Favorite Show on Kids Channel
Taarak Mehta Ka Ooltah Chashmah	Motu Patlu - Nickelodeon
Favorite Cricketer Male	Favorite Cricketer Female
Virat Kohli	Mithali Raj
Favourite Fashion Icon	Favourite Rapper
Diljit Dosanjh	Honey Singh
Favourite Dancing Star - Male	Favourite Dancing Star - Female
Hrithik Roshan	Madhuri Dixit

== Reception ==
Nick KCA 2013 India saw great success receiving over 1 lac votes for 12 categories in its maiden year.

== See also ==
- List of Asian television awards
