= Taarak Mehta Ka Ooltah Chashmah =

Indian sitcom television series

- Also known as: TMKOC
- Genre: Sitcom
- Created by: Asit Kumarr Modi
- Based on: Duniya Ne Undha Chashmah by Tarak Mehta
- Written by: Dialogues: Raju Odedra; Rajen Upadhyay; Mayank Vohra; Jitendra Parmar; Yogesh Mehraa; Manish Tiwari; Ashok Parmar
- Directed by: Dharmessh Mehta; Abhishek Sharma; Dheeraj Palshetkar; Harshad Joshi; Malav Suresh Rajda
- Starring: See below
- Narrated by: Shailesh Lodha (2008–2022); Sachin Shroff (2022–present)
- Opening theme: Taarak Mehta Ka Ooltah Chashmah
- Composer: Sunil Patni
- Country of origin: India
- Original language: Hindi
- No. of seasons: 1
- No. of episodes: 4,874

Production
- Producers: Asit Kumarr Modi; Neela Asit Modi
- Camera setup: Multi-camera
- Running time: 19–22 minutes
- Production company: Neela Film Productions

Original release
- Network: Sony SAB
- Release: 28 July 2008 – present

Related
- Taarak Mehta Ka Chhota Chashmah

Taarak Mehta Ka Ooltah Chashmah (lit. 'Taarak Mehta's Inverted Spectacles') often abbreviated as TMKOC, is an Indian sitcom based on the weekly column Duniya Ne Undha Chasma by Tarak Mehta for the magazine Chitralekha. Produced by Asit Kumarr Modi under Neela Film Productions, it is one of the longest-running Indian television series. The series premiered on 28 July 2008 on Sony SAB and is also digitally available on SonyLIV.

== Plot ==
The series is set in Mumbai and follows the lives of the residents of Gokuldham Co-operative Housing Society, a diverse community with people from different cultural and regional backgrounds.

Most storylines focus on an individual, a family, or sometimes the entire society as they encounter and resolve various problems. The characters frequently support one another and celebrate festivals together, highlighting their close-knit bond.

A recurring theme centers on Jethalal Champaklal Gada, who often finds himself in comical situations and troubles, with brief moments of relief before new challenges arise.

== Cast and characters ==
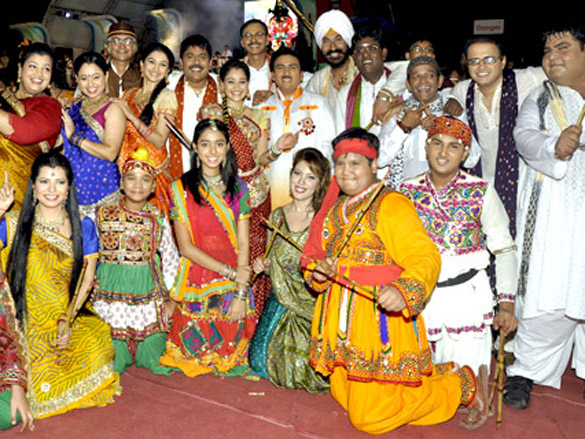
Main cast of TMKOC in 2011 celebrating Navaratri

=== Main ===
- Dilip Joshi as Jethalal "Jetha/Jethiya" Champaklal Gada: Champaklal's son; He runs Gada Electronics electronics shop. (2008–present)
- Disha Vakani as Daya Jethalal Gada: Jethalal's wife (2008–2017; 2018; 2019)
- Bhavya Gandhi as Tipendra "Tapu" Jethalal Gada: Jethalal and Daya's son (2008–2017)
  - Raj Anadkat replaced Gandhi as Tapu (2017–2022)
  - Nitish Bhaluni replaced Anadkat as Tapu (2023–present)
- Amit Bhatt as Champaklal Jayantilal Gada: Jethalal's father (2008–present).
  - Bhatt also portrayed Jayantilal Girdharlal Gada, Champaklal's father (2021)
- Shailesh Lodha as Taarak Mehta: A poet and writer by hobby and a trading company employee by profession (2008–2022)
  - Sachin Shroff replaced Lodha as Taarak. (2022–present)
- Neha Mehta as Anjali Taarak Mehta: Taarak's wife (2008–2020)
  - Sunayana Fozdar replaced Mehta as Anjali (2020–present)
- Tanuj Mahashabde as Krishnan Subramaniam Iyer: A scientist from Chennai. Babita's husband (2008–present)
- Munmun Dutta as Babita Krishnan Iyer: Iyer's wife; (2008–present)
- Mandar Chandwadkar as Aatmaram Tukaram Bhide: A tuition teacher from Ratnagiri, Maharashtra and secretary of Gokuldham Society. Madhavi's husband; Sonu's father (2008–present)
- Sonalika Joshi as Madhavi Aatmaram Bhide: Aatmaram's wife; runs an Achar & Papad Business (2008–present)
- Jheel Mehta as Sonalika "Sonu" Aatmaram Bhide: Aatmaram and Madhavi's daughter (2008–2012)
  - Nidhi Bhanushali replaced Mehta as Sonu (2012–2019)
  - Palak Sindhwani replaced Bhanushali as Sonu (2019–2024)
  - Khushi Mali replaced Sindhwani as Sonu (2024–present)
- Gurucharan Singh as Roshan Singh Harjeet Singh Sodhi; Roshan's husband; Gogi's father: He owns a garage. (2008–2013; 2014–2020)
  - Laad Singh Maan replaced Singh as Sodhi, but later Singh returned as Sodhi. (2013–2014)
  - Balwinder Singh Suri replaced Gurucharan Singh as Sodhi. (2020–present)
    - Suri also portrayed Balvinder "Ballu" Singh Suri; Sodhi's friend (2019)
- Jennifer Mistry Bansiwal as Roshan Kaur Sodhi: Roshan Singh's wife; Gogi's mother. She is a Parsi from Navsari, who had a love marriage with Roshan Singh. (2008–2013; 2016–2023)
  - Dilkhush Reporter replaced Jennifer as Roshan but later Jennifer returned in 2016. (2013–2016)
  - Monaz Mevawalla replaced Jennifer as Roshan (2023–present)
- Samay Shah as Gurcharan "Gogi" Singh Roshan Singh Sodhi: Roshan Singh and Roshan Kaur's son and the youngest member of Tapu Sena (2008–present)
- Nirmal Soni as Dr. Hansraj Baldevraj Hathi: An overweight doctor; Komal's husband; Goli's father. His catchphrase is sahi baat hai (that's right). (2008; 2018–present)
  - Kavi Kumar Azad replaced Nirmal Soni as Dr. Hathi (2008–2018)
  - Soni also portrayed Dr. Vanraj Hathi, Dr. Hansraj Hathi's younger brother (2009–2011)
- Ambika Ranjankar as Komal Hansraj Hathi: Dr. Hathi's wife; Goli's mother (2008–present)
- Kush Shah as Gulab Kumar "Goli" Hansraj Hathi: Hansraj and Komal's son (2008–2024)
  - Dharmit Turakhiya replaced Kush Shah as Goli. (2024–present)
- Shyam Pathak as Popatlal "Popu/Popat" Bhagwati Prasad Pandey: He is commonly known as Patarkaar Popatlal, born in Bhopal, Madhya Pradesh, he works as a senior crime reporter and digital edition head in the Toofan Express newspaper. (2009–present)
- Azhar Shaikh as Pankaj "Pinku" Diwan Sahay: The oldest member of Tapu Sena, who initially lived in Gokuldham Society but later shifted to the neighboring Gulmohar Society. (2008–present)
- Sharad Sankla as Abdul: Owner of a grocery shop All In One General Store (2008–present)
- Ghanashyam Nayak as Natwarlal "Nattu" Prabhashankar Undhaiwala: Hailing from Undhai Village, Gujarat, Nattu is Jethalal's employee who handles the accounts section of Gada Electronics. (2008–2021)
  - Kiran Bhatt replaced Nayak as Natwarlal after his death. (2022–present)
- Tanmay Vekaria as Bagheshwar "Bagha" Daddu Undhaiwala: Nattu's nephew; Bawri's fiancé and Jetha's employee (2011–present)
  - Vekaria also portrayed various characters (2008–2009)
- Kuldeep Gor as Ratan Singh Chatur Singh Binjola: Businessman from Rajasthan (2025–present)
- Dharti Bhatt as Rupmati "Rupa" Baditop Ratan Singh Binjola: Ratan Singh's wife (2025–present)
- Akshaan Sherawat as Veer Ratan Singh Binjola: Ratan and Rupa's son, Bansari's brother (2025–present)
- Maahi Bhadra as Bansari Ratan Singh Binjola: Daughter of Ratan and Rupa, Veer's sister (2025–present)

=== Recurring ===
- Priya Ahuja as Rita Shrivastav: She is commonly known as Rita Reporter, a reporter in Kal Tak news channel, a rival of "Toofan Express" in which Popatlal works. (2008; 2009–2010; 2013–2022)
  - Nidhi Nautiyal replaced Ahuja as Rita. Ahuja was again cast in the role after Nautiyal left the show. (2010–2012)
  - Ramsha Farooqui replaced Ahuja as Rita (2023–2024)
  - Ami Joshi replaced Farooqui as Rita (2024–2025)
  - Dipti Kashyap replaced Joshi as Rita (2025)
  - Minal Jadeja replaced Kashyap as Rita (2026–present)
- Anil Yadav as Matka King Mohanlal: Resident in Gokuldham Society (2008–2009)
- Mayur Vakani as Sundar Lal: Daya's brother (2008–present)
- Yash Patel as Magan, a worker at Gada Electronics (2008–present)
- Daya Shankar Pandey as Inspector Chalu Pandey: A police officer in Mumbai Police (2010–present)
  - Pandey also appeared as himself (2010)
- Rajshekhar Chandran as Constable Chandrashekhar Patil: Hawaldar, Inspector Chalu Pandey's assistant (2010–present)
- Kanti Joshi as Baka: Sundar's friend (2010–2021, 2023–present)
- Monika Bhadoriya as Bawri Dhondulal Kanpuria: Bagha's fiancée and love interest (2013–2019)
  - Navina Wadekar replaced Bhadoriya as Bawri (2023–present)
    - Wadekar also portrayed Dolly. (2022)
- Jatin Bajaj as Bhailu: Sundar's friend (2014–present)
- Kamal Ghimiray as Shubhankar Banerjee: Iyer's boss from a Bengali background (2019–2021)
- Rakesh Bedi as Babulal Chhedilal Mitha: Taarak's short-tempered and arrogant boss who often asks Mehta to do his own work. (2020–present)
- Hardik Sangani as Moti: Employee at Rupa Ratan Saree Center (2026–present)

== Production ==
=== Development ===
The producers initially approached the StarPlus and Zee TV channels, to host the series. However, when they rejected their offer, Sony SAB decided to accept the script.

When the series completed 1,000 episodes on 6 November 2012, Asit Kumarr Modi stated that it took eight years for the show to finally be aired:

"Originally, it was a column in a Gujarati magazine, and I bought its rights in 2001. I approached every channel, but the trend of daily soaps had just started, and saas-bahu shows dominated the scene. Whoever I approached said there was no scope for comedy every day. But I had a feeling that one-day comedies, too, would become a daily trend. Finally, in 2008, Taarak Mehta... came on the air."

=== Filming ===
The filming for the series takes place in Film City in Mumbai. External filming for specific scenes has taken place in locations, for example: Gujarat, New Delhi, Goa and in overseas locations such as Leicester, London, Brussels, Paris, Hong Kong and Singapore.

From March to June 2020, filming shut down in the wake of the COVID-19 pandemic lockdown in India. During the same period, it was revealed that it was originally planned for two years and might have gone off-air in 2010 itself as stated by the original plan. The show started broadcasting its new episodes from 22 July 2020. In April 2021, due to the rise in COVID-19 cases, the Government of Maharashtra suspended the shooting of films and TV shows in the state. Because of this suspension, the show's shooting from April to July took place in Daman.

=== Dubbed versions ===
The series was also dubbed in Telugu as Tarak Mama Ayyo Rama for ETV Plus and Marathi as Gokuldhamchi Duniyadari for Fakt Marathi.

== Crossovers and special episodes ==
Joshi and Vakani appeared as Jethalal and Daya in another SAB TV sitcom Sajan Re Jhoot Mat Bolo in 2010.

In 2010, the cast of Khichdi made a special appearance to promote their film Khichdi: The Movie. In that same year, Indira Krishnan appeared as Krishnaben to promote her show Krishnaben Khakhrawala.

In the special episode "Anand Ka Safar", it paid tribute to Rajesh Khanna, airing in July 2012 in which the cast members danced to Khanna's songs. In the same year, Giaa Manek appeared as Jeannie to promote her show Jeannie Aur Juju.

Crossover episodes with C.I.D. named "Mahasangam" aired in July 2014 in which CID visits Gokuldham Society to solve a murder mystery case.

Sumeet Raghavan, Rupali Bhosale and Punit Talreja from Badi Doooor Se Aaye Hai appeared in an episode in 2015.

In December 2021, cast of Taarak Mehta Ka Ooltah Chashmah appeared in Kaun Banega Crorepati.

== Other media ==
=== Comics ===
Comics based on characters from the series were launched as part of the SAB Ke Comics series in 2014.

=== Spin-off ===
An animated series based on the characters of the Taarak Mehta Ka Ooltah Chashmah titled Taarak Mehta Kka Chhota Chashmah aired on Sony YAY! since 19 April 2021. It is also available on Netflix. A television film Tapu and the Big Fat Alien Wedding aired on 27 May 2022 on Sony YAY!.

== Reception ==
In the first week of 2017, the show stood in the fourth position with 6,004 TVT ratings. In the fourth week, it entered the top five and stood in fifth position with 6,059 TVT ratings. In March 2017, the show remained within the top five shows in the urban–rural metrics. From 19 to 25 June 2017, the show reached the top spot with 6,092 TVT ratings, before slipping to third position the following week with 6,049 TVT ratings. In the first week of 2018, it topped the charts with 6,961 TVT ratings.

From 14 to 20 October 2019, the show again secured the first position with 7,952 TVT ratings. Following the COVID-19 lockdown, from 13 to 19 July 2020, it returned as the number one show with 6,477 TVT ratings.

In May 2021, the series slipped to the last spot in the top-five TRP list, securing fifth position with 6,165 impressions.

In January 2025, the show recorded a 17% decline in ratings compared to the previous week, dropping from third position in Week 2 to eighth in Week 3, with a rating of 1.9. However, in June and July 2025, Taarak Mehta Ka Ooltah Chashmah experienced a resurgence, topping the TRP charts for four consecutive weeks (Weeks 24–27).

=== Criticism and response ===
The absence of original cast members, particularly Disha Vakani since 2017, has been noted, with fans suggesting it has impacted the show's humour.

== Legacy and impact ==
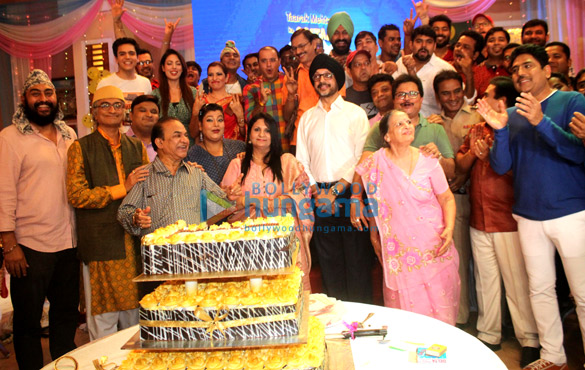
The cast of Taarak Mehta Ka Ooltah Chashmah, celebrating twelve years of the show, in 2020.

Taarak Mehta Ka Ooltah Chashmah is one of the longest-running television series in India and has gained national attention and developed a substantial following over the years, and is regarded as a cult classic and one of the greatest sitcoms in the history of Indian television. It completed 1000 episodes in November 2012, 2000 episodes in August 2016, 3000 episodes in September 2020 and 4000 episodes in February 2024.

In February 2015, Dilip Joshi, Disha Vakani, and Shailesh Lodha hosted the red carpet at the 60th Britannia Filmfare Awards to promote the Clean India campaign. In 2018, the Mudra Institute of Communications, Ahmedabad took up the show as a case study. It is also one of the most searched television series in India.

Decoding the reason behind Taarak Mehta Ka Ooltah Chashmah's success, Yashika Singla of The Print stated, "The major appeal of the television show is the idea of ethics and 'Indian values' at the very core of its scripts. To its credit, it also talked about a multitude of social issues and created awareness about them in its own light-hearted manner. It also had an age-inclusive cast that set it apart from other family dramas, beyond the confines of a typical female-audience focusing saas-bahu serial."

== Controversies ==
The show faced a controversy in 2020 when Neha Mehta left the show, stating that:

I do feel that in many areas discipline and decorum was not maintained on the sets.

In 2022, she claimed that producers of the show have not cleared her dues after leaving the show. Neela Film Productions issued a statement:

We consider our artist as our family. We have contacted Neha Mehta multiple times to complete the formalities with us. Unfortunately, she has been reluctant to sign the exit documents without which we cannot do a full and final settlement as per company policy. She also stopped responding to all our communication from past 2 years and she left the show without meeting us. We wish she would have replied to our emails instead of making false accusations about the makers that have given her 12 years of fame and career. We reserve our rights for appropriate action.

Shailesh Lodha left the show in 2022, and sued the makers of the show for being underpaid in 2023.

Jennifer Mistry Bansiwal quit the show in March 2023 accusing show producer Asit Kumarr Modi, executive producer Jatin Bajaj, and project head Sohail Ramani of sexual harassment.

In May 2023, Monika Bhadoriya accused Asit Kumarr Modi and project head Sohail Ramani of encouraging a hostile workplace. She further claimed that the producers have withheld the money of many artists. She also revealed that co-star Munmun Dutta argued frequently with producer Asit Kumarr Modi.

Palak Sidhwani, who portrayed Sonu Bhide accused the producers of exploiting her. The actor disclosed that she had received a legal notice from the production, alleging that she had breached her initial contract. In an interview with Bombay Times, Palak stated that she had chosen to leave the show for professional growth and health reasons. In response, the production house issued a statement claiming that Palak had violated several important rules in her exclusive artiste agreement. They alleged that she had engaged in unauthorized third-party endorsements and appearances without obtaining the necessary written consent. Palak, however, denied these allegations, asserting that she had informed the production house of her decision to quit well in advance and had followed the proper procedures.

== Awards ==
=== Indian Television Academy Awards ===
Year	Category	Recipient(s)
2008	Best Actress-Comedy	Disha Vakani
2009	Best Actress-Comedy	Disha Vakani
2009	Best Serial–Comedy	Neela Tele Films Private Limited
2009	Best Serial-Comedy	Neela Tele Films Private Limited
2012	Best Actor-Comedy	Dilip Joshi
2013	The ITA Scroll Of Honour	Neela Tele Films Private Limited
2014	Best Actor-Comedy	Dilip Joshi
2014	Best Actress-Comedy	Disha Vakani
2015	Best Show – Comedy	Neela Tele Films Private Limited
2016	Best Serial- Comedy	Neela Tele Films Private Limited
2018	The ITA Special Mention for the longest running Comedy Serial	Neela Tele Films Private Limited
2020	Landmark – TV	Taarak Mehta Ka Ooltah Chashmah
2020	People's Choice Award Popular Actor – TV	Munmun Dutta
2023	Best Supporting Actress – Comedy-TV	Munmun Dutta

=== Indian Telly Awards ===
Year	Category	Recipient(s)
2009	Best Actor in a Comic Role (Male)	Dilip Joshi
2009	Best Actor in a Comic Role (Female)	Disha Vakani
2009	Best Sitcom	Neela Tele Films Private Limited
2009	Best Sitcom Writer	Raju Odedra and Rajen Upadhyay
2010	Most Popular Actor in a Comic Role (Male)	Dilip Joshi
2010	Most Popular Actor in a Comic Role (Female)	Disha Vakani
2010	Most Popular Child Artist (Male)	Bhavya Gandhi
2010	Best Sitcom	Neela Tele Films Private Limited
2010	Best Sitcom Writer	Raju Odedra and Rajen Upadhyay
2012	Most Popular Actor in a Comic Role (Male)	Dilip Joshi
2012	Best Actress in a Comic Role (Jury)	Disha Vakani
2012	Best Sitcom	Neela Tele Films Private Limited
2013	Actress in a Comic Role (Jury)	Disha Vakani
2013	Best Director (Sitcom)	Harshad Joshi and Malav Rajda
2013	Most Popular Actor in a Comic Role	Dilip Joshi
2013	Best Sitcom / Comedy Program	Neela Tele Films Private Limited
2019	Best Actor in a Comic Role	Dilip Joshi
2019	Best Sitcom / Comedy Program	Neela Tele Films Private Limited
2019	Best Ensemble Fiction	Taarak Mehta Ka Ooltah Chashmah

=== Nickelodeon Kids' Choice Awards India ===
Year	Category	Recipient(s)
2013	Favorite TV Series	Taarak Mehta Ka Ooltah Chashmah
2013	Favorite TV Actor	Dilip Joshi
2013	Favorite TV Actress	Disha Vakani
2016	Favorite TV Series	Taarak Mehta Ka Ooltah Chashmah
2016	Favorite TV Character Female	Disha Vakani
2016	Favorite Child Entertainer	Bhavya Gandhi
2017	Favorite TV Series	Taarak Mehta Ka Ooltah Chashmah
2017	Favorite TV Actor	Dilip Joshi
2017	Favorite TV Actress	Disha Vakani
2019	Favorite TV Series	Taarak Mehta Ka Ooltah Chashmah
2019	Favorite TV Actor	Dilip Joshi
2021	Favorite TV Series	Taarak Mehta Ka Ooltah Chashmah
2021	Favorite TV Actor	Dilip Joshi
2022	Favorite TV Series	Taarak Mehta Ka Ooltah Chashmah
2022	Favorite TV Actor	Dilip Joshi
2023	Favorite TV Series	Taarak Mehta Ka Ooltah Chashmah
2023	Favorite TV Actor	Dilip Joshi

=== Star Guild Awards ===
Year	Category	Recipient(s)
2011	Best Actor in a Drama Series	Dilip Joshi
2013	Best Comedy Series	Neela Tele Films Private Limited

== See also ==
- List of Hindi comedy shows
- List of programmes broadcast by Sony SAB
