= List of Khichdi episodes =

Khichdi is an Indian comedy franchise produced by UTV Software Communications in association with Hats Off Productions. The first season originally aired on STAR Plus from 10 September 2002 to 10 July 2004. Khichdi follows the story of a Gujarati family called Parekhs, who live in an old mansion. The joint family encounters many typically Indian situations, but they try to solve it in the most atypical fashion imaginable. This is a funny bunch of people that is firmly united in their movement to get separated. They want to sell their ancestral property and move out and form their own nuclear families. But the head of their family does not agree. The show had reruns over Star Utsav and is available for free streaming on Hotstar.

== Episodes ==
No.	Title	Original release date
1	"Mohan Niwas"	10 September 2002
Tulsidas is furious when Raju informs him that India has lost in the cricket match. Later, Jayshree instigates Tulsidas against Hansa. Meanwhile, Heera is unhappy about Tulsidas’s decision to get her and Mira married.
2	"Heera Locks Herself in the Bathroom"	17 September 2002
Bhavesh Kumar comes home to see Heera, but she locks herself inside the bathroom and refuses to come out. Later, when Jayshree informs Tulsidas about Heera’s odd behaviour, he remembers Mira's thoughts about marriage that she is ready to marry anyone and decides to get her married to Bhavesh, instead of Heera.
3	"Bhavesh Agrees to Marry Mira"	24 September 2002
Tulsidas asks Mira to marry Bhavesh Kumar, which she agrees. Bhavesh too agrees to the proposal. Jayshree and Hansa are happy about the marriage only because, Tulsidas will have to sell the house to arrange money for Mira’s wedding. But Tulsidas instead asks Praful and Raju to help him with the necessary financial arrangements.
4	"Shagun Ceremony"	1 October 2002
When Bhavesh Kumar arrives at Tulsidas’ house for the Shagun ceremony, the latter asks him about the dowry requirement, which angers Bhavesh. Meanwhile, Praful continuously irritates Bhavesh. The family members discuss the preparations for Mira’s wedding.
5	"Mehendi"	8 October 2002
Godavari Masi who have come from London forbids Jayshree from applying mehendi, only because she is a widow. It hurts everyone including Tulsidas. The family members argue with Godavari over it and then retaliate and decide to not apply mehendi on their hands either.
6	"The Wedding"	15 October 2002
Jayshree, Raju, Praful and Hansa want to make Tulsidas cry after the wedding, which he has refused to do. On the wedding day, when the groom’s procession arrives, Tulsidas and Praful greet them. However, Bhavesh falls down unconscious. Later, the wedding takes place.
7	"Tulsidas Misunderstands Jayshree"	22 October 2002
After Mira’s wedding, Tulsidas gets nostalgic recollecting her childhood. Jayshree who has saved some money from Tulsidas only for the emergency condition tells Hansa about it, which she misinterpretes and tells Praful, who tells it to Tulsidas. Annoyed Tulsidas scolds Jayashree. This hurts Jayashree and she leaves the house for her parents' home.
8	"Jayshree Returns Home"	29 October 2002
The family is delighted after Jayshree returns home. Tulisdas apologises to Jayshree for misunderstanding her. Later, a ceiling fan falls on Tiwariben and she gets hurt. Praful assumes that she has died and arranges for her funeral. Jayshree and Hansa are pretty sure that now, Tulsidas will have to sell the house as it has been getting ruined. However, Tiwariben regains consciousness.
9	"Melissa Comes Home as the Tutor"	5 November 2002
Melissa comes home as the tutor Jayshree tells Tulsidas about the need to appoint a tuition teacher. However, he gets angry when she informs him that Melissa has volunteered to tutor them. Later, the family convince him to appoint Melissa as the tutor.
10	"Raju's Marriage is not a Secret"	12 November 2002
When the priest informs the family about Raju’s marriage plans that it would be a love marriage, Tulsidas is angry. However, Hansa and Jayshree gossip about Raju's plans for a love marriage.
11	"Tulsidas Asks Melissa to Leave"	19 November 2002
Raju tells the family that he loves Melissa and will only marry her. Later, Jayshree assures Raju that she will convince Tulsidas to accept Melissa. However, she instigates Tulsidas against Raju. A furious Tulsidas asks Melissa to leave the house.
12	"Peter Tries to Kill Tulsidas"	26 November 2002
Peter wants to kill Tulsidas, after he expelled Melissa from the house. Tulsidas informs Tiwariben about Raju’s relationship with Melissa. Later, Raju threatens to commit suicide if Tulsidas stops him from marrying Melissa.
13	"Tiwariben Visits Melissa"	3 December 2002
When Raju locks himself in the kitchen and threatens to commit suicide, Chakki mimics Melissa’s voice so that he will come out. Later, he argues with Tulsidas and declares that he will only marry Melissa. Meanwhile, Tiwariben decides to meet Melissa’s parents.
14	"Tiwariben Supports Raju"	10 December 2002
Tiwariben decides to take Raju's side. However, Tulsidas decides to separate them. He puts forth a few conditions for the marriage. Melissa gets irritated when Tulsidas asks her to change her religion in order to marry Raju.
15	"Raju Accuses Jayshree"	17 December 2002
Jayshree and Hansa think that they will be able to divide the property if Tulsidas gets imprisoned for killing Mellisa. Meanwhile, Raju blames Jayshree for her husband’s death, but apologises later. Jayshree decides to convince Tulsidas about Raju and Melissa’s marriage.
16	"Tulsidas Realises His Mistake"	24 December 2002
Jayshree confronts Tulsidas about the condition he put forth for the wedding. She argues that if he cannot adjust with the slightest alteration in his daily routine, he has no right to expect Melissa to change her religion. Tulsidas realises his mistake and accepts Melissa as his daughter-in-law.
17	"Raju Marries Melissa"	31 December 2002
Bhavesh and Praful tease Raju when he gets nervous about his wedding. Later, Raju marries Melissa. During the Graha Pravesh, Melissa kicks the Kalash and finds that it is stuck to the ground.
18	"Jacky & Chakki Go Missing"	7 January 2003
Jayshree finds that Jacky and Chakki are missing from the house. Later, Praful finds Jacky performing mimicry in front of a crowd while Chakki collects money from the onlookers. When they are brought home, the children reveal that they wanted the money to give Raju and Melissa a surprise party.
19	"Tulsidas Agrees to Dance"	14 January 2003
Jayshree pretends to be sick and convinces Tulsidas to dance with the kids for a competition. Tulsidas and the kids begin to practice. Meanwhile, a thief enters the kitchen and Tulsidas hurts his leg while chasing him. Despite the pain, he decides to take part in the competition.
20	"The Dance Competition"	21 January 2003
After the dance performance, Tulsidas falls down. Meanwhile, Tulsidas, Jacky and Chakki are announced as the winners and are gifted an apartment. However, Chakki and Jacky request Tulsidas to give away the prize to the second prize winners as they are homeless.
21	"The Family Goes on Hunger Strike"	28 January 2003
When Hansa is asked to cook for the family, she pretends to have a leg cramp. Later Jayashree sees her dancing with Praful. The family decides to go on a hunger strike until Hansa cooks a meal. However, Hansa brings food from a restaurant.
22	"Praful Tries to Impress Tulsidas"	4 February 2003
Tulsidas appreciates Raju when his photo gets published in the newspaper. He insults Praful for his foolishness. Aggrieved, Hansa asks Praful to do something to get his picture in the newspaper. Praful tells Tulsidas that he will be addressing his office’s annual day celebration.
23	"Jayshree Fails to Create a Rift"	11 February 2003
Melissa learns that Praful and Hansa have never fought with each other. With just a week away from their twelfth anniversary, Jayshree vows to Melissa that she will make the couple fight. Jayshree tries to create misunderstandings between them.
24	"Tulsidas Decides to Help the Kids"	18 February 2003
The cable connections gets cut as Praful pays the laundry bill instead of the cable TV bill. Jacky and Chakki are worried as their parents had planned to watch an award ceremony. When they tell Tulsidas, he decides to help them and sends the family for an outing.
25	"Melissa and the Kids Hatch a Plan"	25 February 2003
Chakki and Jacky trigger a conflict between Hansa and Jayshree. The two wives try to outsmart each other, but fail in their attempts. With Melissa’s help, the children hatch a plan.
26	"Jacky Learns a Lesson"	4 March 2003
Chakki and Jacky inform Jayshree that they have invited a friend, Rohan, to the house. Rohan comes along with his aunt, Shweta, a television actress. Jacky feels that his mother is inferior to Shweta. However, Jayshree and Shweta make him realise that every profession has its importance. Guest Stars: Shweta Tiwari as herself.
27	"Jacky has a Weird Dream"	11 March 2003
When Jacky wishes to become an adult, a miracle occurs. However, when the Parekh family finds Jacky missing, they presume that the new Jacky kidnapped their child. They call up the police and get him arrested. Finally, Jacky wakes up from his sleep and realises it was a dream.
28	"Parekhs Celebrate Holi"	18 March 2003
Melissa is scared to celebrate holi and decides to leave for her maternal home. Praful foils Jacky’s attempt to stop her. Tulsidas pretends to suffer from a heart attack and tells that he wishes to see everyone in the family celebrating Holi.
29	"Confusion in the Family"	25 March 2003
Tulsidas invites a saint to make Praful wiser. The saint tells a magic script, which can swap two souls. Jacky decides to use it on his teacher, but by mistake, swaps the souls of Tulsidas and Hansa. Jacky once again reads it wrong, and ends up swapping everyone’s souls.
30	"Jacky Plays a Prank"	1 April 2003
Jayshree asks Tulsidas to take care of Jacky as she is leaving for her uncle’s house. However, Jacky gets injured while playing and loses his memory. Tulsidas gets scared to face Jayshree. Later, Jacky reveals to Jayshree that he played a prank as it was April Fools’ Day.
31	"Parents-Students Day"	8 April 2003
Jacky and Chakki vow to win a competition on Parents-Students day. The Parekh family prepares a scene from the Mahabharat. However, Praful creates confusions and the play becomes comical. Nevertheless, the audience appreciates the play.
32	"Parekhs Plan a Trip"	15 April 2003
The Parekh family plans a trip to a resort. However, the vehicle stops in the middle of a forest as the fuel runs out. Meanwhile, a thief robs Tulsidas and Bhavesh’s clothes and ties them to a tree. Later, Chakkki gets lost in the forest.
33	"A Stranger Saves Chakki"	22 March 2003
Chakki meets a stranger in the forest. When the Parekhs reach the resort, they realise that Chakki is missing. Raju goes in search of her, but fails to find her. Later, they spot Chakki with the stranger and assume that he is a kidnapper.
34	"Jayshree Apologises to Jacky"	29 March 2003
Jayshree pressurises Jacky to study and vows to fast until he tops the class. However, Jacky falls ill. Later, Rekha informs Jayshree that Jacky had slept through the exams. Jayshree realises her mistake and apologises to Jacky. Rekha decides to give Jacky another chance to clear the exams.
35	"Oshi is Turned into a Donkey"	6 May 2003
Mr. Mehta asks Tulsidas to take care of his nephew Oshi. Oshi asks Praful to call his favourite magician. When the magician arrives, Tulsidas calls him a fool. In anger, the magician turns Oshi into a donkey.
36	"Tulsidas 'Murders' Jagan"	13 May 2003
While Tulsidas and Jacky play cricket, he sees Jagan and goes to hit him. Meanwhile, Jagan faints. The family thinks that Tulsidas killed Jagan and discuss how to conceal the murder. Later, the police come and arrest Tulsidas. Suddenly, Tulsidas wakes up and realises that it was a dream.
37	"Chakki's Birthday"	20 May 2003
Jayshree plans to organise a surprise party for Chakki on her birthday and lies to her that Hansa and Praful are planning a trip to Nainital. Upon learning this, Chakki gets angry as she wanted to give a surprise party to Hansa and Praful.
38	"Paranormal Activity"	27 May 2003
Raju brings Mayurakshi home. She plans to stay there until her sister’s wedding. Meanwhile, Chakki and Jacky call an innocent spirit to frighten Mayurakshi. Later, they tell her scary ghost stories. Tulsidas, meanwhile, pours paints on Praful, by mistake, and Mayurakshi gets scared.
39	"Jamun- The Astrologer"	3 June 2003
Jayshree calls an astrologer to make Bhavesh work. According to the astrologer’s instruction, Bhavesh starts a business. Later, Bhavesh brings home a few clients and Tulsidas becomes happy. However, his happiness is short lived. Find out why. Absent: Supriya Pathak as Hansa
40	"Jacky Realises the Value of Money"	10 June 2003
Jayshree wants Jacky to realise the value of money and decides to take him to Praful’s office. At the office, Praful and Jacky begin to play and an angry Jayshree tells Mr. Mehta about it. He threatens to dismiss Praful if he fails to meet the deadline. Absent: Supriya Pathak as Hansa
41	"The Teachers Go on a Strike"	17 June 2003
When Tulsidas and the family reach Chakki and Jacky’s school, they realise that the teachers are on strike and decide to teach the students. However, the students get fed up with their teaching and decide to support the teachers’ strike. Meanwhile, the principal and the staff withdraw the strike.
42	"Anmol Predicts Tulsidas' Death"	24 June 2003
Jacky wants Anmol to predict the future. Anmol foretells that Tulsidas and Praful will quarrel and a member of their family will die. Anmol tells Tulsidas to prepare for death. Jayashree saves Hansa from getting struck by a rickshaw, but the driver dies. Meanwhile, Tiwariben faints on seeing the body.
43	"Handbag Gets Hansa in Trouble"	1 July 2003
Hansa and Jayashree are glad that Himanshu wants Chikki to act in his film. The family discusses the story and title. Meanwhile, Tulsidas yells at Praful for buying lottery tickets instead of flight tickets. The family rushes to the airport. Later, a lady drops a purse into Hansa’s handbag. Note: First appearance of Jamnadas Majethia as Himanshu.
44	"Stranger Snatches Hansa's Handbag"	8 July 2003
Tulsidas and his family board the plane to Dubai. The family enjoys sightseeing in Dubai. A stranger snatches Hansa’s handbag, in which a lady had dropped a purse. Hansa refuses to leave the place until she gets her handbag back.
45	"Thief Searches for Diamonds"	15 July 2003
The thief searches the handbag for diamonds. Later, Praful meets the thief and seeks his help in finding the flower for his wife, and tells him about the missing purse. The thief comes to the hotel to pick up the handbag. Raju identifies him while the thief shoots at him.
46	"Hansa Goes Missing"	22 July 2003
Bhavesh pretends getting shot and faints. The thief informs Mantra that there is no necklace in the bag. Meanwhile, Himanshu directs a film in which Tulsidas acts as a beggar. Jayashree insists Melissa accompany her on the water slide. Hansa and Melissa go for the ride.
47	"Mantra Plots with the Thief"	29 July 2003
Jayashree panics as Hansa goes missing. Hansa returns and reveals that she never went on the water slide. Meanwhile, the thief tricks Jacky into going along with him. However, he escapes seeing Raju and Bhavesh. Later, Mantra asks the thief to kidnap Jacky in return for the jewellery.
48	"Family Rescues Jacky"	5 August 2003
Jacky is kidnapped while acting in a play. Raju find the diamonds in Hansa’s bag and realises the reason for Jacky’s kidnapping. Anmol uses his power to locate Jacky’s whereabouts. Jayashree and the family hand over the diamonds and rescue Anmol. They chase the thief and catch him.
49	"Return to Mumbai"	12 August 2003
A lady distracts Hansa and puts a packet in her bag. The family returns to Mumbai. An inspector, claiming to have information of drug trafficking, checks Hansa's bag. Jacky tells Chakki that he disposed of the packet. Later, the Parekh family celebrates raksha bandhan.
50	"Tulsidas Feels Unwanted"	19 August 2003
Tulsidas and the kids play a game in which the participants must accept punishment written on chits. After hearing from a kid, Jacky and Chakki worry about Tulsidas going to an old age home. Tulsidas misunderstands the family wants to get rid of him.
51	"Court Case"	26 August 2003
A jealous Jacky accidentally spills ink on Chakki’s painting, Chakki retorts by breaking his toy. The family tries to solve the issue by enacting a court scene. Jayashree and Praful play lawyers. Tulsidas, the judge is to sentence the suspect to boarding school for six years.
52	"Election"	2 September 2003
Jayashree returns from a 12-day trip to Bangalore to find Melissa taking her place. She conducts a family poll for the title of best daughter-in-law. Jayshree and Melissa take part in the election and give their speeches. Melissa impresses everyone, while Jayshree is panned by the family.
53	"The Hospital"	9 September 2003
While playing with ball, Jacky injures his hand. Jayashree rushes him to the hospital. Meanwhile, Himanshu suggests that the hospital better its interiors by hiring pretty girls to welcome the patients. Praful annoys the doctor. Later, Jayashree starts cooking in the hospital. Guest Stars: Disha Vakani as nurse.
54	"Praful-Hansa Wedding Part 1"	16 September 2003
Jacky and Chakki discuss writing a story for their school magazine. Chakki decides to document Praful and Hansa’s love story. Praful’s antics get unbearable and his prospective bride breaks the relationship. Later, Tulsidas consoles Praful. He tells the kids of the time when Praful and Hansa fell in love.
55	"Praful-Hansa Wedding Part 2"	23 September 2003
Hansa’s parents visit to fix the wedding of Hansa and Praful. Tulsidas orders Praful to shut his mouth. Hansa’s father is angry on learning that Praful’s engagement was broken twice. Tulsidas hits back by reminding him that Hansa’s engagement was broken thrice. Himanshu and Jayashree help the couple marry.
56	"Dandiya Night"	30 September 2003
While Jayashree and Hansa sing a song on dandiya night, Praful frustrates the family by playing the piano. Meanwhile, Melissa is angry at Raju for flirting with a girl. She asks the girl to tie a rakhi. Later, Jacky and Chakki perform garba rituals while the family enjoys dandiya.
57	"Mr. Mehta at Parekhs'"	7 October 2003
After his wife throws him out of the house, Mr Mehta seeks the Parekhs’ help and collapses. He asks the Parekhs to call his family doctor. Mr Mehta’s wife visits the Parekh household and takes Mr Mehta back to her house.
58	"Mami's Birthday"	14 October 2003
The Parekhs celebrate Mami’s birthday. Her health worsens when she tries to blow the candle off. Jacky and Chakki discuss Mami’s last three wishes. The family tries to fulfil her wishes. Mami thanks the family for their kindness, and tells them to stay in her bungalow after her death.
59	"Diwali Celebration"	21 October 2003
Jacky and Chakki plan to celebrate diwali. They see a small boy asking his mother for a shirt. They offer to buy the shirt as a diwali gift. Tulsidas is thrilled and feels proud of them. The family enjoys the festival. Meanwhile, Praful and Hansa irritate a jeweller.
60	"Babuji Dead!"	28 October 2003
Praful offers to help Jacky and Hansa fill their dance class forms. He gets ready to go to Delhi. However, the train meets with an accident. Meanwhile, Jayashree plans Praful to pose as Tulsidas' wife to claim insurance.
61	"Tulsidas Angers Jayshree"	4 November 2003
The family plays a game of antakshari. During the fun and games, Jayashree misunderstands Tulsidas for backbiting against her. Annoyed, she leaves the house. Raju, Melissa and Bhavesh convince Jayashree to not leave the house. Jacky and Chakki are glad to see Jayashree stay at home.
62	"Children's Day Celebration Plan"	11 November 2003
The school teacher decides to celebrate Children’s Day through a drama performance. Hansa informs the school teacher’s plan to stage Cinderella’s story to Tulsidas and decides to help the teacher in arranging the funds for the play.
63	"Beauty Contest"	18 November 2003
Sweety challenges Chakki to a beauty contest. Tulsidas tells Jayashree and Hansa that he is the judge for the competition. Hansa and Jayashree also participate. During the competition, Praful brings a fan regulator instead of camera.
64	"Hansa & Praful in Kolkata"	25 November 2003
Hansa informs Jayashree about a relative’s wedding in Kolkata. Hansa and Parful decide to go to Kolkata to attend the wedding but they miss the train. Meanwhile, a thief tries to steal the jewellery.
65	"Exam Results"	2 December 2003
Jacky and Chakki tell the family about their impressive exam results. Meanwhile, the family irritates the teachers by attending classes. The family members prepare Hansa and Praful for the exam. Praful and Hansa also pass the exam along with the other family members.
66	"Hansa Irritates Mr. Mehta"	9 December 2003
Chakki informs Jayashree that Praful has not visited the office for a month. Praful tells Tulsidas that Mr Mehta terminated him from the job. The family requests Mehta to re-hire Praful. However, Hansa is hired. Hansa irritates Mr Mehta by bringing Praful back to the office.
67	"Parminder to leave for Chandigarh"	16 December 2003
Parminder invites the family to his nephew’s birthday party. However, as per the invitation card, the party is staged at Parekh household. Parminder evokes the wrath of Tulsidas. Meanwhile, Praful and Hansa try to make Himanshu realise his love for Parminder, who prepares to leave for Chandigarh.
68	"Himanshu's Marriage is Fixed!"	23 December 2003
Jayshree disguises as a priest to fix Himanshu and Parminder's marriage. However, when Hansa searches for Jayshree, she gives away the costume to Himanshu. However, he runs away when Hansa, Praful and Tulsidas arrive to talk to the priest, unaware that Himanshu is the priest.
69	"Parminder Accepts Himanshu"	30 December 2003
Jayashree impersonates a priest to fix Himanshu and Parminder’s marriage. While Hansa, Praful and Tulsidas talk to the priest, an angry Himanshu leaves. Meanwhile, Parminder visits the house to accept Himanshu’s marriage proposal
70	"Tulsidas' Challenge"	6 January 2004
Seeing Falguni's mother leave, Tulsidas challenges Jayshree to stop gossiping for one day. In return, Raju promises to gift her a television. While the family fails, Raju brings a girl to break Jayshree's habit.
71	"Praful's Lunacy"	13 January 2004
Tulsidas challenges Parminder to a kite-flying competition. Praful removes bulbs and lights to prepare threads, which irks Tulsidas. Further, Praful is told to buy 'gum' and instead gets a person, who has 'gham' (sorrow) in life. Later, Jayshree succeeds in cutting Parminder and Tulsidas' kites.
72	"Praful is Kidnapped!"	20 January 2004
Praful's bag gets exchanged with another person. Later, he puts a cross mark on the cheque when asked for a 'cancelled cheque'. Later, the bag-owner kidnaps Praful. The family gets tensed seeing Praful missing. Later, the kidnappers place Praful's duplicate to retrieve the bag.
73	"Praful's Duplicate is fed up"	27 January 2004
Hansa and Chakki suspect the duplicate, seeing his different behaviour. On one hand, the original Praful irritates the kidnappers; the duplicate falls ill after eating Hansa's food and reveals the truth.
74	"Jacky's Misbehavior"	3 February 2004
Jacky informs the family that he has been awarded the Student of the Year title, in his school. Later, he becomes arrogant and misbehaves with the elders. The family decides to teach him a lesson.
75	"Himanshu's Proposal"	10 February 2004
Jayshree plans for Himanshu and Parminder's meeting on Valentine’s Day. Tulsidas yells at Himanshu for printing menu cards instead of wedding invites. In the midst of Parminder and Tulsidas's tiff, Himanshu proposes to Parminder.
76	"Hansa becomes a Heroine"	17 February 2004
Praful's director-friend casts Hansa as the lead in his film and she consequently joins the gym to lose weight. When the entire family hits the gym, Tulsidas gets a cramp. Praful gets a homeopathy doctor and later, irritates the clients at the gym while Hansa keeps gorging.
77	"Jacky's Surprise Birthday Plan"	24 February 2004
Jayshree informs Parminder that there are only 28 days in February and she needn't worry about paying taxes on.
78	"No Colors for Holi"	2 March 2004
The Parekhs celebrate Holi in Parminder's farmhouse. Praful foolishly orders colours from America and Tulsidas is irked with him. The family then plays Antakshari instead. Meanwhile, a policeman tries to get a bribe from Jacky, Chakki and Himanshu on seeing a dead body; but ends up paying them himself.
79	"The Family Exchanges Positions"	9 March 2004
Praful washes Tulsidas's spectacles instead of the car glass. The family exchanges positions in the house to determine whether men are better than women. The women are unable to lure customers in the business and Parminder distracts Himanshu, leaving the food burnt.
80	"Bhavesh's Endeavor"	16 March 2004
Bhavesh is thrown out of the house for constantly being hungry. He tells Tulsidas he will earn one lakh rupees in a month. He then advertises prize money of the same amount for the best 'Ghar Jamai'. However, he loses the contest with his speech.
81	"Sports Day"	23 March 2004
Tulsidas and his family are all set for a basketball match for sports day. Jayshree and Tulsidas are the captains. While Jayshree distracts Hansa, Raju is tempted by food. The game ends with Jayshree's team as winners.
82	"Himanshu's 'Hijab'"	30 March 2004
During the race, Himanshu falls down due to his 'hijab'. Parminder and Tulsidas argue on the rituals to be conducted to remove the 'hijab'. Meanwhile, Hansa is concerned about her sari colour matching the food. In the end, Madhvi removes the 'hijab'.
83	"Praful gets a 'Train Singer'"	6 April 2004
Jacky and Chakki are unable to study with the chaos in the house. Later, Praful brings home a singer, who sings in the train, instead of a trained singer. But when Kanchan abuses Praful, Hansa and Jayshree, Jayshree plans to teach her a lesson.
84	"A New Maid"	13 April 2004
In Melissa's absence, the Parekhs gets a new maid, who adds to the chaos and misunderstanding in the house; but acts innocent in front of Tulsidas. However, the family successfully gets Tulsidas to see the truth and throws her out.
85	"Tulsidas and Sandhya"	20 April 2004
On the eve of Hansa and Praful's wedding anniversary, Tulsidas misses his wife. Later, Sandhya comes to Parekh’s house. Jayshree sees a nightmare, in which Tulsidas marries Sandhya. However, when Tulsidas reveals the truth, Jayshree apologises to Sandhya.
86	"Robbers Attack the Bank"	27 April 2004
Himanshu rejoices as the sale is over and decides to shop for double the rate. Tulsidas enters the bank to withdraw cash. As Jayshree and Hansa irritate the bankers and Praful gets another passbook, some robbers attack the bank.
87	"Parekhs Nab the Robbers"	4 May 2004
Hansa grabs the pistol from a robber and shows off her skills. As the family tries to escape, one of the robbers faint. Praful acts, as the robber tries to escape. Later, one robber fires at Hansa and the family fights him off.
88	"Pre-Wedding Celebration"	11 May 2004
The family is celebrating Himanshu's pre-wedding rituals. Praful gets a 'goat' instead of a ‘coat', which irks Tulsidas. Jignesh gets everyone involved in the dance and music. Jayshree and Hansa are stunned when Himanshu informs them that Tulsidas is leaving the house.
89	"Chaos at the Wedding"	18 May 2004
Himanshu is brought to his wedding at the wrong time. Jignesh forgets to video-shoot and is made to re-shoot the wedding. Meanwhile, Jayshree blackmails the neighbours to cook food and Himanshu books honeymoon tickets for the entire family!
90	"Himanshu's Suicide Attempt"	25 May 2004
Himanshu brings the family on his honeymoon but forgets his wife and falls sick. Seeing Praful's reaction on his scan report, Himanshu thinks he is going to die and decides to leave Parminder.
91	"Himanshu's Gift"	1 June 2004
Parminder presents a necklace to Himanshu, but is upset when he doesn't gift her anything. Later, Himanshu gifts her an aftershave lotion. During the forest trip, Himanshu, Chakki, Jacky and Bhavesh go missing and Tulsidas is worried.
92	"Parminder Attempts Suicide"	8 June 2004
Hansa and Praful tease Tulsidas for worrying. Later, Tulsidas consoles Jayshree and Hansa as they are tensed about the kids. Meanwhile, Raju gives photographs of the missing members to the police. Parminder attempts suicide thinking she has lost Himanshu. Just then, Himanshu, Jacky, Chakki and Bhavesh arrive.
93	"Tribal Attack"	15 June 2004
Praful gets a doctor for Parminder's skin allergy. Despite Jacky and Chakki's warnings, Parminder is taken to the temple for a holy bath. There, the tribals kidnap the family and Praful teases the tribal king. Irked by the family's nonsense, the tribals release them.
94	"Tribal King's Proposal"	22 June 2004
The family is planning Himanshu and Parminder's first night. However, the tribal king wants Tulsidas to marry his sister. Hansa and Praful innocently accept his proposal.
95	"The Valuable Shirt"	29 June 2004
Jayshree exchanges Tulsidas's new shirt for utensils. Later, she overhears Tulsidas telling Jacky and Chakki about the valuables in the shirt pocket. Later, Jayshree finds the shirt and is shocked to see Raju's photo in the pocket.
96	"Rahul's Punishment"	6 July 2004
As a punishment for hitting Jacky in school, Rahul is ordered to stay with the Parekhs for a week. Rahul gets irritated with Praful and Hansa, and wishes to go back to the hostel. Tulsidas consoles him and convinces him to stay back.
97	"The Parekhs ' House is Divided"	13 July 2004
Hansa, Praful and Bhavesh make fun of Tulsidas while playing cricket. Meanwhile, Hansa advises Tulsidas to divide the house. Later, Himanshu, Jayshree, Jacky and Chakki get the family back together.
98	"Auction"	20 July 2004
Jayshree wants to sell the old, damaged car and get a new one. Meanwhile, Hansa and Praful win a new car after answering a quiz. Later, Praful and Hansa arrange an auction of old household items and Tulsidas buys his old car. Praful buys a remote car!
