= Kamsin: The Untouched =

1997 film

Kamsin: The Untouched is a 1997 Hindi drama film directed by Amit Suryavanshi. It was released in 1997 in the banner of Sai Baba Film. It is the first film of Disha Vakani. A 2007 film by the same name was directed by C.P. Singh.

== Plot ==
Disha is a college student. On holidays, she goes to the countryside along with friends that start dying one after another.

== Cast ==
- Disha Vakani
- Shiva Rindani
- Amit Pachori

== Reception ==
The film has been repeatedly presented as a "B-grade movie".
