= Saarrthi =

- Created by: Asit Kumarr Modi
- Written by: Prakash Kapadia; R M Joshi; Kapil Bavad; Mitesh Shah; Timir Kireet Bakshi
- Directed by: Qaeed Kuwajerwala
- Starring: See Below
- Opening theme: Yadā yadā hi dharmasya
- Country of origin: India
- Original language: Hindi
- No. of episodes: 708

Production
- Producer: Asit Kumarr Modi
- Running time: 24 minutes

Original release
- Network: Star Plus
- Release: 9 November 2004 – 15 February 2008

Saarrthi is a Hindi drama television series broadcast on Star Plus and produced by Asit Kumarr Modi under Neela Tele Films Private Limited. It aired from 8 November 2004 to 15 February 2008 and contained 708 episodes. The story is a reworking of the Hindu epic, the Mahabharata, detailing the conflict between two brothers and their families in contemporary India.

The drama serial premiered on 9 November 2004 and aired Monday through Thursday. In August 2007, Saarrthi began airing on Fridays as well.

== Plot ==
The story and characters are adapted from Mahabharata which is a story of conflict between two half-brothers – Mansen and Siddhartha (Dhritarashtra and Pandu) – and their families. The lead, Bhoomika (Subhadra), and her husband Arjun (Arjuna), portray the eternal couple who try to bring peace between the warring families. Along with them is Manasvi (Draupadi) who becomes the center of a conflict between two brothers Satya (Yudhishthira) and Suraj (Karna).While the antagonists are Shifali (Bhanumati), and her husband Yuvraj (Duryodhana).

== Cast ==
- Neha Devi Singh as Bhoomika Arjun Goenka (2004–2007)
- Karan Grover as Arjun Goenka (2004–2007)
- Nawab Shah as Mansen Goenka (2004–2008)
- Manasi Salvi as Manasvi Goenka (2004–2006)
- Rahil Azam as Suraj Kiran (2004–2006)
- Rajesh Shringarpure as Lord Krishna (2004–2008)
- Adita Wahi / Tiya Gandwani as Shefali Yuvraj Goenka (2004–2006) / (2006–2007)
- Zalak Thakkar as Devika Parekh / Bhoomika Goenka (2007–2008)
- Gurpreet Singh as Rudra Singh (2007–2008)
- S. M. Zaheer as Devrath Goenka (2004–2008)
- Micckie Dudaaney as Yuvraj Goenka (2004–2008)
- Ashish Kapoor as Satyajeet Goenka (2004–2005)
- Sadhana Singh as Shakuntala Goenka
- Romanchak Arora as Keshav (2004–2006)
- Parikshit Sahni as Hemraj Goenka (2004–2008)
- Neena Kulkarni / Savita Prabhune as Kumud Goenka (2004–2005) / (2005–2008)
- Shashi Puri as Siddhartha Goenka
- Mayank Anand as Shakti Goenka (2004)
- Manav Gohil as Shyam (2007)
- Addite Shirwaikar as Vishakha
- Kavita Kaushik
- Kanika Kohli
- Rajeev Bhardwaj
- Dimple Inamdar
- Kiran Karmarkar as Bhujang Ahuja
