= Bau Na Vichar =

2019 Gujarati Movie

- Theatrical poster
- Directed by: Hrutul Patel
- Written by: Hrutul & Heet bhatt
- Screenplay by: Hrutul & Heet bhatt
- Produced by: Dharmesh patel Bhaumik Gondaliya
- Starring: Bhavya Gandhi; Janki Bodiwala; Shah Devarshi; Bhatt Bhushan; Ragi Jani
- Cinematography: Suraj Kurade
- Edited by: Rraja Sanjay Choksi
- Music by: Hrutul Patel; Badal Soni
- Release date: 3 May 2019
- Running time: 151 minutes
- Country: India
- Language: Gujarati

Bau Na Vichar is an Indian Gujarati Comedy-drama film, written and directed by Hrutul Patel, released in 2019. The cinematography was by Suraj Kurade and editing by Rraja Sanjay Choksi. The film stars Bhatt Bhushan, Devarshi Shah, Bhavya Gandhi and Janki Bodiwala in leading roles. The principal photography of the movie was started on 26 October 2018.

== Plot ==
The story revolves around a resourceful youngster, Varun who joins a reality show for entrepreneurs. He wants to win it to prove his worth to his family, friends and business partners.

== Cast ==
- Bhavya Gandhi as Varun
- Janki Bodiwala as Shivani
- Devarshi Shah as Arun
- Ragi Jani as Dadu
- Bhatt Bhushan as BD
- Galsar Sanjay as Tako
- Aayushi Parekh as Soha
- Chauhan Navjot Singh as Hardik

== Soundtrack ==
The soundtrack of Bau Na Vichar consists of 6 songs composed by Hrutul Patel, Badal Soni and Kushal Chokshi (Taari gamti vato) with the lyrics being written by Hrutul and Tushar Shukla.

Tracklist
No.	Title	Lyrics	Artist(s)	Length
1.	"Bau Na Vichaar Title"	Hrutul Patel	Parth Oza, Kirtidan Gadhvi, Jigardan Gadhavi, Meet Jain, Aditya Gadhavi, Siddharth Amit Bhavsar, Aishwarya Majmudar	2:19
2.	"Ye Shaam Na Lautegi"	Hrutul Patel	Mohit Chauhan	4:15
3.	"Scheme Tu Paade Chhe"	Hrutul Patel	Jigardan Gadhavi	2:51
4.	"BNV Title Song (Siddharth)"	Hrutul Patel	Siddharth Amit Bhavsar	2:16
5.	"Ye Shaam – Reprise"	Hrutul Patel	Badal Soni	3:46
6.	"Taari Gamti Vaato"	Tushar Shukla	Kushal Chokshi	3:13
Total length:				16:43

== Release ==
The trailer of the movie was released on 13 April 2019. The film was released on 3 May 2019. The Times of India rated it 3/5 and said, "This film is a wholesome entertainment package with a good storyline, awesome star-cast and soothing music." The film has moderate success in the box office.
