= Vinod Bhatt =

Indian essayist and biographer (1938–2018)

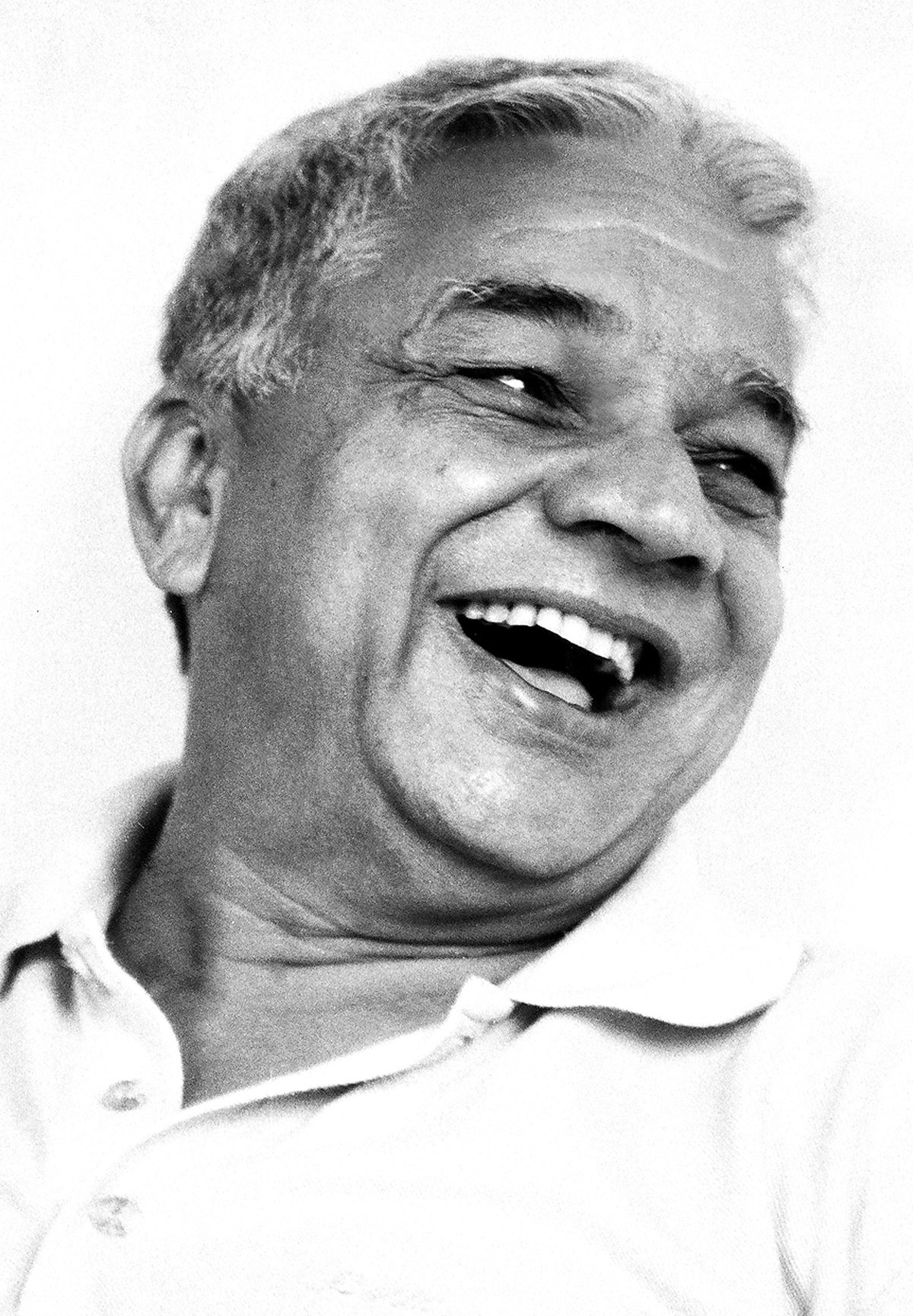
- Bhatt at his residence in Ahmedabad, 1995
- Born: 14 January 1938; Nandol, Bombay Presidency, British India
- Died: 23 May 2018 (aged 80); Ahmedabad, Gujarat, India
- Occupations: Humour essayist, biographer
- Writing career
- Language: Gujarati
- Notable awards: Ranjitram Suvarna Chandrak (1989)

Vinod Bhatt (14 January 1938 – 23 May 2018) was a Gujarati humour essayist and biographer from Gujarat, India.

== Biography ==
Vinod Bhatt was born on 14 January 1938 at Nandol near Dehgam (now in Gujarat) to Jashvantlal and Jayabahen. He matriculated in 1955 and graduated in arts from H. L. Commerce College in 1961. He passed LL.B. in 1964. He worked as a sales tax consultant initially and as an income tax consultant. He was a freelance writer by profession. He was the president of Gujarati Sahitya Parishad from 1996 to 1997. He had written humour columns in Gujarati dailies, Mag Nu Naam Mari in Gujarat Samachar and Idam Trityam in Divya Bhaskar.

Bhatt died in Ahmedabad on 23 May 2018 after a brief illness.

== Selected works ==
He had authored more than 45 books including satire, comedy and biographies.

His humour works include Pehlu Sukh Te Mungi Naar (1962), Aajni Laat (1967), Vinod Bhattna Prem Patro (1972), Idam Tritiyam (1963), Idam Chaturtham (1974), Vinod ni Najare (1979), Ane Have Itihas (1981), Ankh Aada Kan (1982), Granthni Garbad (1983), Naro Va Kunjaro Va (1984), Amdavad Etle Amdavad (1985), Shekhadam Greatadam (1985), Atha thi Iti (1992), Magnu Nam Mari, Pehlu Sukh Te Manda Pandya Hasyopchar (2000), Vinodmelo (2002), Mangal-Amangal (2003), Bhul Chuk Levi Devi, Vagere, Vagere, Vagere.., Kaaranke, Mato : Ek Badnaam Lekhak.

His biographies in light humour include Comedy King Charlie Chaplin (1989), Narmad Ek Character (1989), Swapnadrashta Munshi (1989), Hasyamurti Jyotindra Dave (1989), Great Showmen George Bernard Shaw (1990), Anton Chekov (1994).

Vinod Vimarsh (1987) is a critical work on facets of humour. He edited Shlil-Ashlil (1967), Hasyayan (1987), Shreshth Hasya Rachnao (1981-1989), Sara Jahan Hamara, Hasya Madhuri Part I to V (1985), Prasanna Gathariya (1987), Hasya Navneet (1994), Jyotindra Daveni Pratinidhi Hasyarachnao, Hasyendra Jyotindra (2000). Baital Pachchisi (1987) is his humorous work translated in Hindi. He had published ten works in Hindi including Dekh Kabira Roya, Suna Ansuna, Baital Chabbisi, Bhul Chul Leni Deni, Charlie Chaplin; and one in Sindhi, Najar Najar Jo Fer.

== Awards ==
He received the Ranjitram Suvarna Chandrak, the highest literary award in Gujarati, in 1989. He also received the Kumar Chandrak in 1976 and the Sanskar Chandrak in 1980. He was awarded the Sahitya Gaurav Puraskar by Gujarat Sahitya Akademi in 2005. In 2016, Gujarat Sahitya Akademi awarded him the Ramanlal Nilkanth Hasya Paritoshik.

== See also ==
- List of Gujarati-language writers
