= Shailesh Lodha =

Indian actor, writer and comedian (born 1969)

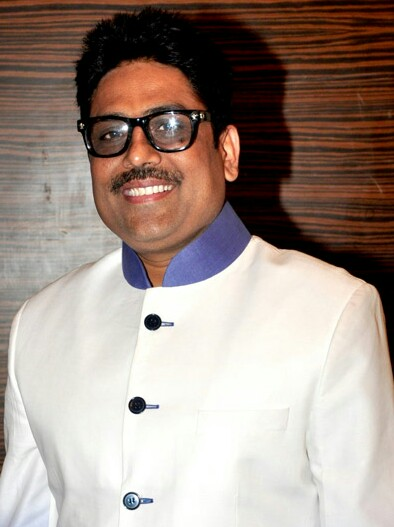
- Lodha in 2012
- Born: 8 November 1969 (age 56); Jodhpur, Rajasthan, India
- Occupations: Poet; Actor; Writer; Host; Anchor; Motivational Speaker
- Years active: 1997–present
- Known for: Taarak Mehta Ka Ooltah Chashmah
- Spouse: Dr Swati Lodha
- Children: 1

Shailesh Lodha (born 8 November 1969) is an Indian poet, actor and writer. He is best known for portraying the character Taarak Mehta in the longest running Hindi sitcom Taarak Mehta Ka Ooltah Chashmah.

== Personal life ==
Lodha was born in Jodhpur in a Marwari family. Lodha is married to a management author, Swati Lodha, and has a daughter Swara. Since his father had a transferable job, Lodha travelled a lot. His mother loved reading and had a good vocabulary in Hindi. At the age of nine, Lodha was nicknamed "Baal Kavi". He had an office job, but he left it to follow his passion, i.e. writing poems. In a 2015 interview Lodha said, "I am half Jain". Lodha has completed B.Sc.

== Career ==
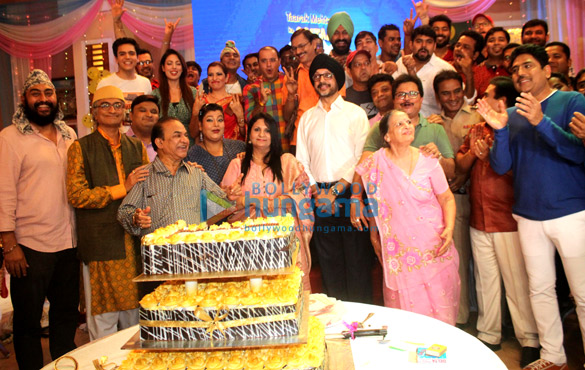
Shailesh Lodha at 12 years anniversary of Taarak Mehta Ka Ooltah Chashmah show

Lodha first appeared on Wah Wah a poetry show created by Shri Adhikari Brothers and then Comedy Circus as a contestant, and later in Comedy ka Mahamukabla. He portrayed Taarak Mehta in the sitcom series Taarak Mehta Ka Ooltah Chashmah from 2008 to 2022.

Lodha was the main presenter in the TV program Wah! Wah! Kya Baat Hai! telecast on SAB TV during 2012-13. In 2019, he appeared in the comedy film Wig Boss along with Sunil Pal and Rakhi Sawant.

In 2022, Lodha filed a lawsuit against producer Asit Kumarr Modi for his pending dues and on his production company Neela Tele Films. On 5 August 2023, the verdict came in Lodha's favour.

== Filmography ==
=== Television ===
Years	Title	Role	Notes
2008–2022	Taarak Mehta Ka Ooltah Chashmah	Taarak Mehta	
2008	Comedy Circus 2	Himself	
2011	Comedy Ka Maha Muqabala	Himself	
2011	Bahut Khoob	Host	
2013–2014	Wah! Wah! Kya Baat Hai!	Host	
2022–2023	Waah Bhai Waah	Host	
2024	Indian Idol 14	Guest	
2024	Madness Machayenge - India Ko Hasayenge	Guest	
2024; 2026	Advocate Anjali Awasthi	Advocate Ramesh Patel	

== Author ==
Lodha has written four books: the first two are satirical humour; the third is a self-help book co-written with his wife; and his most recent book, Diljale Ka Facebook Status, is a collection of poems written from the point of view of a jilted lover.

== Awards ==
- National Srijan Award 2016
- Bharat Gaurav
- Rajasthan Gaurav
- Kaka Hathrasi Hasya Ratna Award 2022

=== TV awards ===
- 2014 – Zee Gold Awards (Best Anchor)
- 2018 – Zee Gold Awards (Best Actor in Comic Role) [Male]
