= Ramanlal Nilkanth Hasya Paritoshik =

Ramanlal Nilkanth Hasya Paritoshik Ramanlal Nilkanth Humour Prize
- Civilian award for contributions to Literature
- Awarded for: Literary honour
- Sponsored by: Gujarat Sahitya Akademi
- Location: Gujarat, India
- Reward: ₹ 1,00,000 (1 lakh)
- First award: 2016
- Final award: 2017

Highlights
- Total awarded: 2
- First winner: Vinod Bhatt
- Last winner: Taarak Mehta

The Ramanlal Nilkanth Hasya Prize (Gujarati: રમણલાલ નિલકંઠ હાસ્ય પારિતોષિક), is a literary honour in Gujarat, India. It is named after renowned Gujarati writer Ramanbhai Neelkanth. The award is conferred by Gujarat Sahitya Akademi and Government of Gujarat to the Gujarati authors for their significant contribution in Gujarati humour literature. Established in 2016, the award comprises a plaque, shawl and a cash prize of Rs. 1,00,000 (one lakh).

== Recipients ==
Following is the list of recipients.

Year	Recipients
2016	Vinod Bhatt
2017	Taarak Mehta
