= Munmun Dutta =

Indian actress and model

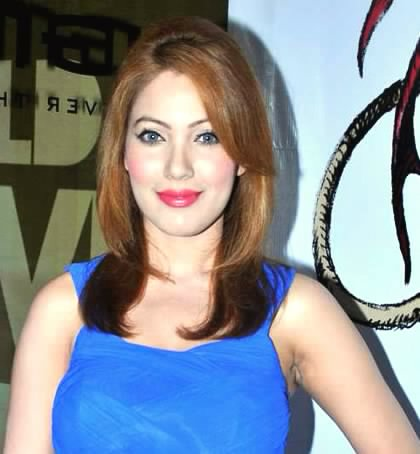
- Dutta in 2013
- Born: Durgapur, West Bengal, India
- Citizenship: Indian
- Education: M.A. (English Literature)
- Occupations: Actress, model
- Years active: 2004–present
- Known for: Babita Iyer in Taarak Mehta Ka Ooltah Chashmah

Munmun Dutta (Bengali pronunciation: [munmun dɔtːo]; born 28 September 1987), is an Indian actress who works in Hindi television. She made her television debut in Zee TV's 2004 series Hum Sab Baraati and is best known for her portrayal of Babita Iyer in the Hindi sitcom Taarak Mehta Ka Ooltah Chashmah.

== Early life and education ==
Dutta was born in Durgapur, West Bengal. She completed a master's degree in English. In Kolkata, she used to perform as a child singer for Akashvani and Doordarshan. She made her acting debut in Zee TV's 2004 serial Hum Sab Baraati. Her first film role was in Kamal Haasan's Mumbai Xpress. In 2006, she appeared in the film Holiday.

== Filmography ==
=== Television ===
Year	Title	Role
2004	Hum Sab Baraati	Meethi
2008–present	Taarak Mehta Ka Ooltah Chashmah	Babita Krishnan Iyer
2018	Indian Idol 10	Guest
2021	Kaun Banega Crorepati 13	Guest
2022	Bigg Boss 15	Guest
2022	The Khatra Khatra Show	Guest

=== Films ===
Year	Title	Role
2006	Holiday	Shuli

== Awards and nominations ==
Year	Award	Work	Category	Result	Ref.
2017	Nickelodeon Kids' Choice Awards India	Taarak Mehta Ka Ooltah Chashmah	Favorite Actress – TV	Nominated	
2018	Nickelodeon Kids' Choice Awards India	Taarak Mehta Ka Ooltah Chashmah	Favorite Actress – TV	Won	
2019	Nickelodeon Kids' Choice Awards India	Taarak Mehta Ka Ooltah Chashmah	Favorite Actress – TV	Nominated	
2020	Gold Glam and Style Awards	—N/a	Women of Substance	Won	
2021	Indian Television Academy Awards	Taarak Mehta Ka Ooltah Chashmah	Best Actress in a Supporting Role	Won	

== Controversy ==
In 2021, a case was filed against her for a casteist slur. The actress, however, apologised later. In 2022, she was arrested and interrogated but was later released.

== See also ==
- List of Hindi television actresses
