= Pyaar Mein Twist (TV series) =

- Starring: Roshni Chopra
- Country of origin: India
- Original language: Hindi
- No. of episodes: 34

Production
- Producer: Asit Kumarr Modi
- Running time: 45 minutes

Original release
- Network: StarPlus
- Release: 29 January – 5 June 2011

Pyaar Mein Twist (transl. Twist In Love) is an Indian comedy drama series on StarPlus, produced by Neela Tele Films. The series premiered on 29 January 2011 and on-aired last episode on 5 June 2011. It is a comedy that tells the story of a geeky, humble and a simple boy Amol and a loving, bubbly and total filmy girl Rekha. Pyaar Mein Twist is about a lovely "made for each other" couple – who love each other a lot but end up fighting with each other because of others.

== Plot ==
The show revolves around a geek named Amol and a hot girl called Rekha. Amol is a nerdy guy who first meets Rekha at a camp after college ends and he tries to save Rekha from some goons. Rekha starts liking Amol from the day of the campfire. When Rekha's mother wants Rekha to marry Rohit, the guy who left Rekha with the goons the day of the campfire, she refuses.

Rekha's mother tells her to choose between three pictures or else she will have to marry Rohit. Since she doesn't want to marry any of them she proposes to Amol who loves her a lot. They marry without anyone knowing.

== Cast ==
- Manish Paul as Amol
- Roshni Chopra as Rekha
- Vishal Kotian as Vicky
- Bharti Singh as Pammi
- Rakesh Bedi as Om Prakash
- Azaan Rustam Shah
- Prasad Barve as Bobby
- Neha Prajapati as Chanda
