= Bhavya Gandhi =

Indian actor (born 1997)

- Born: Bhavya Vinod Gandhi; 20 June 1997 (age 29); Mumbai, Maharashtra, India
- Education: University of Mumbai
- Occupation: Actor
- Years active: 2008–present
- Known for: Taarak Mehta Ka Ooltah Chashmah
- Height: 1.72 m (5 ft 8 in)
- Website: bhavyagandhi.com

Bhavya Gandhi (born 20 June 1997) is an Indian actor who mainly works in Hindi television and Gujarati films. He is best known for his portrayal of Tapu in Taarak Mehta Ka Ooltah Chashmah.

Bhavya made his film debut in 2017 with Pappa Tamne Nahi Samjaay and has done films like Bau Na Vichar and Baap Kamaal Dikro Dhamaal. He also Appeared in Shadi uppay

== Early and personal life ==
Bhavya is from a Gujarati Jain family. He lives with his parents and elder brother in Mumbai. He has completed his Bachelor of Commerce graduation. He is the maternal cousin of Samay Shah, who played his on-screen friend Gurucharan Singh Sodhi on Taarak Mehta Ka Ooltah Chashmah. Bhavya Gandhi's mother's name is Yashoda Gandhi and she is a homemaker, his father's name is Vinod Gandhi who was a businessman and he also has an elder brother named Nischit Gandhi. His father died on 12 May 2021 due to Covid related complications.

== Career ==
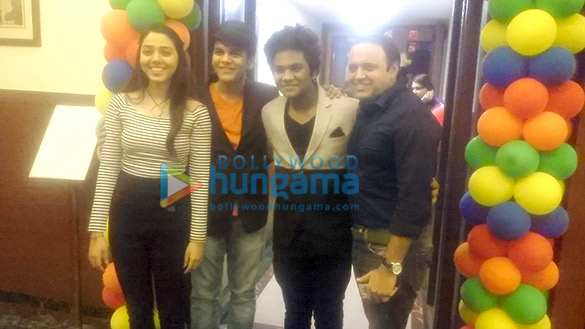
Bhavya with TMKOC team

From 2008 to 2017, Gandhi appeared in the comedy show Taarak Mehta Ka Ooltah Chashmah as Tipendra "Tapu" Jethalal Gada, son of Jethalal and Daya. He left the show to pursue a career as a film actor, saying that the makers are ignoring his character in the show. Bhavya became a household name with his role of Tapu.

Gandhi first appeared in films with the role of child lead Suryakant in the 2010 Hindi language film Striker. He also appeared in a short film Fidget Spinner as Aniket.

Bhavya made his Gujarati film debut with Pappa Tamne Nahi Samjaay, in 2017. It starred Manoj Joshi, Ketki Dave and Johny Lever and was a critical and commercial success.

In 2018, he did a Gujarati drama film Baap Kamaal Dikro Dhamaal with Dharmesh Vyas, Ragi Jani and Falguni Mistry.

In 2019, he appeared in the show Shaadi Ke Siyape, where he played the role of Nanku. In the same year, he played the lead role in Gujarati film Bau Na Vichar which was a moderate success.

In 2021, he appeared in the romantic movie Tari Sathe. In 2022, he acted in Gujarati comedy film Kehvatlal Parivar.

Gandhi is set to next appear in the Hindi film Doctor Doctor.

He also appeared in pushpa impossible in a negative role

== Filmography ==
=== Films ===
Year	Title	Role	Notes	Ref.
2010	Striker	Young Suryakant	Child actor	
2017	Pappa Tamne Nahi Samjaay	Munjal Mehta		
2018	Baap Dhamal Dikro Kamal	Various Characters		
2019	Bau Na Vichaar	Varun		
2021	Tari Sathe	Vadodara boy		
2022	Kehvatlal Parivar	Himesh Thakar		
2024	Ajab Raat Ni Gajab Vaat	Kartik		
2025	Kesari Veer	Lakha		
TBA	Doctor Doctor †	TBA	Completed	

=== Television ===
Year	Title	Role	Notes
2008–2017	Taarak Mehta Ka Ooltah Chashmah	Tipendra "Tapu" Jethalal Gada	Acting and Television debut
2010	Comedy Ka Daily Soap	Himself	Episodic role
2014	C.I.D.	Tipendra Jethalal Gada aka "Tapu"	Guest
2019	Shaadi Ke Siyape	Nanku	
2024	Pushpa Impossible	Prabhas Khanna	Guest

== Awards ==
Year	Award	Category	Show	Result
2010	Indian Telly Awards	Most Popular Child Artist (Male)	Taarak Mehta Ka Ooltah Chashmah	Won
2011	Zee Gold Awards	Best Child Artist	Taarak Mehta Ka Ooltah Chashmah	Won
2013	Zee Gold Awards	Best Child Artist	Taarak Mehta Ka Ooltah Chashmah	Won
2016	Nickelodeon Kids Choice Awards	Best Child Entertainer	Taarak Mehta Ka Ooltah Chashmah	Won
