= Krishnaben Khakhrawala =

- Genre: Drama
- Written by: Asit Kumarr Modi
- Screenplay by: Harsha Jagdish; Swati Pandey; Garima Goyal
- Directed by: Harshad Joshi
- Starring: See below
- Theme music composer: Paresh Shah
- Country of origin: India
- Original language: Hindi
- No. of seasons: 1
- No. of episodes: 215

Production
- Producers: Neela Asit Modi; Asit Kumarr Modi
- Production location: Mumbai
- Editors: Santosh Singh & K. Rajgopalan
- Camera setup: Multi-camera
- Running time: Approx. 24 minutes
- Production company: Neela Tele Films Private Limited

Original release
- Network: Sony Entertainment Television
- Release: 29 November 2010 – 29 September 2011

Krishnaben Khakhrawala is an Indian television series that premiered on Sony TV on 29 November 2010. The series is produced by Neela Tele Films.

The show ended on 29 September 2011, reportedly due to low ratings.

== Plot ==
Krishnaben Khakhrawala's story is based on the Khakhra of Krishnaben. People like and love Krishnaben more than her Khakhras. She is about 45 years old, and is an icon for the common man. Her energy, hard work and her image of an ideal mother is recognized by people in this region. She is a sensitive business woman also.

Life of Krishnaben has been a mixed bag of joy and pain but Krishnaben has taken everything in her stride to become what she is today. Krishnaben's husband, Ravi died within 12 years of their marriage. Krishnaben took responsibility of her 3 sons-10 years old Ilesh, 9 years old Nilay, 7 years old twins Uday and a daughter – Divya very carefully. Krishnaben raised the children and faced life with a lively and undying spirit. She is also a loving, caring and religious woman. She has principle, positive thinking and a strong will.

Even though Krishnaben is a widow, she dresses up well for her children's sake. The story of Krishnaben Khakhrawala on Sony TV begins at a point when, the children want their mother to stop working hard by selling snacks and live peacefully and relax with them. Krishnaben also respects her children's demand. She had sacrificed her life, working hard day and night for her children in this serial. She had taught them good values.

== Cast ==
=== Main ===
- Indira Krishnan as Krishna Ravi Patel a.k.a. Krishnaben Khakrawala - Ilesh, Nilay, Uday and Divya's mother, Bhoomi 's mother in law. Ravi's widow. She is a hardworking woman by making khakras and businesswoman; Her husband died within 12 years of their marriage and she raised her children and faced life with a lively and undying spirit; She is a loving, caring and religious woman and a homemaker; Her shop is near her home in the Ambawadi chawl. (2010–2011)
- Rajesh Shringarpure as Ravi Patel :Krishna's late Husband; Ilesh, Nilay, Uday and Divya's Father
- Nehalaxmi Iyer as Divya Ravi Patel :Krishna and Ravi's daughter; Elesh, Nilay, Uday's sister; Bhoomi's sister-in-law.(2010–2011)
- Mehul Vyas as Uday Ravi Patel- Elesh, Nilay, Divya's brother; Krishna and Ravi's youngest son.
- Dhruvraj Sharma as Nilay Ravi Patel: Krishna and Ravi's son, Elesh, Uday and Divya's brother
- Sohan Master as Ilesh Ravi Patel- Krishna and Ravi's elder son; Nilay, Uday and Divya's elder brother; Bhoomi's husband.

=== Recurring ===
- Shilpa Raizada as Basanti
- Sonia Kapoor as Mitali Kapoor
- Rita Bhaduri as Santu Baa She is a rich woman and likes show off her wealth and She wanted to stay Bhoomi and Elesh in a flat not in a chawl; she had fights with Krishnaben. She is from Surat; Bhoomi's grandmother.(2011)
- Massheuddin Qureshi as Bhumi's father
- Jyoti Patel as Lakshmi
- Simran Khanna as Bhoomi Elesh Patel - Elesh's wife; Krishnaben's daughter in law
- Vinayak Ketkar as Saraswati's husband
- Mehul Nisar
- Mansi Jain as Nikita: Divya's bully.
- Deepak Pareek as Elesh's .boss
