= Jennifer Mistry Bansiwal =

Indian television actress

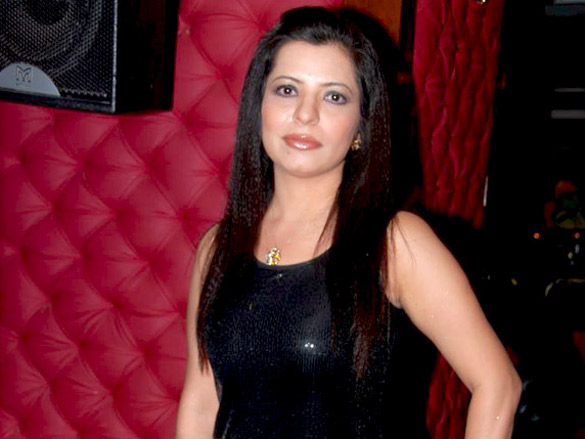
- Bansiwal at Taarak Mehta Ka Ooltah Chashmah's 500 episodes success party
- Born: 27 November 1973 (age 52); Jabalpur, Madhya Pradesh, India
- Education: Guru Gobind Singh Khalsa School
- Occupation: Actress
- Known for: Taarak Mehta Ka Ooltah Chashmah
- Spouse: Mayur Bansiwal (m. 1998)
- Children: Lekissha Mistry Bansiwal

Jennifer Mistry Bansiwal is an Indian actress. She is best known for portraying Roshan Kaur Sodhi in the long-running Hindi television sitcom Taarak Mehta Ka Ooltah Chashmah. She has also appeared in the films; Halla Bol (2008), and Airlift (2016). Jennifer was born to a Parsi father and Christian Mother.

== Filmography ==
Films
Year	Title	Role	Notes
2008	Halla Bol		
2008	Krazzy 4		
2009	Luck by Chance	Junior artist 1	
2011	Yamala pagla Deewana		
2016	Airlift	Rita	

Television
Year	Title	Role	Notes
2008–2013; 2016–2023	Taarak Mehta Ka Ooltah Chashmah	Roshan Daruwala Kaur Sodhi	Parallel Lead
2015	Naagin	Ramya Mathur	Episodic role
2017	Savdhaan India		
2021	Super Dancer	Herself	Guest appearance
2021	Kaun Banega Crorepati	Herself	Guest appearance

== See also ==
- List of Hindi television actresses
