= Dilip Joshi =

Indian film and television actor (born 26 May 1968)

- Joshi(on the left) in 2012 with Abhishek Bachchan
- Born: Mumbai, Maharashtra, India
- Occupation: Actor
- Years active: 1989–present
- Known for: Taarak Mehta Ka Ooltah Chashmah
- Spouse: Jaymala Joshi
- Children: 2

Dilip Joshi is an Indian actor who works in Hindi films and television and is best known for portraying the lead role in the long-running Indian Hindi-language television sitcom, Taarak Mehta Ka Ooltah Chashmah, in which he plays the role of a businessman Jethalal Champaklal Gada, who gets himself in many problems and troubles. The show originally broadcasts on the channel Sony SAB.

== Early life and education ==
Joshi was born in Mumbai. He started acting at the age of 12. While doing BCA, he was awarded the INT (Indian National Theater) Best Actor. He was also a co-owner of a travel agency.

== Career ==
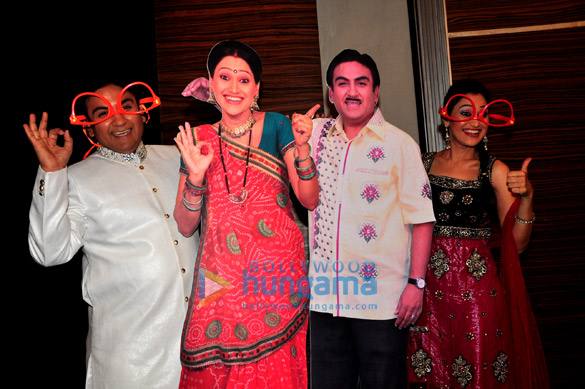
Joshi with his co-star Disha Vakani in success bash for completion of 1000 episodes of TMKOC

Joshi's early career consisted of commercial stage performances as a backstage artist, earning approximately Rs 50 per role. He also appeared in films which included Maine Pyar Kiya and Hum Aapke Hain Koun..!. He also had a minor role in the film Khiladi 420.

During 2008, Joshi began a long run playing the role of Jethalal Champaklal Gada in the sitcom Taarak Mehta Ka Ooltah Chashmah. For his performance in the show, he received several accolades, including five Telly awards and three ITA awards.

== Filmography ==
=== Films ===
Year	Film	Role	Notes
1989	Maine Pyar Kiya	Ramlal "Ramu" Singh	
1992	Hun Hunshi Hunshilal	Hunshilal	
1994	Hum Aapke Hain Koun..!	Bhola Prasad	
1996	Yash	Gopi	
1999	Sar Aakhon Par	Sunday	
2000	Phir Bhi Dil Hai Hindustani	Sapney	
2000	Khiladi 420	Arora	
2001	One 2 Ka 4	Champak	
2002	Humraaz	Gauri Shankar	
2002	Dil Hai Tumhaara	Factory CEO	
2002	Kyaa Dil Ne Kahaa	Rahul's friend	
2008	Firaaq	Deven	
2008	Don Muthu Swami	Fikarchand	
2009	Dhoondte Reh Jaaoge	Mama Nautanki	
2009	What's Your Raashee?	Jitubhai	

=== Television ===
Year	Serial	Role	Notes
1995	Kabhi Yeh Kabhi Woh	Vasu	
1996	Daal Mein Kala	Ajay Koshal	
1997	Kya Baat Hai	Rangaswami	
1998–1997	Kora Kagaz	Varsha's brother	
1998–1997	Do Aur Do Paanch	Rahul	
1998–2001	Hum Sab Ek Hain	Sohan Khachroo	
1999	Yeh Duniya Hai Rangeen	Balkrishna Namudari	
2000	Sewalal Mewalal	Mohan Joshi	
2001	Rishtey – The Love Stories	Pappu Pardesi	Episode "Izzat Ka Falooda"
2002–2004	Shubh Mangal Savadhan	Dilip Joshi	
2002–2003	Meri Biwi Wonderful	Raj	
2004	Aaj Ke Shrimaan Shrimati	Sanjay Sarfare	
2004	Hum Sab Baraati	Nathu Mehta	
2004	Bhagwan Bachaye Inko	Gopi	
2004	Malini Iyer	Ram Jane	
2004–2006	C.I.D Special Bureau	Bob	
2007–2008	F.I.R.	Various characters	
2007	Agadam Bagdam Tigdam	Uncle Tappu	
2008–present	Taarak Mehta Ka Ooltah Chashmah	Jethalal Gada	Lead
2010	Sajan Re Jhoot Mat Bolo	Jethalal Gada	Guest
2014	C.I.D.	Jethalal Gada	Guest

== Awards ==
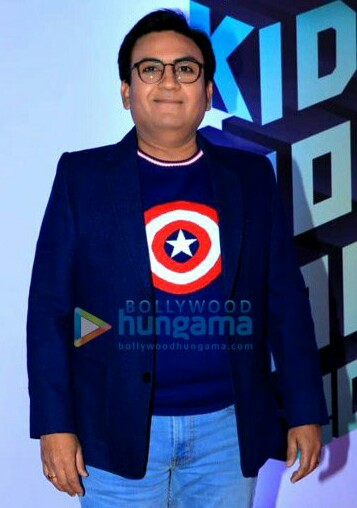
Joshi at an award show

Year	Award	Show	Category
2009	9th Indian Telly Awards	Taarak Mehta Ka Ooltah Chashmah	Best Actor in a Comic Role (Popular)
2010	3rd Boroplus Gold Awards	Taarak Mehta Ka Ooltah Chashmah	Best Comic Actor (Popular)
2010	10th Indian Telly Awards	Taarak Mehta Ka Ooltah Chashmah	Most Popular Actor in a Comic Role
2011	4th Boroplus Gold Awards	Taarak Mehta Ka Ooltah Chashmah	Best Comic Actor (Popular)
2011	BIG Star Entertainment Awards	Taarak Mehta Ka Ooltah Chashmah	Most Entertaining Actor
2011	Apsara Awards	Taarak Mehta Ka Ooltah Chashmah	Best Actor in Drama Series
2012	11th Indian Telly Awards	Taarak Mehta Ka Ooltah Chashmah	Most Popular Actor in a Comic Role
2012	5th Boroplus Gold Awards	Taarak Mehta Ka Ooltah Chashmah	Best Comic Actor (Popular)
2012	People's Choice Awards India	Taarak Mehta Ka Ooltah Chashmah	Best TV Actor – Comedy
2012	12th Indian Television Academy Awards	Taarak Mehta Ka Ooltah Chashmah	Best Actor – Comedy
2013	12th Indian Telly Awards	Taarak Mehta Ka Ooltah Chashmah	Best Actor in a Comic Role (Popular)
2014	Zee Gold Awards	Taarak Mehta Ka Ooltah Chashmah	Best Actor In Comic Role (Male)
2014	14th Indian Television Academy Awards	Taarak Mehta Ka Ooltah Chashmah	Best Actor – Comedy
2016	Zee Gold Awards	Taarak Mehta Ka Ooltah Chashmah	Best Actor In Comic Role (Male)
2018	Zee Gold Awards	Taarak Mehta Ka Ooltah Chashmah	Best Actor – Comedy
2019	15th Indian Telly Awards	Taarak Mehta Ka Ooltah Chashmah	Best Actor in a Comic Role (Jury)
2022	21st Indian Television Academy Awards	Taarak Mehta Ka Ooltah Chashmah	Best Actor – Comedy TV

== See also ==
- List of Indian film actors
- List of Indian television actors
