= Asit Kumarr Modi =

Indian television series producer

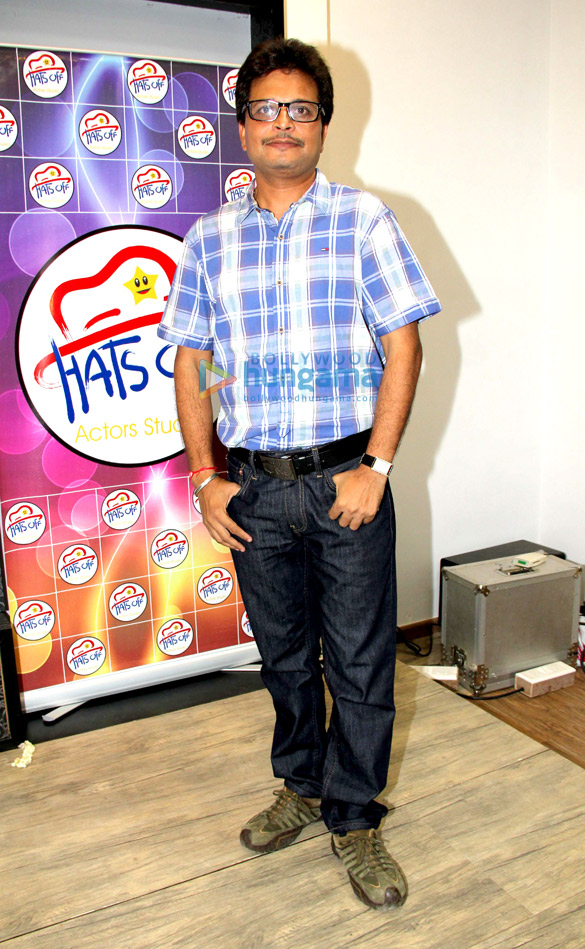
- Asit in 2013
- Born: 24 December 1966 (age 59); Puna (present–day Pune), Maharashtra, India
- Education: Shri Chinai College of Commerce and Economics (B.Com)
- Occupations: Actor; Director; Producer
- Known for: Taarak Mehta Ka Ooltah Chashmah
- Spouse: Neela Asit Modi

Asit Kumarr Modi (born 24 December 1966) is an Indian television producer, director, actor and founder of Neela Film Productions. He is best known for producing serials, Saarrthi, Taarak Mehta Ka Ooltah Chashmah, SAB Khelo SAB Jeeto!, Wah! Wah! Kya Baat Hai!, Krishnaben Khakhrawala, Pyaar Mein Twist, Meri Biwi Wonderful, Yeh Duniya Hai Rangeen and Hum Sab fake Hai.

Modi and his team of Tarak Mehta Ka Ooltah Chashmah were among the first nine citizens of India to be nominated by the India's Prime Minister Narendra Modi to promote his Clean Bhachau Campaign.

== Education ==
He pursued a Bachelor's degree in Commerce from Shri Chinai College of Commerce & Economics.

== Career ==
Asit founded the television production company Neela Tele Films Private Limited (now Neela Film Productions) in 1995, with producing the first show of the company Hum Sab Ek Hain, followed by shows in other genres including comedy, drama, poetry series and reality/game shows.

The Hindi sitcom Taarak Mehta Ka Ooltah Chashmah aired on Sony SAB is based on Gujarati humorist Tarak Mehta's weekly column Duniya Ne Undha Chashma published in the Gujarati magazine Chitralekha.Asit modified the show's story for the present-day audience.

== Controversies ==
=== Lawsuit over unpaid dues ===
In 2023, Taarak Mehta Ka Ooltah Chashmah actor Shailesh Lodha filed a case against Asit Kumarr Modi and his production company over alleged non-payment of dues for his work on the series. Lodha, who portrayed the titular character Taarak Mehta for around 14 years, had left the show in 2022 after a reported dispute with the makers over creative and contractual issues.

Lodha initiated legal proceedings before the National Company Law Tribunal (NCLT) in Mumbai under the Insolvency and Bankruptcy Code, claiming that his professional fees had not been cleared even after repeated follow-ups. According to reports, his petition stated that the producers owed him fees for multiple episodes, and he sought relief through the corporate insolvency route after internal attempts to resolve the matter allegedly failed.

On 5 August 2023, the NCLT-based dispute was reported to have been settled by consent between the parties. As part of the settlement, Modi’s production house agreed to pay Lodha approximately ₹1.05 crore via demand draft towards his outstanding dues. Lodha described the outcome as a matter of “justice” and “self-respect” rather than money, stating that he pursued the case to set a precedent for timely payment to artists.

The show’s project head, Sohail Ramani, claimed in an interview that the production house had “never denied or refused” to pay Lodha and that the delay was linked to formal paperwork and clearances allegedly not completed by the actor.

=== Sexual harassment and workplace harassment allegations ===
In May 2023, actress Jennifer Mistry Bansiwal, who played Roshan Sodhi on Taarak Mehta Ka Ooltah Chashmah, publicly accused Modi of sexual harassment and misconduct on the show’s set. She alleged that, over several years, he had made inappropriate comments, unsolicited advances and remarks of a sexual nature during work-related interactions.

According to Mistry, some of the alleged incidents dated back to 2018, when she approached Modi to complain about the behaviour of an operations head and was met, instead, with remarks on her appearance that she considered inappropriate. She further claimed that during a 2019 overseas shoot in Singapore, Modi allegedly suggested they drink together in his hotel room and made comments about her lips that she perceived as sexually suggestive and distressing. She also described a 2022 incident relating to documentation for an overseas trip, alleging that Modi again made personal, suggestive remarks when she sought help with a visa letter.

Mistry alleged that she initially remained quiet out of fear of losing work, but later raised the issue formally. She stated that on 8 March 2023 she sent a legal notice to Modi and senior production executives and also wrote to relevant authorities. She subsequently filed a complaint at Powai police station, after which an FIR was registered against Modi, operations head Sohail Ramani and executive producer Jatin Bajaj on sexual-harassment-related charges. In interviews, she also alleged that the production was a “male-chauvinistic” workplace and that actors faced what she described as “bonded labour” like conditions, including pressure over working hours and leave.

In March 2024, a local committee constituted under workplace-harassment rules reportedly delivered a verdict in the case, the committee found in Mistry’s favour and directed Modi to clear her pending dues and pay an additional ₹5 lakh as compensation for harassment, with the total amount she said was owed to her being around ₹25–30 lakh. Mistry stated that the verdict confirmed her allegations but expressed disappointment that, in her view, there was no further punitive action against the accused and that she had yet to receive the full amount ordered.

In 2025, Mistry reiterated her allegations, saying the incidents had left her “completely scared” and had contributed to severe mental distress, including depression and suicidal thoughts, over several years.

Modi has denied all allegations of sexual harassment and wrongdoing. In May 2023, he described the accusations as “fake and baseless”, claimed that the production had “sacked” Mistry from the show, and said that he and his team had documentary proof to support their position. In a separate interview, he stated that he considered his cast and crew “like family” and that he had “never done anything wrong to anyone”.

== Filmography ==
Year	Film / Serial	Role	Notes
1998–2001	Hum Sab Ek Hai	Producer	TV show
2004	Yeh Lamhe Judaai Ke	Actor	Film
2004–2008	Saarrthi	Producer	TV show
2008–present	Taarak Mehta Ka Ooltah Chashmah	Producer	TV show
2010–2011	Krishnaben Khakhrawala	Producer	TV show
2013–2014	Wah! Wah! Kya Baat hai!	Producer	Reality show / stand-up comedy
2013–2014	Sab Khelo Sab Jeeto	Producer	Game show
2021–present	Taarak Mehta Ka Chhota Chashmah	Producer	Animated television series

== Awards and recognition ==
- 5th National Conference organized by the HR Club
- Indian Television Academy Awards
- Indian Telly Awards
- Lion's Gold Award by Lion's Club Mumbai
