= Disha Vakani =

Indian actress (born 1978)

Disha Vakani Padia
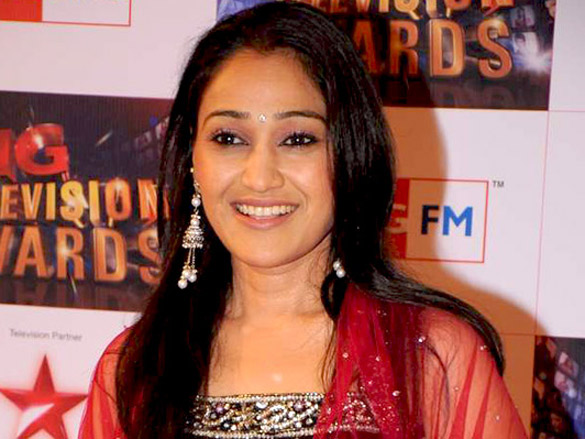
- Vakani in 2011
- Born: Disha Vakani; 17 August 1978 (age 48); Ahmedabad, Gujarat, India
- Education: Gujarat College, Ahmedabad
- Occupation: Actress
- Years active: 1997–2019
- Known for: Taarak Mehta Ka Ooltah Chashmah
- Spouse: Mayur Padia (m. 2015)
- Children: 2
- Relatives: Mayur Vakani (brother)

Disha Vakani Padia (née Vakani; born 17 August 1978); is a former Indian actress who predominantly worked in Hindi films and television. One of popular actresses of Hindi television, Vakani is widely known for her portrayal as Daya Jethalal Gada in India's longest-running sitcom, Taarak Mehta Ka Ooltah Chashmah. She is also known for her role in the films, Devdas, Mangal Pandey: The Rising and Jodhaa Akbar.

== Early life ==
Disha Vakani was born 17 August 1978 in Ahmedabad, Gujarat. Her brother, Mayur Vakani is also an actor.

== Career ==
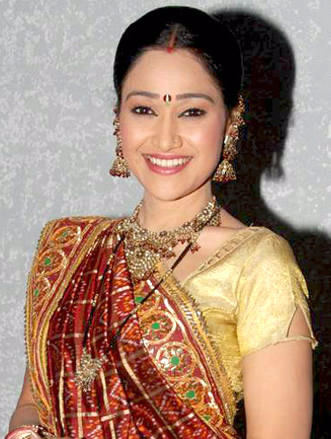
Disha Vakani on the sets of KBC as her famous role of Daya, a fictitious character in the serial Taarak Mehta Ka Ooltah Chashmah

Disha was introduced to theatre at a very young age by her father Bhim Vakani, a noted Gujarati theatre personality. Her career in acting kick-started as a child theatre-artiste with her father. She then graduated in the Dramatic arts from Gujarat College and went on to work in popular plays such as Kamal Patel v/s Dhamal Patel, Baa Retire Thai Che and Lali Lila. She has played supporting roles in Hindi films like Devdas (2002) and Jodhaa Akbar (2008). She has played the lead role of Daya "Dayaben" Jethalal Gada in SAB TV's sitcom Taarak Mehta Ka Ooltah Chashmah since 2008. Her brother Mayur Vakani also plays her on-screen brother Sundarlal or Sundar. She went on maternity leave in September 2017 and did not return to the show as of 2026.

== Personal life ==
She married a Mumbai-based chartered accountant named Mayur Padia on 24 November 2015. On 27 November 2017, the couple became parents to a baby girl. She gave birth to a baby boy in May 2022.

== Filmography ==
=== Films ===
Year	Title	Role	Language	Notes	Ref.
1997	Kamsin: The Untouched	Pinky	Hindi		
1998	Mahisagar Na Moti	Geeta	Gujarati		
1999	Pandadu Lilu Ne Rang Rato	Parul	Gujarati		
1999	Phool Aur Aag	Unknown	Hindi		
2002	Paiso Maro Parmeshwar	Unknown	Gujarati		
2002	Devdas	Sakhi	Hindi		
2005	Mangal Pandey: The Rising	Yasmin	Hindi		
2006	Jaana... Let's Fall in Love	Salma Disa	Hindi		
2008	Jodhaa Akbar	Madhavi	Hindi		
2008	C Kkompany	Asha Trivedi	Hindi	Special appearance	
2008	Love Story 2050	Maid	Hindi		

=== Television ===
Year	Title	Role	Notes	Ref.
2002	Justujoo	Mehul's makeup artist		
2003	Shubh Mangal Savadhan	Sanskriti		
2004	Khichdi	Various characters		
2004–2005	Aahat	Bina		
2005	Instant Khichdi	Nisha	Guest appearance	
2005	Hero – Bhakti Hi Shakti Hai	School Teacher		
2005	Rooh	Kajal Srivastav	Guest Appearance(Ep 14)	
2006	Resham Dankh	Kinari		
2008–2019	Taarak Mehta Ka Ooltah Chashmah	Daya Jethalal Gada		
2014	CID	Daya Jethalal Gada	Special appearance	

== Accolades ==
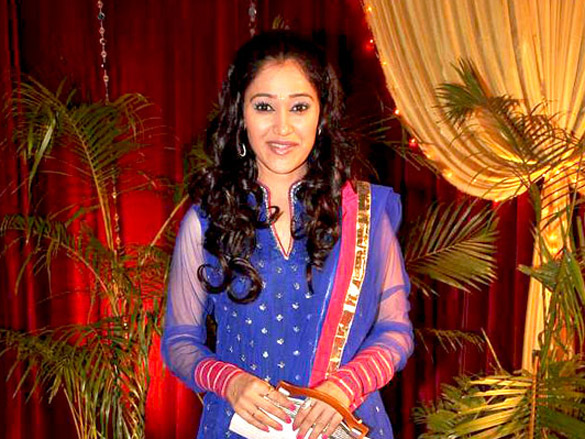
Vakani- Padia at ITA Awards, 2011

Year	Award	Category	Work	Result	Ref
2008	Indian Television Academy Awards	ITA Award for Best Actress - Comedy	Taarak Mehta Ka Ooltah Chashmah	Won	
2009	Indian Telly Awards	Best Actor in a Comic Role – Female (Popular)	Taarak Mehta Ka Ooltah Chashmah	Won	
2009	Indian Television Academy Awards	Best Actress - Comedy	Taarak Mehta Ka Ooltah Chashmah	Won	
2010	Gold Awards	Best Comic Actor (Popular)	Taarak Mehta Ka Ooltah Chashmah	Won	
2010	Indian Telly Awards	Best Actor in a Comic Role – Female (Popular)	Taarak Mehta Ka Ooltah Chashmah	Won	
2012	Nickelodeon Kids' Choice Awards India	Favorite Actress – TV	Taarak Mehta Ka Ooltah Chashmah	Won	
2014	Indian Television Academy Awards	Best Actress - Comedy	Taarak Mehta Ka Ooltah Chashmah	Won	
2015	Indian Television Academy Awards	Best Actress - Comedy	Taarak Mehta Ka Ooltah Chashmah	Won	
2016	Nickelodeon Kids' Choice Awards India	Favorite Character — TV (Female)	Taarak Mehta Ka Ooltah Chashmah	Won	
2017	Nickelodeon Kids' Choice Awards India	Favorite Actress – TV	Taarak Mehta Ka Ooltah Chashmah	Won	
