= Neela Film Productions =

Indian entertainment company

- Industry: Entertainment
- Founded: 26 August 1995; 31 years ago
- Founder: Asit Kumarr Modi
- Headquarters: Mumbai, Maharashtra, India
- Products: Television Programs
- Website: neelafilmproductions.com

Neela Film Productions Private Limited, formerly called Neela Tele Films, is a production house based in Mumbai, India. It produces fiction and non-fiction shows for various television channels.

The company was founded in 1995, and is managed and owned by Asit Kumarr Modi. Its first production was Hum Sab Ek Hain for Sony TV, and subsequently produced shows included Yeh Duniya Hai Rangeen and Meri Biwi Wonderful for Sony TV, Pyaar Mein Twist for StarPlus, and Taarak Mehta Ka Ooltah Chashmah for SAB TV (now Sony SAB).

The company later produced the fiction drama series Saarrthi for Star Plus, Krishnaben Khakhrawala for Sony TV and Hamari Saas Leela for Colors, along with the non-fiction shows Wah! Wah! Kya Baat Hai!, an Indian comic poetry series that premiered on SAB TV, and Sab Khelo Sab Jeeto, a reality game show that also aired on SAB TV.

They currently produce the situation comedy Taarak Mehta Ka Ooltah Chashmah for Sony SAB.

Neela Film Productions has been the recipient of the Indian Television Academy Awards, Indian Telly Awards, Star Guild Awards and People's Choice Awards India.

== Television ==
=== Current production ===
Year	TV Series	Network
2008–present	Taarak Mehta Ka Ooltah Chashmah	Sony SAB
2021–present	Taarak Mehta Kka Chhota Chashmah	Sony YAY!

=== Former production ===
Year	TV Series	Network	Notes
1998–2001	Hum Sab Ek Hain	Sony Entertainment Television	
2000–2001	Yeh Duniya Hai Rangeen	Sony Entertainment Television	
2002–2003	Meri Biwi Wonderful	Sony Entertainment Television	
2004–2008	Saarrthi	StarPlus	
2010–2011	Krishnaben Khakhrawala	Sony Entertainment Television	
2011	Hamari Saas Leela	Colors	
2011	Pyaar Mein Twist	Star Plus	
2012–2013	Wah! Wah! Kya Baat Hai!	SAB TV	
2013–2014	Sab Khelo Sab Jeeto	SAB TV	
