= Tarak Mehta =

Indian columnist and playwright, Humourist, columnist, playwright, satirist.

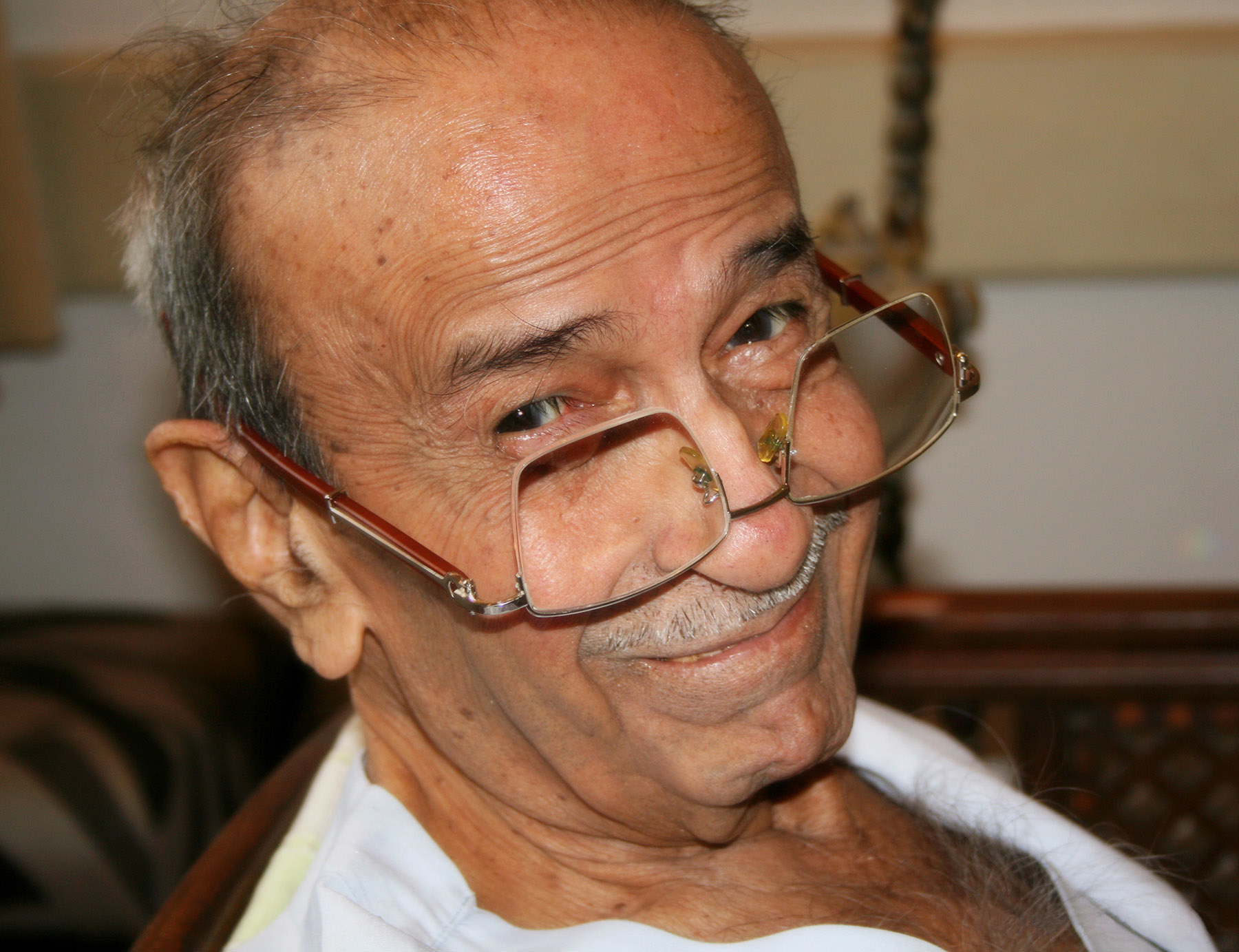
- Tarak Mehta at his residence in Ahmedabad, 2009
- Born: Tarak Janubhai Mehta; 26 December 1929; Ahmadabad, Bombay Presidency, British India (present day Gujarat, India)
- Died: 1 March 2017 (aged 87); Ahmedabad, Gujarat, India
- Occupations: Columnist; Humourist; Writer; Playwright
- Known for: Duniya Ne Undha Chasma
- Spouses: Ila Doshi (div. 1969); Indu Mehta (m. 2002)
- Children: Eshani
- Awards: Ramanlal Nilkanth Hasya Paritoshik (2017); Padma Shri (2015); Sahitya Gaurav Puraskar (2011)

Tarak Janubhai Mehta (26 December 1929 – 1 March 2017) was an Indian columnist, humourist, writer and playwright who is best known for the column Duniya Ne Undha Chasma, and was a well-known figure in Gujarati theatre.

His humorous weekly column first appeared in Chitralekha in March 1971 and looked at contemporary issues from a different perspective. He published 80 books in his whole career.

In 2008, SAB TV (now Sony SAB) – a popular entertainment channel in India – started the sitcom Taarak Mehta Ka Ooltah Chashmah based on his column, which soon became the flagship show of the channel.

== Personal life ==
Tarak Mehta belonged to the Gujarati Community. He moved to Ahmedabad, Gujarat, with his second wife, Indu, of over 30 years. His first wife, Ila who later married Manohar Doshi (died 2009), also lived in the same apartment building. He had a daughter from his first marriage, Eshani, who lives in the United States, and has two grandchildren, Kushaan and Shailee.

Mehta died at the age of 87 years on 1 March 2017 after a prolonged illness. His family donated his body to medical research.

== Awards ==
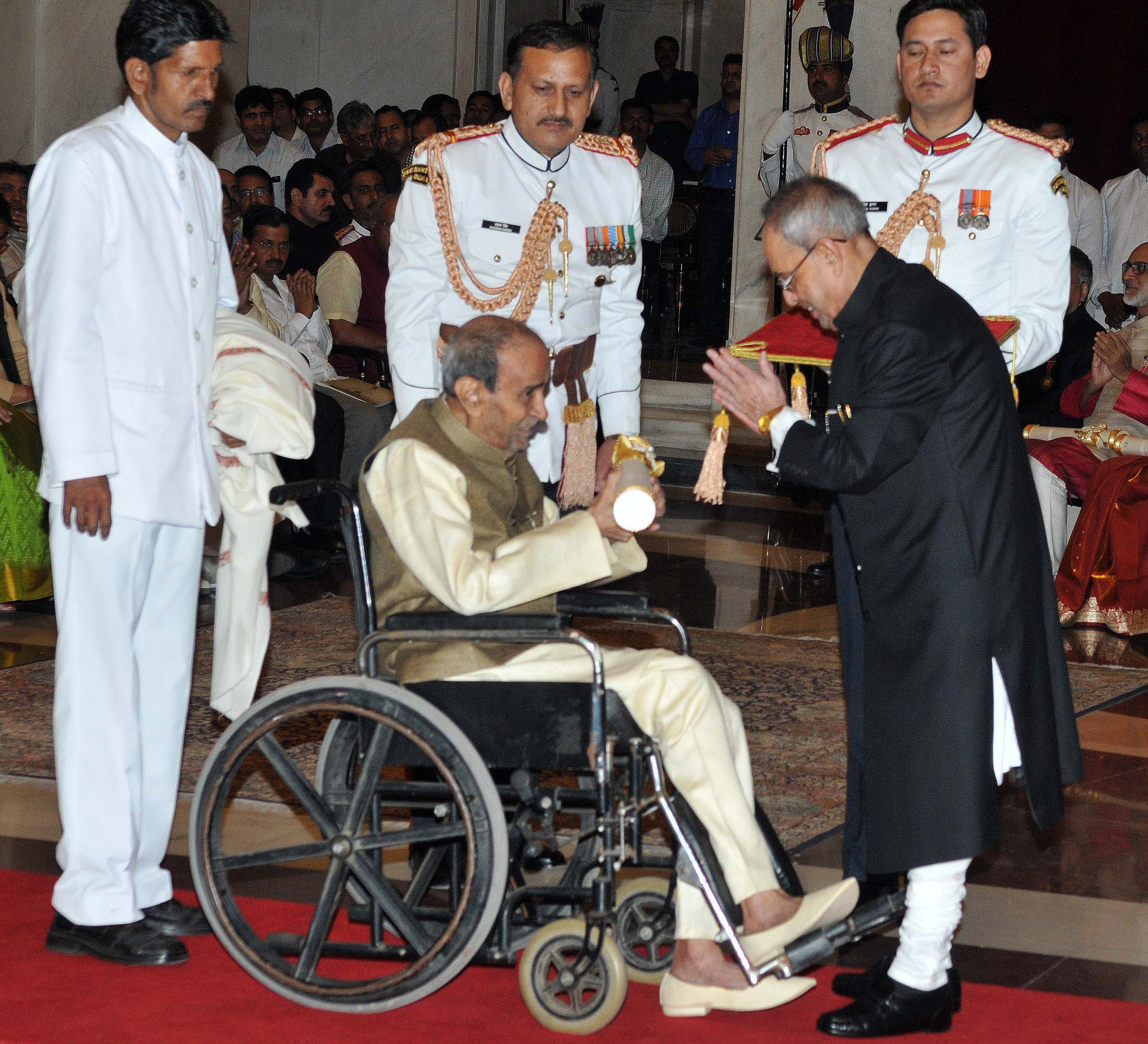
The President, Pranab Mukherjee presenting the Padma Shri Award to Tarak Mehta, at a Civil Investiture Ceremony, at Rashtrapati Bhavan, in New Delhi on 30 March 2015

Mehta was awarded the Padma Shri, the fourth highest civilian award of India, in 2015. The Gujarat Sahitya Akademi awarded him the Sahitya Gaurav Puraskar in 2011 and the Ramanlal Nilkanth Hasya Paritoshik (posthumously) in 2017.

== Bibliography ==
Novels

- Mumbai ma Mehmaan-Yajmaan Pareshan
- Mehta na Monghera Mehmaan
- Aa Duniya Panjarapole
- Tapu Tapori
- Kaise Yeh Jodi Milaye More Ram
- Betaaj Batlibaaj Popatlal Taraaj
- Albelun America, Vanthelun America
- Salo Sundarlal
- Champu-Sulu ni Jugalbandi
- Kanu Kagdo Dahitharu Lai Gayo
- Action Replay Part 1 & Part 2 (Autobiography)
- Matka King Mandve Halo Africa
- Utpatang America
- Navrani Nondhpothi
- Tarak Mehta no Tapudo
- Tarak Mehta na Undha Chashma
- 2010 na Undha Chashma
- Tapuda no Tarkhat
- Tarak Mehta ni Toli Pardesh na Pravase
- Pan Khay Popatlal Hamar
- Khurshidas Makkhan Ghase
- Dodh Dahya Tarak Mehta ni Diary
- Lade Tenu Ghar Vase
- Double Trouble
- Return Ticket
- Duniya ne Oondha Chashmah
- Champaklal Tapuni Jugalbandhi
- Ek Shaam Boss ke Naam
- Hu, Boss ane Banevi
- Naraji nu Rajinamu
- Wah America
- Tarak Mehta ni Navlikao

Natak (Plays)

- Jojo Hasi na Kadhta
- Dahpan ki Dadh
- Bandhi Mutthi Lakhni
- Ae to emaj Chale
- Ek Murakhne Evi Tev
- Tarak Mehta ni TV Natikao
- Tarak Mehta na Ekankio
- Tarak Mehta na Prahaaso
- Aath Ekankio
