= Dharti =

Dharti is a Sanskrit word meaning Earth. It may also refer to:

- Prithvi or Bhumi, Hindu goddess of Earth
- Dharti (1970 film), a 1970 Indian film by C. V. Shridhar
- Dharti (2011 film), a 2011 Indian film
- Dharti (TV actress), Indian actress

== See also ==
- Dhatri, the Hindu solar deity
