= Hiba Nawab =

Indian television actress

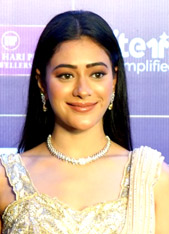
- Nawab in 2025
- Born: 14 November; Bareilly, Uttar Pradesh, India
- Occupations: Actress; model
- Years active: 2008–2009 (child actress); 2013–present
- Known for: Jijaji Chhat Per Hain; Woh Toh Hai Albelaa; Jhanak

Hiba Nawab is an Indian actress who works in Hindi television. She made her acting debut as a child artist in Ssshhhh... Phir Koi Hai in 2008. Nawab had her lead debut with Crazy Stupid Ishq in 2013, where she played Anushka Atwal. Nawab is best known for her portrayal of Amaya Mathur Gupta in Tere Sheher Mein, Pari Sinha Singh Chauhan in Meri Saasu Maa, Sheena Bakul Vasavda in Bhaag Bakool Bhaag, Elaichi Bansal Khurana in Jijaji Chhat Per Hain, Connaught Place "CP" Sharma and Chandraprabha in Jijaji Chhat Parr Koii Hai, Sayuri Sharma Choudhary in Woh Toh Hai Albelaa and Jhanak Raina Bhanushali Bose in Jhanak.

== Career ==
=== 2008-09: Early child roles ===
Born in Bareilly, Uttar Pradesh, Nawab made her acting debut as a child artist in Ssshhhh... Phir Koi Hai with the role of Dolly. Her next role was of Shweta Singh, Saloni's adoptive daughter in Saat Phere – Saloni Ka Safar. Her last appearance as a child was in Lo Ho Gayi Pooja Iss Ghar Ki. She then took a break from acting.

=== 2013-present: Breakthrough and adult leading roles ===
In 2013, Nawab made her first lead character appearance as Anushka Atwal, alongside Vishal Vashishtha in Channel V's Crazy Stupid Ishq an Indian television youth drama show. In 2015, Nawab portrayed Amaya Mathur Gupta in Star Plus's Tere Sheher Mein opposite Dhruv Bhandari. She also sang the reprised version of Dheere Dheere. In 2016, she played Pari Sinha Singh Chauhan in Zee TV's Meri Saasu Maa opposite Pearl V Puri. In 2017, she played Sheena Bakul Vasavda in Colors TV's Bhaag Bakool Bhaag opposite Jay Soni. From 2018 to 2020, she played Elaichi Bansal Khurana alongside Nikhil Khurana in Sony SAB's Jijaji Chhat Per Hain for which she won the Indian Telly Award for Best Actor In Comic Role Female Popular. In 2021, Nawab was seen playing the double role of Connaught Place "CP" Sharma and Chandraprabha in Sony SAB's Jijaji Chhat Parr Koii Hai alongside Shubhashish Jha.

From March 2022 to June 2023, Nawab played Sayuri Sharma Choudhary in Star Bharat's Woh Toh Hai Albelaa opposite Shaheer Sheikh.

From November 2023 to June 2025, Nawab played Jhanak Raina Bhanushali Bose in Star Plus's Jhanak opposite Krushal Ahuja.

Nawab is currently playing Urvashi, a lovable witch in Sony SAB's Lo Chudail Chali Sasural opposite Adhik Mehta.

== Media image ==
In 2017, Nawab was placed 19th in the Times of India's 20 Most Desirable Women on Television. In 2026, she was listed in Indian television's Reigning Under-30 Screen Queens by Variety India.

== Filmography ==
=== Television ===
As a child actor

| Year | Title | Role | Ref. |
|---|---|---|---|
| 2008 | Ssshhhh... Phir Koi Hai | Dolly | (Note: Hiba Nawab appeared as Dolly in Sister: Part 1 & Part 2 and Neha in Mirror: Part 1 & Part 2.) |
| 2008 | Ssshhhh... Phir Koi Hai | Neha | (Note: Hiba Nawab appeared as Dolly in Sister: Part 1 & Part 2 and Neha in Mirror: Part 1 & Part 2.) |
| 2008 | Saat Phere – Saloni Ka Safar | Shweta Singh | |
| 2008–2009 | Lo Ho Gayi Pooja Iss Ghar Ki | Rimjhim | |

As an adult

| Year | Title | Role | Ref. |
|---|---|---|---|
| 2013 | Crazy Stupid Ishq | Anushka "Pampi" Atwal | |
| 2015 | Tere Sheher Mein | Amaya Mathur Gupta | |
| 2016 | Meri Saasu Maa | Pari Sinha Sharma / Pari Sinha Singh Chauhan | |
| 2017 | Bhaag Bakool Bhaag | Sheena Bakul Vasavda | |
| 2018–2020 | Jijaji Chhat Per Hain | Elaichi "Ellu" Bansal Khurana | |
| 2021 | Jijaji Chhat Parr Koii Hai | Connaught Place "CP" Sharma | |
| 2021 | Jijaji Chhat Parr Koii Hai | Chandraprabha | |
| 2022–2023 | Woh Toh Hai Albelaa | Sayuri Sharma Choudhary | |
| 2023–2025 | Jhanak | Jhanak "Nutan" Raina Bhanushali Bose | |
| 2026–present | Lo Chudail Chali Sasural | Urvashi Aarav Patel | |

==== Special appearances ====
| Year | Title | Role | Ref. |
|---|---|---|---|
| 2015 | Yeh Rishta Kya Kehlata Hai | Amaya Mathur Gupta | |
| 2016 | Kumkum Bhagya | Pari Sinha | |
| 2020 | Kuch Smiles Ho Jayein... With Alia | Elaichi "Ellu" Bansal Khurana | |
| 2022 | Swayamvar – Mika Di Vohti | Sayuri Sharma Choudhary | |
| 2023 | Teri Meri Doriyaann | Jhanak Raina Bose | |
| 2023 | Pandya Store | Jhanak Raina Bose | |
| 2024 | Maati Se Bandhi Dor | Jhanak Raina Bose | |
| 2024 | Yeh Teej Badi Hai Mast Mast | Jhanak Raina Bose | |

=== Talk-shows ===
| Year | Title | Role | Note | Ref. |
|---|---|---|---|---|
| 2026 | Suffer Vs Safar | Host | Independent podcast show | |

=== Music videos ===
| Year | Title | Singer(s) | Ref. |
|---|---|---|---|
| 2021 | "Tanha Hoon" | Yasser Desai | |
| 2021 | "Oh Sanam" | Tony Kakkar, Shreya Ghoshal | |
| 2021 | "Achha Ve Achha" | Nikk | |
| 2021 | "Borla" | Diler Kharkiya | |
| 2021 | "Badnaam Kiya" | Yasser Desai | |
| 2022 | "Chabbi" | Rico | |
| 2022 | "Dil Puchta Hai" | Palak Muchhal | |
| 2022 | "Ishq Badhta Gaya" | Pawandeep Rajan | |
| 2022 | "Ishq Bezubaan" | Asees Kaur, Harshdeep Ratan | |
| 2022 | "Itni Mohabbat Karta Hoon" | Nihal Tauro | |
| 2022 | "Rabba Khaireya" | Stebin Ben, Samira Koppikar | |
| 2023 | "Kamar Mat Matka" | Diler Kharkiya, Manisha Sharma | |
| 2023 | "Rulate Ho" | RV Singh | |
| 2023 | "Beirada" | Tabish Pasha | |
| 2023 | "Wo Ishq" | Anwesshaa | |
| 2023 | "Tu Mera Dil" | Amarjeet Jaikar, Swati Prasad | |

== Discography ==
| Year | Film/Series | Song | Lyricist | Composer | Co-singer(s) | Ref. |
|---|---|---|---|---|---|---|
| 2015 | Tere Sheher Mein | "Dheere Dheere Se (Reprise)" | | | | |
| 2026 | Lo Chudail Chali Sasural | "Meri Wali Chudail Hai" | Abhinav Nagar | Mohit Dogra | Amit Mishra | |

== Awards and nominations ==
| Year | Award | Category | Show | Result | Ref. |
|---|---|---|---|---|---|
| 2018 | Indian Television Academy Awards | Best Actress - Comedy | Jijaji Chhat Per Hain | Nominated | |
| 2019 | Indian Telly Awards | Best Actress in a Comic Role | Jijaji Chhat Per Hain | Won | |
| 2025 | Indian Telly Awards | Fan Favorite Jodi (with Krushal Ahuja) | Jhanak | Won | |
| 2025 | Indian Telly Awards | Fan Favourite Star - Star Plus | Jhanak | Nominated | |

== See also ==
- List of Hindi television actresses
- List of Indian television actresses
