= Vijan =

Vijan is a surname. Notable people with the surname include:

- Dinesh Vijan, Indian film producer and director
- Rakhi Vijan, Indian actress
