= Lo Chudail Chali Sasural =

Indian Hindi-language fantasy comedy sitcom

- Also known as: Chudail Chali Sasural
- Genre: Fantasy; Comedy; Romantic drama
- Created by: Vipul D. Shah
- Inspired by: Bewitched by Sol Saks
- Written by: Hemant Kevani; Jayati Pandya; Dialogues: Virat Basoya
- Screenplay by: Hemant Kevani; Jayati Pandya; Virat Basoya
- Directed by: Ritwik Mukherjee
- Creative director: Prachi Srivaastav
- Starring: Hiba Nawab; Adhik Mehta; Kanchan Gupta; Rakhi Vijan
- Theme music composer: Uttank Vora; Urvaak Vora; Aasish Rego
- Composers: Uttank Vora; Urvaak Vora
- Country of origin: India
- Original language: Hindi
- No. of seasons: 1
- No. of episodes: 4

Production
- Producer: Vipul D. Shah
- Cinematography: Pushpank Gawde
- Editors: Dharmesh Patel; Shakti Mohanty
- Camera setup: Multi-camera
- Running time: 20–25 minutes
- Production company: Optimystix Entertainment

Original release
- Network: Sony SAB
- Release: 18 November 2026 – present

Related
- Bewitched

Lo Chudail Chali Sasural (transl. Behold, The Witch Off to Her In-laws' House) is an Indian Hindi-language fantasy comedy television series starring Hiba Nawab and Adhik Mehta in lead roles. Produced by Vipul D. Shah under Optimystix Entertainment, the series airs on Sony SAB from 18 November 2026 and streams digitally on Sony LIV. It is an official Hindi adaptation of popular American sitcom Bewitched.

== Plot ==
The show follows Urvashi, a kind-hearted witch who gives up her magical life for love and promises her husband, Aarav Patel, that she will live as an ordinary human. But her struggles with everyday life often land her in trouble, forcing her to secretly use magic to fix things, only to create even bigger chaos. Blending humour, family drama and fantasy, the show draws much of its comedy from the clash between the Patel family's everyday world and the unpredictable world of magic.

== Cast ==
=== Main ===
- Hiba Nawab as Urvashi Aarav Patel: A witch; Kamini's daughter; Aarav's wife (2026–present)
- Adhik Mehta as Aarav Patel: Vimla and Navrottam's younger son; Darshan's brother; Urvashi's husband (2026–present)

=== Recurring ===
- Rakhi Vijan as Kamini Raheja: A witch; Urvashi's mother (2026–present)
- Ashish Bhatt as Navrottam Patel: Vimla's husband; Darshan and Aarav's father; Coco's grandfather (2026–present)
- Kanchan Gupta as Vimla Patel: Chandrakant's wife; Darshan and Aarav's mother; Coco's grandmother (2026–present)
- Khanjan Thumbar as Darshan "Darshu" Patel: Vimla and Navrottam's elder son; Aarav's brother; Meenal's husband; Coco's father (2026–present)
- Reema Worah as Meenal Patel: Monica's elder sister; Jayesh's wife; Coco's mother (2026–present)
- Hassaan Syed as Coco Patel: Meenal and Darshan's son (2026–present)
- Priyanka Goswami as Monica: Meenal's younger sister (2026–present)
- Rahul Singh as Maganlal (2026–present)

== Production ==
=== Development ===
The series was announced by Sony SAB in June 2026. This supernatural romantic comedy series is inspired from Bewitched.

=== Casting ===
Hiba Nawab was roped in to play a loveable witch, Urvashi. Adhik Mehta was cast as the male lead, Aarav Patel. Alogside Nawab, Anita Hassanandani appeared as a Dayan (witch) and Tejasswi Prakash as a Naagin (snake maiden) were cast in cameo appearances.

=== Release ===
The first promo announcing the title of the show was released on 22 June 2026. Second promo with the cast was released on 10 October 2026. Lo Chudail Chali Sasural premiered on 18 November 2026, replacing Yaadein in its 8 p.m. slot.

== Music ==
The music rights of the series were acquired by Sony Music India. The theme soundtrack Meri Wali Chudail Hai sung by Amit Mishra and Hiba Nawab, making her rap debut, and composed by Mohit Dogra released on 9 November 2026 on various music streaming platforms. Later, its music video featuring Adhik Mehta and Hiba Nawab released on Sony SAB's YouTube channel.

=== Track listing ===
No.	Title	Lyrics	Music	Singer(s)	Length
1.	"Meri Wali Chudail Hai"	Abhinav Nagar	Mohit Dogra	Hiba Nawab, Amit Mishra	2:21
Total length:					2:21

== Reception ==
=== Critical response ===
Urmimala Banerjee of Variety India praised the screenplay, blending comic and the wordplay to cater younger generation and pleased with Hiba Nawab’s styling. Banerjee said that “Hiba has proven her mettle in the sitcom genre with shows like “Jijaji Chhat Per Hain” and “Jijaji Chhat Par Koi Hai,” which had a supernatural twist and she suits “Lo Chudail Chali Sasural” with her skill of delivering exaggerated expressions that suit comedy of this type”. She went into say that seasoned actor Rakhi Vijan is pitch perfect for the role and some of the best scenes are between the mother-daughter duo. Also, she noted that debutant Adhik Mehta needs a bit more experience and fine with the AI-generated visual effects.
