= Pranoti Pradhan =

Indian television and film actress

- Born: Mumbai, Maharashtra, India
- Occupation: Actress
- Years active: 1987–present
- Relatives: Pallavi Pradhan (sister)

Pranoti Pradhan is an Indian television and film actress.

== Career ==
Pranoti Pradhan started her acting career as a child artist. She played a popular story of Rabindranath Tagore named Dakghar, her role was of a boy. She used to take part in her school plays. Her career started when she was selected in a TV series named Hum paanchi ek dal ke as Kunti, these serials were broadcast on DD National at 9:30 am. She received a best child actress award for this show. After that she did a lot more serials as a child artist namely Mamaji, Khelghar, Haste Khelte. As a child artist she also did a Marathi serial named Najuka and a Kannada movie.

After that Pradhan took a break, then again started with Hindi and Marathi theatre in her college years. At that time, Pranoti did a Gujarati play. During that time, Vipul Mehta offered her a commercial Gujarati play, Pritam Khele Aankh Micholi, which she performed 17 times. After that a role in the play Rang che Raja was offered to her. This play was performed 80 times in India and in America.

In 2006, Pradhan was cast in the serial Thodi Khushi Thode Gham, telecast on Sony TV. Pradhan did many Gujarati plays including Hatt Tari ne Hath mathi gai, Ek Murakh ne evi tev, Parnela ne Puchi juo, Chaanu ne Chapanu Kai Thai nai, Vaat Bahar Jai nai, Hu, Raju ne Ruksana and Tamne maline Anand Thayo.

Pranoti Pradhan did a TV series named Vicky and Vetaal on Disney Channel, and a Life OK TV series named Zindagi Kahe Smile Please. Pradhan played the role of Asha in Firangi Bahu. Then she did the role of Ansuya Mehta in the serial Naya Mahisagar on Big Magic in 2016. Pradhan hosted a reality TV show named Aji Sunte Ho on Zee TV in 2016–2017.

== Television ==
Year	Serial	Role	Language	Channel
1987	Hum Panchi Ek Daal Ke	Kunti	Hindi	DD National
2006	Thodi Khushi Thode Gham	Bhavana Shah	Hindi	Sony TV
2006	Vicky and Vetaal	Kavita	Hindi	Disney Channel
2011	Zindagi Kahe Smile Please	Savitri Jadeja	Hindi	Life OK
2011	Firangi Bahu	Asha Desai	Hindi	Sahara One
2016	Naya Mahisagar	Ansuya Mehta	Hindi	Big Magic
2016	Khidki	Malati	Hindi	Sab TV
2016–2017	Aji Sunte Ho	Surili Sharma	Hindi	Zee TV
2018	Super Sisters - Chalega Pyar Ka Jaadu	Chitralekha	Hindi	Sab TV
2022	Shubh Laabh - Aapkey Ghar Mein	Menaka	Hindi	Sab TV
2023	Happy Family: Conditions Apply	Falguni	Hindi	Amazon Prime
