= Ladies Special =

Indian television series

- Genre: Soap opera
- Directed by: Kaushik Ghatak; Saagar Kagra; Naveen Maan
- Country of origin: India
- Original language: Hindi
- No. of seasons: 2
- No. of episodes: 293

Production
- Producers: Sanjiv Sharma; Vipul D. Shah
- Running time: 24 minutes
- Production company: Optimystix Entertainment

Original release
- Network: Sony Entertainment Television
- Release: 25 May 2009 – 16 August 2019

Ladies Special is an Indian television series that airs on Sony Entertainment Television. It premiered on 25 May 2009 along with a host of other new TV shows, as part of a major revamp by Sony TV. The show is about the lives of a group of ladies who travel by the Ladies Special suburban railway train in Mumbai. Season 1 went off air on 14 December 2009. Season 2 premiered on 27 November 2018 with new story and a new cast, Season 2 ended on 16 August 2019.

== Series overview ==
Season	Episodes	Originally aired	
Season	Episodes	First aired	Last aired
1	104	25 May 2009	14 December 2009
2	189	27 November 2018	16 August 2019

== Plot ==
=== Season 1 ===
The story is set in Mumbai and is a take on the lives and challenges faced by women in big cities and how they sometimes find hope, encouragement and companionship in the most unlikely places. In this case, the protagonists are four women – Shubha Joshi, Nanda Shinde, Bubbly Chaddha, and Pooja Singh – who travel to work and back by the Ladies Special train,

=== Season 2 ===
Three passengers, Meghna, Prarthana and Bindu meet in a Mumbai Ladies Special train and become friends, sharing their problems with each other. Meghna Nikade is a Marathi woman, with a positive, never-give-up attitude. Her family consists of her husband, Mandar and two kids Swapna, Sachin and father-in-law. She belongs to a lower-middle-class family. She wishes to run a garment company, Swapna Garments, with her best friend, Jyoti.

Prarthana Kashyap is a stolid Bihari 30 year old and hardworking woman who works in a telecom company. Her family consists of her mother Rachna, her father, who is unemployed and a brother, Puneet, a cab driver. Although she is short tempered, she is soft natured and is kind hearted. She is married to Viraj Parimal.

Bindu Desai is a beautiful, vivacious and a Gujarati housewife. Her husband Dr. Amar Desai is a cardiologist by profession. Amar was forced to marry Bindu, but he actually loves another woman, Dr. Kangana Rajawat. Amar confesses about Kangana to Bindu, who accepts the truth without any hesitation, much to the surprise of Amar. Though Bindu's married life is not smooth, she doesn't show her uneasiness and always carries a smile on her face. Her family consists of Mota Papa and Mota Mami.

These three friends face challenges in their marital lives, but manage to solve them. Finally Megha and Mandar have another daughter, who named after Bindu. Bindu and Amar are reunited while Kangana and Puneet are married. The serial ends with a happy note.

Episode No.	Title	Air Date
1	The Local Train Life	27 November 2018
2	Deep-Seated Pain	28 November 2018
3	Trust	29 November 2018
4	An Apology	30 November 2018
5	When Ego Speaks Up	3 December 2018
6	Dreams Don't Turn To Dust	4 December 2018
7	Anything Worth Holding Onto	5 December 2018
8	Life Takes A Turn	6 December 2018
9	A Friend In Need	7 December 2018
10	A Helping Hand	10 December 2018
11	The White Lies	11 December 2018
12	The Hurdles Of Life	12 December 2018
13	The Baby Steps	13 December 2018
14	Life's Challenges	14 December 2018
15	Things That Really Matter	17 December 2018
16	Stages Of Existence	18 December 2018
17	Tarnished Dreams	19 December 2018
18	Crossroads Of Life	20 December 2018
19	The Truth	21 December 2018
20	A Tough Decision	24 December 2018
21	The Search	25 December 2018
22	Closer To The Truth	26 December 2018
23	Happiness and Sorrow	27 December 2018
24	The New Year Party	28 December 2018
25	The Underlying Truth	31 December 2018
26	Veeraj's Secret	1 January 2019
27	Self Respect	2 January 2019
28	The Presentation	3 January 2019
29	Confused Heart	4 January 2019
30	The Struggles Of Life	7 January 2019
31	The Small Things	8 January 2019
32	Paying The Price	9 January 2019
33	The Phone Call	10 January 2019
34	When Push Comes To Shove	11 January 2019
35	Unexpected Turn Of Events	14 January 2019
36	Misguided	15 January 2019
37	For Friendship	16 January 2019
38	Bindu Sets Everything Right	17 January 2019
39	The Dinner Date	18 January 2019
40	The Calm Before the Storm	21 January 2019
41	A Ray Of Hope	22 January 2019
42	Bindu's Decision	23 January 2019
43	Crisis	24 January 2019
44	The Harsh Truth	25 January 2019
45	The Divorce Papers	28 January 2019
46	Hidden Talent	29 January 2019
47	Singing Sensation	30 January 2019
48	Trouble Is Here	31 January 2019
49	Kangana's Nasty Move	1 February 2019
50	Tangled Relations	4 February 2019
51	Bindu's Decision	5 February 2019
52	A Life-Changing Decision	6 February 2019
53	Sudden Turn of Events	7 February 2019
54	Unfulfilled Dreams	8 February 2019
55	Kangana's Secret	11 February 2019
56	Amar Questions Kangana's Intention	12 February 2019
57	The Truth	13 February 2019
58	At Crossroads	14 February 2019
59	Determination And Passion	15 February 2019
60	Relations Take A New Turn	18 February 2019
61	Forgiveness	19 February 2019
62	Tough Decisions	20 February 2019
63	When There Is A Will There Is A Way	21 February 2019
64	The Opportunity	22 February 2019
65	Prarthana's Dream	25 February 2019
66	The Surprise Call	26 February 2019
67	Dreams Come True	27 February 2019
68	Bappi Da's Surprise	28 February 2019
69	Tensions Build	1 March 2019
70	Truth Has Its Own Way	4 March 2019
71	True Relations	5 March 2019
72	Resolving Differences	6 March 2019
73	The Revival	7 March 2019
74	Happy Women's Day	8 March 2019
75	The Accident	11 March 2019
76	Prarthana's Recording	12 March 2019
77	Prarthana's Dilemma	13 March 2019
78	Amar's Life On The Line	14 March 2019
79	Deep-Seated Feelings	15 March 2019
80	Let's Prepare For Holi	18 March 2019
81	Holi Celebrations	19 March 2019
82	Nothing Breaks Like A Heart	20 March 2019
83	The Outburst	21 March 2019
84	Prarthana Is Missing	22 March 2019
85	Prarthana's Anger	25 March 2019
86	The Disguise	26 March 2019
87	Swapnil Joshi Boards the Train	27 March 2019
88	Swapnil Joshi's Big Order	28 March 2019
89	Kangana's Dilemma	29 March 2019
90	A New Contract For Swapna Garments	1 April 2019
91	Bindu Faces Kangana	2 April 2019
92	Viraj With A Plan	3 April 2019
93	Viraj Meets His In-Laws	4 April 2019
94	Controversial Viraj	5 April 2019
95	Mixed Emotions	8 April 2019
96	A Rift In Swapna Garments	9 April 2019
97	Viraj Proposes	10 April 2019
98	Bindu's Positivity	11 April 2019
99	Amar Is Heartbroken	12 April 2019
100	Despair And Hope	15 April 2019
101	Turmoils Everywhere	16 April 2019
102	Viraj Feels Guilty	17 April 2019
103	Jyoti Comes Back	18 April 2019
104	Prarthana's Worries	19 April 2019
105	Amar Loses Hope For His Hand	22 April 2019
106	Determination	23 April 2019
107	Viraj's Resignation And Amar's Fear	24 April 2019
108	A Unique Proposal	25 April 2019
109	Viraj And Prarthana	26 April 2019
110	A Special Wedding	29 April 2019
111	Secret Wedding	30 April 2019
112	Helping Hand	1 May 2019
113	Operation Day	2 May 2019
114	Punit Knows The Truth	3 May 2019
115	Differences Exist Till Now	6 May 2019
116	Tough Times	7 May 2019
117	Prayers And Wishes	8 May 2019
118	Amar Gains Consciousness	9 May 2019
119	Never Ending Fights	10 May 2019
120	Relations	13 May 2019
121	Bindu's Proposal Gets Refused	14 May 2019
122	Bindu Irritates Everyone	15 May 2019
123	Meghna's Pregnancy	16 May 2019
124	Happiness All Around	17 May 2019
125	Amar's Operation	20 May 2019
126	Meghna Gets Emotional	21 May 2019
127	Loss In Parimal Industry	22 May 2019
128	Dinner With Kangana	23 May 2019
129	Is Mandar Back	24 May 2019
130	Meghana And Her Grief	27 May 2019
131	Point Of View	28 May 2019
132	Viraj's Father Is Dead	29 May 2019
133	Bindu's Promise	30 May 2019
134	Confusion	31 May 2019
135	Groom For Bindu	3 June 2019
136	Interview	4 June 2019
137	Meghana's Application Is Rejected	5 June 2019
138	Meghana Makes A Mistake	6 June 2019
139	Amar Gets Upset	7 June 2019
140	Bindu's Biodata	10 June 2019
141	Meghana Is Upset	11 June 2019
142	Meghana's Refusal	12 June 2019
143	Bindu's Matrimony Profile	13 June 2019
144	Problem Faced By Viraj's Mother	14 June 2019
145	Mandar Doubts Ram	17 June 2019
146	Marriage Proposals For Bindu	18 June 2019
147	Bindu's Pain	19 June 2019
148	Ladies Exchanging News	20 June 2019
149	The Guilt	21 June 2019
150	Marriage Preparations	24 June 2019
151	Kangana Having Second Thoughts	25 June 2019
152	A New Car	26 June 2019
153	Bindu's Date	27 June 2019
154	Bindu's Father Gets Shocked	28 June 2019
155	Wedding Date	1 July 2019
156	Perfect Groom	2 July 2019
157	Prospect For Bindu	3 July 2019
158	Disputes Amongst Everyone	4 July 2019
159	Bindu's Expectations	5 July 2019
160	Meghana's Enemies	8 July 2019
161	Confused Amar	9 July 2019
162	Umedh's Expectations	10 July 2019
163	Roses For Bindu	11 July 2019
164	The Mice Drama	12 July 2019
165	Mandar's Pride	15 July 2019
166	Perfect Groom For Bindu	16 July 2019
167	A Ticket Checker's Advice	17 July 2019
168	Meghna Is Heartbroken	18 July 2019
169	Meghna Gets Blamed	19 July 2019
170	Amar Shocks Kangana	22 July 2019
171	Bindu Reaches Home	23 July 2019
172	Meghna In Deep Trouble	24 July 2019
173	Amar Knows The Truth	25 July 2019
174	Amar's Confession	26 July 2019
175	Bindu's Memory Loss	29 July 2019
176	Amar's Guilt	30 July 2019
177	Mandar And Meghna Take A Huge Step	31 July 2019
178	Bindu Is Confused	1 August 2019
179	Megha And Mandar Are Shocked	2 August 2019
180	Bindu's MRI Reports	5 August 2019
181	Bindu's Subconscious Connection	6 August 2019
182	Police On The Train	7 August 2019
183	Meghna's Baby Shower Ceremony	8 August 2019
184	Trouble At The Ceremony	9 August 2019
185	Meghna's Attempt Turns Hazardous	12 August 2019
186	Bindu Does Not Want To Give Up	13 August 2019
187	Knowing One Another	14 August 2019
188	Bindu's Illness	15 August 2019
189	True Luck And Happiness	16 August 2019

== Cast ==
=== Season 1 ===
- Neena Gupta as Shubha Joshi - A married woman who realizes a dark secret about her marriage.
- Shilpa Tulaskar as Nanda Shinde - Mother of teenaged children, trying to maintain balance between work and the challenges faced by her children
- Ashita Dhawan as Bubbly Chaddha - the happy go lucky one, who smiles despite the financial hardships she faces
- Payel Sarkar as Pooja Singh - Caught in an abusive relationship.
- Fatima Sana Shaikh as Nanda Shinde's daughter Geeti
- Sreejita De as Shivangi
- Sandeep Kulkarni as Shivam Shinde
- Akash Khurana as Vipul Joshi
- Harsh Chhaya as Karan Singh
- Satish Sharma as Mintoo Chaddha
- Shailesh Gulabani as Abhay
- Varun Badola as Vinay Josh

=== Season 2 ===
- Girija Oak Godbole as Meghna Nikade – Mandar's wife; Swapna, Sachin and Jr. Bindu's mother; Prarthana and Bindu's friend. She is an optimistic women, who makes sure that her family is happy. She lives in a lower middle class colony in Virar.
- Chhavi Pandey as Prarthana Kashyap Parimal – Rachana's daughter; Puneet's sister; Viraj's wife; Meghna and Bindu's friend. She is a stolid Bihari woman and works at a telecommunication company in Khar and lives in middle class colony in Borivali.
- Bijal Joshi as Bindu Desai – Amar's wife; Meghna and Prarthana's friend. She is a cheerful Gujarati woman married to a doctor who loves another woman. She works as a mehendi artist in weddings and lives in a high-rise apartment in Goregaon.
- Vishnu Bholwani as Mandar Nikade – Meghna's husband; Swapna, Sachin and Jr. Bindu's father. He is an honest, hard working and a supportive to Meghna.
- Sahil Chaddha as Viraj Parimal – Indrajit's son; Prarthana's husband; He is a rich intern who works under Prarthana.
- Ojas Rawal as Dr. Amar Desai – Bindu's husband; Kangana's ex-fiancé; He is a heart surgeon at Jeevandeep Hospital on SV Road.
- Arvind Vaidya as Mr. Nikade – Mandar's father; Swapna, Sachin and Jr. Bindu's grandfather. He is supportive to Meghna.
- Dilip Darbar as Mota Papa – Amar's uncle. He is supportive to Bindu.
- Jiya Mustafa as Dr. Kangana Rajawat Kashyap – Amar's ex-fiancée; Puneet's wife. She is a Pediatrician at New Life Hospital. She tried to ruin Amar and Bindu's marriage, but later repents and marries Puneet.
- Aditya Ranvijay Sidhu as Puneet Kashyap – Rachana's son; Prathana's brother; Kangana's husband. He worked as a cab driver to support his family. He married with Kangana finally.
- Inderjeet Sagoo as Subodh – Prarthana's former love interest
- Parveen Kaur as Rachana Kashyap – Prarthana and Puneet's mother. She is a simple housewife who tries to manages everything.
- Trishla Mehta as Swapna Nikade – Meghna and Mandar's elder daughter; Sachin and Jr. Bindu's sister.
- Archisman Pal as Sachin Nikade – Meghna and Mandar's son; Swapna and Jr. Bindu's brother.
- Neha Chandra as Jyoti Shukla – Meghna's best friend and business partner; Ram's wife.
- Sandeep Kapoor as Ram Shukla – Jyoti's husband. He was in prison and Meghna helped him to release.
- Dip Patel as Anuj Desai- Younger brother to Dr.Amar Desai who lives abroad.
