= Me Aajji Aur Sahib =

- Created by: Shakuntalam Telefilms
- Directed by: Dinesh Mahadev
- Creative director: Nitin Dwivedi
- Starring: See below
- Country of origin: India
- Original language: Hindi
- No. of seasons: 1
- No. of episodes: 55

Production
- Producers: Neelima Bajpai; Shyamasish Bhattacharya
- Production location: Mumbai
- Running time: 23 minutes
- Production company: Shakuntalam Telefilms

Original release
- Network: Imagine TV
- Release: 6 February – 11 May 2012

Me Aaji Aur Saheb (transl. I, my Grandmother and Husband) is an Indian soap opera on Imagine TV. The serial covered the relationship between grandparents and their grandchildren. Its broadcast began on 6 February 2012, and ended on 11 May 2012, due to Imagine TV's abrupt shutdown.

== Plot ==
The show is set against the backdrop of Ushodaya colony and highlights the essence of relationships between a grandmother, her grandchild and their Saheb that triumphs all obstacles. Me Aajji Aur Sahib showcased how different relationships grow, mature and evolve with time, circumstances and age.

== Ratings ==
The show opened to a TRP of 0.8 and continued getting TRPs in a range of 0.5 to 0.8. It was also the channels 3rd best show in 2012.

== Cast and characters ==
Actor	Character
Reem Sheikh	Megha
Smita Oak	Vasudha aka "Ajji"
Sandit Tiwari	Vishwaas aka "Saheb"
Meenal Pendse	Nupur aka Maalkin Bai and Vishwaas's Aai
Shreya More	Shashi Megha’s aunt
Rajendra Shirsatkar	Shrikant Megha’s uncle
Yug	Tushar – Megha's cousin brother
Suhasini Paranjpe	Archana – Vishwaas's aunt
