= Professor Pyarelal (TV series) =

- Genre: Situational comedy
- Created by: Rajeev Tandon
- Written by: Imtiyaz Patel
- Directed by: Kapil Kapoor
- Starring: See below
- Theme music composer: Anand Sharma; Rajeev Tandon
- Country of origin: India
- Original language: Hindi
- No. of seasons: 1
- No. of episodes: 52

Production
- Producer: Rajeev Tandon
- Camera setup: Multi-camera
- Running time: Approx. 19 minutes
- Production company: RT Entertainment

Original release
- Network: Zee TV
- Release: 12 August 1999

Professor Pyarelal is an Indian situational comedy series which premiered on 12 August 1999 on Zee TV.

== Overview ==
This is the story of an absent minded professor who, besides other things, even forgets his own name and address causing confusion in his family and neighbourhood. This story completely revolves around Professor Pyarelal and it shows that how due to his forgetful nature gets into a lot of problem which makes everybody laugh.

== Cast ==
- Ashok Saraf as Professor Pyarelal
- Priya Tendulkar / Shoma Anand as Sajani
- Rakhee Tandon as Kiran
- Vishal Singh as Jackie
