= Thodi Khushi Thode Gham =

- A promotional logo image of "Thodi Khushi Thode Gham".
- Created by: Sony Entertainment Television; Diamond Pictures
- Written by: Amit Aaryan , Bhavesh mandaliya
- Directed by: ??
- Starring: See below
- Opening theme: "Thodi Khushi Thode Gham" by ??
- Country of origin: India
- No. of seasons: 1
- No. of episodes: 338

Production
- Producers: Vinta Nanda, Piyush Gupta & Jatin Sethi
- Running time: approx. 25 minutes

Original release
- Network: Sony Entertainment Television India
- Release: 24 April 2006 – 6 December 2007

Thodi Khushi Thode Gham (transl. Some happiness some sadness) is an Indian soap opera about the battle of the two genders that aired five days a week on Sony TV from 24 April 2006 until 6 December 2007. The show was created by Vinta Nanda, Piyush Gupta and Jatin Sethi and was produced by their production company Diamond Pictures.

== Plot ==
The story mainly focuses on Sneha, who is the youngest daughter-in-law of the Shah family; her battle is against her father-in-law Mansukh Lal Shah. Mansukh believes that men should be dominant over women at all times, whereas Sneha believes that both should have equal rights. Sneha is married to Pranav, who is very strong-minded and is a good son. Sneha is married in a joint family, which consists of a sweet, strong-minded but shy mother (Daya), a sweet and gentle natured daughter-in-law (Jyoti), a sweet smart gynecologist doctor turned housewife (Bhavna), a strong-minded son (Amar), a dedicated son (Manoj), a cool, modern son (Karan), a nosy aunt (Kanta Ben), an apprentice of an uncle (Bhagu Mamaji), two little children (Alisha and Bittu), a teenage daughter with big dreams (Hetal) together with loving but funny servants (Manjit and Santu). That is the Shah family, a Jain joint family living together in a male-dominated home; but with Sneha's arrival things start to go haywire.

After Sneha is married, her bhabhis (sisters-in-law) Jyoti, Bhavna, and Daya challenge Sneha to change her behavior and attitude in two months because their father-in-law is a very strict man with many rules which govern their lives. Sneha is determined to open the eyes of the other women of the household, but Mansukh is always two steps ahead of her. This show depicts how Sneha tries to change her in-laws, especially the father-in-law's behavior and thoughts about women in general. Sneha is successful after many ups and downs.

== Cast ==
- Deepa Parab as Sneha Shah
- Amit Jain as Pranav Shah
- Arvind Rathod as Mansukh Lal Shah/Bapuji
- Zankana Sheth as Daya Shah/Maa
- Aliraza Namdar as Amar Shah
- Sejal Shah as Jyoti Shah
- Sarvadaman as Bittu Shah
- Ayushi as Alisha Shah
- Kapil Soni as Manoj Shah
- Pranoti Pradhan as Bhavna Shah
- Ragini Nandwani as Hetal Shah
- Pratap Sachdev as Karan Shah
- Kalpana Diwan as Kanta ben/Faiba
- Harish Patel as Bhangu/Mamaji
- Muskaan Nancy James as Sapna Shah

== Crew ==
- Abhishek Vakil - Assistant Director
- Amit Sharma - Supervising Producer
- Tanveer Alam - Executive Producer
- Sushil Jain - Scheduler
- Vinta Nanda, Piyush Gupta and Jatin Sethi - Producers

== Reception ==
Rediff.com stated, "A simple storyline and impressive performances get this serial a slot in the Top Ten New Serials list."
