= Mizhirandilum (TV series) =

Indian Malayalam Television series

- Genre: Drama
- Written by: Dialogues: Murali Nellanad
- Directed by: A.M. Naseer; Kurup Maraarikulam; Riju Nair
- Starring: See below
- Country of origin: India
- Original language: Malayalam
- No. of episodes: 565

Production
- Camera setup: Multi-camera
- Running time: 20–22 minutes
- Production company: Classic Frame Productions

Original release
- Network: Zee Keralam
- Release: 2 January 2023 – 11 August 2024

Related
- Kalavari Kodalu Kanaka Mahalakshmi; Thirumangalyam; Tu Hi Re Dil Mein; Tumi Achho Tai

Mizhi Randilum (transl. In both Eyes) is an Indian Malayalam-language television series that aired on Zee Keralam from 2 January 2023 to 11 August 2024. It is available on the streaming platform ZEE5. Directed by A M Nazeer, the series starred Megha Mahesh, Salmanul Faris and Vaishnavi Satheesh in lead roles. It is loosely based on Kannada series Lakshmi Baramma

== Synopsis ==
Lakshmi, an orphan, has always been ill-treated by her stepmother. She meets Sanjay, a prospective groom, but destiny deals a cruel blow to her once again.

== Cast ==
=== Main ===
- Megha Mahesh as Lakshmi a.k.a. Lechu/ Ammu
- Salmanul Faris (episode 1–487)/ Navaneeth Saju ( Episode 488–565) as Sanjay Panicker a.k.a. Sanju
  - Son of Mukundan and Sridevi
- Vaishnavi Satheesh Swathy a.k.a. Sreekutty
  - Daughter of Kanchana and Prabha

=== Recurring ===
- Rajendran N as muthassan
  - Father of Mukundan, Kavitha, Kanchana, Kaveri
- Maya Moushmi as Sridevi Mukundan
  - Sanju's mother
- Sanal Krishna as Sachi
  - Sanju's friend & he loves Lechu
- Vijayakumari Ramesh as Anandavally
  - Lachu's stepmother, Narendran's aunt, Arjun and Kunjootan's mother
- Maneesh Krishna as Arjun
  - Eldest son of Anandavally
- Akash Mahesh as Nanduttan
  - Son of Arjun and Sreeja
- Archana Renjith as Shreeja
  - Arjun's wife and Anandavally's daughter in law
- Aswin Puthiyaveetil as Narendran thampi
  - Panchayat president, nephew of Anandavally who wishes to marry Lechu
- Abhisree as Kunjoottan
  - Anandavally's second son
- Maya Vishwanath/ Karthika Kannan as Kanchana
  - Mukundan's sister and Swathy's mother who hates Sridevi
- Rahul Mohan as Prabhachandran
  - Kanchana's husband
- Blessy Kurian/ Sree Padma as Kavitha
  - Mukundan's second sister who is unmarried as her marriage was called off
- Akhil Chitrangathan as Raju, domestic help
- Sunitha as Vasumathi, muthassi
  - Mother of Mukundan, Kavitha, kanchana, kaveri
- Divya Yeshodharan/ Kezia Susan Joseph/ Anjusree Bhadran as Kaveri
  - Mukundan's youngest sister
- Unknown as Dineshan, Kaveri's husband
- Drishya MS Nair as Lechu's friend
- Ratheesh / Tony as Mukundan, died
- Yehia khader as Gautam, Kavitha's illegitimate partner
- Amith as Sethu madhavan; Sachi's father
- Varada Jishin as Avanthika, Sachi's sister in law
- Sachdev Pillai as Sandeep, Sachi's younger brother
- Nazreen Nazer as Sachi's younger sister
- Bindu Ramakrishnan as Balamaniyamma
- Shilpa Nair as Sanjana, Daksha's daughter
- Manju Satheesh as Daksha
- Sini Prasad as Mallika
- Sreelakshmi as Sharadamma
- Appani Sarath as Himself
- Mariya Prince as Archana, Sachi's wife
- Pradeep Prabhakar as CID
- Mithun Sayanth as Kichan a.k.a. Sanjay, Lechu's fake husband
- Abhijith MK as Govind / Shiva, who loves and marries Lechu

=== Mahasangamam episodes ===
- Sreelakshmi as Sharada
- Mersheena Neenu as Shalini
- Devika Pillai as Sharika
- Prabhin as Vishnu
- Poornima Anand as Sathyabhama
- Haritha Nair as Susmitha
- Saji G Nair as Raghavan Nair
- Surjith Purohit as Arjun
- Krishnapriya as Vasumathi
- Kajal Girish as Preethi Arjunan
- Kishore as Drama Juniors manager

== Crossover ==
Kudumbashree Sharada and Mizhi Randilum were interconnected for one week together in the quest to find the missing Lachu who is saved by Saradamma in Kudumbashree hotel.

== Adaptations ==
| Language | Title | Original release | Network | Last aired | Notes |
|---|---|---|---|---|---|
| Malayalam | Mizhi Randilum മിഴി രണ്ടിലും | 2 January 2023 | Zee Keralam | 11 August 2024 | Original |
| Hindi | Tu Hi Re Dil Mein तू ही रे दिल में | 15 June 2026 | Zee TV | Ongoing | Remake |

== Spin-off ==
=== Mangalyam ===
A spin-off of Mizhirandilum and Shyamambaram aired on 4 September 2023 and ended on 25 September 2026, where Sachi and family from Mizhi Randilum and Archana and family from Shyamambaram plays the central characters. It depicts the married life of Sachi and Archana. This is the first ever spin-off in Malayalam Television industry.
