= Vipul D. Shah =

Indian television producer and writer

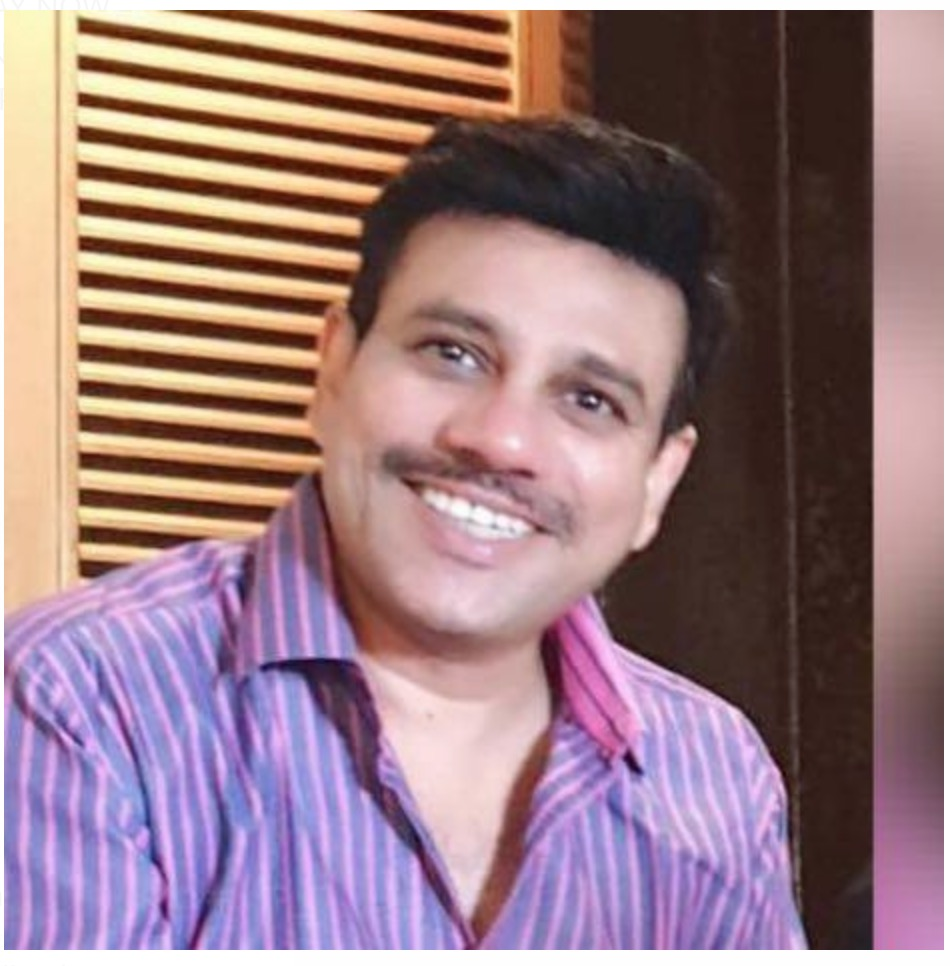
- Occupation: Television producer
- Years active: 2004–present
- Known for: Baal veer, Comedy Nights Bachao, Kya Haal, Mr. Paanchal?, Crime Patrol, Ladies Special, Rising Star

Vipul D. Shah is an Indian television producer and writer known for fictional and fantasy shows like Baalveer, Ladies Special and Kya Haal, Mr. Paanchal? and reality TV shows like Comedy Circus, Comedy Nights Bachao, Rising Star and Laughter Chefs – Unlimited Entertainment. He is also the founding chairman and managing director at Optimystix Entertainment.

Shah has received several recognitions for his work, like the Indian Television Academy Awards (ITA) under the best director category in 2009.

== Early life ==
Shah comes from a Gujarati Jain family in a small town in Gujarat called Parnala.

== Career ==
Shah started his career by writing and directing Gujarati serials. He made his debut as a writer with the Anand Mahendroo directed Dekh Bhai Dekh, for which he won the TV and Video World best writer award. He also worked on numerous comedy shows such as Philips Top 10, Battle of Bollywood, Asha Parekh's Daal Mein Kala, I Love You and the newly announced soap Lekin on SABe TV. Shah was the writer of the Bollywood film Rehna Hai Tere Dil Mein, produced by Vashu Bhagnani, which is the remake of a Tamil film Minnale, which was also written by him.

== Filmography ==
Key
| † | Denotes films and series that have not yet been released |

=== Films ===
| Year | Title | Role | Notes |
|---|---|---|---|
| 2022 | Double XL | Producer | |
| 2023 | OMG 2 | Producer | |
| 2024 | Khel Khel Mein | Producer | |
| 2024 | Vicky Vidya Ka Woh Wala Video | Producer | |

=== Television ===
The following is the list of television shows written and produced by Vipul D. Shah

| Year | Show |
|---|---|
| 2004–2005 | Ye Meri Life Hai |
| 2009–2012 | Sajan Re Jhoot Mat Bolo |
| 2009 | Ladies Special |
| 2009 | Dekh India Dekh |
| 2010–2011 | Papad Pol |
| 2010–2012 | Saas Bina Sasural |
| 2011 | Oye Bunty Babloo Oye |
| 2011–2012 | Don't Worry Chachu |
| 2011–2012 | Zindagi Kahe – Smile Please |
| 2012 | Golmaal Hai Bhai Sab Golmaal Hai |
| 2012–2016 | Baal Veer |
| 2013 | Chhanchhan |
| 2013–2014 | Firangi Bahu |
| 2014 | Pritam Pyare Aur Woh |
| 2014 | SET MAX Fillers – Bitu Bak Bak |
| 2014–2016 | Comedy Classes |
| 2015 | 2025 Jaane Kya Hoga Aage |
| 2015 | Maan Na Maan Mein Tera Mehmaan |
| 2015 | Code Red Chakravyuh |
| 2016 | Krishnadasi |
| 2016 | Dr. Madhumati On Duty |
| 2016–2017 | Hoshiyar… Sahi Waqt, Sahi Kadam |
| 2017–2018 | Sajan Re Phir Jhooth Mat Bolo |
| 2017–2019 | Kya Hal Mr. Panchal |
| 2018 | Super Sisters - Chalega Pyar Ka Jaadu |
| 2018 | Ladies Special Season 2 |
| 2019–2020 | Carry on Alia |
| 2019–2021 | Baalveer Returns |
| 2021 | Zee Comedy Show |
| 2021–2022 | Thoda sa Baadal Thoda sa Paani |
| 2022 | Anandibaa Aur Emily |
| 2023 | Baalveer 3 |
| 2024 | Baalveer 4 |
| 2024 | Madness Machayenge – India Ko Hasayenge |
| 2024–2026 | Laughter Chefs – Unlimited Entertainment |
| 2024–2025 | Tulsi – Hamari Badi Sayani |
| 2026–present | Lo Chudail Chali Sasural |

== Awards and recognition ==
- 2009: Indian Television Academy Awards (ITA) under the best director category.
- 2025: Indian Telly Awards under Best Producer (Non Fiction) for Laughter Chefs – Unlimited Entertainment.

== See also ==
- Suhaib Ilyasi
- Indian Film and TV Producers Council
- Ekta Kapoor
