= Kya Haal, Mr. Paanchal? =

- Genre: Sitcom
- Created by: Vipul D. Shah
- Written by: Hemant Kewani; Vipul D Shah; Virat Basoia
- Directed by: Kedar Shinde
- Starring: See below
- Opening theme: "Kya Haal, Mr. Paanchal"
- Country of origin: India
- Original language: Hindi
- No. of seasons: 2
- No. of episodes: 424

Production
- Producer: Vipul D Shah
- Camera setup: Multiple cameras
- Running time: 21 minutes
- Production company: Optimystix Entertainment

Original release
- Network: Star Bharat
- Release: 28 August 2017 – 21 January 2019

Kya Haal, Mr. Paanchal? (also known as Five Wives of Mr. Paanchal) is an Indian Hindi television sitcom that aired on Star Bharat. The story is about a mother Kunti Devi who demands a perfect daughter-in-law with five qualities, from Shiv Ji for her son Kanhaiya. However, as a result of a strange twist she ends up with five daughters-in-laws with one quality each. It also airs in Pakistan and Nepal as Mr. Kanhaiya Paanchal ki Paanch Patniya.

== Plot ==
This story is based on how a mother, Kunti Devi's desire turns into disappointment. The five qualities she requires in her daughter-in-law are beauty, wisdom, romance, culinary skills and religious devotion. With the blessing of lord Shiva, Kanhaiya was married to Pari (meaning fairy- beautiful), Prarthana (meaning prayer), Panjiri (a kind of north Indian food), Prema (meaning love) and then Pratibha (intelligence) - with qualities matching with their names. The plot is inspired by the story of Draupadi, who had requested Lord Shiva in her previous life to be granted a husband with great qualities, but erred by repeating each quality five times and therefore was granted the boon of five husbands. As a result, the band of Mr.Kanhaiya and his mother Kunti is played. The Paanchal family lives in Meerut.

The Second Season (Second Innings) was going on air from 23 October 2018 to 21 January 2019, where Kunti's new greed of having another quality in each of her bahu leads to Lord Shiva fulfilling it by giving a boon of 5 children to the daughters-in-law that is Buddhi (means intelligence) to Pari, Chanchal(means mischievous) to Prarthana, Dhairya (means patience) to Panjiri, Shakti (means strength) to Prema and Surili (means Sweet Voice) to Pratibha.

== Cast and characters ==
=== Main ===
- Maninder Singh as Mr. Kanhaiya Paanchal: Kuntidevi and Kailash's son; Kusum's brother; Pari, Prarthana, Panjiri, Prema and Pratibha's husband; Buddhi, Chanchal, Dhairya, Shakti and Surili's father. He is a 37-years-old, successful, saree shop owner in Meerut. He often has to sort out the problems faced by his family, mainly of his mother and wives. He doesn't believe in superstitious beliefs, unlike his mother and his four wives (excluding Pratibha).
- Kanchan Gupta as Kunti Devi Paanchal: Kailash's widow; Kanhaiya and Kusum's mother; Buddhi, Chanchal, Dhairya, Shakti and Surili's grandmother. She is a loving-yet-greedy and possessive mother who asks a boon from Lord Shiva, of a daughter-in-law who has all the five talents, i.e. she should be beautiful, saintly, culinarian, tender-hearted and intelligent. Instead, she gets five daughter-in-laws, each with one desired quality. She falls into traps of superstitious beliefs. She gets easily irritated by the antics of her bahus (mainly Pari), Kusum's habit of sleeping and Pratap's habit of asking her money.
- Ojaswi Aroraa as Pari Paanchal: Kanhaiya's first wife; Buddhi's mother. She is the prettiest of the five wives and likes to click selfies but she is tenth fail. She often doesn't understand the things told to her and does them in a comical way. She is called "Akal ki Mallika"( The girl with brains: which in a sense is to indicate that she has no brain but gives ideas like one) by Kunti.
- Astha Agarwal as Prarthana Paanchal: Panjiri's sister; Kanhaiya's second wife; Chanchal's mother. She is the most religious and talks in literal Hindi, which is not understood by anyone except for Panjiri. She strongly believes in superstitions just like Kunti Devi. She used to sleepwalk. She calls her sister "Bholi." She is called "Bholi ki didi"(Bholi's elder sister) or "Keh rahi didi ki didi" by Kunti.
- Radhika Muthukumar as Panjiri Paanchal: Prarthana's sister; Kanhaiya's third wife; Dhairya's mother. She cooks the most delicious food. She is the shadow of her elder sister and does everything her sister does and is also her translator. She is called "Keh rahi hai didi"(Elder sister is saying) by Kunti because she often says while translating her sisters word. She used to tell stories of her village.
- Reena Aggarwal / Patrali Chattopadhyay as Prema Paanchal: Kanhaiya's fourth wife; Shakti's mother. She speaks French fluently and is the most romantic of all. She ponders love stories, due to which she is often scolded by Kunti. Of the five wives, she talks the most sweetly and in French. She is called "Merath ki Menka"(The lovely lady of Meerut) by Kunti.
- Dharti Bhatt as Pratibha Sharma Paanchal: Ramkishan's daughter; Kanhaiya's fifth wife; Surilii's mother. She is the most intelligent of the five wives, and is practical as well. She takes care of budget of the house. She has a catchphrase, 'Soch Ke Dekho' (think and see like it). She is only wife of Kanhaiya who is not superstitious.
- Sejal Gupta as Buddhi Paanchal: Kanhaiya and Pari's daughter; Chanchal, Dhairya, Shakti and Surili's half-sister. She is the smartest of all the daughters.
- Ridhima Taneja as Chanchal Paanchal: Kanhaiya and Prarthana's daughter; Buddhi, Dhairya, Shakti and Surili's half-sister. She is the most mischievous of all the daughters.
- Aarna Bhadoriya as Dhairya Paanchal: Kanhaiya and Panjiri's daughter and Buddhi, Chanchal, Shakti and Surili's half-sister. She is calm and composed but slowpoke and makes her last in all physical sports and activities of all the daughters.
- Arista Mehta as Shakti Paanchal: Kanhaiya and Prema's daughter and Buddhi, Chanchal, Dhairya and Surili's half-sister. She is the strongest of all the daughters. She gets easily annoyed and is also short-tempered.
- Ayat Shaikh as Surili Paanchal: Kanhaiya and Pratibha's daughter; Buddhi, Chanchal, Dhairya and Shakti's half-sister. She has the most beautiful voice of all the daughters.
- Shruti Rawat as Padma / Bijli Rani: Kanhaiya's fake sixth wife who wanted to own Kunti Nivas for her boyfriend Raka.
- Runav Shah as Gopal: Padma and Kanhaiya's fake son. He was arranged by Padma and her boyfriend Raka to somehow take away the Kunti Niwas. His parents made him act in the drama for money.
- Rahul Singh as Pratap Kumar: Kusum's husband. He is a struggling actor who is staying with his mother-in-law; he is sarcastic and is the comical element of the show. He often asks Kunti to give him his pocket money or name her house for him. He teases Kusum for being irresponsible and for excessive sleeping. When Kunti has a problem to deal with in the house, he give her the weird idea to either leave the house or die. He dresses up in different characters according to his drama. It is shown that he used gamble in one of the episodes.
- Ariah Agarwal as Kusum: Kunti and Kailash's daughter; Kanhaiya's sister; Pratap's wife; Buddhi, Chanchal, Dhairya, Shakti, Surili's aunt. She is a lazy, sleepy girl who is obsessed with television shows. She always scolds her husband for being jobless and spends most of the time either sleeping or relishing on delicious food made by Panjiri. She is called "lady magarmachh (lady crocodile)' and 'Kumbhkaran( a character in Ramayan, who is known for sleeping for a long period of time)" by her husband and mother. She often talks about scenes in "Savdhaan India". She often tells Kunti that Kanhaiya has forgotten about her about the arrival of her bahus. In one episode, she provoked Kunti against her bahus.

=== Recurring ===
- Abhay Pratap Singh as Khatru, an employee at Kanhaiya's saree shop who constantly bothers Kanhaiya by asking him to grant him leave or give him extra money. He often appreciates his girlfriend Reshma, stating that her food (which is the worst) is very nice. Whenever he talks to Reshma, he forgets the things happening in the shop. He shows the sarees to the customer in a comical way
- Anahita Jahabaksh as Sarla, Kunti's neighbour who teases Kunti. She always ridicules Kunti for having five daughters-in-law, but at the same time, appreciates their talents. It shown that she is scared of her daughter-in-law. She is called "Football' by Kunti. She is a gossiper, who knows about the happenings in the colony.
- Kushal Punjabi as Lord Shiva; he fulfilled Kunti's wish but in a way to teach her that greed is wrong. He used to warn Kunti of greed, telling her that" Lalach burri bhala hai ( Greed is a wrong way to do things)"
- Abha Parmar as Balwanti: Kunti’s rival. She had challenged Kunti to make grand Durga Puja in Meerut. She along with her grandsons challenged Kunti and.her granddaughters in Wrestling competition to eventually getting defeated.
- Arya as Ram Prasad Chaurasiya, Kunti's brother. He is a lawyer, and also provides astrological advice. He has a habit of saying "Kanoon Ka Aadmi Hoon (I am a person of law)". In the special episode of "Monochwa", it is revealed that he had freed Meerut from the creatures clutches (in fact, he was buying oil, but the oil spilled and he was trying to blow it out, unaware that the deadly creature was there). He accepted this claim only to get money. Whenever he comes to Kunti's house, the only thing he does is eat the food made by Panjiri
- Chhaya Vora as Pari's mother. She used to Pari that she had no brain's.
- Gaurav More as Chirangi Lal, the TV news reporter, who often discusses incidents related to the Panchal family.
- Ravi Dubey as himself, to promote his show Sabse Smart Kaun. He helped in the mystery case of Munochwa.
- Indira Krishnan as Ghaziabad Wali Bua. Kanhaiya and Kusum's aunt. Kunti usually thinks of going to her house whenever something is not available for her in the Kunti Niwas.
- Alpana Buch as Guddo Bua aka Roorkee Wali Bua. Kanhaiya and Kusum's aunt. She came to see Kunti's bahus after a days of Kanhaiya's marriage. Kusum used to tell that she would through tantrums at anyone. Her husband is a heart patient and falls unconscious whenever he hears loud sound.
- Amit Pandey as Ballu Bhaiya, Prarthana and Panjiri's maternal brother.
- Rajesh Dubey as Mishraji
- Jayesh Barbhaya as Corporation Officer M. K. Duggal
- Rajendra Gupta as Tejpal Shastri, Pratibha's uncle, who dislike married life.

== Background and production ==
=== Filming ===
In April 2018, Reena Aggarwal who was portraying the character of Prema the fourth wife of Kanhaiya, was bitten on the face by the dog in the scene she was shooting. Doctors advised her to take a month's break for recuperation. Later, she left the series and was replaced by Patrali Chattopadhyay.

== Themes and analysis ==
The producer of the series Vipul D Shah stated that the series is not promoting polygamy, which is a criminal offence in India for all citizens except Muslims. He said that the show is about fantasy and fiction and they are not spreading a false message to audiences. He further said that:

Comedy comes naturally to us and we have been wanting to do something really different with the [mother-in-law - daughter-in-law] angle, and so this idea came up. We want to spread the message that sometimes when you want more, it doesn’t always turn out to be good.

== Awards and nominations ==
Year	Award	Category	Recipient	Result
2018	Gold Awards	Best Actor in Comic Role	Maninder Singh	Won
2018	Indian Television Academy Awards	Best Director - Sitcom Comedy	Kedar Shinde	Won
2018	Indian Television Academy Awards	Best Dialogue- Sitcom Comedy	Virat Basoia	Won
2018	Lions Gold Awards	Best Comic Actor (Fiction)	Maninder Singh	Won
2019	Indian Telly Awards	Best Actress in Comic Role	Kanchan Gupta	Nominated
2019	Indian Telly Awards	Best Actress in Comic Role	Dharti Bhatt	Nominated
2019	Indian Telly Awards	Best Actress in Comic Role	Ojwasi Oberoi	Nominated

== See also ==
- List of Hindi comedy shows
