= Bhaag Bakool Bhaag =

Hindi television sitcom

- Genre: Sitcom
- Created by: Sanjay Kohli
- Written by: Anukalp Goswami
- Country of origin: India
- Original language: Hindi
- No. of seasons: 1
- No. of episodes: 100

Production
- Producer: Sanjay Kohli
- Production locations: Mumbai, India
- Camera setup: Multi-camera
- Running time: 22 Minutes
- Production company: Edit II Productions

Original release
- Network: Colors TV
- Release: 15 May – 29 September 2017

Bhaag Bakool Bhaag (transl. Run Bakool Run) is an Indian Hindi-language sitcom. It starred Jay Soni as the titular character with Hiba Nawab and Shruti Rawat.

== Plot ==
The sitcom is about Bakool who lives two lives. One in a Rural area and other in an Urban area. What has got him in trouble is that he has two wives in his two lives. Soon, there is a leap of one month and it is shown that both Jigna and Sheena (Bakool's wives) are pregnant with his children. Kokila and Ranjeet are overjoyed. Eventually, everything is revealed in front of everyone and all the characters realize that Bakul was a victim of circumstances and not a fraudster. The show culminates with Bakool feeding both his wives, thereby helping them in completing the rituals of their respective fasts, and both the parties accepting Bakool.

== Cast ==
- Jay Soni as Bakool "Dholu" Vasavda
- Hiba Nawab as Sheena Vasavda
- Shruti Rawat as Jigna Vasavda
- Purvi Vyas as Kokilaben Vasavda
- Navin Bawa as Ranjeet
- Feroz as Ramlal / Dugdoo
- Hardik Sangani as Harish "Harry" Upadhyay
- Sohit Vijay Soni as Ghanta Panwala

=== Guest Appearances ===
- Hina Khan as Herself
- Nia Sharma as Herself
- Ravi Dubey as Himself
- Rakhi Sawant as Twinkle Maa

== Guests ==
- Hina Khan as herself, for the promotion of Khatron Ke Khiladi Season 8
- Nia Sharma as herself, for the promotion of Khatron Ke Khiladi Season 8
- Ravi Dubey as himself, for the promotion of Khatron Ke Khiladi Season 8
- Rakhi Sawant as Twinke Maa
