= Pyar Zindagi Hai =

- Genre: Comedy
- Directed by: Jitendra Kumar
- Starring: See below
- Country of origin: India
- Original language: Hindi
- No. of seasons: 1

Production
- Producer: Rajeev Tandon
- Camera setup: Multi-camera
- Running time: Approx. 24 minutes
- Production company: RT Films

Original release
- Network: Zee TV
- Release: 30 March 2003

Pyar Zindagi Hai is an Indian television comedy series that premiered on Zee TV on 30 March 2003. The series is set in the Punjabi backdrop, and stars Rakhee Tandon & Mukul Dev in the main lead.

Love, Life & Laughter are the three mantras of this delightful comedy series that will leave you with a smile on your face but with a tear in your eye. It’s about all the special moments of life shared with the people who matter the most. It shows that life is all about falling in love and making love your life. It also portrays that if you are in love you would have to face problems, but in those problems also you find happiness and keep your relation going. This serial is for all the viewers who are in love and even for those ready to fall in love.

== Cast ==
- Rakhee Tandon ... Simi (main female protagonist)
- Mukul Dev ... Sunny (Simi's husband)
- Bharat Kapoor
- Sadhana Singh
- Kanwarjit Paintal ... ?? (Simi's father-in-law)
- Sheela Sharma
