= Sandit Tiwari =

Indian television actor

- Born: Bhilai, Chhattisgarh, India
- Education: Master of Business Administration
- Occupation: Actor
- Years active: 2011–present

Sandit Tiwari is an Indian television actor. He played the role of Sahib in Me Aajji Aur Sahib and Sagar in Mahisagar.

Tiwari was born in Bhilai. He is an electrical engineer and has done Master of Business Administration from University Business School – Chandigarh.

Tiwari started his career the television show Beend Banoongaa Ghodi Chadhunga in 2011. After that he played the lead role in Me Aajji Aur Sahib and a cameo in Anamika He also played an episodic roles in Crime Patrol and Fear Files: Darr Ki Sacchi Tasvirein.

== Television ==
Year	Serial	Role	Channel
2012	Savdhaan India	Episode 9	Life OK

- Beend Banoongaa Ghodi Chadhunga as Rakesh (2011)
- Me Aajji Aur Sahib as Vishwaas Bapat (2012)
- Fear Files (2013)
- Anamika as Shekher (2013)
- Mahisagar as Sagar Mehta ( 2013–14)
- Jamai Raja as Prashant (2014)
- C.I.D. as Arvind (2015)
- Naya Mahisagar as Sagar Mehta (2016)
- Savdhaan India as Manas (2016)
