= Tu Hi Re Dil Mein =

Indian romantic drama television series

- Genre: Drama; Romance
- Based on: Mizhi Randilum
- Written by: Dialogues: Rajesh Chawla
- Directed by: Rohit Raj Goyal; Ankur Bhatia
- Creative director: Siddhartha Vankar
- Starring: Priyanshi Yadav; Abrar Qazi; Simran Rawal
- Opening theme: "Tu Hi Re Dil Mein" by Chetan Bharanga; Lyrics: Sandeep Sharare
- Composer: Ankit-Chetan
- Country of origin: India
- Original language: Hindi
- No. of episodes: 142

Production
- Producer: Aman Sachdeva
- Camera setup: Multi-camera
- Running time: 20 minutes
- Production companies: Films and Shots Production

Original release
- Network: Zee TV
- Release: 15 June 2026 – present

Tu Hi Re Dil Mein (transl. You Are In My Heart) is an Indian Hindi-language family drama television series which premiered on Zee TV on 15 June 2026 and streams digitally on ZEE5. Produced by Films and Shots Production, the series stars Priyanshi Yadav, Abrar Qazi and Simran Rawal. It is an official remake of Zee Keralam's Malayalam series Mizhi Randilum.

== Premise ==
Believed to bring luck, Vrinda marries her dream man, Sanjay, who loves Swati. Living in his home as a caretaker, Vrinda faces silent sacrifices and soul ties, uncertain if fate will ever choose her.

== Cast ==
=== Main ===
- Priyanshi Yadav as Vrinda Dave Patel: Dhankor's daughter; Vipul and Atul's sister; Sanjay's wife (2026–present)
- Abrar Qazi as Sanjay Patel: Sarita's son; Sanjog's best friend; Swati's fiance; Vrinda's husband (2026–present)
- Simran Rawal as Dr. Swati Shah: Madhavi and Mohan's daughter; Sanjay's fiance (2026–present)

=== Recurring ===
- Kanwarjit Paintal as Mr. Patel: Kesar's husband; Kavita and Rupal's father; Sanjay's grandfather (2026–present)
- Beena Banerjee as Kesar Patel: Mr. Patel's wife; Kavita and Rupal's mother; Sanjay's grandmother (2026–present)
- Deepali Pansare as Kavita Patel Virani: Kesar and Mr. Patel's daughter; Rupal's sister; Gautam's secret wife (2026–present)
- Vijay Badlaani as Gautam Virani: Kavita's secret husband (2026–present)
- Dolphin Dubey as Rupal Patel: Kesar and Mr. Patel's daughter; Kavita's sister; Nirav's wife (2026–present)
- Mithil Jain as Nirav: Rupal's abusive husband (2026–present)
- Pyumori Mehta Ghosh as Sarita Patel: Sanjay's mother (2026–present)
- Gouri Tonk as Madhavi Shah: Mohan's wife; Swati's mother (2026–present)
- Akshay Verma as Mohan Shah: Madhavi's husband; Swati's father (2026–present)
- Amardeep Jha as Baa: Vrinda, Vipul and Atul's grandmother (2026–present)
- Pallavi Pradhan as Dhankor Dave: Vrinda, Vipul and Atul's mother (2026–present)
- Jitendra Bohara as Vipul Dave: Dhankor's elder son; Vrinda and Atul's brother; Premlata's husband (2026–present)
- Unknown as Premlata Dave: Vipul's wife (2026–present)
- Rajeev Singh as Atul Dave: Dhankor's younger son; Vrinda and Vipul's brother (2026–present)
- Anubhav Dixit as Narendra: Vrinda's obsessive lover (2026–present)
- Anuraj Chahal as Sanjog: Sanjay's best friend (2026–present)
- Kavita Vaid as Krishnaben: A tea stall owner (2026)
- Jivansh Gupta as Nandu (2026–present)
- Rakesh Machkure
- Drashti Jaiswal
- Anuj Khurana
- Saatvik Sharma
- Aadvik Misal

== Production ==
=== Casting ===
Abrar Qazi was confirmed to play the male lead, Sanjay. Priyanshi Yadav was selected to portray Vrindha. Simran Rawal was cast to play Swati, making her television debut as a lead actor. In September 2026, Anuraj Chahal entered the show as Sanjog.

=== Premiere ===
The show was put on hold for some time from March dut to the lukewarm response from the audience for the first teaser and title dispute with Ekta Kapoor. Makers spend time in developing the love triangle and Sanjay's dilemma tracks. After the delay, the show premiered on 15 June 2026, replacing Saru.

=== Ratings ===
The show opened with a low BARC TRP of 0.7 in week 24 of 2026.

== Controversy ==
=== Title dispute ===
When Zee TV announced the title as "Pavitra Rishta" in December 2025, the creator of the 2009 iconic TV series by the same name, Ekta Kapoor slammed the makers for using the same title. She shared a sharp, critical note on her Instagram stating:

“When you can't create an IP, u feed on an established one of another creator! Terrible ethics of intellectual bankruptcy!! or both!! Nothing Pavitra about it!!!”

— Ekta Kapoor

After the intense backlash from fans and producer Ekta, the channel changed the title to "Tu Hi Re Dil Mein" in April 2026.

=== Director opted out ===
In June 2026, director Ameet Guptha went public with social media evidence. He shared screenshots proving his name had been entirely chopped from the first episode’s on-screen credits despite he dedicated six months to pre-production and filming the initial episodes. Broadcaster ZEE Network officially withdrew its internal "rotational credit" policy in July after intense pressure from the Screenwriters Association.

== Adaptations ==
Language	Title	Original release	Network	Last aired	Notes
Malayalam	Mizhi Randilum മിഴി രണ്ടിലും	2 January 2023	Zee Keralam	11 August 2024	Original
Hindi	Tu Hi Re Dil Mein तू ही रे दिल में	15 June 2026	Zee TV	Ongoing	Remake

== Awards and nominations ==
Year	Award	Category	Recipient	Result	Ref.
2026	Indian Television Academy Awards	Best Actress - Drama - TV	Priyanshi Yadav	Pending	
2026	Indian Television Academy Awards	Best Supporting Actress - Drama - TV	Amardeep Jha	Pending	
2026	Indian Television Academy Awards	Best Negative Performance - TV	Pallavi Pradhan	Pending	
2026	Indian Television Academy Awards	Best Director - Drama - TV	Uncle Bhatia	Pending	
