= Woh Toh Hai Albelaa =

Indian television series

- Genre: Drama; Romance
- Created by: Rajan Shahi
- Based on: Eeramana Rojave
- Developed by: Zama Habib
- Written by: Dialogues: Munisha Rajpal
- Screenplay by: Bhavna Vyas
- Story by: Namita Vartak
- Starring: Shaheer Sheikh; Hiba Nawab
- Music by: Nakash Aziz; Sargam Jassu
- Opening theme: Woh To Hai Albelaa
- Country of origin: India
- Original language: Hindi
- No. of episodes: 361

Production
- Producer: Rajan Shahi
- Editor: Sameer Gandhi
- Running time: 20–24 minutes
- Production company: Director's Kut Productions

Original release
- Network: Star Bharat
- Release: 14 March 2022 – 14 June 2023

Related
- Eeramana Rojave

Woh To Hai Albelaa (transl. He Is Indeed Very Unique) was an Indian Hindi-language television drama series that aired from 14 March 2022 to 14 June 2023 on Star Bharat and is digitally available on Disney+ Hotstar. Produced by Rajan Shahi under Director Kut's Productions, it starred Shaheer Sheikh and Hiba Nawab in the lead roles, with Anuj Sachdeva playing a major cameo role. It is an official adaptation of Star Vijay's Tamil series Eeramana Rojave.

== Plot ==
Balwant Sharma and Dhanraj Choudhary are neighbors and best friends like their wives, Indrani and Saroj. But, due to a fight between their children Krishna and Sayuri, Saroj becomes enemies with the Sharma family. Saroj thinks Balwant used Dhanraj only for his business. Balwant denies so and asks what Saroj wants. She demands half of his business, due to, which Indrani and Saroj get, into a confrontation. Indrani slaps and insults Saroj. Balwant later dies, due to his deteriorating health.

=== 18 years later ===
Time passes by, Saroj still holds a grudge against Indrani and her family for the insult. Indrani and Balwant’s eldest daughter, Sayuri, is a professor. Whereas Krishna (Kanha) is a blogger. Sayuri hates Kanha because she holds him responsible for their families feuding. Saroj and Dhanraj’s eldest son and Kanha’s older brother, Chiranjeev (Chiru) is in love with Sayuri and the two want to get married. They succeed in convincing their families, especially Saroj, and receive their blessings. The wedding preparations begin on a good note, but unfortunately, Chiru meets with an accident and dies on the wedding day. Saroj wrongfully blames both Sayuri and Kanha for Chiru's death. Furthermore, Kanha marries Sayuri in order to fulfill the promise that he made to Chiru, which was to always take care of Sayuri.

Both Kanha and Sayuri are unable to accept each other, and neither does Saroj want to accept Sayuri as her daughter-in-law. Kanha's former lover, Anjali Malhotra, tries to create problems between Kanha and Sayuri because of her obsession. Manipulated by the latter, Saroj agrees to help her. In the meantime, Kanha and Sayuri become friends and grow closer. They gradually fall in love but Sayuri refuses to accept her feelings and leaves for her home. Anjali begins to do things her way and ends up gravely injuring Saroj. Despite the treatment she receives from Saroj, Sayuri donates her blood to save her life, but instead of being grateful, Saroj is rather repulsed by having Sayuri’s blood in her, to which Kanha reprimands her. Anjali is exposed for harming Saroj and leaves for good. Sayuri returns and consummates her marriage with Kanha.

Saroj, still refusing to accept Sayuri, has a change of heart when Sayuri reveals her pregnancy, to which she rejoices. Kanha's younger brother, Nakul, and Sayuri's younger sister, Rashmi confess their love for each other and wish to get married. Saroj accepts their relationship, after which Nakul and Rashmi get engaged. With Sayuri’s position in the household and pregnancy, Rashmi starts feeling insecure and grows jealous of the latter. As shown to the fourth wall, Rashmi’s insecurities and jealousy result in her being frustrated at how situations favour Sayuri, yet put her in a bad light. This causes Rashmi to not only have outbursts, but she grows to hate both Sayuri and Kanha, thus beginning her plotting phase.

Saroj accepts a marriage proposal for her step-daughter and Dhanraj’s eldest child, Kusum, from Rishi Kumar, who is a cunning person. Before they even get married, Rishi begins to torture Kusum and blackmails her every time she tries to tell the truth. After their wedding, Sayuri, Kanha, and Nakul notice Kusum's changed behaviour. After Sayuri and Kanha find out the truth, they send Rishi to jail and begin the divorce proceedings. Rishi escapes from jail, kidnaps Kusum and tries to kill her as revenge for being beaten up by Nakul and Kahna and being sent to jail. Sayuri holds herself responsible as she had sent Kusum out on a date with her friend, Yash Jindal, but in the wrong car, and rushes to save her. While fighting Rishi, she falls to the ground after being pushed by him, which leads to her miscarriage. Kanha kills Rishi in self-defence and the latter’s parents file a complaint against Kanha, but the case is dismissed because of the pending charges against Rishi, thus declaring Kanha innocent and Rishi’s death is ruled as an accident.

Later, Yash and Kusum, along with Nakul and Rashmi, get married. Rashmi reveals to Sayuri that she can't bear a baby and informs her about Kanha’s knowledge on the matter in order to create problems between them. Unfortunately, this completely backfires as Sayuri realises what Rashmi's intentions were and her previous schemes and exposes her in front of both families. As Nakul is about to end their marriage, Kanha and Sayuri convince him to forgive her and give his relationship one last chance, to which he reluctantly does, and Rashmi is let off with a warning.

Just when it seems Rashmi is realising her misdeeds, she continues to put the blame on Kanha and Sayuri for all of the problems in her life. This results in Rashmi plotting to get rid of Sayuri. When Kanha, Sayuri, Nakul, Rashmi, Kusum, and Yash go on a trip to their family deity worship, Rashmi attempts to push Sayuri off a cliff, but before she does, Sayuri turns around to find Rashmi behind her and loses her balance. Rashmi hesitantly reaches out her hand to help Sayuri but before the latter holds on to her hand, she retracts it and Sayuri eventually slips and falls to her apparent death.

=== 1 year later ===
A year later, Rashmi is seen having several nightmares and hallucinations, due to the incident. She has also given birth to her and Nakul's son, Arjun, who is under Indrani's care, as she has moved in with the Choudhary’s. Meanwhile Kanha, who has not accepted Sayuri's death, pines for her return. His relationship with Nakul has also suffered in the process, due to Rashmi’s plotting.

Kanha meets with an accident, after which Dr. Vikrant Desai saves him. He sees Vikrant's wife Sanchi, who is Sayuri's look-alike with their mute daughter, Komal (Kuku). He assumes Sanchi to be Sayuri and is delighted. When Kanha tries to take her home, Sanchi denies being Sayuri. Kanha does not believe her and tells only Yash because he knows that everyone else will not believe him. It is then revealed that Sanchi is in fact Sayuri, but is unable to tell Kanha the truth because her and Kahna's daughter is being held captive by Vikrant. In a flashback, it is revealed how Sayuri was found by Vikrant after her accident and ended up in his house. A pregnant Sayuri slips in and out of a coma and notices that each time she wakes up, Vikrant calls her Sanchi. When she permanently wakes up from her coma, she finds out that she is no longer pregnant. Vikrant reveals to her that she gave birth and her daughter is in his captivity. He blackmails Sayuri into staying with him using her child, and after many failed attempts of meeting Kanha, Sayuri reluctantly agrees.

In the present, Rashmi begins following Kanha and Yash and continuously eavesdrops on their conversations, and finds out that Sayuri is alive, much to her horror. Kanha meets his and Sayuri's daughter with Yash's help and feels a strong connection with her, which leads to him putting the puzzle pieces together. Meanwhile Sayuri finds the real Sanchi’s dead body in the storeroom and realises Vikrant killed her. Having pretended to fall in love with him and wanting to get married for real, Sayuri begins plotting against Vikrant by acting sweet so that he can trust her. Eventually, Sayuri finally seeks Kanha’s help and tells him the truth. Rashmi, who has been watching Sayuri and Vikrant’s wedding, hoping Kanha does not arrive in time, sees the latter. She becomes afraid of the fact that he will succeed in saving Sayuri and their daughter, so she thwarts their plan by making Vikrant realise Sayuri was fooling him by appearing in front of them and tells Sayuri that Kanha is bringing help. In a fit of rage, Vikrant attacks Sayuri and runs off with her, and Rashmi with Mittu, planning on disposing of her, but she runs into Indrani and Nakul. During a car chase, Vikrant’s car crashes with him and Sayuri inside. Just before the car explodes, Kanha saves Sayuri, and Vikrant dies in the explosion.

Sayuri returns home, and everyone rejoices, except Saroj, who believes Mittu is Vikrant’s daughter, and is unhappy with Kuku's adoption. Sayuri suffering from PTSD begins seeing Vikrant. Kanha suspects that someone is intentionally trying to scare Sayuri. On the day of Holi, with Nakul’s help, Kanha catches Ravi, a mask seller, who was paid to scare Sayuri. When questioned, he paints Rashmi as the mastermind, which is false, but Sayuri believes him and exposes the latter for her deeds and is sent to jail. Heartbroken Nakul break ties with her.

Sayuri and Kanha go out for a business meeting, in a village and meet a strange girl, Chaman Bahar, in the jungle and bring her home, not realising that it was her plan to enter their home in the first place. Kuku has started speaking. Sayuri and Kanha's daughter is named Kiara. That same day, Saroj is revealed to have secretly done a DNA test on Kahna and Kiara when the results arrive. Kahna gives Saroj an ultimatum, she either reads the reports and lose Kahna forever, or she accepts Kiara without seeing what is written on them. Trying to win the family's trust, Chaman burns the results. Later, Sayuri secretly gets a copy of the reports and gives them to Saroj, without telling Kahna.

Having been given work as a servant, Chaman soon seizes the house. The Chaudhary’s are later forced to leave their home and move in with the Sharma’s. Kanha meets with an accident and is gravely injured, but is unable to receive treatment due to the family not having any money, and to save him, Sayuri has to strike a deal with Chaman. Chaman asks Sayuri to sign divorce papers to save Kahna’s life, and with no way out, Sayuri signs them. Kanha receives treatment and returns home. Upon his return, he and the family begin strategizing against Chaman. They take help from Ammu, a prostitute, whom Nakul confides in and considers a friend. The family succeeds in getting Chaman arrested, along with Tingu, her best friend and one sided lover. Rashmi's involvement is also revealed by Sayuri and goes back to jail. Having fallen in love, Nakul and Ammu seek blessings from Saroj, who is repulsed by Ammu’s profession, but after much consideration, she happily gives in and goes as far as accepting Ammu as her daughter.

The Chaudhary family is seen to be preparing for Nakul and Ammu’s wedding, which is a successful small celebration. Kahna and Sayuri show appreciation towards each other for always sticking together. With this, Kahna lifts Sayuri in his arms and spins her around, and the show ends on a good note.

== Cast ==
=== Main ===
- Hiba Nawab as Sayuri "Sayu" Sharma Choudhary: Indrani and Balwant's eldest daughter; Rashmi and Priya's sister; Chiranjeev's fiancée; Krishna's wife; Kiara's mother; Komal's adoptive mother (2022–2023)
- Shaheer Sheikh as Krishna "Kanha" Choudhary: Saroj and Dhanraj's second son; Chiranjeev and Nakul's brother; Kusum's half-brother; Anjali's ex-boyfriend; Sayuri's husband; Kiara's father; Komal's adoptive father (2022–2023)
- Anuj Sachdeva as Chiranjeev "Chiru" Choudhary: Saroj and Dhanraj's eldest son; Krishna and Nakul's brother; Kusum's half-brother; Sayuri's late fiancé (2022)

=== Recurring ===
- Kinshuk Vaidya as Nakul Choudhary: Saroj and Dhanraj's youngest son; Chiranjeev and Krishna's brother; Kusum's half-brother; Rashmi's ex-husband; Ammu's husband; Arjun's father (2022–2023)
- Rachi Sharma/Dharti Bhatt as Rashmi "Rashu" Sharma: Indrani and Balwant's second daughter; Sayuri and Priya's sister; Nakul's ex-wife; Arjun's mother; Komal and Kiara's aunt (2022)/ (2022–2023)
- Sucheta Khanna as Indrani Sharma: Balwant's widow; Sayuri, Rashmi and Priya's mother; Komal, Kiara and Arjun's grandmother (2022–2023)
- Pallavi Pradhan as Saroj Choudhary: Dhanraj's second wife; Chiranjeev, Krishna and Nakul's mother; Kusum's step-mother; Komal, Kiara and Arjun's grandmother (2022–2023)
- Suruchi Adarkar as Kusum Choudhary Jindal (formerly Kumar): Sakshi and Dhanraj's daughter; Saroj's step-daughter; Chiranjeev, Krishna and Nakul's half-sister; Rishi's ex-wife; Yash's wife (2022–2023)
- Khushwant Walia as Yash Jindal: Sayuri's best friend; Krishna's business partner; Kusum's second husband (2022–2023)
- Mehul Buch as Dhanraj Choudhary: Tejendra's son; Sakshi's widower; Saroj's husband; Kusum, Chiranjeev, Krishna and Nakul's father; Komal, Kiara and Arjun's grandfather (2022–2023)
- Nayan Bhatt as Bhanumati Sharma: Balwant's mother; Sayuri, Rashmi and Priya's grandmother; Komal, Kiara and Arjun's great-grandmother (2022–2023)
- Somesh Agarwal as Tejendra Choudhary: Dhanraj's father; Kusum, Chiranjeev, Krishna and Nakul's grandfather; Komal, Kiara and Arjun's great-grandfather (2022–2023)
- Hazel Shah as Komal "Kuku" Choudhary (née Desai): Vikrant and Sanchi's daughter; Krishna and Sayuri's adopted daughter; Kiara's adopted sister (2022–2023)
- Prerna Mehta as Kiara "Mithu" Choudhary: Krishna and Sayuri's daughter; Komal's adoptive sister (2023)
- Deven Jain as Arjun Chaudhary: Nakul and Rashmi's son; Ammu's step-son (2023)
- Priyamvada Kant as Chamanbahar: Choudhary's househelp; Tingu's best friend and love interest; Sayuri's rival (2023)
- Sujata Vaishnav as Archana Choudhary: Saroj and Indrani's aunt-in-law; Chiranjeev, Krishna and Nakul's great-aunt; Komal, Arjun and Kiara's great great aunt (2022–2023)
- Lakshmi Mehta as Sanchi: Vikrant's wife
- Karan Veer Mehra as Dr. Vikrant Desai: Sanchi's husband and murderer; Komal's father; Sayuri's fake husband (2022–2023)
- Vaishnavi Ganatra as Priya "Pia" Sharma: Indrani and Balwant's youngest daughter; Sayuri and Rashmi's sister (2022)
- Sachin Tyagi as Balwant Sharma: Bhanumati's son; Indrani's late husband; Sayuri, Rashmi and Priya's father; Komal, Kiara and Arjun's grandfather (2022)
- Aparna Dixit as Anjali Malhotra: Roma and Amitabh's daughter; Krishna's ex-girlfriend turned obsessive lover (2022)
- Manish Chawla as Rishi Kumar: Kusum's abusive ex-husband (2022)
- Arup Pal as Amitabh Malhotra: Roma's husband; Anjali's father (2022)
- Sanjana Phadke as Roma Malhotra: Amitabh's wife; Anjali's mother (2022)
- Monu Khanojiya as Tingu: Chamanbahar's friend (2023)
- Sushmita Singh as Ammu Choudhary: Nakul's second wife; Arjun's stepmother (2023)
- Sapan Chaudhary as Ranjeet: A film director; Ammu's friend (2023)
- Abhinav Chakshu Kashyap as Rahul: Anjali's friend (2022)
- Krishnakant Singh Bundela as Panditji (2022)

== Production ==
=== Development ===
The series is produced by Rajan Shahi under the Director Kut's Productions. Woh Toh Hai Albelaa officially started with a puja on the sets.

For a song sequence, Kanha, portrayed by Sheikh recreated Johnny Depp's Captain Jack Sparrow from Pirates of the Caribbean.

=== Casting ===
Shaheer Sheikh was cast to portray the lead, Krishna. It marks his second collaboration with Rajan Shahi post Yeh Rishtey Hain Pyaar Ke. He said, "I am very happy to work with Rajan Shahi sir once again. Krishna's character is very cool, allowing me to explore Shaheer Sheikh in reel life too and add my own interpretations to the character." Hiba Nawab was cast as Sayuri, opposite Sheikh. It is her second collaboration with Rajan Shahi after Tere Sheher Mein.

Kinshuk Vaidya and Rachi Sharma were cast as Krishna's brother Nakul and Sayuri's sister Rashmi respectively. It marks Sharma's acting debut. Anuj Sachdeva was cast as the eldest brother, Chiru. His role ended in May 2022. Suruchi Adarkar was cast as the eldest sister Kusum, marking her Hindi TV debut.

In December 2022, Dharti Bhatt replaced Rachi Sharma as Rashmi Sharma Choudhary, who left the show as she did not wanted to play a mother onscreen.

=== Filming ===
The series is set in Agra, Uttar Pradesh. It is mainly shot at the Film City, Mumbai. Some initial sequences, including a song were shot at Ramoji Film City in Hyderabad.

=== Release ===
The series promos were released in February 2022. Woh Toh Hai Albelaa premiered on 14 March 2022 on Star Bharat.
