= Hurdang =

- Theatrical release poster
- Directed by: Nikhil Nagesh Bhat
- Written by: Story and Screenplay: Nikhil Nagesh Bhat; Dialogues: Kuldeep Ruhil; Nikhil Nagesh Bhat
- Produced by: Shailesh R Singh; Bhushan Kumar
- Starring: Sunny Kaushal; Nushrratt Bharuccha; Vijay Varma
- Cinematography: Ramanuj Dutta; Archit Patel
- Edited by: Bodhaditya Banerjee
- Music by: Songs: Amaal Mallik; R. D. Burman; Sachet–Parampara; Background score: Ishaan Chhabra
- Production companies: Karma Media and Entertainment; T-Series
- Distributed by: AA Films
- Release date: 8 April 2022
- Running time: 122 minutes
- Country: India
- Language: Hindi

Hurdang is a 2022 Indian Hindi-language romantic drama film written and directed by Nikhil Nagesh Bhat. The film stars Sunny Kaushal, Nushrratt Bharuccha, and Vijay Varma. It was released theatrically on 8 April 2022.

Set against the backdrop of the Mandal Commission protests of 1990 in Allahabad, the film explores a turbulent love story entwined with student politics and social unrest.

Principal photography began on 6 July 2019.

== Plot ==
Set in the 1990s, Hurdang follows an aspiring IAS officer named Daddu, who becomes entangled in the student protests against the implementation of the Mandal Commission’s recommendations for caste-based reservations in government jobs and educational institutions.

Daddu is deeply in love with Jhulan, a determined and ambitious woman who shares his goal of becoming an IAS officer. Their relationship is turbulent, marked by frequent breakups and reconciliations. While Jhulan is focused and disciplined in her studies, Daddu is more impulsive and less committed. He plans to cheat in the civil service examinations, believing that a passing score will enable him to win Jhulan’s hand in marriage.

To achieve this, Daddu collaborates with Loha Bhaiya, a local strongman with political ambitions. Loha helps him leak examination papers in exchange for a share of the profits made by selling them to students.

Amidst this, the government led by V. P. Singh announces the implementation of the Mandal Commission's recommendations, triggering massive student protests across the country. Loha sees an opportunity to exploit the unrest for political gain and encourages Daddu to take a leading role in organizing and escalating the protests on his university campus.

As the political and social tensions escalate, Jhulan distances herself from Daddu due to his misguided priorities and agrees to an arranged marriage with a naive IAS officer. On the day the protests reach their peak and Daddu is arrested, Jhulan is preparing for her wedding.

After learning about the marriage, Daddu escapes police custody by disguising himself as a policeman. He discovers that Jhulan has drugged her husband with sleeping pills and fled. The two reunite and seek refuge at Loha’s house. Before they can escape, Loha convinces Daddu to make one final appearance at the protest to rally the students.

However, Loha has secretly plotted to kill Daddu by setting him on fire during the protest. Daddu’s best friend uncovers the plan and sacrifices himself to save Daddu. Realising Loha’s betrayal, Daddu kills both Loha and his brother.

The film concludes with Daddu and Jhulan heading to meet the President of India, carrying a petition to halt the implementation of the Mandal Commission recommendations.

== Cast ==
- Sunny Kaushal as Daddu Thakur
- Alok Pandey as Gopal Singh
- Nushrratt Bharuccha as Jhulan Yadav
- Vijay Varma as Loha Singh
- Shubhashish Jha as Ranjan

== Soundtrack ==
Hurdang

Soundtrack album by Amaal Mallik and Sachet–Parampara
- Released: 16 April 2022
- Recorded: 2019–2020
- Genre: Film soundtrack
- Length: 15:15
- Language: Hindi
- Label: T-Series
- Producer: Bhushan Kumar

Official audio
- Hurdang – Full Album on YouTube

The soundtrack of the film Hurdang was composed by Amaal Mallik and Sachet–Parampara, with lyrics written by Rashmi Virag and Irshad Kamil.

== Track listing ==
Track listing
No.	Title	Lyrics	Music	Singer(s)	Length
1.	"Kya Yehi Pyaar Hai"	Rashmi Virag	R. D. Burman (original), Amaal Mallik (recreated)	Armaan Malik	5:35
2.	"Khwaab Khwaab"	Irshad Kamil	Sachet–Parampara	Sachet Tandon	3:24
3.	"Halla Sheri"	Irshad Kamil	Sachet–Parampara	Sachet Tandon	3:26
4.	"Padhai Likhai"	Irshad Kamil	Sachet–Parampara	Parampara Tandon	2:00
Total length:					15:15
