= Pallavi Pradhan =

Indian television and film actress

- Born: Mumbai, Maharashtra, India
- Occupation: Actress
- Years active: 1995–present
- Relatives: Pranoti Pradhan (sister)

Pallavi Pradhan is an Indian television and film actress. She has done several TV shows and is known for her roles in Bahu Hamari Rajni Kant and Jiji Maa.

== Career ==
Pradhan started working as a Gujarati theater artist in 1995 and appeared in plays such as Arechya Sutala Ki Rao, Baa Na Gher Babo Aavyo, Kaanch Na Sambandh, Haarkh Padudi Hansa, and Jantar Mantar. She worked in different languages including Gujarati, Marathi and Hindi.

On television, Pradhan was first seen in the show Ek Mahal Ho Sapno Ka as Rashmi Nanavati. She also had a small role in Sarabhai vs Sarabhai. She played a comic role on the SAB TV show Sajan Re Jhooth Mat Bolo.

Pradhan appeared in the recent show Bahu Hamari Rajni Kant as Surili Kant and was most recently seen in Jiji Maa on Star Bharat.

== Filmography ==
=== Television ===
| Year | Title | Role | Notes | Ref. |
|---|---|---|---|---|
| 1999 | Ek Mahal Ho Sapno Ka | Rashmi Nanavati | | |
| 2005 | Sarabhai vs Sarabhai | Babu | | |
| 2009 | Sajan Re Jhoot Mat Bolo | Usha Dhirubhai Jhaveri | | |
| 2014 | lLagori-Maitri Returns | Malati | Marathi show | |
| 2016–2017 | Bahu Hamari Rajni Kant | Surili Chattopadhyay Kant | | |
| 2017–2019 | Jiji Maa | Uttara Choksi Rawat | | |
| 2020 | Bhakharwadi | Rasila Malviya | | |
| 2020 | Maddam Sir | Savitri Devi Singh | Guest appearance | |
| 2022–2023 | Woh Toh Hai Albelaa | Saroj Chaudhary | | |
| 2024–2025 | Ghum Hai Kisikey Pyaar Meiin | Bhagyashree Thakkar | | |
| 2026–present | Tu Hi Re Dil Mein | Dhankor | | |

=== Film ===
| Year | Film | Role | Language |
|---|---|---|---|
| 2005 | Baa Na Gher Babo Aavyo | | Gujarati |
| 2005 | Harakh Padudi Hansa | | Gujarati |
| 2005 | Kaanch Na Sambandh | | Gujarati |
| 2005 | Jantar Mantar | | Gujarati |

=== Web series ===
| Year | Title | Role | Notes |
|---|---|---|---|
| 2022 | Anupama: Namaste America | Mrs. Dhamecha | |

== Awards and nominations ==
| Year | Awards/Nominations | Category | Show/Film | Result |
|---|---|---|---|---|
| | ITA Awards | ITA Award for Best Actor – Female | | Nominated |
| 2018 | Gold Awards | Best Actor in Negative – Female | Jiji Maa | Won |
