= Aji Sunte Ho =

- Inter-title of Aji Sunte Ho
- Genre: Reality television
- Created by: Shashi Mittal; Sumeet Hukamchand Mittal
- Written by: Shashi Mittal; Sumeet Hukamchand Mittal
- Country of origin: India
- Original language: Hindi
- No. of seasons: 01
- No. of episodes: 70

Production
- Producers: Shashi Mittal; Sumeet Hukamchand Mittal
- Production locations: Mumbai, India
- Camera setup: Multi-camera
- Production company: Shashi Sumeet Productions

Original release
- Network: Zee TV
- Release: 14 November 2016 – 24 February 2017

Aji Sunte Ho is an Indian Hindi reality television series, which premiered on 14 November 2016 and was broadcast on Zee TV. The series was produced by Shashi Sumeet Productions of Shashi Mittal and Sumeet Hukamchand Mittal. The series was aired on weekdays' nights.

== Plot ==
The show welcomes couples from across the country over a session of fun and games, testing their compatibility.

== Host ==
- Pranoti Pradhan
- Satish Sharma
