= Mahisagar =

- Genre: Drama
- Written by: Deepak Malik; Swapnil Mahaling
- Country of origin: India
- Original language: Hindi
- No. of seasons: 1
- No. of episodes: 400 (season 1); 119 (season 2)

Production
- Producer: J.D. Majethia
- Production location: Ahmedabad
- Camera setup: Multi-camera
- Running time: Approx. 23 minutes
- Production company: Hats Off Productions

Original release
- Network: BIG Magic
- Release: 7 October 2013 – 15 April 2015

Mahisagar is an Indian drama television series which premiered on 7 October 2013 on BIG Magic and ended on 15 April 2015 with 400 episodes. The series is produced by J.D. Majethia of Hats Off Productions. It stars Anuj Thakur and Dharti Bhatt. It started re-airing on Big Magic from 24 February 2023 at 2pm.

== Seasons ==
Season	Episodes	Originally Broadcast		Timeslot
Season	Episodes	First aired	Last aired	Timeslot
1	400	7 October 2013	15 April 2015	7.30 pm
2	119	22 February 2016	8 August 2016	7.30 pm

== Theme ==
MahiSagar is a rib-tickling show which revolves around the life of a sweet, carefree small-town girl who is pitted against her politically distinguished mother-in-law.

== Plot ==
Mahi (Dharti Bhatt) simple care-free and academically weak girl, who lived in Verakhadi a small village in Gujarat, marries an Ahmedabad handsome and intelligent Sagar Mehta(Sandit Tiwari later Anuj Thakur) under circumstances and falls in love with him. Post marriage, they move to Sagar's home in Ahmedabad. At his home, lives his brother Rohit Mehta an abroad studied and settled and his wife Soniya Mehta who aspires to a Bollywood actress who is not good at using brains but is modern and up-to-date. Ansuya Mehta(Anahita Jahabaksh later Vandana Pathak) a loyal, praiseworthy and modern politician and Sagar's and Rohit's mother. Ansuya didn't accept Mahi at first but later accepted her but wants her to leave her old fashioned culture and become a modern daughter in law. Also Ansuya' husband Rajiv, her sister Bindu and the family chef Kanhaiyalal also give this story a perfect balance.
Each episode is different and portrays different comic situations of life and few social and political aspects also with some of their own fantasies and moreover challenge's between Mahi and Ansuya and how Sagar is getting through his life in the midst.

== Cast ==
=== Main ===
- Dharti Bhatt as Mahi Sagar Mehta (2013-2015)
- Anahita Jahanbaksh as Anusuya Rajiv Mehta(2013-2014)
- Vandana Pathak replaced Jahanbaksh.(2014-2015)
- Sandit Tiwari as Sagar Rajiv Mehta.(2013-2014)
- Anuj Thakur replaced Tiwari.(2014-2015)

=== Recurring ===
- Milind Joshi as Rajiv Mehta. (2014)
- Ankur Malhotra as Rohit Rajiv Mehta (2013,2014,2015)
- Namrata Dhameja as Soniya Rohit Mehta (2013-2015)
- Amish Tanna as Kanhaiya lal, Mehta's house help.(2014-2015)
- Muskaan Sayed as Bindu, Anusuya's younger unmarried sister(2014)
- Paresh Bhatt as Mayank Bindu's boyfriend turned Husband.(2014)
- Bharat Thakkar as Bapuji, Mahi and Hemu's father, a pujari. (2013, 2014)
- Pravin Asthana as Pravin Bhai, Mehta family's cook before Kanhaiyalal. (2013)
- Jay Sondagar as Sagar's friend.

=== Cameo ===
- Anang Desai as Mr. Anang Desai, Anusuya's friend's husband (episode 46 & 47)
- Rajashri Nikam as Kaushalya Desai, Anusuya's friend.(episode 46 & 47)
- Vandana Pathak as herself, Anusuya's friend (episode 46 & 47)
- Vinayak Ketkar as various characters.
- Jayshree Mehta as Fake Guru Mata (Episode 62)
- Bhairavi Vaidya as Danger Dadi
- Deepak Pareek as Anusuya's college professor

== Episodes ==
Episode 1 - 100

No.	Title	Original release date
1	"Meet the graceful Mahi"	7 October 2013
2	"Sagar lands in Verakhadi"	8 October 2013
3	"A Holi to be remembered"	9 October 2013
4	"Sagar at Mahi's house"	10 October 2013
5	"Mahi doubts Gopi's fiancee"	11 October 2013
6	"Mahi's grave mistake"	14 October 2013
7	"Mahi Sagar's Friendship of Love"	15 October 2013
8	"Hemu doubts Mahi-Sagar"	16 October 2013
9	"Hemu shares his concern with Bapuji"	17 October 2013
10	"Bapuji's health degrades"	18 October 2013
11	"Mahi-Sagar get married"	21 October 2013
12	"Bapuji's critical surgery"	22 October 2013
13	"Mahi-Sagar reach Mehta House"	23 October 2013
14	"Mehta's are shocked"	24 October 2013
15	"Rohit and Soniya accept Mahi"	25 October 2013
16	"Mahi's desperate efforts"	28 October 2013
17	"Anusuya forgives Sagar but does not accepts Mahi"	29 October 2013
18	"Mahi plans to impress Anusuya"	30 October 2013
19	"Mahi's efforts to impress Anusuya"	31 October 2013
20	"Mahi prepares lunch for Anusuya"	1 November 2013
21	"Mahi lands in Anusuya's office"	4 November 2013
22	"Mahi Sagar spend some quality time"	5 November 2013
23	"Mahi angers Anusuya"	6 November 2013
24	"Mehta's prepare for Diwali"	7 November 2013
25	"Bhavesh Mama arrives in Mehta house"	8 November 2013
26	"Diwali Pooja"	11 November 2013
27	"Mehta family's happy time"	12 November 2013
28	"Mahi impresses Bhavesh's family"	13 November 2013
29	"Mahi cooks like Anusuya"	14 November 2013
30	"Mahi creates space for Anusuya and Rajiv"	15 November 2013
31	"Mini-Uttrayan at Mehta's"	18 November 2013
32	"Kite - Flying Competition and memorable moments"	19 November 2013
33	"Riya wants to stay back"	20 November 2013
34	"Anusuya accepts Mahi; Mahi adamant to send Riya back"	21 November 2013
35	"Suicide"	22 November 2013
36	"Divorce of Anusuya's Mausa and Maasi"	25 November 2013
37	"Keys"	26 November 2013
38	"I. Q. Test"	27 November 2013
39	"Mehta's turn Punjabi's - Part 1"	28 November 2013
40	"Mehta's turn Punjabi's - Part 2"	29 November 2013
41	"Anusuya's Fake Mamaji"	2 December 2013
42	"Search for Kaamwali Bai"	3 December 2013
43	"A child in house - Bittu"	4 December 2013
44	"Mehta family's interview"	5 December 2013
45	"Bittu's Mischief causes heavy loses"	6 December 2013
46–47	"Corruption (International Anti-corruption Day Special)"	7 December 2013
48	"Sagar's look-alike"	9 December 2013
49	"Mahi's birthday"	10 December 2013
50	"Classical Dance vs Modern Dance"	11 December 2013
51	"Bahu Atma-Nirbhar Yojana"	12 December 2013
52	"A Unique Thief"	13 December 2013
53	"Is Mahi pregnant ?"	16 December 2013
54	"Marathon - Part 1"	17 December 2013
55	"Marathon - Part 2"	18 December 2013
56	"Vastu Dosh"	19 December 2013
57	"An Illegal Construction"	20 December 2013
58	"A soul transfer"	23 December 2013
59	"Soniya's Drawings"	24 December 2013
60	"Merry Christmas"	25 December 2013
61	"Gifts"	26 December 2013
62	"Soniya's Dharmatic Belief"	27 December 2013
63	"Housewife vs Working Women"	30 December 2013
64	"Good Bye 2013 vs Welcome 2014"	31 December 2013
65	"Loan Recovery"	1 January 2014
66	"Mami over Mummy"	2 January 2014
67	"Retrieving Chef Kanhaiyalal"	3 January 2014
68	"Silent Mahi"	6 January 2014
69	"Saas Bahu Ka Role Exchange"	7 January 2014
70	"Mahi's learns driving"	8 January 2014
71	"Anusuya doesn't want anyone to use her things"	9 January 2014
72	"Mahi to manage Mehta's household"	10 January 2014
73	"Mahi's Money saving plans"	13 January 2014
74	"Kite Flying Competition (Makar Sankranti Special)"	14 January 2014
75	"Divorce Affairs"	15 January 2014
76	"Blank Calls"	16 January 2014
77	"Sagar's Birthday"	17 January 2014
78	"Hypnotist Anthony Gonsalves"	20 January 2014
79	"Mehta family's new Car"	21 January 2014
80	"Falguni Pathak in Ahemdabad"	22 January 2014
81	"Ice-cream Bhajiya makes blunder"	23 January 2014
82	"Sugar-Coated Shikha"	24 January 2014
83	"General Knowledge"	27 January 2014
84	"Fake Couple in Mehta house"	28 January 2014
85	"Show-off"	29 January 2014
86	"Begums in Mehta house"	30 January 2014
87	"Mahi-Anusuya traces Corruption"	31 January 2014
88	"Controlling Hunger"	3 February 2014
89	"Sagar's broken toe"	4 February 2014
90	"Mahi-Anusuya creates Noise Pollution"	5 February 2014
91	"Shooting in Mehta house"	6 February 2014
92	"Saas Ka Badlaa ?"	7 February 2014
93	"Ghar Me Panchayat"	10 February 2014
94	"Mahi Sagar Ke Bina"	11 February 2014
95	"Ignored"	12 February 2014
96	"Sagar feels leftout"	13 February 2014
97	"Valentine's Day"	14 February 2014
98	"Anusuya's ill health"	17 February 2014
99	"Romance"	18 February 2014
100	"Mahi-Anusuya at peace ?"	19 February 2014

=== Episode 101 - 200 ===
No.	Title	Original release date
101	"Discolored Wall"	20 February 2014
102	"Gyaan hai toh Jahan hain"	21 February 2014
103	"Mahi Sagar's Marriage Anniversary"	22 February 2014
104	"10th Class student Mili"	23 February 2014
105	"Mahi wants a new car"	24 February 2014
106	"Mahashivratri - Mahi declares a fast for Anusuya"	27 February 2014
107	"Sagar's new Job"	28 February 2014
108	"A Fake Diamond Ring"	3 March 2014
109	"Saas Ka Get-Together"	4 March 2014
110	"Timepass"	5 March 2014
111	"Padosi Huve Pareshaan"	6 March 2014
112	"Women's Day Special"	7 March 2014
113	"Namak Ki Zindagi"	10 March 2014
114	"Dhokebaaz Pati"	11 March 2014
115	"Dancing"	12 March 2014
116	"Meethi Baat"	13 March 2014
117	"Anusuya ka Janamdin"	14 March 2014
118	"Holi"	17 March 2014
119	"Nanhi Pari"	18 March 2014
120	"Sagar Bana Cricketer"	19 March 2014
121	"Anath Sagar"	20 March 2014
122	"Bhoot Bangla"	21 March 2014
123	"Satyanarayan Katha"	24 March 2014
124	"Tayyar Huyi Mahi"	25 March 2014
125	"Mahi Huyi Pagal"	26 March 2014

=== Episode 201 - 300 ===
No.	Title	Original release date
TBA	TBA	2014

=== Episode 301 - 400 ===
No.	Title	Original release date
TBA	TBA	2014

== Season 2 ==
Due to immense success of Mahisagar, JD Majethia produced its second season as Naya Mahisagar with comedy and supernatural fantasy genre which started on 22 February 2016 and ended on 8 August 2016 with 119 episodes due to low TRP's.
