= Naya Mahisagar =

- Genre: Drama; Comedy; Supernatural
- Starring: Dharti Bhatt; Sandit Tiwari
- Country of origin: India
- Original language: Hindi
- No. of seasons: 1
- No. of episodes: 119

Production
- Producer: Hats Off Productions
- Camera setup: Multi-camera
- Running time: Approx. 23 minutes

Original release
- Network: BIG Magic
- Release: 22 February – 8 August 2016

Related
- Mahi Sagar

Naya Mahisagar is an Indian drama television series which premiered on 22 February 2016 on BIG Magic and ended on 8 August 2016 with 119 episodes. The series is produced by Hats Off Productions. It stars Dharti Bhatt and Sandit Tiwari in the lead roles. She plays a character of Mahi.

== Seasons ==
Season	Episodes	Originally Broadcast		Timeslot
Season	Episodes	First aired	Last aired	Timeslot
1	400	7 October 2013	15 April 2015	7.30 pm
2	119	22 February 2016	8 August 2016	7.30 pm

== Plot ==
After a month, Mahi and Sagar return from Mahi's village- Verakhadi, Anusuya becomes upset as Mahi brings Anusuya's mother-in-law's statue back from a garbage dump which initially was as at a crematorium which she herself insisted for with a smiling face and describing जिंदगी के आखरी स्टेशन पर भी हस्ते हुवे जाना चाहिए .

After a series of events, Mahi learns about the presence of DadiSaas's entity in house. Initially, she scared about this thing and called for help but all in the family called her mentally ill. Eventually, Mahi and DadiSaas became friends. DadiSaas always made antics to trouble Anusuya but ending Mahi in trouble. DadiSaas always tricks Chandraguta (God who keeps tracks of the dead) into stealing any of his tools.

DadiSaas always make fun of Anusuya and ends up landing Mahi in trouble. Once, a demoness pairs up with Anusuya (hypnotized) and tries to teach DadiSaas a lesson. This makes all the members of house a non-living thing. Finally Lord Shiv comes to the rescue but instead takes DadiSaas away from Mahi forever. Hence, Mahi and DadiSaas are separated.

== Cast ==
=== Main ===
- Dharti Bhatt as Mahi
- Pranoti Pradhan as Anusuya Mehta
- Sandit Tiwari as Sagar Mehta
- Ketki Dave as Dadi Saas
- Ketki Dave as Dadi Saas (dead)
  - Apara Mehta replaced Ketki Dave as Daadi Saas

=== Recurring ===
- Ankur Malhotra as Rohit Mehta
- Namrata Dhameja as Soniya
- Raashul Tandon
- Sudesh Berry

== Production ==
=== Development ===
Owing to the popularity of the previous season Mahisagar, which was made over 400 episodes, this sequel titled Naya Mahisagar was launched.

=== Casting ===
Dharti Bhatt reprised her role as Mahi Sagar Mehta, Sandit Tiwari reprised his role of Sagar Mehta. Vandana Pathak was replaced by Pranoti Pradhan as Anusuya Mehta and her character was made negative. Ketki Dave was cast as Dadi Saas who was later replaced by Apara Mehta. Ankur Malhotra and Namrata Dhameja returned for their role of Rohit Mehta and Soniya Rohit Mehta. Bawarchi Kanhiyalal was replaced with Pauna Bhaiya.

=== Cancellation ===
Due to low response towards its supernatural genre, the show was pre-maturely cancelled on 8 August 2016
