= Shubhashish Jha =

Indian actor

- Born: Bihar, India
- Education: B.Tech in Computer Science and Technology
- Alma mater: Manipal Institute of Technology, Manipal, India
- Occupation: Actor
- Years active: 2015–present
- Known for: Hurdang; Jiji Maa; Jijaji Chhat Parr Koii Hai
- Height: 183 cm (6 ft 0 in)

Shubhashish Jha is an Indian actor who is best known as Vidhaan Rawat in Jiji Maa and then notably as Jijaji in Jijaji Chhat Parr Koii Hai.

== Early life ==
Shubhashish Jha was born on 8 March 1995 in Purnia, Bihar. Jha attended Don Bosco, Patna and Delhi Public School, Vasant Kunj, New Delhi. Then, he pursued B.Tech in Computer Science and Technology from Manipal Institute of Technology (MIT), Manipal, India.

== Career ==
Jha started his acting career as a boxer in Channel V India show Twist Wala Love opposite Twinkle Patel. In the same year, he was roped in to play the parallel lead role of Sameer in Zee TV popular show Qubool Hai, for which he was much appreciated. In 2017, Jha was roped in to play the parallel lead of Vidhaan Rawat opposite Bhavika Sharma in Jiji Maa and rise to fame with this role.

Jha was last seen playing the main lead and titular role of Jijaji in SAB TV series Jijaji Chhat Parr Koii Hai opposite Hiba Nawab. Jha would also be making his film debut with the upcoming film Hurdang.

== Filmography ==
=== Television ===
Year	Title	Role	Notes	Refs
2015	Twist Wala Love	Samar	Debut / Lead role	
2015–2016	Qubool Hai	Sameer	Parallel Lead	
2017	MTV Big F	Kabir (S2, Episode 8)	Lead role	
2017–2019	Jiji Maa	Vidhaan Rawat	Parallel Lead	
2019	Laal Ishq	Venu (Episode 75)	Lead role	
2021	Jijaji Chhat Parr Koii Hai	Jijaji / Jitendra Jamvant Jindal	Lead role	

=== Films ===
Year	Title	Role	Notes	Refs
2022	Hurdang	Ranjan		

== See also ==
- List of Indian actors
- List of Indian television actors
