= Jijaji Chhat Parr Koii Hai =

Indian television series

- Genre: Sitcom; Horror
- Written by: Manoj Santoshi
- Screenplay by: Raghuvir Shekhawat
- Story by: Sanjay Kohli; Shashank Bali; Manoj Santoshi; Raghuvir Shekhawat
- Directed by: Shashank Bali; Ritwik Mukherjee
- Creative director: Harshada Pranav Pathak (Potnis)
- Starring: Hiba Nawab; Shubhashish Jha
- Theme music composer: Souvyk Chakraborty
- Opening theme: Yeh Jo Hai Adhuri
- Ending theme: O Mere Sajna Kyun Aise Satate Ho
- Country of origin: India
- Original language: Hindi
- No. of seasons: 1
- No. of episodes: 82

Production
- Producers: Sanjay R Kohli; Binaifer S Kohli
- Cinematography: Dhimant Vyas
- Editors: Pravesh J Shetty; Mayur Bhimani
- Camera setup: Multi-camera
- Running time: 23–24 minutes
- Production company: Edit II Entertainment

Original release
- Network: Sony SAB
- Release: 8 March – 10 September 2021

Related
- Jijaji Chhat Per Hain

Jijaji Chhat Parr Koii Hai (transl. Brother-in-law, Someone is on the terrace) is an Indian television horror comedy series that aired from 8 March 2021 to 10 September 2021 on Sony SAB. Produced by Edit II Production, it starred Hiba Nawab and Shubhashish Jha. The series was a spiritual sequel of the 2018 series Jijaji Chhat Per Hain.

== Plot ==
Two families, the Sharmas and the Jindals live in a two-story mansion in Punjabi Bagh, whose ownership is claimed by both and are constantly at loggerheads. Mystery revolves around the mansion where an abandoned locked room is said to be haunted. The ghost, Chandraprabha, is a look-alike of her great-granddaughter, Connaught Place Sharma, known as CP.

In the midst of all the unlikely events happening in the mansion, Jitendra Jamvant Jindal, known as JiJaJi, plans to acquire the entire mansion by marrying CP but his plans often backfire because Chandraprabha does not want him and CP to bond. Despite her relentless efforts to keep Jitendra separated from CP, Jitendra starts falling for CP when she saves his life every time Chandraprabha tries to kill him. CP too starts falling for Jitendra seeing his caring and affectionate attitude towards her.

Jitendra decides to face the ghost himself to save the two families and his love, CP. Jitendra weakens Chandraprabha using Jaldiram and Jamwant's college friend/crush Mayuri's enchanted powder and nail such that she remains entrapped in the abandoned room. However, before Jitendra leaves, Chandraprabha narrates to him how she killed her husband, Yuvraj, and then killed herself, by jumping into the well because of the curse of the bangle. She also tells Jitendra that all daughters born in the family are bound by the same curse. Thus, Chandraprabha convinces Jitendra that whatever happened with her is also bound to happen with CP and asks him to keep CP away from marriage. In reality, Chandraprabha made up the story. Chandraprabha also warns Jitendra that if he discloses the curse to CP then the curse will affect her immediately. Jitendra having fallen truly and deeply in love with CP promises Chandraprabha that he will never marry CP nor allow her to marry anyone else to protect her from the curse.

Later, when Jitendra tries to distance himself from CP, the latter tries to woo him using all possible means. Soon, Jitendra falls prey to one of CP's plans and lets out that he too loves her but he disagrees to marry her. CP concludes that after overpowering the ghost, Jitendra's behaviour and affection towards her has changed. CP decides to learn the reason for Jitendra's changed behaviour, so, she dresses up as Chandraprabha and makes Jitendra reveal the truth about the curse.

After learning the truth, CP challenges Chandraprabha that hers and Jitendra's love is so strong that they can overcome any curse. CP soon learns that the person who has a symbol of a peacock on his/her body can remove the curse. She starts hunting for that person and it turns out to be her father, Jaldiram. It is also revealed that Chandraprabha too has her own selfish motives. In reality there was no curse. She wants to become immortal and had to sacrifice the most precious thing to her. Hence she sacrificed her husband and killed herself as per the ritual. Her soul can become most powerful and immortal by entering CP's body until CP is maiden that’s why she tricked Jitendra into not marrying her.

In the end, when Chandraprabha tries to use Jaldiram to win her intentions. Jitendra reaches there on time, saves Jaldiram and foils Chandraprabha's plans. Later, he overpowers her and pushes her into the haunted well. Both the families and Jaldiram appreciate Jitendra's heroism. Then, Jitendra proposes to CP and is accepted by both families.

In the final scene Chandraprabha leaves a suspense by saying, "Hum wapis aayenge"(I will be back)

== Cast and characters ==
=== Main ===
- Hiba Nawab as
  - Connaught Place Sharma aka CP/Crime Patrol by Jitendra: Jaldiram and Sofia's daughter, Zorawar and Chakraal's niece and Chandra Prabha's brother's great-granddaughter. Jitendra's love interest. A free-spirited, smart and stubborn yet fun-loving girl who is eager to marry. She has a best friend named Titli. Her catchphrase is "Siyappe hain by God!". Initially, she regularly fought with Jitendra and also insulted the Jindals, later, she falls for Jitendra. (2021)
  - Chandraprabha: Yuvarajchandra's wife. Mysterious ghost who is the sister of CP's great-grandfather. She has haunted the mansion since her death. She wanted to kill CP and possess her body on her 21st birthday and become immortal. She even sacrificed her husband for her evil motives. (2021)
- Shubhashish Jha as Jitendra Jamwant Jindal aka JiJaJi: Jamwant and Bijli Devi's son. CP's love interest. He is a humorous, cultured and obedient auto-mechanic who owns a garage named "Jijaji Auto Works". Initially, he always fought with CP and insulted the Sharmas, later, he falls in love with CP. (2021)
- Anup Upadhyay as Jaldiram Sharma/Titu uncle by Jitendra: Owner of Jaldiram Sweets, CP's father and Sofia's husband. He has a symbol of two peacocks on his head. He shares a love-hate relationship with Jamwant and often roasts the Jindals. He does not want any relationship to happen between Jitendra and CP. (2021)
- Soma Rathod as Sofia Sharma (née Bakshi): CP's mother, Jaldiram's wife and Zorawar and Chakraal's sister who sometimes behaves weirdly. She shares a love-hate relationship with Bijli and often roasts the Jindals. (2021)
- Jitu Shivhare as Jamwant Jindal aka Nanhe: Jitendra's father, Bijli Devi's husband and Gulzar's adoptive father. He is lazy. He shares a love-hate relationship with Jaldiram and often roasts the Sharmas. (2021)
- Sucheta Khanna as Bijli Devi Jindal: Jitendra's mother, Jamwant's wife and Gulzar's adoptive mother. She is pretty yet silly and speaks broken English. She shares a love-hate relationship with Sofia and often roasts the Sharmas. (2021)
- Vipin Heero as Gulzar: Jamwant's and Bijli Devi's adopted son and Jitendra's best friend, he often roasts both the Sharmas and the Jindals. He wants to be a famous poet and often talks in poetic verses which annoys everyone. (2021)

=== Recurring ===
- Raashi Bawa as Titli/Tittu by CP: Manager intern at Jaldiram Sweets and CP's best friend. Bunty's love-interest. She has the habit of taking selfies with CP using different emotive poses. (2021)
- Saurabh Kaushik as Bunty: Waiter at Jaldiram Sweets. He has a crush on Titli. He once kidnapped Titli to impress her but was failed by Jitendra. (2021)
- Feroz Khan as Advocate Chakraal Bakshi: Zorawar and Sofia's brother. He fights the property suit for the Sharmas against the Jindals. (2021)
- Sumit Arora as Advocate Vigyanchand Arora: Son of Advocate Gyanchand. He fights the property suit for the Jindals against the Sharmas. (2021)
- Nagin Vadel as Advocate Gyanchand Arora: Father of Advocate Vigyanchand. He used to fight the property suit for Jindals before his son. Now, he is completely paralyzed and only accompanies his son on a wheelchair during the property dispute between the Jindals and the Sharmas. He says "yup" in unlikely situations. (2021)
- Soneer Vadhera as Inspector Gulati: SHO of Punjabi Bagh police station who is often involved in mishaps involving the Jindals and the Sharmas. He also investigates the murders and issues caused by Chandraprabha. He has the habit of kissing people when he is happy. (2021)
- Sohit Soni as Constable Rathi: Inspector Gulati's assistant who often stays around the Jindals and Sharmas because of their conflict. (2021)
- Tannaz Irani as Mayuri: Jamvant and Jaldiram's college friend/crush who has a piece of profound knowledge on ghosts and paranormal activities. She is more powerful than Chandraprabha but her soul was pushed into the haunted well by Chandraprabha, due to a mistake caused by Jamvant and Jaldiram. She has been comatose since then. (2021)
- Buneet Kapoor : Yuvarajchandra: Chandraprabha's husband. He loves his wife, Chandraprabha. But, later he was killed by her for her evil intentions. (2021)
- Nitin Jhadav as Ghissu: Owner of Ghissu Ice Cream. He has a habit of asking questions to everyone. Basically, when CP and Jitendra was discussion about something. (2021)

== Production ==
=== Development ===
On 8 February 2021, Hiba Nawab confirmed returning to the second season of Jijaji Chhat Per Hain.

=== Casting ===
With the release of first promo, Hiba Nawab, Anup Upadhyay, Soma Rathod and Feroz Khan were confirmed returning to the series. Shubhashish Jha was cast to play the lead role. Raashi Bawa and Sumit Arora were also confirmed making comeback to the series. Besides Jitu Shivhare, Sucheta Khanna, Vipin Heero and Nagin Wadel were cast.

=== Release ===
The first promo of the series was released on 12 February 2021 featuring Hiba Nawab and Shubhashish Jha.

=== Broadcast ===
The series was put on hold for three months due to COVID-19 Lockdown in Maharashtra from 13 April 2021. In early June 2021, the government of Maharashtra permitted shooting within the state with certain restrictions and shooting of the series started on the sets abiding with the rules and restrictions set up by the government. The series then started airing its fresh episodes after a three-month break from 5 July 2021.

== See also ==
- List of Hindi comedy shows
