= Dharti Bhatt =

Indian television actress

- Born: Ahmedabad, Gujarat, India
- Occupations: Actress; model
- Years active: 2012–present
- Known for: Mahisagar; Kya Haal, Mr. Paanchal?; Santoshi Maa – Sunayein Vrat Kathayein; Woh Toh Hai Albelaa

Dharti Bhatt is an Indian actress who primarily works in Hindi television. She is known for her roles as Rupmati "Rupa" Baditop in Taarak Mehta Ka Ooltah Chashmah, Mahi in Mahisagar, Pratibha in Kya Haal, Mr. Paanchal?, Rashmi in Woh Toh Hai Albelaa, and Vatsala in Dangal TV's Purnimaa.

== Early life ==
Dharti Bhatt is from a traditional Gujarati family and is from Ahmedabad.

== Career ==
Bhatt started her television career in 2012 with Love Marriage Ya Arranged Marriage, where she played Netra Sisodiya. In 2013, she played Sukanya in Jodha Akbar.

From 2013 to 2015, she portrayed the title role of 'Mahi' in Mahisagar. In 2016, she again played 'Mahi' in Naya Mahisagar.

From 2017 to 2019, she played Pratibha Panchal in Star Bharat's Kya Haal, Mr. Paanchal?. Next, she joined &TV's Paramavatar Shri Krishna as Devi Parvati. And Colors TV's Roop – Mard Ka Naya Swaroop as Sewa.

In 2020, she portrayed Dr. Nidhi in &TV's Santoshi Maa – Sunayein Vrat Kathayein. In 2021, she played Nayantara in Colors TV's Shakti – Astitva Ke Ehsaas Ki.

From December 2022 to June 2023, she played Rashmi Nakul Choudhary in Star Bharat's Woh Toh Hai Albelaa. From September 2023 to February 2024, she portrayed the role of Vatsala in Dangal TV's Purnima.

In August 2025 she joined Taarak Mehta Ka Ooltah Chashmah as Rupmati "Rupa" Baditop Binjola, the wife of Ratan Singh Binjola - a Rajasthani couple.

== Television ==
Year	Serial	Role	Ref.
2012–2013	Love Marriage Ya Arranged Marriage	Netra Sisodiya	Supporting role
2013	Jodha Akbar	Sukanya	Recurring
2013–2015	Mahisagar	Mahi Sagar Mehta	Lead Role
2016	Naya Mahisagar	Mahi	Lead Role
2017–2019	Kya Haal, Mr. Paanchal?	Pratibha Panchal	Lead Role
2019	Paramavatar Shri Krishna	Devi Parvati	Recurring
2019	Roop – Mard Ka Naya Swaroop	Sewa	Supporting role
2020	Santoshi Maa – Sunayein Vrat Kathayein	Dr. Nidhi	Negative Lead
2021	Shakti – Astitva Ke Ehsaas Ki	Nayantara	Supporting role
2021	Sargam Ki Sadhe Saati	Pinky	Recurring
2022–2023	Woh Toh Hai Albelaa	Rashmi Nakul Choudhary	Negative Lead
2023–2024	Purnimaa	Vatsala	Negative Lead
2025–present	Taarak Mehta Ka Ooltah Chashmah	Rupmati Binjola "Rupa"	Lead Role

== Awards and nominations ==
Year	Work	Award	Category	Result
2019	Kya Haal, Mr. Paanchal?	Indian Telly Awards	Best Actress in Comic Role	Nominated
2026	Taarak Mehta Ka Ooltah Chashmah	Indian Television Academy Awards	Best Actress - Comedy - TV	Pending

== See also ==
- List of Hindi television actresses
- List of Indian television actresses
