= Rakhi Vijan =

Indian actress

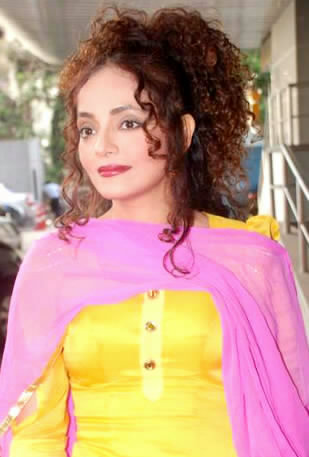
- Vijan at the launch of TV serial Madhubala in 2012.
- Born: Rakhi Vijan; 21 July 1977 (age 49)
- Years active: 1993–present
- Known for: Sweety Mathur from Hum Paanch; Monica Malpani from Sajan Re Phir Jhoot Mat Bolo
- Spouse: Rajiv Tandon (m. 2004; div. 2010)

Rakhi Vijan (formerly Tandon), is an Indian actress best known for her role of Sweety Mathur in the popular Indian classic sitcom Hum Paanch. She made her acting debut in Dekh Bhai Dekh. She also acted in Golmaal Returns as Anthony Gonsalves' wife and Krrish 3 as Mrs. Sharma. She was a contestant on the Indian reality show Big Boss in the second season in 2008. She is currently playing Kamini, the antagonist in Sony SAB's Lo Chudail Chali Sasural.

== Personal life ==
Vijan was married to Rajiv Tandon, brother of actress Raveena Tandon.

== Filmography ==
=== Movies ===
Year	Title	Role
1997	Humko Ishq Ne Mara	
2008	Money Hai Toh Honey Hai	Mukti Kapoor
2008	Golmaal Returns	Julie Gonsalves
2010	Sadiyaan	
2011	Thank You	King's wife
2013	Krrish 3	Mrs. Sharma

=== Television ===
Key
†	Denotes television productions that have not yet been released

Year	Title	Role
1994	Banegi Apni Baat	Shraddha
1995	Baat Ban Jaaye	Rakhi
1995	Hum Paanch	Sweety Mathur
1995	Tehkikaat	Sapna
1996	Hum Aapke Hain Woh	Teji
1996-1997	Mr. Mintoo	
1998	Cincinnati Bublaboo	
1998	Heena	Ruby
1999	Hera Pheri	Rashmi Premi
1999	Professor Pyarelal	Kiran
2002	Hum Hain Dilwale	Reena
2003–07	Jassi Jaissi Koi Nahin	Anjali "Angel" Suri
2003	Pyar Zindagi Hai	Simi
2004	Jasoos 005	
2006	Johny Aala Re	Anchor
2006	Party	
2007–2008	Jiya Jale	Chandan's maternal aunt
2008	Bigg Boss 2	Contestant
2010–2011	Geet – Hui Sabse Parayi	Sweety Chaddha
2011–2013	Mrs. Kaushik Ki Paanch Bahuein	Billo Rani
2012–2014	Madhubala – Ek Ishq Ek Junoon	Roma
2015-2016	Gangaa	Prabha
2016	Darr Sabko Lagta Hai	Rita
2017	Meri Durga	Subhadra
2017-2018	Sajan Re Phir Jhoot Mat Bolo	Monica Malpani
2019-2020	Naagin 4	Ketki Rasik Parekh
2020	Tera Kya Hoga Alia	Simran Kohli
2022–2023	Faltu	Sumitra
2026–present	Lo Chudail Chali Sasural	Kamini Raheja
