= Amarjeet Jaikar =

Indian Playback Singer

Amarjeet Jaikar is an Indian playback singer from Bihar who rose to prominence after his viral videos on Instagram caught the attention of the Indian Idol 13 team. His talent was also supported on social media by Sonu Sood, who gave him break in his film Fateh (2025 film) as a playback singer. Subsequently, Jeet Gannguli featured him in several of his compositions, followed by Himesh Reshammiya, who gave him a break in his album Himesh Ke Dil Se. Jaikar later collaborated with Payal Dev on the song "Intezaar Karne Do", penned by Kunaal Vermaa.
