= Wah Bhai Wah =

Indian TV Series

- Genre: Reality; Stand-up comedy
- Created by: Shailesh Lodha
- Directed by: Deepak
- Presented by: Shailesh Lodha
- Theme music composer: Lakhan Sinha
- Country of origin: India
- Original language: Hindi
- No. of seasons: 1
- No. of episodes: 401

Production
- Executive producer: Shwetha Shetty
- Camera setup: Multi-camera
- Running time: 45 minutes
- Production company: Shemaroo Entertainment

Original release
- Network: Shemaroo TV
- Release: 19 June 2022 – 5 August 2023

Wah Bhai Wah is an Indian comic poetry series produced by Shemaroo Entertainment which premiered on 19 June 2022 on Shemaroo TV. The series is hosted by Shailesh Lodha.

== Overview ==
In every episode, three noteworthy poets of Hindi literature are invited and given a chance to recite their poem in front of the whole audience.

== Guests ==
- Rakesh Bedi
- Praveen Parimal
- Kavi Gaafil Swami
- Ankit Bathla
- Prachi Bohra
- Shubhanshi Raghuvanshi
- Himanshu Soni
- Neha Harsora
- Ridheema Tiwari
- Abhishek Singh Pathania
- Priya Khushboo
- Shaily Priya Pandey
- Gaurika Sharma
- Arti Singh
- Harsh Nagar
- Pradeep Joshi
- Priyanka Dhawale

== Production ==
The show started on 19 June 2022. At the conclusion of last episode, Shailesh Lodha announced his decision to take a break from the show. This break could be of varying duration, either short or long. Last episode aired on 5 August 2023.
