= Azaad (TV channel) =

Indian General Entertainment Channel (2021-2022)

- Country: India
- Headquarters: Noida, India

Programming
- Language: Hindi

Ownership
- Owner: Beginnen Media Pvt. Ltd.
- Key people: Bharat Ranga (MD); Rachin Khanijo (CMO)

History
- Launched: 23 April 2021; 5 years ago
- Closed: 10 August 2022; 4 years ago
- Replaced by: Chumbak TV

Availability

Streaming media
- MX Player

Azaad TV was an Indian Hindi language general entertainment channel that was owned by Beginnen Media. This channel aired re-runs from other television channels and some original shows of their own. Azaad was also available on DD Free Dish. Azaad TV was shut down on 10 August 2022.

== Former programming ==
Acquired series

Year	Name
2021	Chacha Chaudhary
2021	Draupadi
2021	Kahani Chandrakanta Ki
2021	Kesariya Balam Aavo Hamare Des
2021	Solhah Singaarr
2021-2022	Amrit Manthan
2021-2022	Gustakh Dil
2021-2022	Tumhari Paakhi
2022	Bahut Khoob
2022	Ghar Ki Lakshmi Betiyann
2022	Kasamh Se
2022	Madam Ki Paathshala
2022	Naaginn
2022	Parrivaar

=== Original Programming ===
Year	Name	Genre
2021-2022	Lovepantii	Drama
2021-2022	Meri Doli Mere Angana	Drama
2021-2022	Pavitra: Bharose Ka Safar	Drama
2021-2022	Hari Mirch Lal Mirch – Ek Tikhi Ek Karari	Comedy
2022	Chhotki Chhatanki	Drama
2022	Kasturi	Drama
2022	Do-Do Baat VIP Ke Saath	Comedy
