= Khap (disambiguation) =

A khap is a community organisation in India representing a clan or a group of related clans.

Khap can also refer to:

- Khap (film), 2011 Hindi film
- Khap, regional folk music style in Northern Laos; see Mor lam
- KHAP, Christian radio station in Chico, California
