= Shaadi Ke Siyape =

Indian television comedy series

- Genre: Sitcom
- Created by: Full House Media
- Starring: Sheen Dass; Mishkat Varma; Bhavya Gandhi; Rahul Singh; Shagun Sharma
- Opening theme: Shaadi Ke Siyape....
- Country of origin: India
- Original language: Hindi
- No. of seasons: 1
- No. of episodes: 24

Production
- Producers: Sonali Jaffer; Amir Jaffer
- Production location: Mumbai
- Camera setup: Multi-camera
- Running time: 42 minutes approx.

Original release
- Network: &TV
- Release: March 16 – June 2, 2019

Shaadi Ke Siyape (Wedding Problems) is an Indian television comedy series produced by Sonali Jaffer under Full House Media. It premiered on 16 March 2019 on &TV. It stars Mishkat Varma and Sheen Dass.

== Plot ==
Fancy Aunty, a wedding planner and the owner of a marriage hall, encounters a group of aliens from Jupiter who are on a mission and hires them as her assistants.

== Cast ==
=== Main ===
- Sheen Dass as Bijli
- Mishkat Varma as Viraat
- Bhavya Gandhi as Nanku
- Rahul Singh as Pandit
- Alka Kaushal as Fancy Aunty
- Ankita Bahuguna as Katrina

=== Special appearances ===
- Shagun Pandey in Episodes 1
- Dolly Chawla in Episodes 1
- Shaily Priya Pandey as Sweety in Episodes 4
- Siddharth Sen in Episodes 4
- Gaurav Sharma as Shaurya in Episodes 5
- Kstij Soni as Tripti in Episodes 5
- Chandani Bhagwani in Episodes 7
- Bhavya Sachdeva in Episodes 7
- Khushwant Walia in Episodes 11
- Amika Shail as Prachi (bride) in Episodes 18

=== Episodes ===
Episode No.	Telecast date	Title	Cast
1.	March 16, 2019	Face does not matter in love...	Shagun Pandey, Dolly Chawla
2.	March 17, 2019	Kidnappe Marriage	
3.	March 23, 2019		
4.	March 24, 2019	Bengali Marriage	Shaily Priya Pandey as Sweety, Siddharth Sen
5.	March 30, 2019	Shaadi mein Talwarbaazi	Gaurav Sharma as Shaurya, Kstij Soni as Tripti
6.	March 31, 2019		
7.	April 6, 2019	Shaadi mein Baccha	Chandani Bhagwani, Bhavya Sachdeva
8.	April 7, 2019		
9.	April 13, 2019	Shaadi Mein Chor	
10.	April 14, 2019	Shaadi mein Vote ka Siyappa	
11.	April 20, 2019	Nikah mein dulhe ka Siyappa	Khushwant Walia
12	21 April 2019		
13	27 April 2019		
14	28 April 2019		
15	4 May 2019		
16	5 May 2019		
17	11 May 2019		
18	12 May 2019		Amika Shail as Prachi (bride)
19	18 May 2019		
20	19 May 2019		
21	25 May 2019		
22	26 May 2019		
23	1 June 2019		
24	2 June 2019		
