= Kismat Ki Lakiro Se =

2022 Indian drama television series

- Genre: Drama
- Starring: Shaily Priya Pandey; Abhishek Singh Pathania; Varun Sharma; Sumati Singh
- Composer: Veer Pandya
- Country of origin: India
- Original language: Hindi
- No. of seasons: 1
- No. of episodes: 535

Production
- Producer: Rashmi Sharma
- Running time: 22 minutes
- Production company: Rashmi Sharma Telefilms

Original release
- Network: Shemaroo Umang
- Release: 5 September 2022 – 18 May 2024

Kismat Ki Lakiro Se (transl. From The Writings Of Destiny Itself) was an Indian Hindi-language drama television series which premiered on 5 September 2022 on Shemaroo Umang .It was the longest running serial of Shemaroo Umang. Produced by Rashmi Sharma under the banner of Rashmi Sharma Telefilms, it stars Shaily Priya Pandey, Abhishek Singh Pathania, Varun Sharma and Sumati Singh. It went off air on 18 May 2024 after completing 535 episodes.

The show is also dubbed into Malayalam as Aaro Viral Meetti on Flowers TV from 29 April 2024 to 27 July 2024. and as Vidhiyude Varikalil Ninnu on Shemaroo Malayalam Youtube Channel.

== Plot ==
Shraddha and Keerti, two sisters with contrasting personalities, face various ups and downs of life as fate plays a major role in their destinies. Set in Kanpur, the sisters come from a humble family with supportive parents. Shraddha's wedding is fixed with Varun, a young man from an affluent joint family in Kanpur. Varun, however, falls for the younger and more attractive Keerti. On the wedding day, Varun secretly arranges for goons to stall Shraddha while she returns from the saloon. As a result, to save face, Shraddha's parents get Keerti married to Varun. Once Shraddha returns, the families feel duty bound and get her married to Varun's cousin Abhay. The new couples embark on their marital lives - Keerti as a spoilt wife who does not conform to the rules of the household and Shraddha as the dutiful wife and daughter-in-law who is in an awkward marriage with the earnest yet jobless Abhay. Several misunderstandings and arguments later, Abhay and Shraddha form a strong bond both standing up for each other and eventually falling in love. Meanwhile, everyone in the family becomes aware of Keerti's dishonest and rude ways.

== Cast ==
- Shaily Priya Pandey as Shraddha Dikshit Tripathi: Saksham and Yashvi's elder daughter; Keerti and Bablu's sister; Siya and Saanvi's mother (2022–2024)
- Abhishek Singh Pathania as Abhay Tripathi: Anuj and Devyani's son; Tanuja's step-son; Aarti's half-brother; Varun's cousin; Shraddha's husband; Siya and Saanvi's father (2022–2024)
- Sumati Singh as Inspector Keerti Dikshit Tripathi: Shraddha's younger sister; Varun's widow; Gulaal's wife; Dilip and Naina's daughter-in-law; Saksham and Yashvi's younger daughter; Kiara's mother; Bablu's elder sister; Raj's ex–girlfriend (2022–2024)
- Varun Sharma as Varun Tripathi: Dilip and Naina's son; Keerti's husband; Abhay's elder cousin; Kiara's father (2022–2024) (Dead)
- Farooq Saeed as Saksham Dikshit: Yashvi's husband; Shraddha, Keerti and Bablu's father; Siya, Saanvi and Kiara's maternal grandfather (2022–2024)
- Khushi Rajput as Yashvi Saksham Dikshit: Saksham's wife; Shraddha, Keerti and Bablu's mother; Siya, Saanvi and Kiara's maternal grandmother (2022–2024)
- Arup Pal as Dilip Tripathi: Naina's husband; Varun's father; Anuj's elder brother; Keerti's father-in-law; Kiara's grandfather (2022–2023) (Dead)
- Eva Shirali as Naina Dilip Tripathi: Dilip's widow; Varun's mother; Keerti's mother-in-law; Kiara's grandmother (2022–2024)
- Ashish Kaul / Rudra Kaushish as Anuj Tripathi: Tanuja's husband; Devyani's ex–boyfriend; Abhay and Aarati's father; Dilip's younger brother; Shraddha's father-in-law; Siya and Saanvi's grandfather (2022–2024) / (2024)
- Tanu Vidyarthi as Tanuja Anuj Tripathi: Anuj's wife; Abhay's stepmother; Aarati's mother; Shraddha's mother-in-law; Siya and Saanvi's step-grandmother (2022–2024)
- Dolly Kaushik as Aarati Tripathi: Anuj and Tanuja's daughter; Abhay's younger half-sister; Siya and Saanvi's paternal aunt; Kunal's wife (2022–2024)
- Nadia Himani as Ritu Tripathi: Dilip and Anuj's younger sister; Varun, Abhay and Aarati's paternal aunt; Siya, Saanvi and Kiara's paternal grandaunt (2022–2024)
- Sheetal Jaiswal as Sonia: Abhay's one sided obsessive ex–lover; Aarati and Avni's friend (2022–2023) (Dead)
- Avtar Vaishnani as Child Bablu Dikshit: Saksham and Yashvi's son; Shraddha and Keerti's younger brother; Siya, Saanvi and Kiara's maternal uncle (2022–2023)
- Avyaan Tiwari as Bunty Boy (2023)
- Apsara Kashyap as Payal: Abhay's one-sided obsessive lover; Saanvi's surrogate mother; Reema's friend (2023)
- Shatabdi Mazumdar as Reema: Payal's friend (2023)
- Urmila Sharma as Payal's mother (2023)
- Mahi Soni as Siya Tripathi: Shraddha and Abhay's elder daughter; Anuj and Tanuja's granddaughter; Saanvi's elder sister; Aarati's elder niece; Kiara's younger cousin (2023)
- Kisha Arora as Saanvi Tripathi: Shraddha and Abhay's younger daughter; Payal's surrogate daughter; Anuj and Tanuja's granddaughter; Siya's younger sister; Aarati's younger niece; Kiara's younger cousin (2023)
- Lavishka Gupta as Kiara Tripathi: Keerti and Varun's daughter; Dilip and Naina's granddaughter; Siya and Saanvi's elder cousin (2023)
- Sapan Gulati as Mohit: Shraddha's friend (2023)
- Aishwarya Sethi as Avni: Varun's one sided obsessive lover; Aarati and Sonia's friend (2023)
- Saurabh Agarwal as Ritu's husband (2023)
- Shilpa Kataria as Senior Inspector Kiran Mathur: Samar's mother (2023)
- Poonam Dwivedi as Poonam: Friend of Keerti Dikshit (2023)
- Hassan Ahmed as Samar Mathur: Kiran's son (2023)
- Pradeep Duhan as Raj Singhania: Keerti's boss and ex-boyfriend; Ragini's husband (2023)
- Jiya Mustafa as Ragini Raj Singhania: A businesswoman; Kunal's elder sister; Raj's wife (2023)
- Nirbhay Singh as Kunal: Ragini's younger brother; Aarati's husband; Sonia's murderer (2022; 2023–2024)
- Khushwant Walia as Dr. Neeraj (2023)
- Aryan Hasan as Bodyguard Of Gulabo
- Sunidhi Chauhan as Dr. Roshni: Abhay's one sided obsessive lover (2023–2024) (Dead)
- Shivani Gosain as Devyani: Anuj's ex–girlfriend; Abhay's mother; Gauri's adoptive mother (2024)
- Prateek Parihar as Gulaal: A don; Keerti's second husband; Shraddha's one sided obsessive lover (2024)
- Minoli Nandwana as Gauri: Devyani's adopted daughter; Abhay's one sided obsessive lover (2024)

== Development ==
The series was announced by Rashmi Sharma Telefilms for Shemaroo Umang. Principal photography commenced in Mumbai, with Shaily Priya Pandey, Abhishek Singh Pathania, Varun Sharma and Sumati Singh as leads. The promos were released in August 2022. It premeried on 5 September 2022 on Shemaroo Umang.

== Soundtrack ==
Kismat Ki Lakiro Se

Soundtrack album by Veer Pandya
- Released: 2022
- Genre: Romance; Soundtrack
- Length: 2:30
- Language: Hindi
- Label: Shemaroo Entertainment
- Producer: Rashmi Sharma

The title track is composed by Veer Pandya.

Tracklisting
No.	Title	Singer(s)	Length
1.	"Kismat Ki Lakiro Se" (Male)	Veer Pandya	2:30
Total length:			2:30

== See also ==
- Chahenge Tumhe Itna
