= Jag Janani Maa Vaishno Devi – Kahani Mata Rani Ki =

Indian television mythological series

- Also known as: Jag Janani Maa Vaishno Devi
- Genre: Mythology
- Created by: Rashmi Sharma
- Written by: Utkarsh Naithani; Anshumali Jha
- Directed by: Bhagwan Yadav; Sandeep Vijay
- Creative directors: Mallika Sahay; Dharm Singh
- Starring: Paridhi Sharma; Madirakshi Mundle; Ishita Ganguly; Shaily Priya Pandey
- Country of origin: India
- Original language: Hindi
- No. of seasons: 1
- No. of episodes: 207

Production
- Producers: Rashmi Sharma; Pawan Kumar Marut
- Production location: Ramdev Film City
- Camera setup: Multi-camera
- Running time: 22 minutes
- Production company: Rashmi Sharma Telefilms

Original release
- Network: Star Bharat
- Release: 30 September 2019 – 2 October 2020

Jag Janani Maa Vaishno Devi – Kahani Mata Rani Ki is an Indian mythological television series that premiered on 30 September 2019 on Star Bharat. It is based on the life of Goddess Vaishno Devi. The series was produced by Rashmi Sharma and Pawan Kumar Marut under Rashmi Sharma Telefilms. The show aired its last episode on 2 October 2020.

The series was relaunched on 17 October 2020, during the Navaratri festival, under the name Jag Janani Maa Vaishno Devi – Mahima Mata Rani Ki.

== Plot ==
The story begins with the battle between the gods and demons escalating. In order to end all the evil on Earth, the Tridevi—the trinity of Lakshmi, Saraswati, and Parvati / Kali—combine their powers to create a divine force. This divine force is born in the Kingdom of Sripuram and is named Vaishnavi. Upon her birth, her father is called by the Tridevi in the heavens. They inform him that Vaishnavi is not an ordinary human and has a specific goal to complete. They instruct him to let her make her own decisions once she becomes aware of her powers, to which he agrees. When Queen Samriddhi, Vaishnavi's mother, learns of this promise, she tries to keep Vaishnavi away from the temple of Vishnu out of fear of losing her daughter. Eventually, however, Vaishnavi discovers the temple and realizes her powers.

The show follows a series of incidents where Vaishnavi helps the people in her kingdom. She offers food to the villagers, leading a girl named Bharti to befriend her and gift her a shawl. This shawl helps Vaishnavi assume her real form as Vaishno Devi. When the festival of Navaratri begins, Vaishnavi narrates the story of the Navadurga (locally known as a Jagrata). During the puja, Bharti sees a vision of Vaishnavi taking the form of the Navadurga and defeating demons without violence, intending to end evil in humanity. The Tridevi then impart knowledge to Vaishnavi and awaken her inner powers. She meditates for several years to fully transform into Vaishno Devi.

Years later, Vaishnavi has grown up and sets out to help her devotees. Bhairon Nath, a tantrik, is sent by his guru to find a divine energy he sensed. He tracks down Vaishno Devi, but develops inappropriate feelings for her. Vaishnavi assumes her divine form and warns him. When he refuses to listen, she beheads him. The Tridevi and Trimurti had previously agreed that if Vaishno Devi killed anyone, Shiva would end the world. However, Vaishno Devi explains to Shiva that she granted Bhairon Nath salvation, which placates him.

== Cast ==
=== Main ===
- Maisha Dixit as young Vaishno Devi (2019–2020)
- Puja Banerjee / Paridhi Sharma as Vaishno Devi: The combined incarnation of Saraswati, Lakshmi, and Kali.

=== Recurring ===
- Hrishikesh Pandey as King Ratnakar Sagar: Vaishnavi's father
- Toral Rasputra as Queen Samriddhi: Vaishnavi's mother

The Three Goddesses (Tridevi)

- Manisha Rawat as Saraswati: Goddess of the arts, wisdom, music, and literature; Brahma's consort
- Madirakshi Mundle as Lakshmi: Goddess of wealth and prosperity; Vishnu's consort
- Ishita Ganguly as Parvati / Kali: Goddess of power and destruction of demons; Shiva's consort

The Three Gods (Trimurti)

- Amardeep Garg as Brahma: The creator god; Saraswati's consort
- Vikas Salgotra as Vishnu: The protector god; Lakshmi's consort
- Kapil Arya as Shiva: The destroyer god; Parvati's consort

Other recurring cast

- Sumedh Mudgalkar as the narrator (voiceover)
- Preetika Chauhan as Bhudevi: Goddess of the earth, an aspect of Lakshmi
- Sailesh Gulabani as Indra: King of the gods
- Vikas Verma as Moor: Former ruler of the Netherworld
- Athar Siddiqui as demon Shrikaal
- Vijay Badlani as Swarna Sagar: Ratnakar's younger brother
- Preet Kaur Madhan as Kadika: Swarna's wife
- Aryavart Mishra in a dual role as:
  - child Chandra Sagar: Swarna and Kadika's son
  - child Prasad: Shridhar and Sulochana's son
- Shantanu Monga as adult Chandra Sagar
- Aarav Chowdhary as Mahipal: Senapati of Shripuram
- Kunal Bakshi as Maharaj Vimargsen
- Esha Pathak as teenage Bharti
- Anjali Abrol / Razia Khanam / Shaily Priya Pandey as adult Bharti: Vaishnavi's best friend and a true devotee
- Varsha Chandra / Neha Bam as Bhakti: Bharti and Shullu's mother
- Ankit Rana as adult Shushlok (Shullu): Bharti's younger brother
- Saurav Singh as adult Khagendra
- Surbhi Gautam as adult Adhira
- Rajesh Dubey as Pandit Loknath
- Saurabh Deshpande / Gaurav Kothari as adult Rechak: Loknath's son
- Rohit Kumar as adult Kumbhak: Loknath's son
  - Pranit Gopalani as child Kumbhak
- Sikandar Kharbanda as Pisach Raj: King of ghosts
- Sandeep Sharma as Pandit Jatashankar
- Himanshu Soni as Rama: King of Ayodhya
- Ram Yashvardhan / Ankit Mohan as Bhairavnath: A tantrik who sets out to find Vaishnavi
- Saurabh Sewal Asr / Mana Singh Parmar as Vibhutinath: Bhairavnath's younger brother
- Kuldeep Dubey as Shridhar: A true devotee of Goddess Vaishno Devi
- Preity Sahay as Sulochana: Shridhar's wife
- Danish Akhtar Saifi as Hanuman
- Vishal Dhingrra as Mandhari
- Adi Irani as Devendra: An influential village chief with no religious beliefs
- Geeta Tyagi as Jyoti: Devendra's wife
- Naveen Pandita as Narendra: Devendra and Jyoti's son
- Aarushi Sharma as Kishori: Devendra and Jyoti's daughter
- Khushwant Walia as Bheema: Devendra's nephew
- Ravi Kothari as Sankata
- Shyam Lal as Damru
- Dipti Patil as Sugna
- Gaurrav Walia as Bhadrak: Bhairavnath's friend
- Prity Singhaniya as Lali
- Payal Gupta as Latika: Prachandasur's lover
- Aakriti Sharma as Rajjo
- Yogendra Kumaria as Suraj Bhan: Rajjo's father
- Khushi Rajpoot as Kulotama: Rajjo's step-mother
- Pradeep Kumar Tiwari as Banke: Kulotama's brother
- Sonal Parihar as Naulakha
- Aishwarya Raj Bhakuni as Shubhangi: A bride kidnapped by the demon Dumdubi
- Rishabh Bhardwaj as a groom; Shubhangi's husband
- Rohit Choudhary as demon Dumdubi (Bhuvan)
- Unknown as demon Sankala: Dumdubi's mother
