= Nivedita Tiwari =

Indian actress

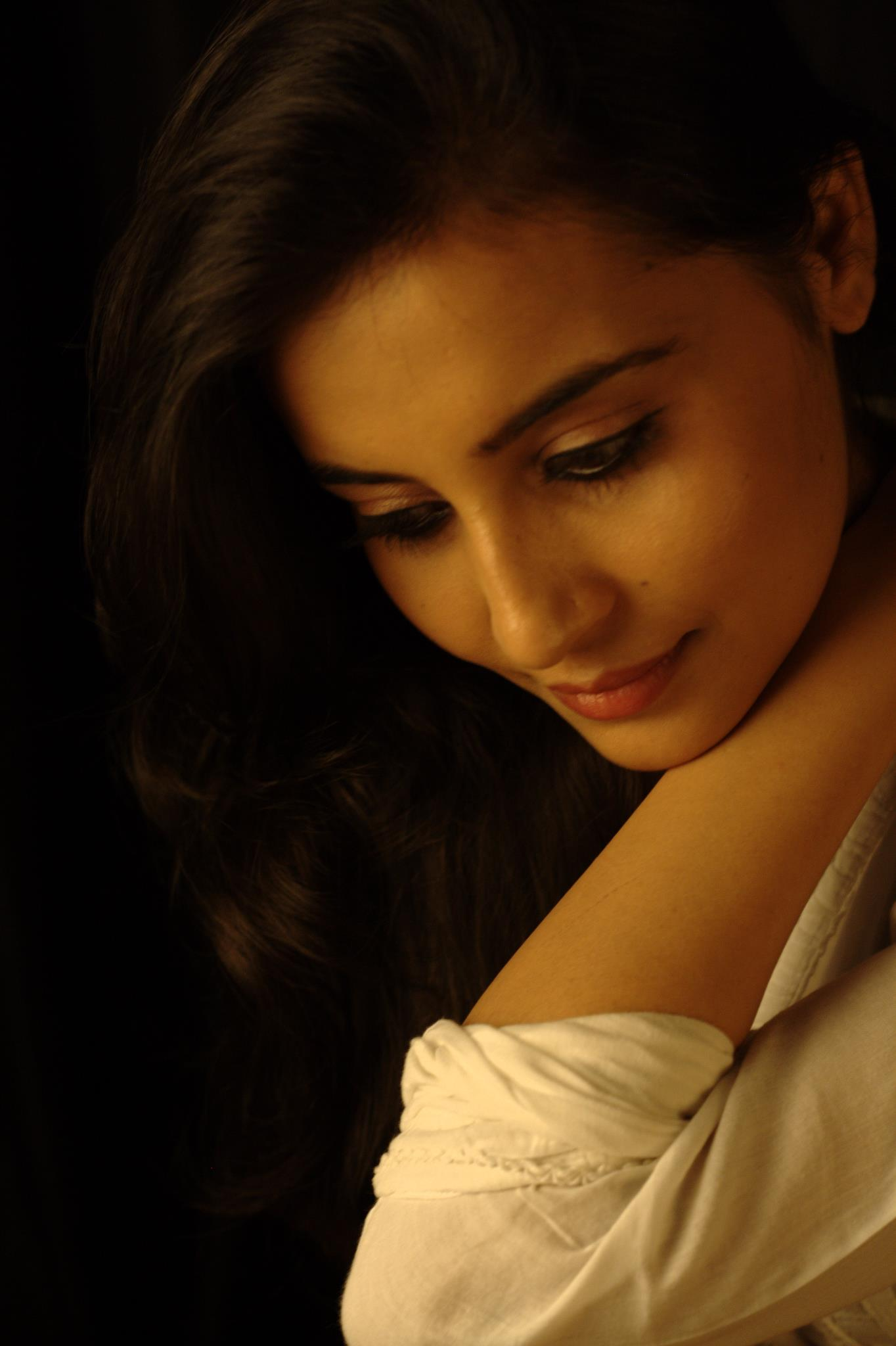
- Nivedita Tiwari 2012
- Born: Ayodhya, Uttar Pradesh, India
- Education: JB Academy, Ayodhya Ramjas College, University of Delhi
- Occupation: Actress
- Years active: 2010–2016; 2019
- Website: Nivedita Tiwari; Nivedita Tiwari Blog

Nivedita Tiwari is an Indian actress best known for her role as Runjhun in Zee TV's Bhagonwali - Baante Apni Taqdeer and Supriya on &TV's Gangaa.

== Early life ==
Nivedita was born and raised in Ayodhya, Uttar Pradesh. She completed her schooling at JB Academy, Ayodhya, and attended the University of Delhi where she studied English Literature.

== Film and television career ==
Nivedita gained initial recognition when she was shortlisted as one of the top three candidates vying for the role of Anandi in the Colors television show Balika Vadhu. She was later cast in a lead role in Bhagonwali - Baante Apni Taqdeer as Runjhun Mishra, a girl who is destined to bring good luck wherever she goes. The show aired on Zee TV from 2010–2012. During this period, Nivedita made guest appearances on an episode of Yahaaan Main Ghar Ghar Kheli and Star Ya Rockstar. She also appeared on an episode of Ram Milaayi Jodi in a dance performance.

Nivedita acted in the movie Khap as Sureeli, a girl who is murdered by the men in her town because she chose to marry someone from the same village. The movie touched on the issues surrounding honor killings.

At the end of 2012, she appeared on two different episodes of the weekly television show Lakhon Mein Ek on STAR Plus. Each episode of the show reflects a different story based on real life events. In the first appearance, she was cast opposite Ravi Dubey portraying the character of Afreen. The episode focused on the issue of dowry and told the real-life story of Sohail and Afreen's fight against this practice. Next, she acted alongside Ankit Bathla and Rita Bhaduri in an episode that told the story of Preeti and Sunil and their struggle to get married. She also appeared in an episode of Yeh Hai Aashiqui alongside Raj Singh Arora and Pallavi Gupta.

In 2014, she was cast in the lead role of Sahara One's Phir Jeene Ki Tamanna Hai as Devyani and as Parvati in Neeli Chatri Waale. Nivedita has appeared in several television commercials.

Nivedita appeared as Supriya on Gangaa and next will be seen in the film Fraud Saiyaan produced by Prakash Jha. She is currently a Research Fellow at Vision India Foundation, a New Delhi based think tank which works on public leadership amongst the youth.

== Personal life ==
Nivedita enjoys creative writing, singing and reading. She regularly posts her own works on her blog. Presently, she is working for the New India Junction.

== Filmography ==
Film
Year	Title	Role	Notes
2011	Khap	Sureeli	
2019	Fraud Saiyaan	Mala	
2019	Maternity Blues	Nivedita	

Television
Year	Title	Role	Channel	Notes
2011	Umeed Ka Naya Chehra	Runjhun	Zee TV	Guest Appearance; Episode Date: 19 June 2011
2011	Yahaaan Main Ghar Ghar Kheli	Runjhun	Zee TV	Guest Appearance; Episode Date: 25 October 2011
2011	Ram Milaayi Jodi	Herself	Zee TV	Guest Appearance; Episode Date: 11 October 2011
2012	Star Ya Rockstar	Runjhun	Zee TV	Guest Appearance; Episode Date: 29 October 2011
2010-2012	Bhagonwali-Baante Apni Taqdeer	Runjhun	Zee TV	Protagonist
2012	Lakhon Mein Ek	Afreen/Preeti	Star Plus	Episode Date: 11 November, 23 December 2012
2013	Yeh Hai Aashiqui	Prachi	Bindass	Episode Date: 1 November 2013
2014	Phir Jeene Ki Tamanna Hai	Devyani	Sahara One	
2014, 2015	Pyaar Tune Kya Kiya	Sapna/Naina	Zing	
2015	Neeli Chatri Waale	Parvati	Zee TV	
2015	Gangaa	Supriya Pulkit Chaturvedi	&TV	
