= Keerti Nagpure =

Indian television actress

- Born: Pune, Maharashtra, India
- Occupation: Actress
- Years active: 2010–present
- Known for: Parichay – Nayee Zindagi Kay Sapno Ka; Desh Ki Beti Nandini; Ek Veer Ki Ardaas...Veera; Kuldeepak; Mil Gayi Manzil Mujhe; Pyar Ka Pehla Naam: Radha Mohan
- Height: 5 ft 2 in (1.57 m)
- Relatives: Aniket Nagpure (brother); Sujata Nagpure (sister)

Keerti Nagpure is an Indian actress who primarily works in Hindi television. She made her acting debut in 2010 with Olakh portraying Vibhavari Talwarkar. Nagpure is best known for her portrayal of Siddhi Malik Chopra in Parichay – Nayee Zindagi Kay Sapno Ka and Nandini Pandey Raghuvanshi in Desh Ki Beti Nandini.

From May 2022 to January 2024, Nagpure portrayed Tulsi Mohan Trivedi and from January 2024 to March 2024 Nagpure portrayed Damini Bharadwaj in Pyar Ka Pehla Naam: Radha Mohan.

== Career ==
=== Debut, breakthrough and success (2010-2016) ===
Nagpure started her career with Star Pravah Talent Hunt Competition. She made her acting debut with the Marathi serial Olakh portraying Vibhavari "Vibha" Talwarkar from 2010 to 2011.

She made her Hindi television debut with Parichay portraying Siddhi Malik Chopra opposite Samir Soni from 2011 to 2013. It proved as a major turning point in her career. She received nominations and recognition for her performance.

Nagpure made her film debut in 2012 with the Marathi film Zalay Dimag Kharab portraying the lead. From 2013 to 2014, she portrayed Nandini Pandey Raghuvanshi in Desh Ki Beti Nandini opposite Rafi Malik.

She then portrayed Priyanka Gobhandarkari in Beta Hi Chahiye in 2013, Geet Singh in Ek Veer Ki Ardaas...Veera in 2015 and Pranali in Naagarjuna – Ek Yoddha in 2016.

=== Further career and recent work (2017-present) ===
In 2017, she portrayed Vidya Purohit in Kuldeepak opposite Shardul Thakur. The same year, she made her web debut with Sony LIV's Shaurya portraying Vineeta Ashok Kamte opposite Raqesh Bapat.

From 2018 to 2019, she portrayed Drishti opposite Rahil Azam, Meena opposite Hasan Zaidi and Radha opposite Ankit Gupta in three different episodes of Laal Ishq. In 2021, she portrayed Tanu Prajapati in Mil Gayi Manzil Mujhe.

Since May 2022, she is seen portraying Tulsi Mohan Trivedi in Pyar Ka Pehla Naam: Radha Mohan.

== Television ==
Year	Serial	Role	Notes	Ref.
2010–2011	Olakh	Vibhavari "Vibha" Talwarkar	Marathi show	
2011–2013	Parichay – Nayee Zindagi Kay Sapno Ka	Siddhi Malik Chopra	Lead Role	
2013–2014	Desh Ki Beti Nandini	Nandini Pandey Raghuvanshi	Lead Role	
2015	Ek Veer Ki Ardaas...Veera	Geet Singh	Negative Role	
2017	Kuldeepak	Vidya Purohit	Lead Role	
2018–2019	Laal Ishq	Drishti	Episode #28: "Blind Love"	
2018–2019	Laal Ishq	Meena	Episode #134: "Girgit"	
2018–2019	Laal Ishq	Radha	Episode #180: "Rooh Pishachni"	
2021	Mil Gayi Manzil Mujhe	Tanu Prajapati	Lead Role	
2022–2024	Pyar Ka Pehla Naam: Radha Mohan	Tulsi Mohan Trivedi	Supporting Role	
2024	Pyar Ka Pehla Naam: Radha Mohan	Damini Bharadwaj	Negative Role	

=== Special appearances ===
Year	Title	Role	Ref.
2012	Na Bole Tum Na Maine Kuch Kaha	Siddhi Malik Chopra	
2012	The Late Night Show - Jitna Rangeen Utna Sangeen	Herself	
2013	Beta Hi Chahiye	Priyanka Gobhandarkari	
2016	Naagarjuna – Ek Yoddha	Pranali	

=== Films ===
Year	Title	Role	Notes	Ref.
2012	Zalay Dimag Kharab	Unknown	Marathi film	

=== Web series ===
Year	Title	Role	Notes	Ref.
2017	Shaurya	Vineeta Ashok Kamte		

== Awards and nominations ==
Year	Awards	Category	Work	Results	Ref.
2011	Golden Petal Awards	Most Lokpriya Jodi (with Samir Soni)	Parichay	Won	
2012	Indian Telly Awards	Fresh New Face - Female	Parichay	Nominated	
2012	Indian Telly Awards	Best Onscreen Couple (with Samir Soni)	Parichay	Nominated	
2012	Gold Awards	Debut in a Lead Role (Female)	Parichay	Nominated	

== See also ==
- List of Indian television actresses
