= Parichay: Nayee Zindagi Kay Sapno Ka =

Indian drama television series

- Also known as: Parichay
- Genre: Soap opera
- Created by: Balaji Telefilms
- Written by: Dialogues; Dheeraj Sarna
- Screenplay by: R M Joshi; Binita Desai; Anil Nagpal; Vikas Tiwari; Vandana Tiwari
- Story by: R M Joshi; Binita Desai; Anil Nagpal; Vikas Tiwari; Jayesh D. Patil
- Directed by: Mujammil Desai, Ajay Kumar
- Creative directors: Doris Dey; Tasneem Mehta; Mona Arora; Chloe Ferns; Madhura Rapsang
- Starring: See below
- Theme music composer: Lalit Sen
- Country of origin: India
- Original language: Hindi
- No. of seasons: 1
- No. of episodes: 417

Production
- Producers: Ekta Kapoor; Shobha Kapoor
- Production locations: Mumbai, Maharashtra
- Cinematography: Suhas Shirodkar & Rajan Singh
- Editors: Vikash Sharma; Vishal Sharma; Sandeep Bhatt
- Camera setup: Multi-camera
- Running time: 20 minutes
- Production company: Balaji Telefilms

Original release
- Network: Colors TV
- Release: 9 August 2011 – 16 March 2013

Parichay – Nayee Zindagi Kay Sapno Ka (transl. Introduction of Dreams of new life), simply known as Parichay, is an Indian soap opera that aired on Colors TV from 9 August 2011 to 16 March 2013. The show is produced by Ekta Kapoor and Shobha Kapoor under their banner Balaji Telefilms.

== Plot ==
Kunal Chopra lives in an apartment with his parents and his siblings, Gaurav, Anand and Raveena. Once a career-oriented and successful lawyer, Kunal has lost his zest at life and considers himself a failure, resulting in him not doing anything and Gaurav becoming the sole breadwinner. Kunal joins a law firm under Advocate D.K. Thakral but refuses to take up a case given by Thakral on moral grounds, leading him to be fired. Kunal later joins a construction company but is also fired due to Thakral's actions. On the other hand, Siddhi Malik is living with her brother Kapil and sister Khushboo. Ten years later, Anand graduates from law school. Siddhi and Anand fall in love and are set to marry. However, a day before the marriage, the Chopra family learns about the demise of Anand in a bomb blast. Kunal marries her to make his grieving mother happy, breaking his already deteriorating relationship with Thakral's daughter, Richa. He later finds his life changing for the better through Siddhi's arrival. Later, Kunal has Raveena married to Vikram, the brother of Gaurav's wife, Seema, despite Raveena being in a relationship with Richa's brother, Rohit.

Kunal and Siddhi consummate their marriage, however, Kunal, thinking that the act of consummation was one-sided, figures that Siddhi is not happy in the marriage and still harbors feelings for Anand, and files for divorce, shattering Siddhi, who finds herself in love with him. Seema encourages Siddhi to make Kunal realize his love for her. Meanwhile, Richa, conspiring to separate the couple, falsely accuses Kunal of raping her at a party, leading to which Kunal, initially fighting the case himself, is forced to transfer the case to Siddhi. Siddhi is then kidnapped by Rohit and injured in the process, but manages to win the case. She and Kunal later confess their love for each other during a family trip to Ujjain. Siddhi is then revealed to be pregnant. Meanwhile, Kunal catches Gaurav in an affair and banishes him from the family.

After an argument in which Siddhi leaves Kunal, she unknowingly crashes into Rohit in an accident with her car. Richa and her father blame Siddhi for his death, while Kunal decides to prove her innocence. Thakral, however, manages to trap Kunal, and he is sent to jail. Rohit is later revealed to be alive. Siddhi, Vikram, and Raveena get hold of him, but Richa, swearing revenge on Siddhi, kills her own brother, who testified against her earlier in Kunal's rape case. Richa strikes a deal with Siddhi, who agrees to sign the divorce papers and behave rudely towards the Chopra family. Siddhi accuses Kunal in the court of murder, but Richa proves him innocent and Siddhi as the culprit. Siddhi is incarcerated, and a heartbroken Kunal promises to never interfere in her life again. While in jail, she meets Sulekha Diwan and delivers male twins. Richa steals the first twin and convinces Kunal that Siddhi wanted to kill him. Upon discovering this, Siddhi asks Sulekha to give the second baby to the Chopra family. Sulekha initially complies, but when she learns that Kunal is planning to marry Richa, she returns the baby to Siddhi. Kunal ultimately decides not to marry Richa.

9 years later, Siddhi, who is released, thinks that Kunal is happy with Richa, so she decides to move on, goes through a makeover, and is shown to be living with Sulekha and her son, Abhay Diwan. Kunal, now losing trust in everything, was back to drinking, gambling, and fighting. The twins, both named Anand (after the Chopras' deceased younger son), grow up. The elder Anand Chopra lives with Kunal, while the younger Anand Diwan lives with Siddhi and is raised as a spoilt brat. Anand Chopra, tired of seeing Kunal in a dire state, convinces him to fight a case. On the day of hearing, Kunal spots Siddhi after nine years. The elder Anand is selected for a dance competition, and Kunal sells his gold medal that he earned from a law school to pay for the fees. During the competition, the elder Anand meets his younger brother. After the competition, Siddhi and Kunal come face to face. Both end up working in Abhay's firm, in which Kunal is forced to work under her. Siddhi later realizes that Kunal and Richa are not married. Meanwhile, the two Anands realize that they are both twins and vow to reunite their parents. Abhay sends Siddhi on a trip to Bangalore to solve some legal issues, during which Kunal and Siddhi come close to each other. Kunal and Siddhi decide to start a new life with their children, but Kunal sees Siddhi marrying Abhay and decides to avoid her. Abhay files for custody of the kids, and Thakral fights his case, while Kunal fights for his children. In the court, Siddhi speaks favorably of Kunal, angering Abhay. Kunal sees Abhay strangling Siddhi, but she tells him not to interfere in her personal matters. Afterwards, the court declares Abhay and Siddhi's marriage invalid, as Kunal and Siddhi haven't divorced yet, and orders them to live under one roof for six months. The twins try their best to bring their parents together, but to no avail. Siddhi tells Kunal that she married Abhay as he would threaten her with killing the younger Anand. However, Kunal refuses to believe this. Meanwhile, during a trip to the mall, some robbers attack it and keep Siddhi at gunpoint. Kunal saves her, but in the process, they shoot the younger Anand. Abhay pays for his operation and reminds Kunal that he is a loser. Kunal pledges to change his life. Afterwards, he and the twins learn that Siddhi is injured in a blast, but are unable to find her. Kunal later discovers that Abhay kidnapped Siddhi and has him arrested. Kunal and Siddhi reunite, and the show ends with the Chopra family recovering their mansion.

== Cast ==
=== Main ===
- Samir Soni as Kunal Chopra:
  - Siddhi's husband, twins Anand's father, Veena and Raj's eldest son, Anand, Gaurav and Raveena's eldest brother
- Keerti Nagpure as Siddhi Kunal Chopra:
  - Kunal's wife, twins Anand's mother, Kapil and Shilpa's sister

=== Recurring ===
- Apurva Jyotir as Anand Chopra: Siddhi and Kunal's twin son
- Anmol Jyotir as Anand Chopra, Siddhi and Kunal's twin son
- Ayaz Khan as Gaurav Chopra, Kunal's younger brother, Seema's husband, Anokhi and Ishani's father
- Arti Singh as Seema Gaurav Chopra née Garewal, Vikram's elder sister, Gaurav's wife, Anokhi and Ishani's mother
- Prerna Wanvari as Raveena Vikram Garewal née Chopra, Kunal's younger sister, Vikram's wife
- Tapeshwari Sharma as Anokhi Chopra, Seema and Gaurav's elder daughter
- Megha Israni as Young Anokhi Chopra
- Richa Srivastava as Ishani Chopra, Seema and Gaurav's younger daughter
- Saurabh Raj Jain as Anand Chopra, Kunal's second younger brother, Siddhi's ex-fiancé/lover (deceased)
- Vivek Mishra as Raj Chopra: Veena's husband, Kunal, Gaurav, Anand and Raveena's father
- Alka Amin as Veena Chopra, Raj's wife, Kunal, Gaurav, Anand and Raveena's mother
- Deepak Sandhu as Vikram Garewal: Seema's younger brother, Raveena's husband
- Amit Singh Thakur as Sudhanshu Garewal: Seema and Vikram's father
- Madhurima Tuli/Mona Vasu/Sonia Singh as Richa Thakral: Kunal's ex-girlfriend/fiancée
- Abhay Bhargava as Advocate D.K. Thakral: Kunal's employer, Richa and Rohit's father
- Karam Rajpal as Rohit Thakral: Richa's younger brother, Raveena's former lover
- Aruna Irani as Sulekha Diwan
- Mahip Marwaha as Lalit Dhawan
- Mahesh Shetty as Abhay Diwan
- Khushboo Shroff as Shilpa Malik: Siddhi's younger sister
- Mukesh Solanki as Kapil Malik: Siddhi's elder brother
- Nitin Sahrawat as Super Star Aman Kumar
- Gautam Rode as Vineet Saxena: Richa's ex-fiancé
- Mohit Sehgal as Aarav: Siddhi's friend
- Sidharth Shukla as Shiv
- Drashti Dhami as Madhu
- Tejasswi Prakash as Dhara

== Production ==
In early January 2013, lead Keerti Nagpure suffered facial injuries in an accident and could not shoot for the series for a few days. However, in late January 2013, she returned.

The show ended on 15 March 2013 due to decreased TRP after the time change from 9:30pm to 10:30pm (IST).

== Awards ==
- 11th Indian Telly Awards – Best Actor in a Lead Role – Samir Soni
- 5th Boroplus Gold Awards – Best Actor (Critics) – Samir Soni
- 12th Indian Television Academy Awards – Best Actor (Popular) – Samir Soni
