= Mahip Marwaha =

Indian television actor

- Born: New Delhi, India
- Occupations: Model, Actor

Mahip Marwaha is an Indian television actor. He appeared in Bollywood movie, Rabba Main Kya Karoon and shows like Parichay (TV series) and Parvarrish – Kuchh Khattee Kuchh Meethi
