= Ek Veer Ki Ardaas...Veera =

Indian television series

- Created by: Mamta Patnaik; Purnendu Shekhar
- Written by: Raghubir; Durjoy Dutta; Soumyava Goswami; Sumrit shahi Gajra Kottary; Koel Chaudhuri
- Directed by: Waseem Sabir; Jagrut Mehta
- Creative director: Amit Bhargava
- Presented by: StarPlus
- Starring: See Below
- Opening theme: Veera By Aashish Rego; Lyrics: Sharad Tripathi
- Country of origin: India
- Original language: Hindi
- No. of episodes: 805

Production
- Executive producers: Soumia Samadhiya; Karnika Saxena
- Producers: Yash Patnaik; Mamta Patnaik; Mukesh Mishra
- Cinematography: Deepak Malvankar
- Editor: Kshitija Khandagale
- Running time: 20 minutes approx
- Production company: Beyond Dreams Entertainment Private Limited

Original release
- Network: StarPlus
- Release: 29 October 2012 – 8 August 2015

Ek Veer Ki Ardaas... Veera (transl. A Brother's Prayer... Veera) is an Indian television soap opera that aired on StarPlus and streams on Hotstar, produced under Yash Patnik's Beyond Dream Production. The series premiered on 29 October 2012 and ended on 8 August 2015. It initially starred child actors Harshita Ojha and Bhavesh Balchandani and after a 15-year leap, the series starred Digangana Suryavanshi, Shivin Narang, Vishal Vashishtha, and Farnaz Shetty.

== Plot ==
Rannvijay Singh, an eight-year-old boy, lives with his parents, Ratan and Sampooran Singh, who is the Sarpanch of the village. One day, a woman named Amrita comes to the door and claims that Sampooran is the father of her daughter. Ratan insults her, but Sampooran arrives and agrees with Amrita. Observing this, Ratan is heartbroken and locks herself in a room. Guilt-ridden, Sampooran leaves the house, and Amrita dies at the door due to a terminal illness, holding the child in her arms. Deeply wounded by Sampooran's betrayal, Ratan develops a resentment toward Veera from infancy and neglects her throughout her childhood. Unaware of the adults' history, Rannvijay takes in the infant and names her Veera, caring for her as a mother. As she grows up to be a lively and brave girl, he eventually sends her to the city to complete her education.

15 years later, Veera returns home and attempts to open a solar plant in Pritampura. She reunites with her childhood bully, a grown-up and rowdy Baldev, whose righteous father, Balwant, is now the Sarpanch. During their training with farm equipment, Veera and Baldev fall in love. An aspiring singer, Rannvijay, also marries Baldev's sister Gunjan, who is Veera's childhood best friend and has always dreamed of visiting London.

Rannvijay wins an esteemed music competition, and the stardom goes to Gunjan's head as she accepts advertising offers and begins gambling to obtain cash for her luxuries. Gunjan soon becomes pregnant but wishes to prioritise her dancing career, so she schedules an abortion without telling Rannvijay. However, after hearing the child's heartbeat, she is unable to go through with the abortion and prepares to share the surprise with Rannvijay. Unfortunately, she accidentally falls on her stomach and miscarries. Once Rannvijay discovers Gunjan's initial intentions to abort, he feels hurt and betrayed. Gunjan consistently apologises, but Rannvijay takes a long time to finally forgive her. They discuss starting their family together, as Gunjan now wishes to be a mother, but her doctor informs her that, due to the miscarriage, she has become infertile, leading her to realise her mistakes.

After Baldev is mistakenly accused of a crime orchestrated by the local policeman Rajveer, who is obsessed with Veera, she marries Baldev to save him from her brother's wrath. Baldev is soon acquitted, and their marriage is accepted by the family. However, tensions arise when Veera decides to run against Baldev in the election for Sarpanch, believing that he will not make the right decisions for the village. Veera wishes to use the land to build a school, while Baldev wants to construct a shopping mall. Hurt that his wife is not supporting him, Baldev starts plotting to sabotage her campaign, creating problems between the couple. Baldev ultimately wins the election, but he and Veera remain at odds as he disregards her advice regarding political matters.

Pritampura becomes further victim to terrorists, resulting in Ratan's death when a bomb explodes. A grieving Rannvijay and Veera struggle to come to terms with this tragedy. Veera soon discovers she is pregnant and vows to allow Rannvijay and Gunjan to raise the child, as the series concludes on the day of Rakshabandhan.

== Cast ==
=== Main ===
- Digangana Suryavanshi as Veera Singh – Amrita and Sampooran's daughter; Ratan's step-daughter; Ranvijay's half-sister; Gunjan's best friend; Baldev's wife (2013–2015)
  - Harshita Ojha as Child Veera Singh (2012–2013)
  - Nishika Kataria as Baby Veera Singh (2012)
- Shivin Narang as Ranvijay "Ranvi" Singh – Ratan and Sampooran's son; Veera's half-brother; Gunjan's husband (2013–2015)
  - Bhavesh Balchandani as Child Ranvijay Singh (2012–2013)
- Vishal Vashishtha as Baldev Singh – Balwant and Bansuri's son; Gunjan's brother; Chanchali's half-brother; Veera's husband (2013–2015)
  - Devish Ahuja as Child Baldev Singh (2012–2013)
- Farnaz Shetty as Gunjan Singh – Balwant and Basuri's daughter; Baldev's sister; Chanchali's half-sister; Veera's best friend; Ranvijay's wife (2013–2015)
  - Spandan Chaturvedi / Arishfa Khan as Child Gunjan Singh (2012) / (2012–2013)

=== Recurring ===
- Sneha Wagh as Ratanjeet "Ratan" Singh – Sampooran's widow; Ranvijay's mother; Veera's step-mother (2012–2015) (Dead)
- Sudhanshu Pandey as Sampooran Singh – Ratan's husband; Amrita's lover; Ranvijay and Veera's father (2012–2013) (Dead)
- Shagufta Ali as Mrs. Singh – Sampooran's aunt; Ratan's mother-figure; Ranvijay and Veera's grandaunt (2012–2015)
- Kapil Nirmal as Nihaal "Neil" Singh – Sampooran's friend; Ratan's former one-sided love interest (2013–2014) (Dead)
- Aastha Chaudhary as Amrita Singh – Santoshi's daughter; Kartar's ex-fiancée; Sampooran's lover; Veera's mother (2012) (Dead)
- Kulbir Badersonas as Santoshi Singh – Amrita's mother; Veera's grandmother (2013)
- Harsh Vashisht as Kartar Singh – Sampooran's friend; Amrita's ex-fiancé; Gurpreet's husband (2012–13)
- Samikssha Batnagar as Gurpreet Singh – Kartar's wife (2012–2013)
- Yajuvendra Singh as Balwant Singh – Bansuri's husband; Chanchali, Baldev and Gunjan's father (2012–2015)
- Vishavpreet Kaur as Bansuri Singh – Balwant's wife, Baldev and Gunjan's mother; Chanchali's step-mother (2012–2015)
- Kanika Kotnala as Chanchali "Sonia" Singh – Balwant's daughter; Basuri's step-daughter; Baldev and Gunjan's half-sister (2014)
- Jagrati Sethia as Rajjo – Veera's classmate (2012)
- Ankit Shah as Dalbeer Singh – Ranvijay's friend (2013–2014)
  - Shazil Khan as Child Dalbeer (2012)
- Aditya Deshmukh as Jhappi – Ranvijay's friend (2013–2014)
- Daya Shankar Pandey as Surjeet Singh – Former land owner; Ratan, Ranvijay and Veera's rival (2013–2014)
- Ankit Bathla as Karan Khanna – Veera's friend and former love interest (2013–2014)
- Priyamvada Kant as Simran Kaur – Baldev's ex-fiancée (2014)
- Shaizal as Jaggi Singh – Ranvijay's friend (2014–2015)
- Prashant Chawla as Sahil – Nihal's assistant in Poland (2014)
- Jalina Thakur as Pooja Sharma (2012–2013)
- Niilam Paanchal as Amrit Kaur (2014)
- Rumi Khan as Bakhtawar Singh (2014)
- Ranvierr Chahal as Music Engineer (2014)
- Gagan Anand as Billa Singh (2014–2015)
- Rohit Bakshi as Reality Show Host (2014)
- Vivek Dahiya as Inspector Rajveer Thakur – Veera's ex-fiancé (2014)
- Usha Bachani as Manjeet Singh – Baldev and Gunjan's aunt; Deepu's grandmother (2015)
- Keerti Nagpure as Geet Singh – Manjeet's daughter-in-law; Deepu's mother (2015)
- Vrudhi Jakra as Deepu Singh – Geet's daughter (2015)
- Mayank Gandhi as Dilawar Singh (2015)
- Chaitanya Choudhury as Professor Rahul (2015)

=== Guest appearances ===
- Kratika Sengar as dancer at Baldev and Karan's farewell party (2014)
- Shibani Kashyap as Megha Kapoor (2014)
- Raj Singh as Anmol (2014)

== Production ==
=== Development ===
Before its premiere, it was titled as Sooli Upar Sej Piya Ki but was later changed to Ek Veer Ki Ardaas... Veera. The series is based on the backdrop of Punjab which premiered on 29 October 2012 replacing the series Mann Ki Awaaz... Pratigya. The title track of the series was composed and sung by composer Anand Raj Anand.

Within three months after its premiere, Veera was supposed to take a ten-year leap in its storyline. However, with the popularity of the children leads Bhavesh Balchandani and Harshita Ojha playing Ranveer and Veera, the makers postpone the leap and continued the story with them because of which Rahul Sharma who was supposed to replace Balachandani as adult Ranveer went on to do the serial Ek Ghar Banaunga.

In May 2013, the sequence of a tiger attacking the village was shot using a real tiger.

In September 2014, Darshan Raval, the contestant of the reality singing show India's Raw Star of StarPlus lend over his voice for the sequence where character Ranveer played by Narang participates in a singing competition and the sequence was filmed at the sets of India's Raw Star in Filmcity. The song sung by character Ranveer was penned by Shaarib Sabri and Toshi Sabri who also appeared as the judges of the show in the series.

=== Casting ===
In October 2013, it took a leap of 15 years where Shivin Narang and Digangana Suryavanshi replaced Balchandani and Ojha was adult Ranveer and Veera as the lead characters. Post leap, Farnaaz Shetty and Vishal Vashishtha were also cast for the lead roles of adult Gunjan and Baldev paired opposite Narang and Suryavanshi whose childhood characters played by Arishfa Khan and Devish Ahuja were recurring roles. Initially Narang rejected the role of Ranvijay when offered by the makers but later agreed for which he said, "I read about the show and realised that the storyline is very different. And my parents also forced me to accept the offer." Vashishtha auditioned for both Ranveer and Baldev's characters, but got selected for the role of Baldev for which he initially was sceptical to accept the negative role while makers convinced him.

In August 2013, Kapil Nirmal who entered the series in January 2013 quit the series with the end of his role. However, in August 2014 he returned when makers approached him but soon in December 2014 he quit the series, unhappy with the shaping of his role and his character was killed. Sneha Wagh who quit in January 2014 owing her marriage re-entered the series after the break in April 2014.

Initially, Sana Saeed was roped for a guest role of a dancer in 2014. Unsatisfied with the charges demanded by Saeed, Kratika Sengar was cast by the makers. Nisha Nagpal was supposed to play the role of Simran but could not when the makers of Masakali of Sahara One filed a complaint in CINTAA (Cine and TV Artistes’ Association) stating that she was in contact with them. Thus, she was replaced overnight by Priyamvada Kant in December 2014.

=== Cancellation ===
The show which was to end in December 2014, received an extension of six to eight months and soon in January 2015 it was shifted from its night 10:30pm slot to the evening 5:00pm (IST) slot. In September 2015, the series was confirmed going off air and ended on 10 August 2015.

=== Filming ===
Based on backdrop of Punjab, the series is mainly filmed in sets at Powai in Mumbai. Besides some sequences were filmed at some parts of Punjab, Amritsar Golden Temple and villages surrounding it and Delhi. In July 2014, a sequence was shot at Poland.

== Adaptations ==
In 2014, the series was dubbed and aired on Zee Telugu in Telugu as Meena. A dubbed version of the serial was telecast in Tamil as En Anbu Thangaikku on Vijay TV, but was discontinued after only 400 episodes were broadcast. A dubbed version of the serial was telecast in Malayalam as Manasaveera on Asianet. The series was broadcast on Indonesia in ANTV in their native language. Besides, it was dubbed and aired in 50 languages in different countries worldwide. It remade into Star Maa as Telugu television series Rakhi Poornima. It also remade in Bengali as Rakhi Bandhan which aired on Star Jalsha.

== Reception ==
The first episode of the series garnered an average rating of 2.1 TVR. However, it started to rise gradually. In March 2013, it garnered 3.1 TVR. In week 15 of 2013, it was at fifth position while the following week it dropped to tenth position in Hindi GEC list with 2.1 TVR. In first week of August 2013, it was at tenth position with 4933 TVT (Television Viewership in Thousands). In week 50 of 2013, it was the tenth most watched Hindi GEC fiction with 2.8 TVR.

In first week of 2014, it garnered 2.4 TVR while in the week three and five it got 2.4 and 2.7 TVRs In 2015 it was shifted to 5:30 and the serial still managed to get high numbers at trp ratings ranging from 1.0-1.6. No other show cant much its trp ratings on that timeslot
