= Beta Hi Chahiye =

Indian television series

- Genre: Drama
- Written by: Anupama Yadav & Vijay Pandit
- Directed by: Bhupesh Kumar, Ramesh Pandey
- Creative director: Mahua Sen
- Starring: See below
- Theme music composer: Prakash G. Nar
- Country of origin: India
- Original language: Hindi
- No. of seasons: 1
- No. of episodes: 123

Production
- Executive producer: Utkarsh Wali
- Producer: Simi Karna
- Cinematography: Gopal Pandey
- Editor: Gaurav Mishra
- Camera setup: Multi-camera
- Running time: Approx. 24 minutes
- Production company: BIG Productions

Original release
- Network: BIG Magic
- Release: 20 May – 1 November 2013

Beta Hi Chahiye is an Indian drama television series which premiered on BIG Magic on 20 May 2013. The series stars Ankit Bathla and Garima Tiwari in the main lead and is the first daily soap opera launched on BIG Magic by Reliance Entertainment. The story focuses on social issues associated with pressure for a wife to produce male offspring.

== Overview ==
The story centers around the life of a girl Saroja who faces many trials and tribulations from her in-laws after giving a birth to a girl child.

== Cast ==
- Syed Ayna ... Kanchan ( saroja's sister)
- Garima Tiwari as Saroja (main female protagonist)
- Ankit Bathla as Madhav (Saroja's husband)
- Jitendra Trehan as Girjapati
- Shravani Goswami as Kalavati
- Vipin Chahal... Vijender
- Aparna Ghoshal as Phooleshwari
- [Sonali Gupta] as Tara
- [Manish]...Sangram
- [Nikhil]...Balli
- Nisha Verma...Manju
- Keerti Nagpure as Priyanka
