= Pavitra: Bharose Ka Safar =

2021 Indian drama television series

- Genre: Drama
- Screenplay by: Anshula mathur
- Story by: pearl grey, Anshula mathur, rashmi grey
- Directed by: Dev Dutt J. Gupta
- Starring: Sheezan Khan; Shaily Priya Pandey
- Country of origin: India
- Original language: Hindi
- No. of seasons: 1
- No. of episodes: 178

Production
- Executive producer: Pearl Grey
- Producers: Santosh Singh; Rochelle Singh
- Camera setup: Multi-camera
- Running time: 22 minutes
- Production company: Parth Production

Original release
- Network: Azaad
- Release: 14 September 2021 – 9 April 2022

Pavitra: Bharose Ka Safar (transl. Sacred: Journey Of Trust) is an Indian television drama series that premiered from 14 September 2021 on Azaad. Produced by Santosh Singh, Rochelle Singh and Pearl Grey under Parth Production, it stars Sheezan Khan and Shaily Priya Pandey. It went off air on 9 April 2022 and digitally available on MX Player.

== Cast ==
- Sheezan Khan as Arya Thakur: Bade Thakur and Uma's son; Pavitra's husband (2021–2022)
- Shaily Priya Pandey as Pavitra Aarya Thakur: Pawan and Lakshmi's daughter; Arya's wife; Akash and Kavita's younger sister (2021–2022)
- Neelu Vaghela as Uma Thakur: Bade Thakur's wife; Arya, Rachana, Rekha, Vishal and Rohan's mother; Pavitra's mother-in-law (2021–2022)
- Kumar Rajput as Bade Thakur
- Siddhi Sharma as Rachana Thakur
- Shivani Chakraborty as Rekha Thakur
- Hemant Choudhary as Pawan: Lakshmi's husband; Pavitra, Akash and Kavita's father
- Deepali Kamat as Lakshmi: Pawan's wife; Pavitra, Akash and Kavita's mother
- Shubham Bagwe as Akash
- Sonia Keswani as Kavita
- Siddharth Ohri as Vishal Thakur
- Priyansh as Rohan Thakur

== Production ==
The series was announced in 2021 by Azaad. The teaser of the series was released on 14 September 2021. Shaily Priya Pandey was cast in the titular role, and was joined by Sheezan Khan as leads.
