= Varun Sharma (TV actor) =

Indian television actor

- Born: Noida, Uttar Pradesh, India
- Citizenship: Indian
- Education: Asian Academy of Film and Television from Marwah Institute, Noida
- Occupation: Television actor
- Years active: 2013–present
- Spouse: Anupriya Kapoor (m. 2022)
- Parent: Vijay Sharma (father)
- Relatives: Akshay Sharma (brother); Sorabh Sharma (brother); Varnika Sharma (sister)

Varun Sharma is an Indian television actor from New Delhi. He is well known for his roles of Anshuman Prajapati in Bhagyalakshmi and Piyush Bharadwaj in Sasural Simar Ka.

== Early life ==
Varun Sharma was born in a Brahmin family and is from Delhi. His father is from Delhi and mother is a Marathi. He studied mass communication from Asian Academy of Film and Television from Marwah Institute, Noida. He did modelling and theatre.

== Career ==
Sharma started his acting career with shows like Saraswatichandra and Doli Armaanon Ki. He played a villain as Sameer in the Channel V series Sadda Haq. In 2015, he signed on the lead role of Anshumaan Prajapati in the Show Bhagyalakshmi. He played the lead role of Aditya Rawat in Udaan in 2016. In the same year, he also appeared in the long running-show Sasural Simar Ka as Piyush Bharadwaj, Simar's son. The show ended in 2018. In 2020, he did a cameo in the film Darbaan. In early September 2021, he was cast to play a negative cameo Rohan, Nandini's (Anagha Bhosale) ex-boyfriend and obsessive lover who wants to win her back and get rid of Samar (Paras Kalnawat), her current love from their lives in Star Plus show Anupamaa and completed his role in mid October 2021.

== Television ==
| Year | Title | Role |
|---|---|---|
| 2013 | Saraswatichandra | Mohan |
| 2014 | Doli Armaanon Ki | Karan |
| 2014 | Sadda Haq | Sameer Mittal |
| 2015–2016 | Bhagyalakshmi | Anshuman "Maan" Prajapati |
| 2016 | Udaan | Aditya Rawat |
| 2016–2018 | Sasural Simar Ka | Piyush Bharadwaj |
| 2018 | Kaun Hai? | Deepak |
| 2021 | Tujhse Hai Raabta | Atharv Bapat |
| 2021 | Aapki Nazron Ne Samjha | Dr. Ritesh Barot |
| 2021 | Anupamaa | Rohan |
| 2022 | Saath Nibhaana Saathiya 2 | Agastya |
| 2022–2024 | Kismat Ki Lakiro Se | Varun Tripathi |
| 2025 | Parineetii | Daljeet Bajwa |

=== Films ===
| Year | Film | Role |
|---|---|---|
| 2020 | Darbaan | Siddhant "Siddhu" Tripathi |
