= Ankit Bathla =

Indian television actor

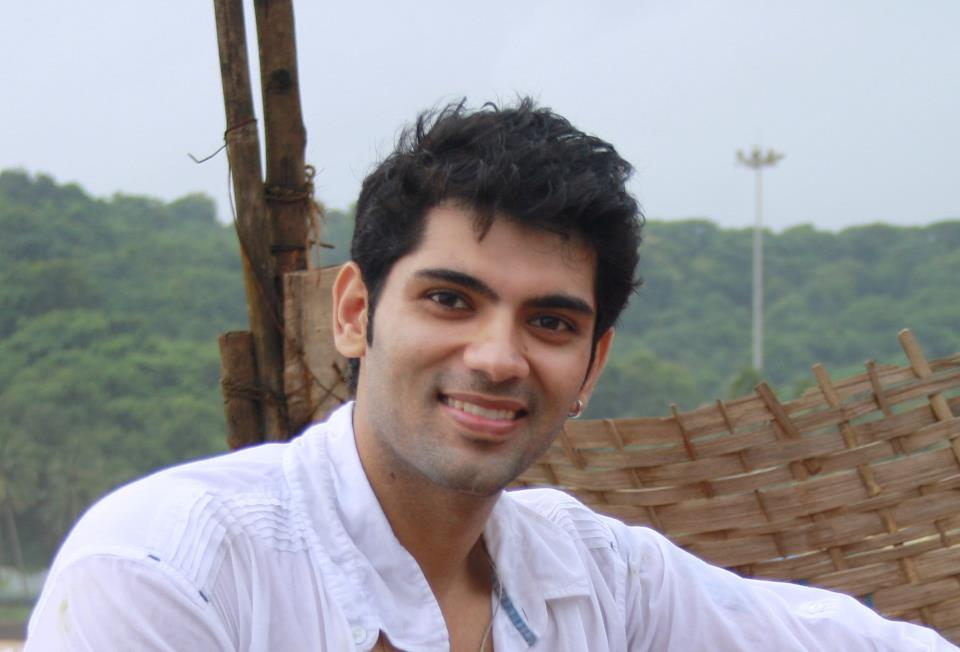
- Bhatla In 2023
- Born: 10 October 1988 (age 37); New Delhi, India
- Occupations: Actor; model
- Years active: 2009 – present
- Notable work: Thapki Pyar Ki; Naagin 4
- Height: 5 ft 10 in (178 cm)

Ankit Bathla (born 10 October 1988) is an Indian television actor known for his portrayal of Madhav in Beta Hi Chahiye, Dhruv Pandey in Thapki Pyar Ki and Akshay Khanna in Tu Sooraj Main Saanjh, Piyaji. He was last seen playing Rajat in Naagin: Bhagya Ka Zehreela Khel. He played the double role of Siddhant Sinha and Advocate Vedant Sinha in And TV's show Ghar Ek Mandir - Kripa Agrasen Maharaj Ki.

== Personal life ==
Ankit Bathla was born on 10 October 1988 to mother Mugdha Bathla and father Anil Kumar Bathla in New Delhi, India. He completed his schooling from St. Mark's Senior Secondary Public School, Meera Bagh, Delhi. He later completed his graduation in Economics (Hons) from Sri Guru Gobind Singh College of Commerce of Delhi University.

== Career ==
Ankit Bathla began working as a trainer with American Express before moving into acting. His first television appearance was on DD National in Sammaan Ek Adhikaar where he played an anti-hero. Later he acted in Bhagonwali-Baante Apni Taqdeer, playing the pivotal character Abhigyan on Zee TV, followed by Mata Ki Chowki as Arjun on Sahara One, and Hamari Saass Leela as the youngest son, Ayush, of Leela Parekh (Apara Mehta) on Colors TV.

In 2010 he played the role of Gaurav in Hum on DD National opposite Mona Vasu. Later he acted in Haar Jeet (TV series) as Abhigyan on Imagine TV. In 2013, Ankit worked on the TV show Beta Hi Chahiye as Madhav on Big Magic opposite Garima Tiwari; it was the first daily soap opera launched on BIG Magic by Reliance Entertainment. After Beta Hi Chahiye, Ankit played the role of Karan Khanna who was the love interest of Veera (Digangana Suryavanshi) in Ek Veer Ki Ardaas...Veera on Star Plus. In the fifth episode of Love by Chance (airing on Bindass) he played the role of Lieutenant colonel Kanishka Mehta.

In November 2014, Bathla joined the cast of the show Ajab Gajab Ghar Jamai (Red Dot Productions) on Big Magic playing the role of Krishna.

In March 2015, Bathla appeared in an episode of Red Dot Productions's show Halla Bol on Bindass. He appeared in Sony Entertainment Television's mythological show Sankatmochan Mahabali Hanuman which premiered on 4 May 2015. From 2015 to 2017, he played Dhruv Pandey in Colors TV's Thapki Pyar Ki. In 2016, Ankit hosted Benadryl Big Golden Voice Season 4 Finale in Mumbai. In 2017, he appeared in an Indonesian Series Cinta Di Pangkuan Himalaya on antv. On 17 March 2018, he played in a web series Love, lust and confusion by VIU India starring Tara Alisha Berry.

In 2023 Bhatla's recent release is Do Ajnabee directed by Sanjeev Kumar Rajput.

== Commercial ads ==
Ankit has done big banner ads for Bharti Airtel and Maruti Suzuki Ritz.

== Television ==
Year	Title	Role	Notes
2011	Sammaan Ek Adhikaar	Billu	
2011	Bhagonwali-Baante Apni Taqdeer	Abhigyan	
2011	Mata Ki Chowki	Arjun	
2011	Hamari Saas Leela	Ayush Parekh	
2011	Hum	Gaurav	
2012	Haar Jeet	Abhi	
2012	Hum Ne Li Hai...Shapath	Venkat	
2013	Beta Hi Chahiye	Madhav	
2013–2014	Ek Veer Ki Ardaas...Veera	Karan Khanna	
2014	Love by Chance	Kanishka Mehta	
2014	Ajab Gajab Ghar Jamai	Krishna	
2015	Sankatmochan Mahabali Hanuman	Vibhishana	
2015	Halla Bol	Aashish	
2015–2017	Thapki Pyar Ki	Dhruv Pandey	
2016	Hasi Ka Pitara	Host	
2017	Cinta di Pangkuan Himalaya	Jakir	
2018	Tu Sooraj, Main Saanjh Piyaji	Akshay	
2018	Crime Alert	Rahul	
2018	Laal Ishq	Aditya	Episode 46: "Mayajal"
2019	Krishna Chali London	Dr. Ayaan Kapoor	
2019	Paramavatar Shri Krishna	Arjun	
2019, 2020	Naagin 4	Rajat	
2020	Maddam Sir	Kabir	
2021	Ghar Ek Mandir - Kripa Agrasen Maharaj Ki	Siddhant Sinha / Advocate Vedant Sinha	
2022	Kabhi Kabhie Ittefaq Sey	Armaan Agrima	
2023	Swaraj	Barin Gosh	Episode 45 & 47
2023	Kundali Milan	Yash Garg	
2024	Savdhaan India – Apni Khaki	Inspector Shiva Agnihotri	

=== Special appearances ===
Year	Title	Role	Notes	Ref.
2017	Rohaya & Anwar: Kecil-Kecil Mikir Jadi Manten	Himself	Indonesian show	
2017	Jodoh Wasiat Bapak	Himself	Indonesian show	
2017; 2019	Pesbukers	Himself	Indonesian show	
2023	Wah Bhai Wah	Yash Garg		

== Filmography ==
Year	Film	Role	Language
2013	Club 60	Iqbal	Hindi
2023	Do Ajnabee	Inspector	Hindi

== See also ==
- List of Indian film actors
