= Vaidehi Nair =

Indian actress

- Born: August 17, 2006 (age 20); Bhuj, Gujarat
- Occupation: Actress
- Years active: 2016 – present
- Known for: Shrimad Ramayan

Vaidehi Nair is an Indian actress popularly known for works in Hindi films and television. She made her debut in 2017 as child artist in the film Viceroy House. She is popularly known for portraying role of Urmila in Shrimad Ramayan, Minty Sharma in Brahmarakshas 2, Jambavati in RadhaKrishn, Mansi in Tantra, Samaira Oberoi in Sirf Tum and Rohini in Shiv Shakti – Tap Tyaag Tandav.

== Filmography ==
=== Television ===
Year	Title	Role	Notes	Ref.
2018-2019	Tantra	Mansi		
2020	Brahmarakshas 2	Minty Sharma		
2020	RadhaKrishn	Jambavati		
2022	Sirf Tum	Samaira Oberoi		
2022	Raazz Mahal	Tara	Lead	
2023	Shiv Shakti – Tap Tyaag Tandav	Rohini		
2024	Do Dooni Pyaar	Kirti Kashyap		
2024 –2025	Shrimad Ramayan	Urmila		
2025	Jaadu Teri Nazar – Daayan Ka Mausam	Sandhya Pratap Singh		

== External link ==
- Vaidehi Nair at IMDb
- Vaidehi Nair on Instagram
