= Dhanusu Raasi Neyargale =

Indian film

- Theatrical release poster
- Directed by: Sanjay Bharathi
- Written by: Sanjay Bharathi
- Produced by: Gokulam Gopalan
- Starring: Harish Kalyan; Digangana Suryavanshi; Reba Monica John
- Cinematography: PK Varma
- Edited by: Kubendran
- Music by: Ghibran
- Production company: Sree Gokulam Movies
- Release date: 6 December 2019
- Running time: 120 minutes
- Country: India
- Language: Tamil

Dhanusu Raasi Neyargale (transl. Dear Sagittarius viewers) is a 2019 Tamil-language romantic comedy film written and directed by Sanjay Bharathi and produced by Gokulam Gopalan. The film stars Harish Kalyan, Digangana Suryavanshi (in her Tamil debut), and Reba Monica John in the lead roles. The music was composed by Ghibran with cinematography by PK Varma and editing by Kubendran. The film released on 6 December 2019.

== Plot ==
Arjun is an ardent believer of astrology. His astrology guru Thirumandha tells him that he should marry a Kanni Raasi (Virgo) girl who comes from another state so that his life will prosper. Despite the repeated matrimonial search, Arjun is unable to find his dream girl. Arjun meets K. R. Vijaya (KRV) in his ex-lover's wedding in Bangalore. They end up sleeping together. Anita advises Arjun not to follow KRV as she is an independent aspiring astronaut who is going to Mars on a one-way mission. Later, KRV comes to Chennai for a seminar and ends up staying with Arjun. They gradually fall in love. KRV breaks up with him because he is insistent on following astrology and she is insistent on following astronomy. An ensuing drama follows. Arjun realises that believing astrology is not wrong, but believing only in astrology is a mistake. He ends up engaged to Bhargavi, who is later shown to be an ardent believer in astrology.

== Cast ==
- Harish Kalyan as Arjun
- Digangana Suryavanshi as K. R. Vijaya (KRV)
- Reba Monica John as Anita
- Yogi Babu as himself
- Pandiarajan as Astrologer Thirumanandha
- Ramdoss as Karuppasamy
- Renuka as Pandiamma, Arjun’s mother
- Charle as Ramasamy
- Ashvin Raja as Joseph
- TSK as Vijay
- Haritha as Haasini
- Daniel Annie Pope as Phillips
- Samyuktha Shanmuganathan as Arjun's Boss
- Pradeep K. Vijayan as Madhavan Nair
- Vijaya Patti as Pandiamma's aunt
- Masoom Shankar as Shwetha
- Sangili Murugan as Arjun's grandfather
- Abhishek Joseph George as Richard
- Prithivee Rajesh as Arjun's date
- Mayilsamy as Chinnakaalai
- Raiza Wilson as Bhargavi (Baggy) (cameo appearance)
- Sanjay Bharathi in a guest appearance

== Production ==
Sanjay Bharathi, son of director Santhana Bharathi, made his directorial debut with this film. He had narrated the story to his friend Harish Kalyan a few years ago and included him as part of the final cast. Rhea Chakraborty initially signed on as the lead actress but later left, citing schedule clashes. She was replaced by Digangana Suryavanshi.

== Soundtrack ==
The soundtrack was composed by Ghibran. The first single, "I Want a Girl", was sung by Anirudh Ravichander and was released on 7 November 2019.

Dhanusu Raasi Neyargale

Soundtrack album by M. Ghibran
- Released: 2019
- Length: 17:07
- Language: Tamil
- Label: Sony Music India
- Producer: M. Ghibran

M. Ghibran chronology
Petromax (2019)	Dhanusu Raasi Neyargale (2019)	Ka Pae Ranasingam (2020)

Track listing
No.	Title	Lyrics	Singers	Length
1.	"I Want a Girl"	Ku. Karthik	Anirudh Ravichander	3:17
2.	"Neethan Venumadi"	Vignesh Shivan	Sarath Santosh, Rajan Chelliah	3:49
3.	"Yaaru Mela"	Madhan Karky	Sowmya Mahadevan, Lijisha Praveen	3:53
4.	"Come Back"	Chandru	Gold Devaraj	2:02
5.	"Murada Murada"	Viveka	Bombay Jayashri	4:06
Total length:				17:07

== Release and reception ==
The film had its theatrical release on 6 December 2019. Sify called the film outdated. M Suganth of The Times of India gave 2.5/5 stars and wrote "The writing is largely uneven relying more on broad comedy rather than organic humour and drama, with overstretched scenes." Pradeep Kumar of The Hindu wrote "The film lacks sensible writing, and is a misstep in an era where Tamil cinema is looking to take two steps forward in its pursuit of delivering quality content." S. Subhakeerthana of The Indian Express gave 1.5/5 stars and wrote "Where’s the plot? And, this distasteful film needed a director who knew his job." Ashameera Aiyappan of Cinema Express gave 1.5/5 stars and wrote "It would have been easier to judge Harish Kalyan's Dhanusu Raasi Neyargale had it been consistent with its problematic idead but it does redeem itself, a teeny tiny bit, towards the end."
