= Aggar Tum Na Hote =

- Genre: Drama
- Directed by: Khalid Akhtar, Bhupesh Kumar
- Starring: Simaran Kaur; Himanshu Soni
- Opening theme: Aggar Tum Na Hote
- Composer: Palak Muchhal
- Country of origin: India
- Original language: Hindi
- No. of seasons: 1
- No. of episodes: 123

Production
- Producer: Mahesh Pandey
- Camera setup: Multi-camera
- Running time: 22 minutes
- Production company: Mahesh Pandey Productions

Original release
- Network: Zee TV
- Release: 9 November 2021 – 29 April 2022

Aggar Tum Na Hote (transl. If You Were Not There) is an Indian television drama series that premiered from 9 November 2021 on Zee TV. Produced by Mahesh Pandey under Mahesh Pandey Productions, it stars Simaran Kaur and Himanshu Soni. It went off air on 29 April 2022 and digitally available on ZEE5.

Niyati a nurse resides in Mumbai with her parents and works as a nurse with Dr. Anand her childhood friend. While Abhimanyu a helpful man stays away from his mother but misses her a lot.

== Cast ==
- Himanshu Soni as Abhimanyu Pandey
- Simaran Kaur as Niyati Abhimanyu Pandey
- Amreen Malhotra as Nitya Mishra
- Riya Soni as Shagun
- Avinash Wadhawan as Gajendra Pandey
- Anita Kulkarni as Manorama Gajendra Pandey
- Vikrant Singh Rajput as Karan
- Sangeeta Adhikari as Devi Mami
- Nikhil Chaddha as Angad Tiwari
- Harsh Vashisht as Bhagwati Tiwari
- Krishnakant Singh Bundela as Panditji

== Production ==
The series was announced in 2021 by Zee TV. The teaser of the series was released on 16 October 2021. Simaran Kaur was cast in the titular role, and was joined by Himanshu Soni as leads. The series marks comeback for Avinash Wadhawan into fiction after three years. On 29 March 2022, the show has completed 100 episodes. In March 2022, Amreen Malhotra was cast to portray Nitya Mishra and joined by Reyaansh Vir Chadha to portray the negative lead Angad. The title song is sung by Palak Muchhal.

== See also ==
- List of programmes broadcast by Zee TV
