= Netrikkan =

- Theatrical release poster
- Directed by: S. P. Muthuraman
- Screenplay by: K. Balachander
- Story by: Visu
- Produced by: Rajam Balachander
- Starring: Rajinikanth; Lakshmi; Saritha; Menaka; Vijayashanti
- Cinematography: Babu
- Edited by: R. Vittal
- Music by: Ilaiyaraaja
- Production company: Kavithalayaa Productions
- Release date: 15 August 1981
- Running time: 149 minutes
- Country: India
- Language: Tamil

Netrikkan (transl. The Third Eye) is a 1981 Indian Tamil-language drama film directed by S. P. Muthuraman and produced by Kavithalayaa Productions. The film stars Rajinikanth in a double role as father and son with Saritha and Menaka, while Goundamani, Lakshmi and Sarath Babu play supporting roles. It revolves around Chakravarthy, a middle-aged businessman and womaniser who rapes a woman Radha. The rest of the film revolves around Chakravarthy's son and Radha teaching him a lesson.

The film's story and dialogues were written by Visu and the screenplay was written by K. Balachander. Babu and R. Vittal handled cinematography and editing respectively. The soundtrack and score were composed by Ilayaraja while the lyrics for the tracks were written by Kannadasan.

Netrikkan was released on 15 August 1981 and became successful at the box office. The film received critical acclaim with Rajinikanth's performance as a middle-aged womaniser being widely praised. The film was remade in Telugu as Ahankari (1992) and unofficially in Hindi as Rangeela Raja (2019).

== Plot ==
Chakravarthy, a successful textile businessman in Coimbatore, is a womaniser. Meenakshi is his wife, Santosh his son, and Sangeetha his daughter. It does not take long for Santosh to learn of his father's behaviour and he tries to mend his ways. Radha gets introduced as a candidate for the PRO (Public Relations Officer) vacancy and eventually gets selected and is sent to Hong Kong for training. Chakravarthy, unable to tolerate his son's growing menace, sets off to Hong Kong for a holiday. Here he meets Radha and at one point rapes her. Chakravarthy flies back to India where he is met with a number of changes which all point out to the new general manager. This person turns out to be Radha who has joined with Santosh to teach Chakravarthy a lesson for life. How the duo succeeds in changing Chakravarthy's behaviour forms the crux of the story.

== Cast ==
- Rajinikanth in a dual role as:
  - Chakravarthy
  - Santhosh
- Lakshmi as Meenakshi
- Saritha as Radha
- Menaka as Menaka
- Vijayashanti as Sangeetha
- Goundamani as Singaram
- Sarath Babu as Yuvaraja (guest appearance)
- Thengai Srinivasan (guest appearance)
- Neelu as a doctor

== Production ==
Netrikann is the inaugural production of K. Balachander's Kavithalayaa Productions. It had Rajinikanth playing the roles of father and son. Unlike other Tamil films where the father's character is portrayed as a clean person and the son has vices, in this film it is the opposite. Balachander produced the film as he felt that the concept had a lot of scope for Rajinikanth to perform. Muthuraman was initially hesitant to direct the film but Balachander encouraged him to do so. Cameraman Babu introduced the mask shots through this film, the film had 90 mask shots.

== Soundtrack ==
The soundtrack was composed by Ilaiyaraaja, with lyrics by Kannadasan.

Track listing
No.	Title	Singer(s)	Length
1.	"Raja Rani"	Malaysia Vasudevan, S. P. Sailaja	4:09
2.	"Theeratha"	S. P. Balasubrahmanyam	4:13
3.	"Ramanin Mohanam"	K. J. Yesudas, S. Janaki	4:13
4.	"Mappillaikku"	Malaysia Vasudevan, P. Susheela	4:15
Total length:			16:50

== Release and reception ==
Netrikkan was released on 15 August 1981. Sindhu-Jeeva of Kalki criticised the film for boring visuals, overdose of glamour dance, unintelligible dialogues, lengthy climax chase but praised Rajinikanth's acting and Chalam's art direction. In 1999, the film was screened at a 12-day film festival celebrating Rajinikanth's 25th year in cinema.

== Bibliography ==
- Ramachandran, Naman (2014) [2012]. Rajinikanth: The Definitive Biography. New Delhi: Penguin Books. ISBN 978-0-14-342111-5.
