= Saumya Saraswat =

Indian actress, dancer and model

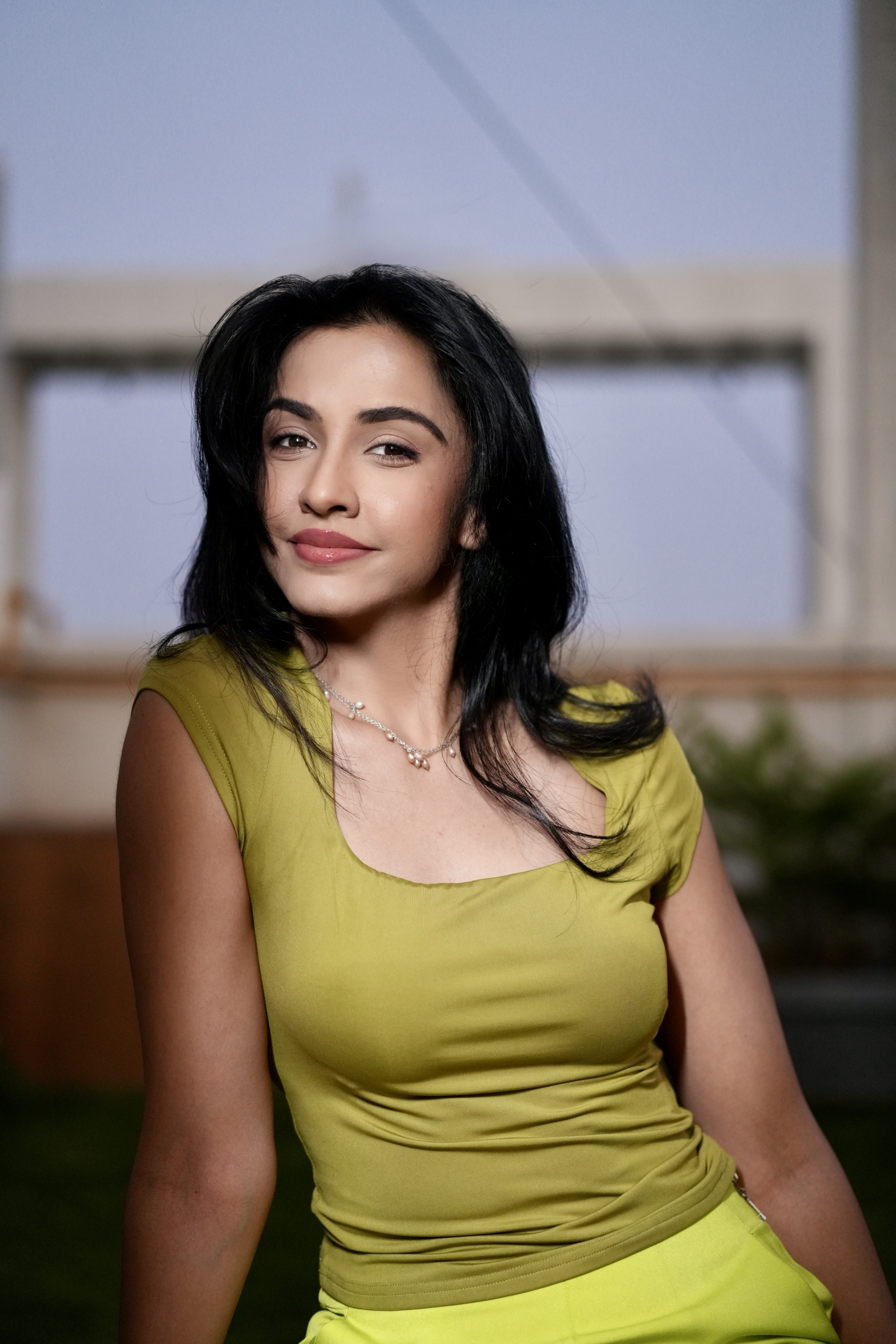
- Saumya in 2026
- Born: November 26, 1999 (age 26); Jaipur, Rajasthan, India
- Occupation: Actress
- Years active: 2020–present
- Known for: Imlie; Pishachini

Saumya Saraswat (born 26 November, 1999) is an Indian actress, dancer and model who primarily works in Hindi television.

== Early life and career ==
Saumya began her artistic journey as a dancer and choreographer. She trained rigorously in dance and was part of the Vaibhavi Merchant dance group, performing as a background dancer in various film songs. She also choreographed stage acts.

Saumya made her television debut with the supernatural thriller Pishachini on Colors TV, portraying the role of Nikita Rajput. She gained further recognition for her role as Keya, a grey-shaded character, in Star Plus's daily soap Imlie. In 2024, she was cast as Geet in Ekta Kapoor's show Chahenge Tumhe Itna, describing it as a "golden opportunity" to work with Balaji Telefilms.

== Personal life ==
She has openly discussed her struggles during her early days in Mumbai.

== Filmography ==
=== Television ===
Year	Title	Role	Ref.
2022–2023	Imlie	Keya Rana	
2022–2023	Pishachini	Nikita Rajput	
2024	Chahenge Tumhe Itna	Geet	
2024	Mehndi Wala Ghar	Sheila	
2024–2025	C.I.D.	Sub Inspector Avni	
