= Bhagonwali – Baante Apni Taqdeer =

- Genre: Drama
- Directed by: K. Mohit Kumar Jha; Bharat Bhatiya; Ranjan Kumar Singh; Jafar Shaikh; Vicky Chauhan; Arvind Gupta
- Starring: See below
- Opening theme: "Bhagonwali"
- Country of origin: India
- Original language: Hindi
- No. of seasons: 1
- No. of episodes: 318

Production
- Camera setup: Multi-camera
- Running time: 24 minutes
- Production company: Samidha Khalid's Creative Lab

Original release
- Network: Zee TV
- Release: 6 December 2010 – 17 February 2012

Bhagonwali is an Indian daily soap opera that aired on Zee TV. The series premiered on 6 December 2010. It is produced by Samidha Khalid's Creative Lab. It tells the story of Runjhun who brings good luck and fortune wherever she goes. However, her own life is riddled with misfortune and hard work because of her circumstances. This show went off air on 17 February 2012, ending with a total of 318 episodes. The show was replaced by Punar Vivaah.

== Plot ==
The story is set in Kannauj, Uttar Pradesh. Runjhun, an orphan, lives with her uncles and aunts and is treated like a servant in the house. However, Runjhun remains cheerful and ready to do any work. Her maternal grandmother tries to shield her after she learns that Runjhun is a bhagonwali (the lucky one) who will bring good luck and prosperity wherever she goes. Runjhun's aunts plot against her and get her married to a local goon Guddu Shukla who agrees to live with them. Runjhun throws Guddu a challenge that she will turn him into a good husband and human being.

Guddu decides to teach Runjhun's evil relatives a lesson but she feels bad for them and tries to help them. This upsets Guddu who tries to convince her that they deserve it. Guddu and Runjhun's relationship worsens when his ex-girlfriend, Nilu, enters their lives. She has Runjhun abducted. She forces Guddu to marry her if he wants to know where Runjhun is being held. Guddu marries Nilu though Runjhun escapes but before she can stop the wedding, she is shot by Jhabbu. When Nilu takes Guddu to where Runjhun was held, she is killed by the kidnapper who is then arrested.

Guddu finally finds Runjhun who has lost her memory. Her relatives try to deceive her. She is overcome with maternal feelings and wants a child and so asks Guddu to marry her. Not wanting to take advantage of her memory loss, he initially refuses but finally agrees. As they marry, Runjhun begins to remember. Her relatives finally accept her and the family is reunited in a happy ending.

== Cast ==
The following is a list of the cast members and the characters they play on the television show:

- Nivedita Tiwari as Runjhun Guddu Shukla
- Himmanshoo A. Malhotra as Guddu Shukla
- Rita Bhaduri as Ahilya Devi / Runjhun's Nani (grandmother)
- Ankit Bathla as Abhigyan
- Vaishali Nazareth as Billo Pandey
- Sagar Saini as Rajju Pandey
- Mona Ray as Mittho Pandey
- Jyotsna Chandola as Mahadevi Pandey
- Madan Tyagi as Vishnu Pandey
- Suruchi Verma as Kalsanwali
- Jayesh Yadav as Kukkan
- Aashutosh Tiwari as Jabbu
- Supriya Kumari as Nilu
- Aakash Pandey as Khabri Tiwari
- Avdhesh Kushwaha as Bantu Pandey.

== Awards ==
Zee Rishtey Awards 2011 Favourite Mastikhor Sadasya - Guddu Shukla
