= Kundali Milan =

Indian drama television series

- Genre: Drama
- Created by: Arvind Babbal
- Written by: Dialogues; Rekha Babbal
- Screenplay by: Sanchitha Bose
- Story by: Jainesh Izardar
- Directed by: Arvind Babbal
- Creative director: Dwani D. Gangdev
- Starring: Ankit Bathla; Shubhanshi Singh; Prachi Bohra
- Composers: Paresh Shah; Suraj
- Country of origin: India
- Original language: Hindi
- No. of episodes: 114

Production
- Producers: Arvind Babbal; Rekha Babbal
- Editor: Avad Narayan Singh
- Camera setup: Multi Camera
- Running time: 23-26 minutes
- Production company: Arvind Babbal Production Private Limited

Original release
- Network: Shemaroo Umang
- Release: 29 May – 5 October 2023

Kundali Milan is an Indian Hindi-language drama television series premiered on 29 May 2023 on Shemaroo Umang Produced by Arvind Babbal under Arvind Babbal Productions, it stars Ankit Bathla, Shubhanshi Singh and Prachi Bohra.

== Plot ==
The narrative follows the story of childhood sweethearts Yash and Richa, on the verge of getting married. However, their plans are disrupted when Yash's grandfather uncovers a curse in Yash's Kundali (Horoscope): any woman who becomes Yash's first wife will die within 90 days. Richa's adopted sister, Anjali, steps in to save Richa, without knowledge of the curse in Yash's Kundali.

== Cast ==
- Shubhanshi Raghuwanshi as Anjali
- Prachi Bohra as Richa
- Bindia Kalra as Alka
- Ankit Bathla as Yash Garg
- Yajuvendra Singh as Mukesh Garg
- Ambar Bedi as Uma
- Sanjay Tiwari as Karune
- Shilpi Maheshwari as Kamini
- Giri Raj as Dada Ji
- Swarna Bharat as Rajwati
- Palak Kaur as Pallavi
- Pradeep Gagan as Subodh
- Shailly Shukla as Dadi
- Anila Kharbanda as Rajjo
- Khabir Mehta
- Gaurav Bajpai as Aditya

== Production ==
=== Casting ===
The series was announced on Shemaroo TV by Arvind Babbal Productions. Ankit Bathla, Shubhanshi Singh and Prachi Bohra were signed as the leads. The first promo was released on 12 May 2023 featuring Ankit Bathla, Shubhanshi Singh and Prachi Bohra.

=== Filming ===
Principal photography commenced from May 2023 in Mathura, Uttar Pradesh.

=== Cancellation ===
The Show Went off air Within Five Months. The last episode aired on 5 October 2023. The show ran for 114 episodes.
