= Rangeela Raja =

2019 Hindi-language comedy film

- Directed by: Sikander Bharti
- Written by: Raj Verma, Khalid Azmi
- Screenplay by: Pahlaj Nihalani
- Story by: Visu
- Based on: Netrikan by S. P. Muthuraman
- Produced by: Pahlaj Nihalani
- Starring: Govinda; Mishika Chourasia; Anupama Agnihotri; Digangana Suryavanshi
- Cinematography: Siba Mishra
- Music by: Songs: Ishwar Kumar; Score: Amar Mohile
- Production company: Chiragdeep International
- Distributed by: Chiragdeep International
- Release date: 18 January 2019
- Running time: 162 minutes
- Country: India
- Language: Hindi
- Budget: ₹19 crore ($2.4 million)
- Box office: ₹18 lakh ($23,000)

Rangeela Raja (transl. The colourful king) is a 2019 Indian Hindi-language comedy film directed by Sikander Bharti and written and produced by Pahlaj Nihalani. Starring Govinda, Mishika Chourasia and Anupama Agnihotri, the film was released on 18 January 2019. The film is a remake of Netrikan. The film received highly negative reviews from critics.

== Plot ==
Natasha, a headstrong woman, wants to explore her career. She meets Raja Vijendra Pratap Singh, a business tycoon. After meeting Natasha, Singh's life turns around, as do the lives of his family. His younger brother, Ajay Pratap Singh, leads a life of a yogi and decides to bring his elder brother back on track.

== Cast ==
- Govinda as Vijendra Pratap Singh, a philandering businessman, and Ajay Pratap Singh, a pious yogi
- Mishika Chourasia as Natasha, a strong-headed woman working with Vijendra Pratap Singh
- Shakti Kapoor as Padampat, a driver
- Prem Chopra as Guruji
- Anupama Agnihotri as Aalekha, the love interest of Ajay Pratap Singh
- Digangana Suryavanshi as Shivranjani, the wife of Vijendra Pratap Singh
- Karan Aanand as Yuvraj
- Aarti Gupta as Shikha
- Govind Namdev as Sharma
- Imran Khan as himself (special appearance)

== Soundtrack ==
Rangeela Raja

Soundtrack album by Ishwar Kumar
- Recorded: 2016–2018
- Genre: Feature film soundtrack

The film's soundtrack album, which consisted of five tracks, was composed by Ishwar Kumar. Shreya Ghoshal lend her voice to three of these tracks.

No.	Title	Lyrics	Singer(s)	Length
1.	"Rangeela Raja"	Mehboob	Benny Dayal	4:19
2.	"Jogi Dil"	Mehboob	Nakash Aziz, Sarodee Borah	3:25
3.	"Dholi Dol Baja"	Mehboob	Udit Narayan, Shreya Ghoshal, Dev Negi, Ishwar Kumar	5:00
4.	"Jagmag Jagmag"	Mehboob	Shreya Ghoshal, Mohammed Irfan	5:51
5.	"Aum Naad"	Sikandar Bharti	Shreya Ghoshal, Ishwar Kumar	4:54

== Release ==
The film was initially scheduled for release on 6 November 2018, alongside Thugs Of Hindostan. However, it was announced via the trailer released in October 2018 that the film would be released on 11 January 2019.

On 2 December 2018, the release of the film was indefinitely postponed as the Central Board of Film Certification had not yet issued a certificate for the film, which producer Nihalani appealed to the FCAT (Film Certification Appellate Tribunal). On 14 December 2018, the CBFC finally cleared the film with only three cuts, instead of the original 20, and gave their approval to Nihalani to release the film by its 11 January date.

Producer and screenwriter Pahlaj Nihalani criticized the Centre Board of Film Certification (CBFC) for not reviewing the film within 40 days of submission. The film was screened by the CBFC just two weeks ahead of its release, and the producer was asked to make 20 cuts. Nihalani accused the CBFC chairperson, Prasoon Joshi, of favoritism, saying that preferential treatment was extended to big studios. Nihalani, an ex-chairperson of CBFC, vowed to take the CBFC the Bombay High Court over its decision.

== Reception ==
=== Critical response ===
Writing for Hindustan Times, Raja Sen articulated: "For the love of Govinda, don't watch this film. Zero star. Even Govinda's patented pelvic thrusts were harmless. He was never a toxic masculine threat, no vulgarian, merely a graceful clown. Nihalani, I'm sad to report, plumbs the depths to snatch this innocence from the actor. He assaults us with images of a sickening Govinda, a performance-enhancing rapist who laughs in the face of consequences. I emerged from this film traumatised. To paraphrase a Govinda hit: ‘Ankhiyon ko goli mare.’ I want to blow my eyes out".
