= Meri Doli Mere Angana =

Indian Hindi language television soap opera

- Genre: Soap opera
- Created by: Lalsahab Yadav; Roshan Roy
- Screenplay by: Sameer. L. Garud
- Story by: Vijender Gupta; Archana Damohe (dialogue)
- Directed by: Ajith Kumar; Mahesh Thagde
- Creative director: Raj Patil
- Starring: Aastha Abhay; Ankit Raizada
- Theme music composer: Lalit Sen
- Opening theme: "Meri Doli Mere Angana"
- Composer: Lalit Sen
- Country of origin: India
- Original language: Hindi
- No. of seasons: 1
- No. of episodes: 119

Production
- Producers: Vijender Gupta; Mahesh Thagde
- Editors: Shashank Singh; Rakesh Das
- Camera setup: Multi-camera
- Running time: 20–25 minutes
- Production company: Tell-A-Tale Media

Original release
- Network: Azaad TV
- Release: 14 September 2021 – 29 January 2022

Meri Doli Mere Angana (transl. My Palanquin In My House) is an Indian Hindi soap opera starring Astha Abhay and Ankit Raizada. It premiered on Azaad TV on 14 September 2021. It is made under the banner of Tell-A-Tale Media. This show is also available on MX Player.

== Plot ==
In Bithoor, the entire Singh family, especially her father, considers the daughter an apple of their eye. But these relationships change and it drastically affects Janki.

== Cast ==
- Aastha Abhay as Janki Singh
- Surendra Pal as Gyanendra Singh: Janki's father
- Dhrisha Kalyani as Sakshi Singh: Janki's sister
- Worship Khanna as Vijayendra Singh: Janki's cousin brother
- Dharmendra Gupta as Nagendra Singh: Janki's uncle
- Archana Damohe as Janki's grandmother
- Kuldeep Chaudhary as Santosh: Vijayendra's friend
- Ankit Raizada
- Dipali Sharma as Ginni
- Kimmy Kaur as Madhu Bua
- Priyanka Malviya as Nidhi
