= FryDay =

2018 Indian film by Abhishek Dogra

- Theatrical release poster
- Directed by: Abhishek Dogra
- Screenplay by: Rajeev Kaul; Manurishi Chadha
- Story by: Rajeev Kaul
- Produced by: Sajid Qureshi; Mahipal Karan Rathore; Salaunddin Yousuf
- Starring: Govinda; Varun Sharma; Digangana Suryavanshi
- Cinematography: Manoj Shaw
- Edited by: Manan Ajay Sagar
- Music by: Ankit Tiwari; Millind Gaba; Rooshin – Kaizad; Gunwant Sen
- Production company: Inbox Pictures
- Distributed by: PVR Pictures
- Release date: 12 October 2018
- Country: India
- Language: Hindi
- Box office: est. ₹15.2 million

FryDay is a 2018 Indian comedy-drama film directed by Abhishek Dogra. Sajid Qureshi and ⠀⠀PVR Pictures produce it and stars Govinda, Varun Sharma, Prabhleen Sandhu and Digangana Suryavanshi in lead roles. The film was scheduled to be released on 11 May 2018. It was released on 12 October 2018.

== Plot ==
Rajeev is a salesman who works for Pavitra Paani Purifiers. He had been unable to sell any water purifiers for several days. So his boss gave him one last chance. Rajeev went to a restaurant owned by a friend and told him that Gagan's wife needed a water purifier. Gagan is a stage actor, and his wife works for an NGO. She goes to Shimla for a few days. Gagan calls a girl, who arrives at his home. Suddenly, Gagan finds a thief in his house. The thief blackmails him because Gagan was having an affair. Rajeev then calls Gagan's wife, who tells him that her husband will be at her house. Rajeev goes to the house, mistakes the girl for Gagan's wife, and a series of comical incidents ensues.

== Cast ==
- Govinda as Gagan Kapoor
- Prabhleen Sandhu as Bela Kapoor
- Varun Sharma as Rajiv Chabbra
- Sanjay Mishra as Manchanda
- Brijendra Kala as Thief
- Rajesh Sharma as Inspector Ranpal, Bindu's husband
- Digangana Suryavanshi as Bindu Ranpal (Gagan's love interest) / Fake Bindu Rajiv Chabbra
- Atul Mathur as the Play Actor
- Natasha Stankovic (Item number "Jimmy Choo")

== Soundtrack ==
FryDay

Soundtrack album by Ankit Tiwari, Millind Gaba, Rooshin – Kaizad and Gunwant Sen
- Genre: Feature film soundtrack
- Length: 8:50
- Language: Hindi
- Label: T-Series

Ankit Tiwari chronology
Aiyaary (2018)	FryDay (2018)	Kaashi in Search of Ganga (2018)

Millind Gaba chronology
Housefull 3 (2016)	Bachelor Party (2012)

The album is composed by Ankit Tiwari, Millind Gaba, Rooshin – Kaizad and Gunwant Sen while the lyrics penned by Anurag Bhomia, Roosh and Sajid Qureshi.

Track listing
No.	Title	Lyrics	Music	Singer(s)	Length
1.	"Chotey Bade"	Anurag Bhomia	Ankit Tiwari	Ankit Tiwari, Mika Singh	3:10
2.	"Jimmy Choo"	Rossh	Millind Gaba	Priyanka Goyat	2:45
3.	"Kauva Party"	Sajid Qureshi	Gunwant Sen	Navraj Hans	2:55
Total length:					8:50

== Reception ==
Bollywood Hungama said the film "is a decent funny entertainer that works despite glitches", while Movie Koop said, "Don't waste your time in this one, it will give you nightmares if you are planning to watch it."
