= Do Ajnabee =

2023 Indian Hindi-language film

- Directed by: Sanjeev Kumar Rajput
- Screenplay by: Sanjeev Kumar Rajput
- Produced by: Anu Mitra; Suraj Sharma; Mayank Shekhar
- Starring: Aarya Babbar; Ankit Bathla
- Cinematography: Santosh Pal; Dilip Pal
- Edited by: Bhautik Nandha
- Music by: Deepak Gupta
- Production companies: Blockbuster Films & Entertainment; PK Entertainment
- Release date: 24 November 2023
- Country: India
- Language: Hindi

Do Ajnabee is Indian Hindi-language film, written and directed by Sanjeev Kumar Rajput. The film stars Aarya Babbar, Ankit Bathla and Aman Yatan Verma.

== Plot ==
In the film, a company employee faces a moral dilemma when he unintentionally causes the death of a colleague who had a groundbreaking car design. The incident occurs as he seeks funds for his ailing brother's medical treatment. The narrative takes a compelling twist with the introduction of a female lead seeking retribution for her boyfriend's demise, leading to intricate and gripping dynamics among the characters.

== Cast ==
- Aarya Babbar
- Ankit Bathla
- Aman Yatan Verma
- Anu Mitra
- Sunny Thakur

== Filming ==
The film is mostly shot in Nainital, Uttarakhand, Mumbai, Maharashtra, India.

== Soundtrack ==
Do Ajnabee

Soundtrack album by Deepak Gupta
- Released: 30 October 2023
- Recorded: 2022–2023
- Genre: Feature film soundtrack
- Length: 8:30
- Language: Hindi
- Label: Red Ribbon Musik
External audio
- Video on YouTube

The music of the film is composed by Deepak Gupta and sung by singers including Yasser Desai, Palak Muchhal and others.

| No. | Title | Lyrics | Music | Singer(s) | Length |
|---|---|---|---|---|---|
| 1. | "Janam" | Deepak Gupta | Deepak Gupta | Yasser Desai | 04:18 |
| 2. | "Pakeezah" | Deepak Gupta | Deepak Gupta | Palak Muchhal | 04:12 |
| Total length: | | | | | 8:30 |
