= Raazz Mahal =

Indian supernatural television series

- Also known as: Raazz Mahal - Dakini Ka Rahasya
- Genre: Drama; Fantasy
- Starring: Himanshu Soni; Neha Harsora; Ridheema Tiwari
- Country of origin: India
- Original language: Hindi
- No. of seasons: 1
- No. of episodes: 156

Production
- Producer: Rashmi Sharma
- Running time: 22 minutes
- Production company: Rashmi Sharma Telefilms

Original release
- Network: Shemaroo Umang
- Release: 28 November 2022 – 27 May 2023

Raazz Mahal (transl. Royal Palace - Mystery Of Demon) is an Indian Hindi-language fantasy drama television series premiered on 28 November 2022 on Shemaroo Umang. Produced by Rashmi Sharma under the banner of Rashmi Sharma Telefilms, it stars Himanshu Soni, Neha Harsora and Ridheema Tiwari. It ended on 27 May 2023.

== Cast ==
- Himanshu Soni as Adhiraj: Sunaina's husband (2022–2023) (Dead)
- Neha Harsora as Sunaina: Adhiraj's wife; Tara's elder sister (2022–2023) (Dead)
- Ridheema Tiwari as Chandralekha
- Vaidehi Nair / Ayesha Kapoor as Tara: Sunaina's younger sister (2022–2023) / (2023)
- Preeti Puri as Adhiraj's mother (2022–2023)
- Aarav Chowdhary as Adhiraj's father (2022) (Dead)
- Arina Dey as Mandakini: Chandralekha's friend; Kanak's mother
- Himani Sharma as Kanak: Mandakini's daughter
- Micky Dudani as Vansh
- Kamya Panjabi as Mantealekha: Chandralekha's elder sister; Swaraj's mother (2023)
- Patrali Chattopadhyay
- Meenakshi Chugh as Pari
- Aashish Dral as Swaraj

== Production ==
=== Casting ===
Himanshu Soni as Adhiraj, and Neha Harsora as Sunaina were signed in the lead roles. Ridheema Tiwari was cast to portray the negative lead.

=== Development ===
The series was announcement by Rashmi Sharma Telefilms for Shemaroo Entertainment. The shooting of the series began in November 2022, mainly shot at the Film City, Mumbai. The promos were released in November 2022. It premiered on 28 November 2022 on Shemaroo Umang.
