= Ridheema Tiwari =

Indian television actress (born 1984)

Ridhiema Tiwari
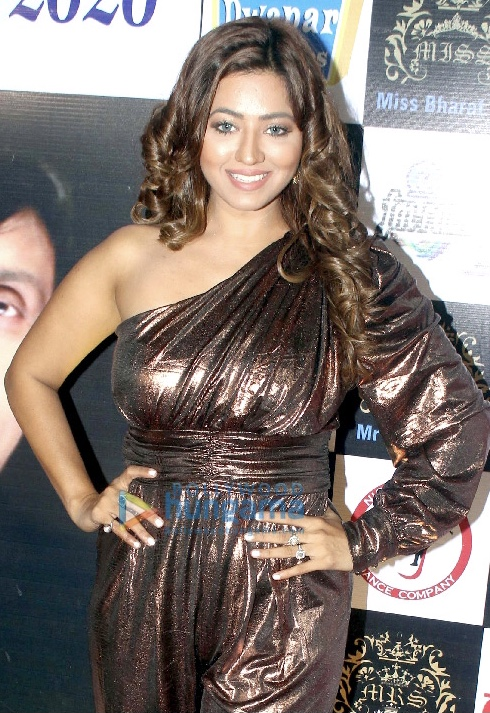
- Tiwari in 2020
- Born: 31 August 1984 (age 41); Gwalior, Madhya Pradesh, India
- Occupation: Actor
- Years active: 2007–present
- Spouse: Jaskaran Singh

Ridheema Tiwari is an Indian actress who mainly works in Hindi television. She is known for her roles of Rasika in Do Dil Ek Jaan, Disha in Sasural Genda Phool, and Maldawali in Life OK's Series Ghulaam. She is also known for her Bollywood Debut in 2017 for film Begum Jaan.

== Filmography ==
=== Television ===
| Year | Show | Role | Notes | Ref(s) |
|---|---|---|---|---|
| 2007 | Ssshhhh...Phir Koi Hai Ek Bhoot Ek Wakil Ek Shaitan | Trisha | Episode 53 | |
| 2007–2008 | Har Ghar Kuch Kehta Hai | Shalini Prem Thakral | | |
| 2008 | Dill Mill Gayye | Mehak | Cameo role | |
| 2009 | Aashiq Biwi Ka | Neeta | | |
| 2009–2011 | Woh Rehne Waali Mehlon Ki | Ayesha Johri | | |
| 2010–2011 | Rishton Se Badi Pratha | Ratna Ranvijay Singh | | |
| 2011–2012 | Sasural Genda Phool | Disha Ilesh Bharadwaj | | |
| 2012–2013 | Love Marriage Ya Arranged Marriage | Sandhya | | |
| 2013–2014 | Do Dil Ek Jaan | Rasika | | |
| 2014 | Crime Patrol | Deepika | | |
| 2014–2015 | Har Mushkil Ka Hal Akbar Birbal | Begum Yasmin Khan | | |
| 2014–2016 | Savdhaan India | Nisha | | |
| 2014–2016 | Savdhaan India | Shilpa | | |
| 2014–2016 | Savdhaan India | Anjali | | |
| 2014–2016 | Savdhaan India | Archana | | |
| 2014–2016 | Savdhaan India | Husna | | |
| 2014–2016 | Savdhaan India | Madhavi | | |
| 2014–2016 | Savdhaan India | Shruti | | |
| 2015 | Yeh Hai Aashiqui | Divya | | |
| 2015 | Dosti..nmarziyan | Ridheema Joshi | | |
| 2015 | SuperCops Vs SuperVillains | Kaali Pari | Episode: A Heartless Witch | |
| 2016 | Agent Raghav - Crime Branch | Manasvi | | |
| 2017 | The Kapil Sharma Show | Guest | Special appearance | |
| 2017 | Ghulaam | Maldawali | | |
| 2019–2020 | Divya Drishti | Ojaswini Shergill | | |
| 2021–2022 | Sasural Genda Phool 2 | Disha Ilesh Bharadwaj | | |
| 2022–2023 | Raazz Mahal – Dakini Ka Rahasya | Chandralekha | | |

=== Films ===
| Year | Films | Role | Ref |
|---|---|---|---|
| 2010 | Gudu Gudu Gunjam | Rithima | |
| 2017 | Begum Jaan | Amba | |

=== Music video ===
| Year | Song | Singer | Ref |
|---|---|---|---|
| 2020 | Harega Nahi India | Gaurav Sharma | |
