= Khap (film) =

2011 film

- Theatrical poster
- Directed by: Ajai Sinha
- Written by: Ashok Lal (script); Vinod Ranganathan (script); Ishaan Trivedi (dialogues); Vijay Verma (dialogues)
- Story by: Ajai Sinha
- Produced by: Sangita Sinha; Siddhant Sinha
- Starring: Yuvika Chaudhary; Om Puri; Govind Namdev
- Cinematography: Lokesh Bhalla
- Edited by: Sanjay Sankla
- Music by: Annujj Kappoo
- Production companies: Ananda Film & Telecommunications
- Release dates: 29 July 2011 (India); 23 September 2011 (Canada)
- Running time: 125 minutes
- Country: India
- Language: Hindi

Khap is a 2011 Hindi film starring Yuvika Chaudhary, Om Puri, Govind Namdev, Manoj Pahwa, and Mohnish Bahl. Directed by Ajai Sinha, the film is a socio-political drama based on the Manoj-Babli honour killing case and Khap Panchayats in villages of Haryana, Rajasthan, and Uttar Pradesh, which order honour killing to prevent marriages within the same gotra.

== Plot ==
Madhur Chaudhary (played by Mohnish Bahl) moves out of his rural home, leaving his father alone after various disputes they have. Madhur re-locates to Delhi along with his wife, Komal, and daughter, Ria (played by Yuvika Chaudhary). Sixteen years later, Ria is now in college, while Madhur is an investigator with the Human Rights Department.

Madhur is asked to investigate a case in his village of alleged suicide of a couple, Veer and Surili. The locals, including the fathers of the couple, Daulat Singh and Sukhiram, respectively, admit that the couple had killed themselves. After going in depth in his investigation, Madhur finds out that the deaths are one of many that have taken place in a region that is still bound by the Khap Panchayat. It dictates that couples cannot marry distant relatives, nor can they have an inter-caste/inter-religious marriage. As he delves further into this issue, he ends up being attacked, is hospitalized, and then subsequently dies. Komal and Ria move in with Madhur's father, Omkar Singh Chaudhary (played by Om Puri), and eventually settle down in the village.

Omkar finds out that Ria is in love with fellow-collegian, Kush (played by Sarrtaj Gill), the son of South Africa-based Jagmohan and Saroj Mitter, and arranges their marriage. After the couple returns from their honeymoon, they find themselves locked in the same inhumane customs.

== Cast ==
- Yuvika Chaudhary as Ria Bhaduri
- Om Puri as Omkar Singh Chaudhary
- Govind Namdev as Daulat Singh
- Manoj Pahwa as Sukhiram
- Mohnish Bahl as Madhur Chaudhary
- Sarrtaj Gill as Kush J. Mitter
- Alok Nath as Professor
- Anuradha Patel as Komal Sharma
- Shammi as Masterni
- Nivedita Tiwari as Surili

== Soundtrack ==
- "Aaina Dekha" - Shaan
- "Deewangi" - Shaan, Shreya Ghoshal
- "Is Pyaar Ko Jadugari" - Shaan
- "Har Ek Burai" - Vikas
- "Ishq Ro Raha Hai" - Rekha Bhardwaj
- "Shri Ram Jai Ram" - Gazi Khan Barna
- "Tumse Bichhad Kar" - Jagjit Singh
- "Yeh Wohi To Hai" - Shaan, Shreya Ghoshal
- "Yeh Pyaar Kaise Kab Ho Jaaye" - Shaan, Shreya Ghoshal
- "Yeh Pyaar Kaise Kab Ho Jaaye (extended)" - Shaan, Shreya Ghoshal

== See also ==
- Khap
