= Himanshu Soni =

Indian television actor (born 1988)

- Born: 1 February 1988 (age 38); Jaipur, Rajasthan, India
- Occupation: Actor
- Years active: 2013–present

Himanshu Soni (born 1 February 1988 in Jaipur, Rajasthan, India, is an Indian actor. He is best known for his portrayals of the Buddha in Buddha – Rajaon Ka Raja, Shiv, Shivaye in Neeli Chatri Waale, Krishna in Radhakrishn, Rama, Vishnu in Ram Siya Ke Luv Kush and Veer Hanuman.

== Television ==
Year	Title	Role	Ref.
2012–2013	Ramayan	Vishnu	
2013–2014	Buddha – Rajaon Ka Raja	The Buddha	
2014–2016	Neeli Chatri Waale	Shiva	
2018	RadhaKrishn	Krishna	
2019–2020	Ram Siya Ke Luv Kush	Rama	
2019–2020	Jag Janani Maa Vaishno Devi – Kahani Mata Rani Ki	Rama	
2021–2022	Aggar Tum Na Hote	Abhimanyu Pandey	
2022–2023	Raazz Mahal – Dakini Ka Rahasya	Adhiraj	
2023–2024	Kyunki Saas Maa Bahu Beti Hoti Hai	Kabir Yadav	
2025	Veer Hanuman	Vishnu	
2026–present	Jagadhatri	ACP Shaurya Rathee	
