= Shaily Priya Pandey =

Indian actress

- Born: Patna, Bihar
- Occupation: Actress
- Years active: 2016-present
- Known for: Kismat Ki Lakiro Se, Jag Janani Maa Vaishno Devi – Kahani Mata Rani Ki

Shaily Priya Pandey is an Indian television actress. She is primarily known for her roles such as Shraddha in Kismat Ki Lakiro Se, as Pavitra in Pavitra: Bharose Ka Safar, as Bharti in Jag Janani Maa Vaishno Devi - Kahani Mata Rani Ki and as Nidhi Tripathi in Aap Ke Aa Jane Se.

== Early life ==
Shaily was born in Patna, Bihar. She graduated from Ramjas College. She also studied performing arts at Shri Ram Centre, Mandi House, where she was actively involved in theatre.

== Career ==
Shaily made her first appearance in 2016 with Queens Hain Hum. After this, she appeared in Fear Files as Prerna Sinha, and as Sarah in Aye Zindagi in 2017. In 2018, Pandey played Nidhi Tripathi in Aap Ke Aa Jane Se. After this, she acted in Jag Janani Maa Vaishno Devi - Kahani Mata Rani Ki as Bharti, as Sweety in Shaadi Ke Siyape in 2019. In 2021, Pandey appeared in Pavitra: Bharose Ka Safar as Pavitra, and in 2022, Kismat Ki Lakiro Se as Shraddha.

== Filmography ==
=== Television ===
Year	Title	Role	Notes
2016-2017	Queens Hain Hum	Janvi Seth	Debut (Lead)
2017	Aye Zindagi	Prerna Sinha	
2017	Fear Files	Sarah	
2018-2019	Aap Ke Aa Jane Se	Nidhi Tripathi	
2019	Jag Janani Maa Vaishno Devi - Kahani Mata Rani Ki	Bharti	Lead
2019	Shadi Ke Siyape	Sweety	
2021-2022	Pavitra: Bharose Ka Safar	Pavitra	Lead (Title role)
2022-2024	Kismat Ki Lakiro Se	Shraddha	Lead
2025–present	Aye Dil Jee Le Zara	Anisha	
