= Shemaroo Entertainment =

Indian media company

Shemaroo Entertainment Ltd.
- Type: Public
- Traded as: BSE: 538685; NSE: SHEMAROO
- Industry: Entertainment
- Founded: 29 October 1962; 63 years ago
- Founder: Budhichand Maroo
- Headquarters: Mumbai, India
- Products: Movies, music, home video, merchandise
- Services: Content creation, aggregation, and distribution Video-on-demand (ShemarooMe)
- Website: shemarooent.com

Shemaroo Entertainment Ltd. is an Indian content creator, aggregator and distributor, specifically in the media and entertainment industry. It was founded by Buddhichand Maroo in 1962 as a book-circulating library under the name Shemaroo. It set up India's first video rental business in 1979. The company went national after it began content distribution in 1987, became aggregators and bought rights to movies for home video.

Currently, the brand has a collection of over 3700 movie titles in multiple Indian languages and offers services to customers in over 30 countries including the US, the UK, Singapore, UAE and Australia.

== History ==
=== Early years ===
Shemaroo Entertainment is an acronym for the founders’ surnames. The library was located at Warden Road in South Mumbai. Three branches were opened soon after.

In 1987, the company forayed into content distribution via the VHS format, which was labeled Shemaroo Video Private Ltd. They also bought rights to several movies for home video and were one of the first brands involved in the distribution of video rights in India.

Shemaroo started buying cable and pay television rights in the 1990s. In 1995, the company bought an equity stake in Sony's Indian TV channel while negotiating a deal to buy films of Sony's Columbia Tristar.

=== 2000s to present ===
Shemaroo ventured into film production with movies like Kuch Meetha Ho Jaye, Omkara, Ishqiya, Dedh Ishqiya and Hunterrr. These were followed by several others in the subsequent years.

The company forayed into digital animated films with Bal Ganesh and Ghatothkach as their initial features and became the only company to release a feature every year thereafter.

In 2012, Shemaroo completed 50 years of operations. In 2018, the company unveiled a new logo and tagline ‘India Khush Hua’.

In January 2020, Shemaroo Group launched its first TV channel named Shemaroo Marathibana. It is a 24-hour FTA Marathi movie channel with the tagline 'Assal Filmi' (translated as 'Made for Entertainment'). Swapnil Joshi is its Brand Ambassador. It airs Marathi movies like Aapla Manus, Thackeray, Bhai Vyakti Ki Valli, Judgement, Cycle, Ani Dr. Kashinath Ghanekar, etc.

In 2020, Shemaroo Group also announced the launch of a new Hindi GEC Shemaroo TV.

In May 2020, a video surfaced where the comedian Surleen Kaur made a remark about Krishna, a Hindu deity, which right-leaning media houses and political parties objected to. Following the controversy, Shemaroo announced their decision to refrain from any further involvement with Surleen Kaur and Balraj Syal because they 'failed to meet their standards of public decency'. Subsequently, ISKCON lodged a complaint against Kaur and Shemaroo with the Mumbai Police for insulting the organisation and Hindus.

In 2019, the company ventured into the pre-loaded audio speaker market and introduced Bluetooth speakers loaded with devotional content. The pricing for all three existing products in store (online & offline) – Bhagavad Gita, Bhajan Vaani and Quran Majeed and is available in the market currently with leading offline and online retailers.

In 2019, Shemaroo launched 'Shemaroo Bhakti Shri Ganesha Bhajan Vaani' during Ganesh Chaturthi, and 'Shemaroo Amritbani' on the 550th birth anniversary of Shri Guru Nanak Dev Ji.

== Business operations ==
Shemaroo's content library includes over 3,700 film and non-film titles.

They also provide religious content with devotional videos, live streaming of shrines, temples, and more in categories such as Bhakti, Ibaadat and Gurbani via their apps Ibaadat and Hari Om.

Their distribution network includes an in-house television syndication team, a new media technology team for mobile value-added services (MVAS), the Internet, DTH and a nationwide home entertainment distribution network. The company has partnered with Airtel, Vodafone, Idea, MTN, Ooredoo and Etisalat to distribute content like videos, music and live streaming via MVAS. They also have an online presence on YouTube, where their channels receive an estimated 2.2 billion monthly views on average.

Their partners include major DTH platforms such as Airtel digital TV, Tata Sky and Dish TV, and TV Networks such as Sony Network, Star TV and Colors Network. The company's subsidiary Contentino Media provides in-flight entertainment for airlines like Emirates, Singapore Airlines, Qatar Airways, Air India, Vistara, Lufthansa and Virgin Atlantic.

The company's brand Yedaz is its official Bollywood licensing and merchandising rights holder that sells Bollywood-themed products like T-shirts and mugs. They've also established the Shemaroo Institute of Film and Technology (SIFT).

== ShemarooMe ==
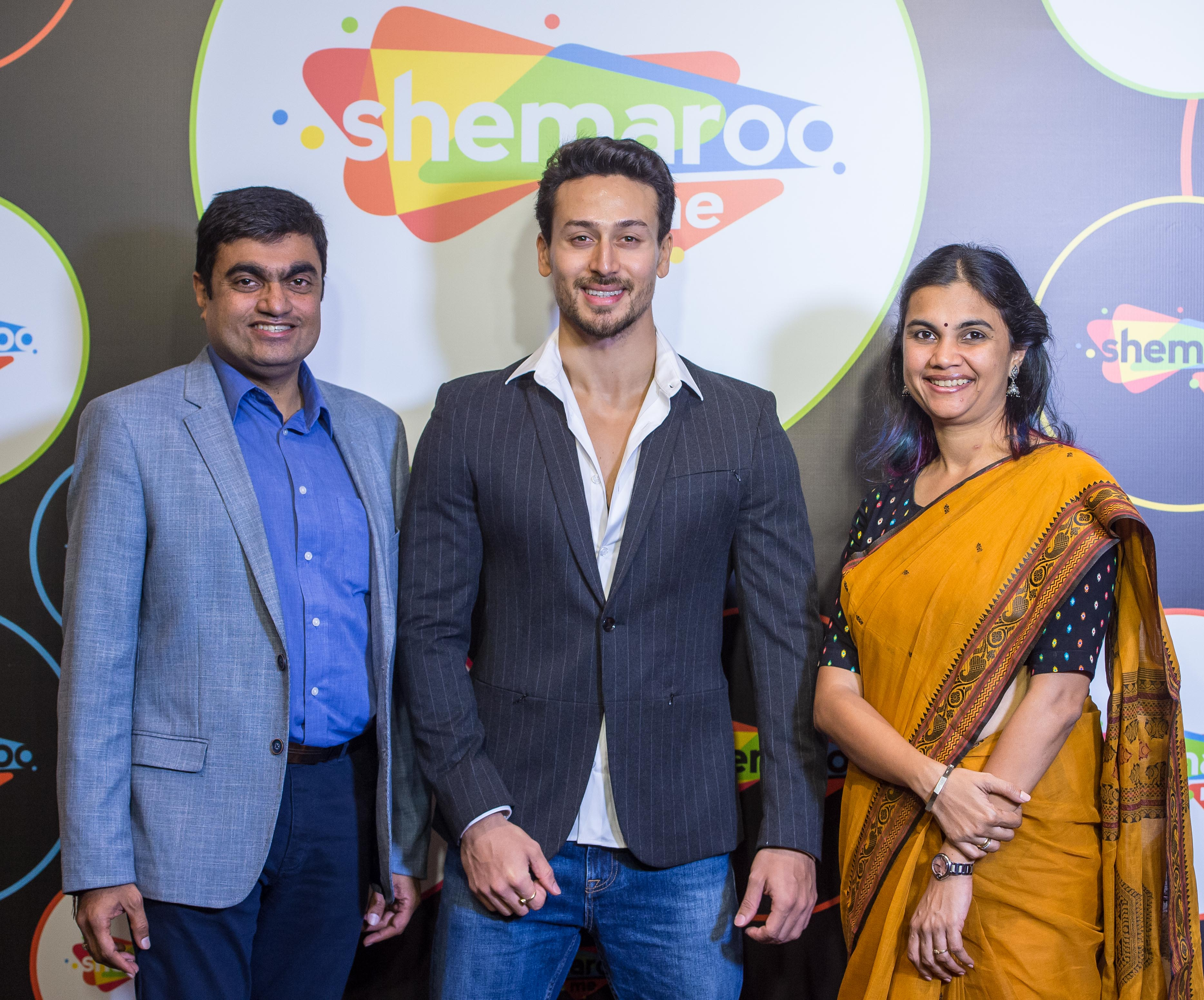
Bollywood actor Tiger Shroff was present at the launch event of the ShemarooMe app in Mumbai.

In February 2019, Shemaroo Entertainment launched its own video-on-demand service app called ShemarooMe, which is available for Android and iOS. It is also available on the web for viewers. The Bollywood actor Tiger Shroff was present at the launch event of this app in Mumbai.

The OTT video streaming service primarily provides content from the company's content library including movies, TV shows, songs, etc. The content is available in languages like Hindi, Gujarati, Marathi, South Indian Languages, Dub Versions of many languages and Punjabi.

The service follows a freemium business model. Some of the content is available for users to stream for free, and the rest requires a subscription to be accessed. It was launched in the US in April 2019.

In July 2020, ShemarooMe announced the launch of its new on-demand movie platform called 'ShemarooMe Box Office.' ShemarooMe has also inked a strategic partnership with BookMyShow, India's leading entertainment destination, to ensure more cine-goers have access to the content.

In July 2026, ShemarooMe acquired content library of Gujarati-language streaming platform, OHO Gujarati.

== Owned channels ==
Channel	Launched	Language	Category
Shemaroo Marathibana	2020	Marathi	Movies
Shemaroo TV	2020	Hindi	GEC
Shemaroo Umang	2022	Hindi	GEC
Shemaroo Josh	2023	Hindi	Movies

=== Shemaroo Marathibana ===
Shemaroo Marathibana is a Marathi language Entertainment channel owned by Shemaroo Entertainment Media Network. It was launched on 14 January 2020.
Current broadcasts

- Haa Mahal Kasala
- Bhagyaresha

=== Former broadcasts ===
Original series

Year	Serial
2023–2024	Sau . Pratap Manasi Supekar
2023–2024	Jogeshwaricha Pati Bhairavnath

=== Shemaroo Umang ===
Shemaroo Umang is a Hindi language General Entertainment free-to-air channel that is owned by Shemaroo Entertainment Media Network. This channel was launched on 5 April 2022.

=== Former broadcasts ===
Original series

Year	Serial
2022–2023	Raazz Mahal – Dakini Ka Rahasya
2022–2023	Kyunkii Tum Hi Ho
2023	Kundali Milan
2023	Gauna – Ek Pratha
2023–2024	Shravani
2022–2024	Kismat Ki Lakiro Se
2024	Chahenge Tumhe Itna
2024	Shamshaan Champa
2024–2025	Main Dil Tum Dhadkan
2025	Jamuniya
2025	Badi Haveli Ki Chhoti Thakurain

=== Shemaroo TV ===
Shemaroo TV is an Indian Hindi-GEC free-to-air television channel owned by Shemaroo Entertainment Media Network. The channel was launched on 1 May 2020 for the entertainment of Indian audience.

=== Former shows ===
Original shows

Year	Serial
2021–2022	Jurm Aur Jazbaat
2022	Crime Diary
2022–2023	Waah Bhai Waah
2023–2024	Karmadhikari Shanidev
2023–2024	Tulsidham Ke Laddu Gopal

=== Shemaroo Josh ===
Shemaroo Josh is an Indian Hindi free-to-air movie channel owned by Shemaroo Entertainment Media Network. It was launched on 1 September 2025 by replacing Chumbak TV and the channel primarily broadcasts Old and Latest Bollywood and South Indian movies dubbed in Hindi.

=== Chumbak TV ===
Chumbak TV is an Indian Hindi-language free-to-air youth centric movie channel which was owned by Shemaroo Entertainment Media Network. The channel was launched on 6 May 2023 and it was Rebrand on 1 September 2025 replacing Shemaroo Josh.
