= Chahenge Tumhe Itna =

Indian drama television series

- Genre: Drama; Family; Romance
- Created by: Ekta Kapoor
- Developed by: Balaji Telefilms
- Written by: Dheeraj Sarna
- Screenplay by: Divya Sinha
- Story by: Divya Sinha
- Directed by: Khwaja Mughal
- Creative director: Shriya Srivastav
- Starring: Bharat Ahlawat; Swati Sharma
- Theme music composer: Nawab Arzoo; Binod Ghimire
- Opening theme: Chahenge Tumhe Itna
- Country of origin: India
- Original language: Hindi
- No. of seasons: 1
- No. of episodes: 156

Production
- Producers: Ekta Kapoor; Shobha Kapoor
- Cinematography: Dharmendra Choudhary
- Editors: Vikas Sharma; Vishal Sharma
- Camera setup: Multi-camera
- Running time: 22–25 minutes
- Production company: Balaji Telefilms

Original release
- Network: Shemaroo Umang
- Release: 20 February – 19 August 2024

Chahenge Tumhe Itna (transl. Will Love You That Much...) is an Indian dramatic television series which premiered on 20 February 2024 on Shemaroo Umang. It was produced by Ekta Kapoor and Shobha Kapoor under Balaji Telefilms. It starred Bharat Ahlawat and Swati Sharma.

== Plot ==
The series aims to break the stereotypes surrounding the daughter-in-law and father-in-law relationship. The series explores the emotional conflicts that arise within family dynamics, especially those that are often left unspoken. The main plot of the series revolves around the tagline 'Kunwari Suhagan' literally meaning unmarried wife!

== Cast ==
=== Main ===
- Bharat Ahlawat as Kunal Chaudhary aka Siddharth "Sid" Sharma: Amrita and Amit's son; Abhimanyu and Kala's adopted son; Aashi's husband; Nidhi and Vidya's brother (2024)
- Swati Sharma as Aashi Chaudhary: Kunal's wife; Vinod and Jaya's daughter (2024)

=== Recurring ===
- Abhay Bhargava as Amit Choudhary: Amrita's husband; Kunal, Nidhi and Vidya's father; Aashi's father-in-law (2024)
- Khyati Keswani as Amrita Choudhary: Amit's wife; Kunal, Nidhi and Vidya's mother; Aashi's mother-in-law (2024)
- Aishwarya Aher as Nidhi Choudhary: Amrita and Amit's younger daughter; Kunal and Vidya's sister (2024)
- Veronica Talreja as Vidya Chaudhary: Amrita and Amit's elder daughter; Kunal and Nidhi's elder sister (2024)
- Prashant Singh Rajput as Vikas: Sid's friend
- Kishan Bhan as Vinod Thakur: Aashi's father (2024)
- Massheuddin Qureshi as Abhimanyu Sharma: Neelima's ex-husband; Kala's husband; Kunal's adoptive father
- Annapurna Bhairi as Girija Devi Chaudhary: Amit's mother; Kunal, Nidhi and Vidya's grandmother
- Hitesh Makhija as Kundan "Fake Kunal" Mishra: Aashi's fiancee’
- Arzoo Govitrikar as Neelima Singh: Kala's sister; Abhimanyu's former wife; Kunal's adopted maternal aunt
- Anjali Gupta as Kala Sharma: Abhimanyu's second wife; Kunal's adopted mother
- Saumya Saraswat as Geet:

== Production ==
The series is developed and produced by Ekta Kapoor and Shobha Kapoor under their banner Balaji Telefilms. First promo was released on 23 January 2024. The series premiered on 20 February 2024 on Shemaroo Umang. Bharat Ahlawat and Swati Sharma were signed as the leads. Abhay Bhargava was cast as the father-in-law and Khyati Keswani as the mother-in-law.
