= Digangana Suryavanshi =

Indian actress and author

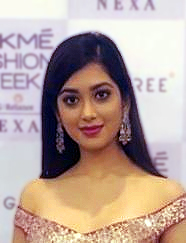
- Born: 15 October 1997 (age 28)
- Education: Mithibai College, Mumbai
- Occupations: Actress, author
- Years active: 2005–present
- Known for: Ek Veer Ki Ardaas...Veera; FryDay

Digangana Suryavanshi (born 15 October 1997) is an Indian actress and author who is known for her appearances in Hindi and Telugu films. Suryavanshi debuted her career in Hindi television and went on to appear in films. Her breakthrough role was 'Veera' in the StarPlus TV series Ek Veer Ki Ardaas...Veera. She also was in the reality show Bigg Boss 9 in 2015. Her Hindi film debut was in FryDay (2018), Telugu film debut in Hippi (2019) and Tamil film debut in Dhanusu Raasi Neyargale (2019).

== Early life ==
Suryavanshi is the only child of Neeraj Suryavanshi and Sarita Suryavanshi. She completed her 12th board at Mithibai College, where she appeared for the exams during the shooting of Ek Veer Ki Ardaas...Veera. Digangana is pursuing an MBA at Narsee Monjee College in Mumbai.

== Career ==
Suryavanshi started her career at the age of seven as a child artist, debuting with the TV series Kya Hadsaa Kya Haqeeqat in 2002. When she was 14, Suryavanshi wrote, composed and sang a song, "I'm missing you", which she dedicated to her maternal grandmother. Suryavanshi also played supporting roles in shows like Shakuntala (2009), Krisshna Arjun and Ruk Jaana Nahin (2011–12). Suryavanshi landed her big break with StarPlus soap opera Ek Veer Ki Ardaas...Veera (2012–15), where she played the title role. In 2015, at the age of 17, she was the youngest celebrity contestant to have participated in the reality show Bigg Boss. She was evicted from the show on 7 December 2015. Suryavanshi participated in the Indian sports reality television show Box Cricket League season I, played for Mumbai Warriors and season II, played for Mumbai Tigers.

Suryavanshi debuted in Bollywood with two films, FryDay and Jalebi. Both films were released on 12 October 2018. Suryavanshi acted in the lead role with Govinda in the film Rangeela Raja, which was released on 18 January 2019.

Suryavanshi played the lead actress in the Telugu film Hippi, which was directed by Krishnan K.T. Nagarajan. A writer for Firstpost.com, Hemanth Kumar, wrote that Suryavanshi, "is good in her role and she might be the only one who took her role far too seriously in the film. Right from her introduction scene to the climax, she's consistently good in terms of her body language and her attitude that the role required." Her latest theatrical release Shivam Bhaje, a telugu mystical thriller released in theaters worldwide on 1 August 2024.

== Filmography ==
=== Films ===
Key
†	Denotes films that have not yet been released

Year	Title	Role	Language	Notes
2018	FryDay	Bindu Ranpal	Hindi	
2018	Jalebi	Anu	Hindi	
2019	Rangeela Raja	Shivranjani	Hindi	
2019	Hippi	Amuktamalyada aka Ammu	Telugu	
2019	Dhanusu Raasi Neyargale	KR Vijaya	Tamil	
2020	Valayam	Disha	Telugu	
2022	Seetimaarr	Akruthi	Telugu	
2022	Crazy Fellow	Madhu	Telugu	
2024	Shivam Bhaje	Sailaja	Telugu	

=== Television ===
Year	Name	Role	Notes	Ref
2002	Kya Hadsaa Kya Haqeeqat	—N/a	Child artist	
2005	Krishna Arjun	—N/a		
2009	Shakuntala	Rajkumari Gauri		
2011	Ruk Jaana Nahin	Palakshi Tarachand Mathur		
2012	Qubool Hai	Nuzzhat Ahmed Khan		
2013–15	Ek Veer Ki Ardaas...Veera	Veera Baldev Singh		
2014–15	Box Cricket League	Contestant	Player in Mumbai Warriors	
2015	Bigg Boss 9	Contestant	Entered Day 1, Evicted Day 57	
2016	Box Cricket League 2	Contestant	Player in Mumbai Tigers	
2017	Cinta di Pangkuan Himalaya	Digi		

=== Music videos ===
Year	Album	Language
2011	Rad karne ko	Hindi
2011	Aiso achambho	Hindi
2011	Shaarda maihar main	Hindi
2011	Maiya Singha Chad Durga	Hindi
2019	Ve Tu	Hindi
2019	Tu Hai Toh	Hindi

== Bibliography ==
Books	ISBN
WAVES – The Endless Emotions − Published By – Vakils, Feffer and Simons	81-8462-058-6
Nixie the Mermaid and The Power of Love − Published By – Shroff Publishers & Distributors Pvt. Ltd – First edition (2013) & Notion Press – Second Edition(2016)	978-93-5206-614-8

== See also ==
- List of Hindi television actresses
