= Khushwant Walia =

Indian television actor (born 1987)

- Born: Khushwant Walia; Mumbai, India
- Education: Mumbai University
- Occupation: Actor
- Years active: 2012–present
- Height: 180 cm (5 ft 11 in)

Khushwant Walia is an Indian television actor. He is known for playing the role of Rubel Deewan in the Star Plus' television series Pyaar Ka Dard Hai Meetha Meetha Pyaara Pyaara. Later Walia also joined the cast of Life OKs Mere Rang Mein Rangne Waali. Walia was seen in Colors TV's Ishq Ka Rang Safed. He was also seen as Aarav Bharadwaj in Colors TV's Sasural Simar Ka.

== Television ==
Year	Serial	Role	Channel
2012–2014	Pyaar Ka Dard Hai Meetha Meetha Pyaara Pyaara	Rubel Deewan	Star Plus
2013	Gustakh Dil	Arjun	Life OK
2015	Mere Rang Mein Rangne Waali	Kabir Kapoor	Life OK
2016	Ishq Ka Rang Safed	Raja Awasthi	Colors TV
2017	Sasural Simar Ka	Aarav Bharadwaj	Colors TV
2018	Piyaa Albela	Arjun Vyas	Zee TV
2018	Laal Ishq	Atul Agnihotri	&TV
2019	Naagin	Raj	Colors TV
2019	Yeh Rishta Kya Kehlata Hai	Mihir Kapoor	Star Plus
2022–2023	Woh Toh Hai Albelaa	Yash Jindal	Star Bharat
2023	Kismat Ki Lakiro Se	Dr. Neeraj	Shemaroo Umang
2024	Mangal Lakshmi	Manan	Colors TV
