= Rashami Desai =

Indian actress (born 1986)

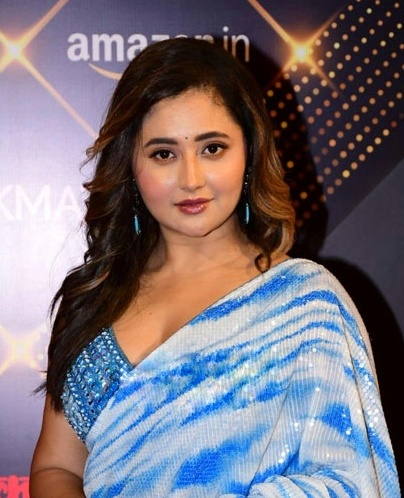
- Desai in 2022
- Born: Shivani Desai; 13 February 1986 (age 40); Nagaon, Assam, India
- Other names: Divya Desai; Rashmi Desai
- Occupation: Actress
- Years active: 2002–present
- Notable work: Uttaran; Dil Se Dil Tak; Bigg Boss 13; Naagin (2015 TV series)
- Spouse: Nandish Sandhu (m. 2011; div. 2016)

Shivani Desai (pronounced [ˈɾəʃmiː d̪eˈsaːi]; born 13 February 1986), professionally known as Rashami Desai, is an Indian television and film actress. She is the recipient of several accolades including two Indian Television Academy Awards and Gold Awards. She has established herself as one of the most popular, successful and highest-paid actresses on television.

== Early life ==
Rashami Desai was born Shivani Desai on 13 February 1986 in Nagaon town of Assam. She is a Gujarati by origin. She has a brother, Gaurav Desai. Desai was brought up in Mumbai and did her schooling and undergraduation there. Rashami pursued a diploma degree in Tours and Travels from Narsee Monjee College of Commerce and Economics, Mumbai.

== Career ==
=== Acting debut in films (2002–2006) ===
Desai began her acting career with regional films where she appeared in an Assamese-language film titled Kanyadaan in 2002. Desai made her Bollywood debut with Birendra Nath Tiwari-directed 2004 romantic mystery Yeh Lamhe Judaai Ke alongside Shah Rukh Khan and Raveena Tandon. She essayed the role of Sheetal, a college student whose elder sister (played by Tandon) is murdered.

In 2005, Desai appeared in the Hindi film Shabnam Mausi, where she played the role of Naina alongside Ashutosh Rana and Vijay Raaz. She later earned fame in the Bhojpuri film industry where she played many roles in the films like Balma Bada Nadaan and Gabbar Singh. In 2005, Desai starred in the film Kab Hoi Gawna Hamar, that went on to win the National Award for Best Feature Film in Bhojpuri.

=== Television debut and breakthrough (2006–2008) ===
Desai made her television debut in 2006 with the mythological drama series Raavan on Zee TV, where she played the role of Queen Mandodari. Desai was cast opposite Jay Soni in the series. In 2007, Desai appeared in the English film titled Sambar Salsa.

In 2008, Desai got her first big break in daily soaps that fetched her the limelight with her portrayal of the dual role of Nikki Shrivastav and Pari Rai Choudhary in Star One's Pari Hoon Main. Directed and produced by Ravi Chopra, the series also featured Mohit Malik and Karan Veer Mehra in pivotal roles. The show followed the story of two look-alikes; Pari (an actress) and Nikki (a simple girl) who bump into each other, exchange their identities, and begin living each other's lives. Desai then appeared as Priya in Star One's horror thriller anthology series Ssshhhh...Phir Koi Hai alongside Manish Paul.

=== Established success with Uttaran (2009–2016) ===
In 2009, Desai briefly appeared in Meet Mila De Rabba aired on Sony TV where she played the role of Dr. Meher Datta alongside Surilie Gautam and Piyush Sahdev.

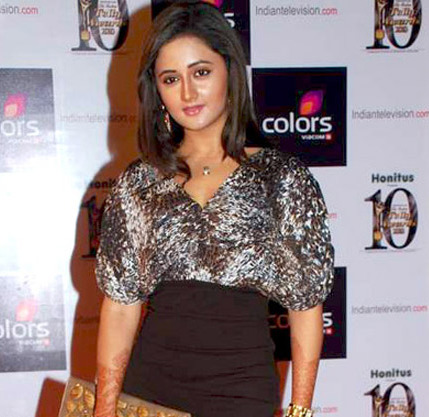
Desai at Indian Telly Awards 2010, where she received the award for Best Actress in a Negative Role for her work in Uttaran

Desai earned widespread acclaim and recognition upon entering Colors TV's long-running soap opera Uttaran in 2009, where she played the parallel lead alongside Tina Datta and Nandish Sandhu. The series followed the story of two friends, Ichcha and Tapasya, who hail from different strata of the society. Desai replaced Ishita Panchal to play the role of adult Tapasya Thakur, a rich girl who gets manipulated by her maternal grandmother upon feeling less loved than her friend by her own parents. Uttaran opened up newer international markets for Indian Television, making Desai a household name beyond the country's shores. For Uttaran, Desai received numerous accolades and nominations including the ITA Award for Best Actress Popular and Indian Telly Award for Best Actress in a Negative Role Popular in 2010. In January 2012 she opted out of the show. On 7 November 2012, she returned to Uttaran with positive shades, and left the show again in 2014 citing creative differences.

In 2010, Desai participated in Sony TV's comedy reality TV show Comedy Circus 3 Ka Tadka as a wildcard entrant with Vikrant Massey. Desai then participated as a member of the team "Massakalli Girls" in season 2 of the dance reality television show Zara Nachke Dikha which aired on Star Plus. Her team emerged as winners. In the same year, Desai also appeared as panellist in Imagine TV's reality show Meethi Choori No 1 and participated in Sony TV's comedy reality show Comedy Circus Mahasangram.

In 2011, Desai participated in StarPlus's comedy reality TV show Comedy Ka Maha Muqabala, where her team emerged as runner-ups.

In 2012, Desai appeared as Shivani in the Vikram Bhatt-directed horror anthology series Haunted Nights, aired on Sahara One. She then participated in the dance reality TV show Jhalak Dikhhla Jaa 5 which aired on Colors TV and ultimately emerged as the first runner up. She also appeared on the Shekhar Suman hosted show Movers & Shakers. Later in 2012, Desai made a cameo appearance in the Salman Khan starrer Hindi film Dabangg 2.

In 2013, Desai played the part of Natkhat Sali in Colors TV's stand-up comedy show Nautanki: The Comedy Theatre.

In 2014, Desai appeared as a victim of blind faith and a woman who is tortured by her own family in the episode-based shows Savdhaan India and CID respectively.

In 2015, Desai participated in Fear Factor: Khatron Ke Khiladi 6. She was eliminated, but was brought back on the show as a wild card entrant. She was again eliminated just before the finale along with Sana Khan. She then participated in Nach Baliye 7 with her then spouse Nandish Sandhu and they became first runners-up. In October 2015, Desai appeared as a deaf and mute girl in Palash Muchhal's music video titled Teri Ek Hassi alongside Nandish Sandhu. It was sung by Jubin Nautiyal. Later in the year, Desai briefly appeared in Colors TV's Ishq Ka Rang Safed where she played the grey role of Tulsi, a widow with hidden motives.

In 2016, Desai essayed the negative role of dark supernatural character Preeti in &TV's Adhuri Kahaani Hamari. She also participated in Box Cricket League in March 2016. Desai then appeared in Palash Muchhal's dance based music video titled Sajna Ve alongside Salman Yusuff Khan. It was sung by Monali Thakur and Dilip Soni. Desai then participated in Balaji Telefilms' comedy reality show Mazaak Mazaak Mein, aired on Life OK.

=== Dil Se Dil Tak and beyond (2017–2020) ===
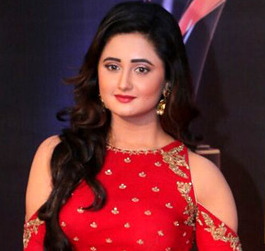
Desai at Golden Petal Awards 2017, where she was nominated under Best Actress Category for her work in Dil Se Dil Tak

In 2017, Desai starred in Colors TV's drama series Dil Se Dil Tak, opposite Sidharth Shukla and Jasmin Bhasin. Desai was cast in the role of Shorvari Bhanushali, a woman caught between love for her husband and her desire to be a mother. The series was loosely based on the Hindi film Chori Chori Chupke Chupke (2001). Desai described her role as someone who "doesn't express through words. She uses gestures, eyes and her facial expressions to express what she is feeling. That is interesting. In fact, as an actor, this gives me a lot of scope for performance.". For her role in the series, she was nominated under Best Actress category at Golden Petal Awards 2017.

In the same year, Desai made her Gujarati film debut with Bhavin Wadia's romantic thriller Superstar, where she was cast opposite Dhruvin Shah, worked wonders at the box office had not only been appreciated by critics in Gujarat, but also had a dream run at the BO, with shows running housefull even in its seventh week. Desai won award for Best Debut Actress at Gujarati Transmedia Awards 2018. Desai also participated in Tennis Premier League as the brand ambassador of her team Binny’s Brigade in October 2018.

Desai began 2019 with the lead role in DD National's comedy series Chalo Saaf Karein. Launched by Doordarshan along with the Ministry of Drinking Water and Sanitation, the show revolved around cleanliness and sanitation with a comic twist. Desai played the role of Palak, an ambitious Delhi University graduate and a strong follower of Gandhian ideology and Swachhta, who intends to open a residential English medium school in her village. The series also featured Ashish Lal, Aruna Irani and Anita Raj in pivotal roles. Later in the year, Desai participated in the reality show Bigg Boss 13, where she finished as third runner up.

In 2020, Desai essayed the role of Shalaka on Colors TV's supernatural fantasy thriller television series Naagin 4: Bhagya Ka Zehreela Khel alongside Nia Sharma, Anita Hassanandani and Vijayendra Kumeria and also in Naagin 5 as special appearance. Desai next appeared in the short film Tamas alongside Adhvik Mahajan, where she played the role of Sania and participated in Ladies vs Gentlemen, a reality interactive game show hosted by Ritesh Deshmukh and Genelia D'Souza in the same year. In December 2020, Desai featured in Palash Muchhal's dance based music video titled Ab Kya Jaan Legi Meri alongside Shaheer Sheikh and Sana Saeed. It was sung by Palash Muchhal and Amit Mishra.

=== Professional expansion (2021–present) ===
In 2021, Desai made her web debut alongside Tanuj Virwani in Nivedita Basu-directed crime drama web series titled Tandoor, the series was nominated in filmfare OTT awards 2021 under best web series category. Loosely based on the infamous Tandoor case in Delhi, Desai essayed the role of Palak Sahni, an aspiring politician who is murdered by her own husband (played by Virwani). In May 2021, it was announced that Desai will collaborate with singer Rahul Vaidya for a music cover. In September 2021, Desai appeared in Altamash Faridi's music video titled Subhan Allah. Later in the year, Desai collaborated with Rahul Vaidya again for a music video titled Zindagi Khafa Khafa. In November 2021, Desai entered Bigg Boss 15 as a wildcard contestant and became the fifth runner-up.

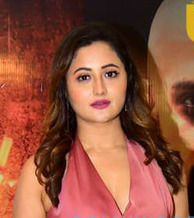
Desai in 2021

In March 2022, Desai featured in three music videos titled Qatilana, Biraj Mein Jhoom and Tere Pind. She then entered Naagin 6 for a cameo to portray the dual role shape-shifting serpents, reprising the role of Shalaka from season 4 with positive shades, and a new character Shanglira. In April 2022, Desai collaborated with Neha Bhasin for a music video titled Parwah and also featured in a music video titled Khayalat.

Desai next appeared as the titular character of the segment Ruby in the second season of Anil V Kumar's anthology series Ratri Ke Yatri, became most streamed show & most binged show on Hungama Play. Also featuring Abigail Pande and Mohit Abrol in Desai's segment, the series throws an empathetic light on women from red light areas. The show premiered on Hungama Play and MX Player on 11 October 2022.

In 2023, Desai participated in Colors TV's comedy reality TV show Entertainment Ki Raat Housefull. Desai next appeared in a brief role in the JioCinema series titled LLB - Bas Naam Hi Kaafi Hai. In September 2023, Desai featured in a music video titled Pyar Eda Da alongside Shoaib Ibrahim sung by Jyoti Nooran.

In 2024, Desai appeared in the Atrangii series titled Womaniya. The show premiered on 22 March 2024. She made her comeback on big screen with Bollywood movie titled JNU: Jahangir National University alongside Urvashi Rautela. The movie released in theatres on 21 June 2024.

In 2025, Desai appeared in the Gujarati film in Dharmessh Mehta-directed family drama Mom Tane Nai Samjay, where she was cast opposite Amar Upadhyay. The movie released in theatres on 10 January 2025. After a successful hit the movie premiered on ShemarooMe and OTTplay on 24 July 2025. Desai next appeared alongside R. Madhavan in Ashwni Dhir-directed satirical action comedy web series titled Hisaab Barabar. The show released on ZEE5 on 24 January 2025. Desai next appeared in television sitcom Wagle Ki Duniya – Nayi Peedhi Naye Kissey for a cameo to portrayed the role of Advocate Meenakshi Kapoor on Sony SAB. In July 2025, Desai featured in two music videos titled Rajj Rajj Nachan and Juda Hona Hai. Desai next appeared alongside Karanvir Bohra in micro drama web series titled Roadpati Bana Crorepati. The show released on Kuku FM and Kuku TV App on 22 September 2025 became success. In November 2025, Desai featured in devotional based music video titled Kanha Krishna Murari alongside Shiv Thakare sung by Seeta Qasemi for the promotion of Kanha Devotional Companion products.

As of 2026, Desai was signed for the role of Maya Brar in StarPlus's Sayoneee and marking her television comeback after a 8 years of hiatus.

== Off-screen work and media image ==
Desai is a trained classical dancer. Writing for The Indian Express, journalist Sana Farzeen stated: "Not someone to play the perfect heroine, Rashami has experimented with her roles and played strong characters." Apart from acting, Desai supports various causes. Desai walked the ramp at Caring with Style fashion show to raise money for cancer patients in 2015 and 2018 for designers Shaina NC and Abu Jani-Sandeep Khosla respectively. In 2015, she walked the ramp of a fashion show to support Smile Foundation, a non-governmental organisation working towards underprivileged children's education and health. Desai also walked the ramp for Terry Fox Foundation and Maheka Mirpuri. Desai was part of the Swachh Survekshan 2017, an initiative for an environmentally cleaner India (Swachh Bharat Abhiyan).

Desai walked the ramp for designers Rohit Verma and Anu Mehra at Bombay Times Fashion Week in 2020 and 2021.

Desai was reported to be the highest paid contestant in Bigg Boss 13 and Bigg Boss 15. In 2020, Desai became the first Indian Television actor to collaborate with Google for cameos. Desai was ranked 22nd in BizAsia's list of top 30 TV Personalities in 2020.

Desai endorsed Wheel alongside Salman Khan in 2010. In 2021, Desai became the brand ambassador of JioMart. Desai also endorses Hangyo. In 2023, Desai became the brand ambassador and entrepreneur of Glamveda matte mini liquid lipsticks. In 2024, Desai became the brand ambassador of international company Tradeomatic to endorse international brands TokiBaby and TokiHealth products. In 2025, Desai became the brand ambassador of Homero. In 2026, Desai became the founder of Raaga Desai.

== Personal life ==
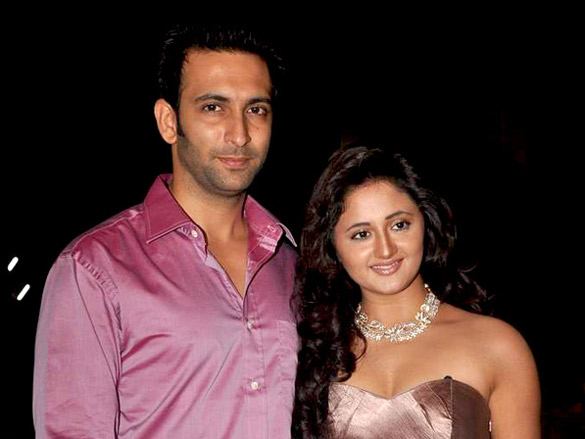
Desai with her ex-husband Nandish Sandhu

She married her co-star from Uttaran, Nandish Sandhu, on 12 February 2011 in Ghaziabad. In 2014, they separated, and in 2015, the couple filed for divorce after almost four years of marriage. It was finalised in March 2016.

In 2018, Desai met Arhaan Khan, they both participated in Bigg Boss 13 in 2019, where Arhaan proposed to Desai, and Desai accepted the proposal. Later, it was revealed by Salman Khan that Arhaan was married before and had a kid which he had kept secret from Desai. In 2020, after coming out from the Bigg Boss house, Desai broke up with Arhaan.

== Filmography ==
Key

†	Denotes films that have not yet been released

=== Films ===
Year	Title	Role	Language	Notes	Ref(s)
2002	Kanyadaan		Assamese	Cameo	
2003	Balma Bada Nadaan	Gauri/Jugni	Bhojpuri		
2003	Maai Re Karde Bidaai Hamaar	Kiran	Bhojpuri		
2003	Kab Hoi Gawna Hamar	Gauri	Bhojpuri	National Award for Best Feature Film in Bhojpuri	
2004	Yeh Lamhe Judaai Ke	Sheetal	Hindi	Credited as Divya Desai	
2004	Tulsi		Bhojpuri	Award Winning Film	
2004	Sohagan Bana Da Sajana Hamaar	Gauri	Bhojpuri		
2005	Gazab Bhail Rama	Gauri/Jyoti	Bhojpuri		
2005	Nadiya Ke Teer	Radha	Bhojpuri		
2005	Dulha Babu	Jyoti	Bhojpuri		
2005	Bandan Toote Na		Bhojpuri		
2005	Shabnam Mausi	Naina	Hindi		
2006	Hum Balbrahma Chaari Tu Kanya Kumari	Jamuna	Bhojpuri		
2006	Bambai Ki Laila Chapra Ka Chaila		Bhojpuri		
2006	Kable Aayee Bahaar	Anu	Bhojpuri		
2006	Kangna Khanke Piya Ke Angna	Maya	Bhojpuri		
2006	Pappu Ke Pyar Ho Gail	Priya	Bhojpuri		
2006	Sathi Sanghati	Radha	Bhojpuri		
2006	Tohse Pyar Ba	Shefali	Bhojpuri		
2007	Sambar Salsa		English		
2007	Hum Hai Gawaar	Preeti	Bhojpuri		
2008	Gabbar Singh		Bhojpuri	Special appearance in holi song	
2008	Pyar Jab Kehu Se Hoi Jala	Sangeeta	Bhojpuri		
2008	Shahar Wali Jaan Mareli	Pammi	Bhojpuri		
2008	Umariya Kaili Tohre Naam	Radha	Bhojpuri		
2010	Laakhon Mein Ek Hamaar Bhauji	Gauri	Bhojpuri		
2010	Kanoon Hamra Mutthi Mein	Pooja	Bhojpuri		
2012	Dabangg 2	Bride	Hindi	Cameo appearance in the song "Dagabaaz Re"	
2017	Superstar	Anjali Kapadia	Gujarati		
2020	Tamas	Saina/Sania	Hindi; Urdu	Short film	
2024	JNU: Jahangir National University	Yuvedita Menon	Hindi		
2025	Mom Tane Nai Samjay	Aashka	Gujarati		
TBA	Mission Laila †	TBA	Hindi		
TBA	Evara-Blessing Of God †	TBA	Hindi		
TBA	Chambe Di Booti †	TBA	Punjabi		

=== Web series ===
Year	Title	Role	Notes	Ref.
2021	Tandoor	Palak Sahni / Palak Sharma		
2022	Ratri Ke Yatri	Ruby		
2023	LLB - Bas Naam Hi Kaafi Hai	Preeti		
2024	Womaniya	Binni		
2025	Hisaab Barabar	Monalisa Yadav		
2025	Roadpati Bana Crorepati	Avani		

=== Television ===
Year	Title	Role	Notes
2006–2008	Raavan	Mandodari	
2008	Pari Hoon Main	Pari Rai Choudhary / Nikki Shrivastav	
2008	Ssshhhh...Phir Koi Hai	Priya	
2009	Meet Mila De Rabba	Dr. Meher Datta	
2009–2014	Uttaran	Tapasya Thakur Rathore	
2010	Comedy Circus 3 Ka Tadka	Contestant	
2010	Meethi Choori No 1	Contestant	
2010	Zara Nachke Dikha 2	Contestant	Winner
2010	Comedy Circus Ke SuperStars	Host	
2011	Comedy Ka Maha Muqabala	Arshad Ke Punters Member	Runner-up
2012	Haunted Nights	Shivani	
2012	Jhalak Dikhhla Jaa 5	Contestant	1st runner-up
2013	Nautanki: The Comedy Theatre	Natkhat Sali	
2014	CID	Sakshi	
2014	Savdhaan India	Aanchal/Mata	
2015	Fear Factor: Khatron Ke Khiladi 6	Contestant	9th place
2015	Nach Baliye 7	Contestant	1st runner-up
2015	Ishq Ka Rang Safed	Tulsi	
2016	Adhuri Kahaani Hamari	Preeti	
2016	Box Cricket League 2	Contestant	
2016	Mazaak Mazaak Mein	Contestant	
2017–2018	Dil Se Dil Tak	Shorvori Bhattacharya	
2017	Rasoi Ki Jung Mummyon Ke Sung	Contestant	
2018	Tennis Premier League	Player	
2019	Chalo Saaf Karein	Palak	
2019	Khatra Khatra Khatra	Contestant	
2019–2020	Bigg Boss 13	Contestant	3rd runner-up
2020	Naagin 4	Nayantara/Shalaka	
2020	Ladies vs Gentlemen	Panelist	
2021–2022	Bigg Boss 15	Contestant	5th runner-up
2022	Naagin 6	Shanglira/Shalaka	
2022	The Khatra Khatra Show	Contestant	
2023	Entertainment Ki Raat Housefull	Contestant	
2025	Wagle Ki Duniya – Nayi Peedhi Naye Kissey	Advocate Meenakshi Kapoor	Cameo Appearance
2025-2026	Rashami Ke Dil Se Dil Tak	Producer/Host	
2026–present	Sayoneee	Maya Brar	

==== Special appearances ====
Year	Title	Role
2009	Vicky Ki Taxi	Herself
2011	Jhalak Dikhhla Jaa 4	Herself
2011	Dance India Dance 3	Herself
2011	Ratan Ka Rishta	Herself
2011	Stars Ka Tadka	Herself
2011	India's Got Talent season 3	Herself
2011	Nachle Ve with Saroj Khan	Herself
2012	Bigg Boss 5	Herself
2012	Movers & Shakers	Herself
2012	Comedy Ka Jashn	Herself
2013	Bigg Boss 6	Herself
2013	Jhalak Dikhhla Jaa 6	Herself
2013	Comedy Nights with Kapil	Herself
2014	Nach Baliye 6	Herself
2014	Comedy Nights with Kapil	Herself
2015	Jamai Raja	Herself
2015	Farah Ki Daawat	Herself
2015	Pesbukers	Herself
2015	Comedy Nights with Kapil	Herself
2015	Aaj Ki Raat Hai Zindagi	Herself
2016	Ek Tha Raja Ek Thi Rani	Herself
2016	Comedy Nights Live	Herself
2017	Bigg Boss 10	Herself
2017	Ek Shringaar-Swabhiman	Shorvari
2017	Shakti – Astitva Ke Ehsaas Ki	Shorvari
2017	Bigg Boss 11	Herself
2017	Entertainment Ki Raat	Herself
2018	Tu Aashiqui	Shorvori
2018	Belan Wali Bahu	Shorvori
2018	MTV Ace of Space 1	Herself
2018	Naagin 3	Herself
2019	Kitchen Champion 5	Herself
2020	Mujhse Shaadi Karoge	Herself
2020	Naagin 5	Shalaka
2021	Bigg Boss 14	Herself
2021	Bigg Boss OTT	Herself
2021	Bigg Boss 15	Herself
2024	Laughter Chefs – Unlimited Entertainment	Herself
2025	United State Of Gujarat	Herself
2026	Tum Ho Naa - Ghar Ki Superstar	Herself

=== Music videos ===
Year	Title	Singer(s)	Ref.
2004	Doliya Kahaar	Anuradha Paudwal and Sunil Chhaila Bihari	
2015	Teri Ek Hassi	Jubin Nautiyal	
2016	Sajna Ve	Monali Thakur and Dilip Soni	
2020	Ab Kya Jaan Legi Meri	Palash Muchhal and Amit Mishra	
2021	Kinna Sona	Rahul Vaidya	
2021	Subhan Allah	Altamash Faridi	
2021	Zindagi Khafa Khafa	Rahul Vaidya	
2022	Qatilana	Ajay Keswani and Aakansha Sharma	
2022	Biraj Mein Jhoom	Anuradha Palakurthi Juju	
2022	Tere Pind	Gurlez Akhtar and Fateh Shergill	
2022	Parwah	Neha Bhasin	
2022	Khayalat	Faisla Khan	
2023	Pyar Eda Da	Jyoti Nooran	
2025	Rajj Rajj Nachan	Divya Kumar, Ishika Hirve and Sikandar Maan	
2025	Juda Hona Hai	Altamash Faridi	
2025	Kanha Krishna Murari	Seeta Qasemi	

=== Theatres ===
Year	Work	Role	Language	Ref.
2022	Teen Bunder	Naina	Gujarati	
2025	Aankh Micholi	Sandhya	Hindi	
2025-2026	Mrs Mara Online Che	Hansa	Gujarati	
2026–present	Swayamsiddha KUNTI	Kunti	Hindi	

== Awards and nominations ==
Year	Award	Category	Film/Show	Result	Ref(s)
2009	Indian Telly Awards	Popular Actor in Negative Role (Female)	Uttaran	Nominated	
2009	Indian Television Academy Awards	GR8! Ensemble Cast	Uttaran	Won	
2010	Indian Television Academy Awards	Best Actress (Popular)	Uttaran	Won	
2010	Indian Telly Awards	Most Popular Actor in a Negative Role (Female)	Uttaran	Won	
2010	BIG Star Entertainment Awards	Most Entertaining Actor Female	Uttaran	Nominated	
2010	Gold Awards	Best Actor in a Negative Role (Female)	Uttaran	Won	
2011	Star Guild Awards	Best Actor-Female in a Drama Series	Uttaran	Nominated	
2011	FICCI Frames Excellence Awards	Best TV Actor (Female)	Uttaran	Won	
2011	Apsara Awards	Best Ensemble Cast	Uttaran	Won	
2011	Gold Awards	Best Actor Female (Popular)	Uttaran	Nominated	
2011	Gold Awards	Best Actress (Critics)	Uttaran	Won	
2012	Apsara Awards	Best Actress in Drama Series	Uttaran	Nominated	
