= Superstar (2017 film) =

2017 Gujarati romantic film by Bhavin Wadia

- Official poster
- Directed by: Bhavin Wadia
- Screenplay by: Mrugank Shah & Deep Lalani
- Produced by: Snehan Dave
- Starring: Dhruvin Shah; Rashami Desai
- Cinematography: Girish Kant
- Music by: Parth Bharat Thakkar
- Distributed by: RR Films
- Release date: 3 February 2017
- Country: India
- Language: Gujarati

Superstar (2017) is a Gujarati romantic thriller film directed by Bhavin Wadia. It is presented by Navkar Events Private Limited and produced by Snehan Dave. The film marks the debut of Dhruvin Shah and is the first Gujarati film of TV actor Rashami Desai. The film was slated to release on 3 February 2017. The film was released on Netflix in the US on 10 August 2017.

== Plot ==
Rishi Kapadia aka RK is a reigning Bollywood superstar. Married to Anjali (Rashami Desai), he has a son and a happy family. Their smooth life is shaken up and thrown out of gear when a series of incidents put RK and Anjali's life in a fix. The film tells the story of their race to find out who is trying to destroy their lives before the antagonist succeeds.

== Cast ==
- Dhruvin Shah as Rishi Kapadia aka RK
- Rashami Desai as Anjali Kapadia
- Harshad kumar as inspector vaghela

== Soundtrack ==
Superstar features songs sung by Armaan Malik, Shekhar Ravjiani, Arvind Vegda and Aishwarya Majumdar.

Music and background score for the film is composed by Parth Bharat Thakkar.

Superstar

Soundtrack album by Parth Bharat Thakkar
- Genre: Feature film soundtrack
- Label: Zee Music Gujarati

Tracklist
No.	Title	Artist(s)	Length
1.	"Aayo Maro Superstar"	Arvind Vegda & Meet Jain (Rap)	03:04
2.	"Jaadugari"	Armaan Malik	03:35
3.	"Ibaadat"	Shekhar Ravjiani and Aishwarya Majumdar	04:27

== Awards and nominations ==
Award	Category	Recipient(s) and nominee(s)	Result
Gujarati Iconic Film Awards (GIFA 2017)	Best Actress	Rashami Desai	Nominated
Gujarati Iconic Film Awards (GIFA 2017)	Best Male Debut	Dhruvin Shah	Won
Gujarati Transmedia Awards (2018)	Best Debut Actress	Rashami Desai	Won
Gujarati Transmedia Awards (2018)	Best Debut Actor	Dhruvin Shah	Won
