= Peterson Hill =

- Genre: Drama
- Created by: Ashwni Dhir
- Starring: See below
- Music by: Abhijeet Hegdepatil
- Country of origin: India
- Original language: Hindi
- No. of seasons: 1
- No. of episodes: 110

Production
- Producer: Ashwni Dhir
- Production locations: Mumbai, Maharashtra, India
- Camera setup: Multi-camera
- Production company: Garima Productions

Original release
- Network: SAB TV
- Release: 26 January – 26 June 2015

Peterson Hill is an Indian drama television series, which aired on Sony SAB and premiered on 26 January 2015. The series follows the lives of individuals who reside in the hill station and the family of the station master, Kishorilal Chadda, played by Rohit Roy. The series ended on 26 June 2015 due to low ratings.

== Cast ==
- Rohit Roy as Kishorilal Chadda / Jaggu
- Sucheta Khanna as Pinky Chadda
- Ashwin Mushran as Peterson
- Mansi Srivastava as Shatabdi/Khusbu Joshi
- Samiksha Bhatnagar as Jwala Joshi
- Winy Tripathi as Raju guide
- Abbas Khan as Nawab
- Harsh Khurana as Rahul Cheater/ Chor
- Manisha Marzara as Kamini
- Rakesh Srivastav as Tyagiji Hawaldar Anil Tyagi
- Anup Upadhyay as Chadha Lal's Tau/Taoji/Tauji
- Sunil Kumar as Choteram
- Yogesh Tripathi as Bara Ram
- Navnindra Bhel as Simi Chadda (Dadi) Kishorilal Chadda's Mother
- Pratham Shetty as Tony's Brother
- Manisha Marzara as Kamini
- Sanjay Chaudhary as Chadhalal Pilot Singh
- Ishtiyak Khan as Tinda Ram
- Swati Das as Rani Bhikaran
- Tanuj Vyasas Pushtak Pandey
- Aditya Singh Rajput as Tony
- Susheel Parashar as Tony's Father
- Abhay Singh as Negetive
