= Pitambar =

- Film poster
- Directed by: Imran
- Produced by: Ravi H Limbani
- Starring: Mithun Chakraborty; Ravi Kishan; Raza Murad; Kiran Kumar
- Music by: Suraj Kiran
- Production company: Patel Enterprises
- Release date: 8 May 1992
- Running time: 135 minutes
- Country: India
- Language: Hindi

Pitambar is a 1992 Indian Hindi-language action film directed by Imran, starring Mithun Chakraborty, Ravi Kishan, Raza Murad and Kiran Kumar. This is the Hindi film debut of Bhojpuri star Ravi Kishan.

== Plot ==
Shankar (Mithun Chakraborty) is a righteous man who consistently stands against corruption and injustice in his community. His opposition to local crime lords Vikram (Raza Murad) and Jaggan (Kiran Kumar) puts him and his family in direct danger as the syndicates attempt to tighten their grip over the region. Alongside Rameshwar (Ravi Kishan), Sunil (Jay Mathur), and Anuja (Jaya Swami), Shankar navigates escalating violence and personal betrayals orchestrated by Vikram and Jaggan. Supported by Sadhana Chachi (Aruna Irani), he rallies his allies to dismantle the criminal network and avenge the wrongs inflicted upon his loved ones, culminating in a final confrontation against Vikram and Jaggan.

== Cast ==
- Mithun Chakraborty as Shankar
- Ravi Kishan as Rameshwar
- Raza Murad as Vikram
- Kiran Kumar as Jaggan
- Jay Mathur as Sunil
- Jaya Swami as Anuja
- Aruna Irani as Sadhana Chachi

== Songs ==
1. "Aaja Aaja Na Na" - Kumar Sanu, Sadhana Sargam
2. "Baba Chale Hain" - Mohammed Aziz
3. "Dil Ne Tujhe Yaad Kiya" - Kumar Sanu, Sadhana Sargam
4. "Sajna Sajna" - Kumar Sanu, Sadhana Sargam
5. "Aaja Sanam" - Kumar Sanu, Dilraj Kaur
6. "Humko Jaana Tumse" - Kumar Sanu, Sadhana Sargam
