= Kab Hoi Gawna Hamar =

2005 Indian Bhojpuri-language film

- Directed by: Anand D. Ghatraj
- Produced by: Deepa Narayan
- Starring: Ravi Kishan; Rashami Desai
- Release date: 2005
- Country: India
- Language: Bhojpuri

Kab Hoi Gawna Hamar (transl.: When Shall I Go to My Husband’s Home) is a 2005 Indian Bhojpuri-language film produced by Deepa Narayan and directed by Anand D. Ghatraj. The film won the National Film Award for Best Feature Film in Bhojpuri in 2005. This film is based on a family drama that reflects traditional values and modern day sensibilities. The film was notably one of the first Bhojpuri films to be extensively shot in Mauritius.

== Cast ==
- Ravi Kishan
- Rashami Desai
- Udit Narayan
- Deepali
- Madhuri Mishra
