= Hisaab Barabar =

2024 Indian film by Ashwni Dhir

- Official release poster
- Directed by: Ashwni Dhir
- Written by: Screenplay: Ashwni Dhir; Purva Naresh; Ritesh Shastri; Dolphy Fernandes; Dialogues: Ashwni Dhir; Purva Naresh
- Story by: Ritesh Shastri
- Produced by: Sharad Patel; Shreyanshi Patel; Jyoti Deshpande
- Starring: R. Madhavan; Neil Nitin Mukesh; Kirti Kulhari; Rashami Desai; Faisal Rashid; Rajesh Jais; Imran Hasnee
- Cinematography: Santosh Thundiyil
- Edited by: Manan Sagar
- Music by: Aman Pant
- Production companies: Jio Studios; SP Cinecorp
- Distributed by: ZEE5
- Release dates: 26 November 2024 (Goa); 24 January 2025
- Running time: 111 minutes
- Country: India
- Language: Hindi

Hisaab Barabar (transl. Settle the Score) is a 2024 Indian Hindi-language comedy thriller film written and directed by Ashwni Dhir. The film stars R. Madhavan in the lead role, with Neil Nitin Mukesh, Kirti Kulhari, Rashami Desai, and Faisal Rashid in supporting roles. The story follows a railway ticket checker who uncovers discrepancies in minor bank transactions, which leads him to uncover deeper systemic corruption. The film is produced by Jio Studios and SP Cinecorp. The film premiered at the 55th International Film Festival of India in Goa on 26 November 2024 and was released on 24 January 2025 on ZEE5.

== Plot ==
Radhe Mohan Sharma is an Indian Railways ticket examiner in New Delhi who lives with his primary-school-going kid, Manu. He has a passion for number-crunching and maintains accurate accounting in all walks of his daily life, whether in his transactions with the train platform vendors or his bank. In one incident, he is shown arguing and getting into a big tussle with his bank manager for not accurately crediting Indian rupee 27.50 by way of bank interest. Being a ticket examiner, he also has to hand over the daily collections to the office at the station each day, and he maintains accurate logs personally.

He develops an acquaintance with a frequent passenger called Poonam Subash Joshi. Poonam opens up to him and reveals that his spouse has died, while Radhe opens up to her and reveals that his spouse has just left him leaving him with his small kid. One of his passengers, by mistake leaves a file with him, which he keeps safe for returning later. His son accidentally spills milk on top of it. While attempting to clean, he could not help but notice a bank statement. His knack for numbers makes him spot a 'similar discrepancy' in that person's statement also. Later, he finds another such discrepancy with one of his friends and convinces the friend to file a complaint with the bank for the 'missing amount'.

Soon, he and his friend, on separate occasions, receive not only the missing tiny amount, but also a 'reward' of a color TV for their efforts. Although puzzled, he accepts the gift. The bank hopes that he will keep silent.

Brooding over what happened, he later realizes the gravity of what is happening. He figures out that by cheating lakhs of individuals of tiny amounts, each month repeatedly, the bank owners are systematically defrauding them and building a huge stockpile of illegal cash. He files a formal complaint at a police station against the bank.

In an interesting twist, the local Sub-inspector of police assigned to investigate the alleged financial crime happens to be P. Subash, the same woman Radhe got acquainted with during the train ride. But now, Poonam tries to show a clear professional distance between her and him, and Radhe understands and accepts that. In a second twist, it is revealed that P. Subash is the same girl Radhe turned down long years ago, when he was looking for a girl for an arranged marriage, due to his assessment that Poonam was weak in math(!). Radhe now believes that he cannot expect anything honest from Poonam.

Micky Mehta is later revealed as the corrupt owner of the bank, who is the mastermind behind this illegal scheme who keeps a huge stockpile of currency in a secret stash. Micky suddenly gets a call from the topmost official in the country about the missing amount, Ms. Ranganathan, who is now investigating the alleged crime. Micky Mehta angrily confronts his politician friend to try to have Radhe killed, but the politician advises against that as being too risky. He says there are simpler ways than that.

Micky starts giving trouble through the top Indian Railways officials and initiates an inquiry against Radhe for an alleged (fake) discrepancy of Indian rupee seventeen (INR 17) and starts to make his life miserable. He also manages to file false cases against Radhe for supposedly building his house in an illegal plot, and workers start bulldozing his home while he is still inside. Radhe and his son manage to escape, and Micky's goons catch him in the street, confront and insult him. Radhe is saved by the hundreds of poor people in simple professions, such as municipal cleaners, living in the neighborhood.

Radhe finds himself suddenly homeless. Radhe's explanations of the scandal now reach sanitary workers first and then all the common men. The news spreads like wildfire through simple means like Facebook, etc. Common men and women start withdrawing all their savings, immediately close their accounts, and then post their pictures on Social Media, saying that they just escaped the scandal! Fear spreads and soon there are mad stampedes in front of all the branches of the bank with people fighting to get into the branches to close their accounts. Riot-like situations spread nationwide due to Bank run. Meanwhile, taking Radhe by complete surprise, P. Subash generates an honest report about her findings and manages to release it to the Internet.

Micky Mehta tries to flee the country by a private jet with all INR 1500 crores, packed in multiple huge suitcases. But an equally secret plan hatched by the Radhe's municipal sanitary worker friends thwarts all of that, manages to outwit his gang, and capture all the cash. They secretly transport all the cash in a huge garbage truck out of Indira Gandhi International Airport and onto none other than the waiting top official investigating the crime, Ms. Ranganathan.

All of the public's money has been recovered by the Government. A smiling Radhe, the little boy Manu, and a happy Poonam are shown later strolling in a public park together again.

== Cast ==
- R. Madhavan as Radhe Mohan Sharma
- Neil Nitin Mukesh as Micky Mehta
- Kirti Kulhari as Inspector Poonam Subash Joshi
- Rashami Desai as Monalisa Yadav
- Shaunak Duggal as Mannu
- Himanshu Malik as Manoj Pathak (MP)
- Manu Rishi as Dayal
- Faisal Rashid as Tiwari
- Rajesh Jais as Bank manager
- Imran Hasnee as Shaleen Srivastava
- Ishtiyak Khan as Credit card seller
- Vineet Vashist as Airport Officer
- Yogesh Tripathi as Kumar
- Sukumar Tudu as Inspector Tiyagi
- Rohit Tiwari as SP Chandel
- Happy Ranjit as Officer Mishra
- Jyoti Negi as Kundu
- Melissa Pais as Roza Kutti

== Production ==
The film was shot in Delhi, including at railway stations, during the post-COVID period. Filming in busy public areas presented logistical challenges. Santhosh Thundiyil was the cinematographer, and the script was co-written by Ashwni Dhir and Ritesh Shastri.

== Reception ==
Hisaab Barabar had its world premiere at the 55th International Film Festival of India in Goa on 26 November 2024.

Saibal Chatterjee of NDTV gave the film two out of five, writing, "Hisaab Barabar vacillates between the mildly droll and the stodgily solemn. Despite all its additions and subtractions, it never finds a mean number that can make all the well-meaning effort worth it. Admittedly, certain moments in the film, thanks to their intrinsic relatability, are passable but these are too few and far between." Shubhra Gupta of The Indian Express gave the film 1.5 out of 5, writing, "An honest-to-a-fault, maths-whizz ticket collector gets embroiled, unwittingly, in the doings of a greedy banker: this one-line premise may have sounded exciting on paper, but the execution comes off contrived and clunky."
