= Gaurav Sharma (singer) =

Indian singer and composer

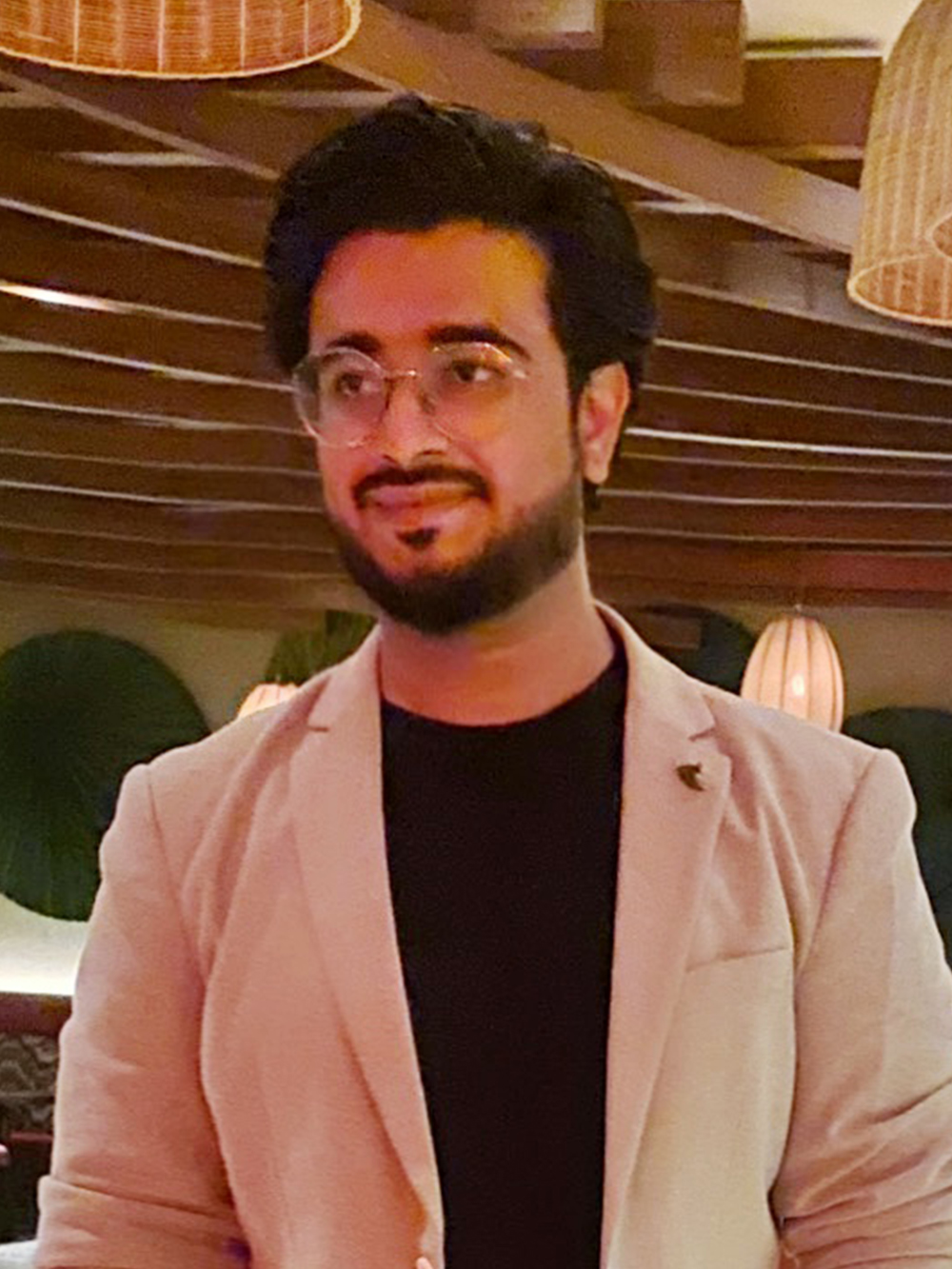
- Gaurav Sharma in 2022 at Delhi

Background information
- Born: 10 April 1992 (age 34); Delhi, India
- Genres: Indian Pop, Rock, Romantic, Folk, Classical, Sufi, Filmi, Patriotic
- Occupations: Singer, Composer, Songwriter, Actor, RJ
- Years active: 2017 – present
- Labels: Zee Music Company, Saregama, Cormeum Creations

Gaurav Sharma (born 10 April 1992) is an Indian singer and composer. He started his career as a RJ in All India Radio and later in 2017 his first album launched with Zee Music Company. Apart from his original compositions, he is recreating some old songs like Rimjhim Gire Sawaan, Gulabi Aakhein, Anamika, etc.

== Career ==
He started learning music since class 4. He started his career as a radio jockey in All India Radio where he was doing a radio show named Ek Khaas Mulaqaat Sitaron ke saath and interviewed some celebraties like Salman Khan, Hema Malini, Prem Chopra, Sharman Joshi, Udit Narayan, Suresh Wadkar, Abhijeet Bhattacharya, Kailash Kher, Shaan, Nawazuddin Siddiqui, Amrita Rao, etc.

In 2017 his first album Tu Pyar Hai Mera has been launched with Zee Music Company starring Bollywood actress Tara Alisha Berry. His another album with Zee Music has released in 2019 starring TV actress Mansi Srivastava. He has been training Tihar jail prisoners from several years.

In 2024, his song Humnava was released under Zee Music Company. It was sung by Gaurav and Kriti Sharma. Bollywood actress Amrita Prakash starred in this music video along with Gaurav.

== Discography ==
Year	Song	co-singer/co-actor	Music label	Note	Ref.
2017	Tu Pyar Hai Mera	Tara Alisha Berry	Zee Music Company	Debut	
2018	Kehna Hai		Cormeum Creations	recreator	
2018	Scary Jeans			TVC aired Over channels like ABP News, Zee news	
2019	Aashiqui		Zee Music Company	singer, actor, composer	
2019	Maula	Mansi Srivastava	Zee Music Company	singer, actor, lyricist, composer	
2020	Harega Nahi India	Mansi Srivastava, Gaurav Gera, Parull Chaudhry, Ridhiema Tiwari, Hunar Hale, Muskaan Kataria	Cormeum Creations	singer, composer	
2020	Rimjhim Gire Sawan	Ruma Sharma	Saregama	recreator	
2022	Bharat		Cormeum Creations	recreator	
2022	Gulabi Aankhein		Cormeum Creations		
2022	Anamika		Cormeum Creations		
2024	Humnava	Kriti Sharma (singer), Amrita Prakash (actor)	Zee Music Company	singer, actor, composer	
