= Mom Tane Nai Samjay =

2025 film directed by Dharmessh Mehta

- Official Poster
- Directed by: Dharmessh Mehta
- Written by: Radheshyam
- Produced by: Diya Nahar; Chee Teng Joo; Harit Desai (Co Producer)
- Starring: Rashami Desai; Amar Upadhyay
- Cinematography: Rahul Soni
- Edited by: Sanjay Sankla
- Music by: Sachin-Jigar
- Production companies: Mahaveer Jain Films; Scarlet Slate Studios; Bright Voyage Ltd; Text Step Services Pvt
- Distributed by: Rupam Entertainment Pvt Ltd
- Release date: 10 January 2025
- Running time: 117.00 minutes
- Country: India
- Language: Gujarati
- Box office: est. ₹4.6 crore

Mom Tane Nai Samjay is a 2025 Gujarati family drama directed by Dharmessh Mehta and written by Radheshyam. It stars Rashami Desai Amar Upadhyay and others . The film is produced by Diya Nahar, Chee Tang Joo and Co Produced by Harit Desai.

== Plot ==
Set in London, this emotional drama follows the life of Aashka and Kunal, a couple who strive to uphold Indian culture while raising their children. Aashka sacrifices her career to care for their growing family, focusing on their children Meera (alias Merry) and Kabir. As the children grow up, Meera embraces a modern lifestyle of late-night parties and multiple relationships, while Kabir pursues dreams of becoming a successful businessman. Meanwhile, Kunal becomes increasingly preoccupied with his business, leaving Aashka feeling neglected and undervalued. Tensions escalate when Aashka feels alienated from her family, prompting her to leave home. She finds solace with students who lack maternal love, transforming their chaotic household into a nurturing environment. As Aashka's absence reveals the vital role she played in their lives, Kunal and the children realize their mistake and seek to reconcile. Through heartfelt conversations, they acknowledge the irreplaceable value of a mother's love and support. Ultimately, the family learns to appreciate and respect Aashka's sacrifices, welcoming her back home with newfound understanding and appreciation for her unwavering dedication.

== Cast ==
- Rashami Desai as Aashka
- Amar Upadhyay as Kunal
- Virti Vaghani as Meera
- Namit Shah as Kabir
- Hemang Dave as Henil
- Tejal Vyas as Romi
- Yadit Acharya
- Aaryan Shah
- Kandarp Joshi
- Ddarsh Prajapati

== Soundtrack ==
Mom Tane Nai Samjay

Soundtrack album by Sachin–Jigar
- Released: 3 January 2025
- Genre: Feature film soundtrack
- Length: 7:34
- Language: Gujarati
- Label: Zee Music Gujarati

=== Tracklist ===
All lyrics are written by Bhargav Purohit; all music is composed by Sachin–Jigar.

Track listing
No.	Title	Lyrics	Music	Singer(s)	Length
1.	"Fariyaad"	Bhargav Purohit	Sachin–Jigar	Krishnakali Saha, Sachin–Jigar	3:33
2.	"Pankhi Ame"	Humayun Makrani	Sachin-Jigar	Maharshi Pandya, Sachin-Jigar	4:01
Total length:					07:34

== Production ==
The film was shot at various locations in London.

== Marketing and releases ==
The announcement of the release date and official poster appeared on 3 December 2024. The teaser of the film released on 10 December 2024, and the official trailer was released on 23 December 2024. The film was released on 10 January 2025. The film premiered on ShemarooMe on 24 July 2025.

== Reception ==
Kanksha Vasavada from The Times of India rated it 3.5 stars out of 5, calling it "a simple yet impactful film with strong performances." She praised the film's relatable storytelling, powerful dialogues, and emotional depth, particularly highlighting Rashami Desai's splendid performance as Aashka. While she noted the first half was slightly slow, the engaging second half and touching climax compensated, making it a heartfelt watch for families.

== See also ==
- List of Gujarati films of 2025
