= Guest iin London =

2017 film by Ashwini Dhir

- Theatrical poster
- Directed by: Ashwni Dhir
- Written by: Ashwni Dhir; Robin Bhatt
- Produced by: Kumar Mangat Pathak; Abhishek Pathak; Ahan Agarwal; Nishant Pitti
- Starring: Kartik Aaryan; Kriti Kharbanda; Paresh Rawal; Tanvi Azmi
- Cinematography: Sudhir K. Chaudhary
- Edited by: Manan Sagar
- Music by: Songs: Raghav Sachar; Amit Mishra; Background Score: Amar Mohile
- Production company: Panorama Studios
- Distributed by: Panorama Studios
- Release date: July 7, 2017
- Running time: 132 minutes
- Country: India
- Language: Hindi
- Box office: est. ₹10.64 crore (US$1.1 million)[domestic]

Guest iin London is a 2017 Indian Hindi-language comedy-drama film written and directed by Ashwni Dhir. It is a spiritual sequel to Atithi Tum Kab Jaoge? (2010). It stars Kartik Aaryan, Kriti Kharbanda, Paresh Rawal and Tanvi Azmi. The film is produced by Panorama Studios and co-produced by Nishant Pitti. The film revolves around Aryan Shergill (Kartik Aaryan) and his girlfriend Anaya Patel (Kriti Kharbanda), and their lives which take a turn when uninvited guests visit them in London. It was released worldwide on 7 July 2017, to negative reviews from critics.

== Plot ==
Aryan Shergill is a migrant worker in the UK, but his working visa expires. He resolves to arrange a sham marriage in order to obtain indefinite leave to remain, and ultimately British citizenship. He chooses Anaya (a taxi driver), promising to give her £7,000 in return. They conspire to have a fake marriage by lying to the court. Aryan takes Anaya to his home to make the court believe them. A few days later, Gangasharan and Guddi (Aryan’s uncle’s neighbour’s tenants) visit them, telling them that they are Aryan's relatives. He takes them home and makes Anaya somehow accept them for a few days. Chacha and Chachi ji get Aryan and Anaya married. On their marriage night, Aryan gets drunk and confesses his love to Anaya. Some days later, Anaya also tells him that she loves him, and things start smoothening somewhat.

Aryan then introduces Chacha ji to his boss. When Chacha ji subsequently visits Aryan's office, he accidentally turns on the filter, which is out of order, making the boss have a current shock. The next day, Aryan-Anaya and the guests are invited to his office party, where Chacha ji notices Aryan's boss harassing his secretary and stops him, for which Aryan loses his job. Shortly thereafter, the couple starts getting irritated by the visit of Chacha and Chachi and tries multiple methods to send them away. One day Aryan and Anaya spot something mysterious about them, seeing them lying about their whereabouts and visiting some other place and other person. They check their luggage and find old newspapers detailing the 9/11 attacks, which makes the two suspicious. So Aryan one day takes them to a cafe and leaves them there, and returns home. By then, Anaya gets a courier from neighbours, and they open to find that Chacha and Chachi ji came to collect their son's belongings. The couple visits their son's Ajay Gandotra boss, and they learn that he died in the 9/11 World Trade Center attack, and 100,000 pounds given in insurance was transferred by Chacha ji to Aryan's bank account. The couple feels guilty and starts searching for them. Chacha Ji and Chachi reach New York, where they reach Ground Zero, where after seeing Ajay's name on the memorial, Chachi burst down in tears. Finally, Aryan and Anaya meet them in New York and they apologies to each other. Finally Chachiji performs her prayers for deceased son who lost his life in the 9/11 attacks.

A few months later Chacha and Chachi ji visits them again, when Anaya is pregnant making the couple feel uncomfortable again.

== Cast ==
- Kartik Aaryan as Aryan Shergill
- Kriti Kharbanda as Anaya Patel Shergill
- Paresh Rawal as Gangasharan Gandotra / Chachaji, Ajay's father
- Sanjay Mishra as Habibi / Qureshi
- Tanvi Azmi as Guddi/Shazia Khan Gandotra, Ajay's mother
- Mohit Chhabra as Jassi
- Shafaq Naaz as Sherry, Anaya's friend
- Lucinda Nicholas as Terry, Anaya's friend
- Naveen Kaushik as Kit/Kaalia, Aryan's boss
- Vishwa S. Badola as Mr. Mehta
- Diljohn Singh as Manish Mehta, Mr. Mehta's grandson
- Nidhi Mathur as Pony Singh, neighbour

Special appearances

- Ajay Devgn as Ajay Gandotra
- Sharad Kelkar as Ashutosh; CODE Company Owner and Ajay's friend

== Production ==
=== Development ===
The film was officially announced in July 2016. The title of the film was said to be Atithii iin London.

=== Casting ===
The makers of the film initially finalized Lisa Haydon to cast in the film, though eventually Kirti Kharbanda was finalized for the role of Kartik's wife. Paresh Rawal and Tanvi Azmi have been confirmed to play as lead roles in the film. Shafaq Naaz, who played Kunti in Star Plus Mahabharat, will also be seen in this movie she will be seen as one of the friends of Kriti Kharbanda.

=== Filming ===
Principal photography of the film commenced on 1 October 2016. Film was shot in London and Birmingham, England also New York City, United States.

== Soundtrack ==
Guest Iin London

Soundtrack album by Raghav Sachar and Amit Mishra
- Released: 2 June 2017
- Genre: Feature film soundtrack
- Length: 23:54
- Language: Hindi
- Label: T-Series

The music is composed by Raghav Sachar and Amit Mishra while the lyrics have been penned by Kumaar, T.S. Jarnail, Navendu Tripathi, Amit Mishra and Saint Shah Hussain. The first song of the film Frankly Tu Sona Nachdi sung by Raghav Sachar and Tarannum Malik was released on 18 May 2017. The second song of the film titled as Dil Mera sung by Ash King, Prakriti Kakar and Shahid Mallya was released on 25 May 2017. The third single to be released was Daru Vich Pyaar which is a recreated version of the song itself from the 2001 film Tum Bin and sung by Taz and Arya Acharya was released on 30 May 2017. The soundtrack was released by T-Series on 2 June 2017 which includes 5 songs.

Track listing
| No. | Title | Lyrics | Music | Singer(s) | Length |
|---|---|---|---|---|---|
| 1. | "Frankly Tu Sona Nachdi" | Kumaar | Raghav Sachar | Raghav Sachar, Tarannum Malik | 3:50 |
| 2. | "Dil Mera" | Kumaar | Raghav Sachar | Ash King, Prakriti Kakar, Shahid Mallya | 4:32 |
| 3. | "Daru Vich Pyaar" | T.S. Jarnail | Raghav Sachar | Taz, Arya Acharya | 4:47 |
| 4. | "Guest iin London" | Navendu Tripathi, Amit Mishra | Amit Mishra | Navendu Tripathi, Amit Mishra | 3:27 |
| 5. | "Rabba Meray Haal Da Mehram" | Saint Shah Hussain | Amit Mishra | Sumeet Anand, Amit Mishra | 7:18 |
| Total length: | | | | | 23:54 |
