= Atithi Tum Kab Jaoge? =

2010 Indian film by Ashwni Dhir

Atithi Tum Kab Jaoge
- Theatrical release poster
- Directed by: Ashwni Dhir
- Screenplay by: Tushar Hiranandani; Robin Bhatt
- Story by: Ashwni Dhir
- Based on: Tum Kab Jaoge Atithi by Sharad Joshi
- Produced by: Amita Pathak
- Starring: Ajay Devgn; Paresh Rawal; Konkona Sen Sharma
- Cinematography: Aseem Bajaj
- Edited by: Dharmendra Sharma
- Music by: Songs: Amit Mishra; Pritam Chakraborty; Background Score: Sanjoy Chowdhury
- Production company: Wide Frame Films
- Distributed by: Warner Bros. Pictures
- Release date: 5 March 2010
- Running time: 115 minutes
- Country: India
- Language: Hindi
- Box office: ₹39 million

Atithi Tum Kab Jaoge? (transl. Dear Guest, When Will You Leave?) is a 2010 Indian Hindi-language comedy film directed by Ashwni Dhir, and produced by Amita Pathak. Loosely based on the short story Tum Kab Jaoge, Athithi? by Sharad Joshi, the film stars Ajay Devgn, Paresh Rawal and Konkona Sen Sharma. It was released on 5 March 2010. The film was a commercial success and earned more than double its budget. It received numerous nominations at Indian award ceremonies.

Indiagames also released a mobile video game based on the film.

== Plot ==
Puneet Bajpai (Ajay Devgn), a movie scriptwriter, lives with his Bengali interior-designer wife Munmun (Konkona Sensharma) and their six-year-old son Ayush in a high-rise apartment in Goregaon in Mumbai. Ayush repeatedly hopes for a guest to arrive at their home. The couple's happy life is upended when Lambodar Chacha (Paresh Rawal), a distant uncle of Puneet's, turns up unannounced one morning and slaps the guard, causing a commotion. Lambodar was searching for a son of his late cousin Putani (Puneet's father) and, finding Puneet, refers to him as Pappu—which he is not accustomed to—and proceeds to take over the couple's life by making unreasonable demands, gargling loudly early in the morning, eating heavily and farting loudly. The couple is at their wits' end before long, but Ayush is overjoyed.

Lambodar interferes in every aspect of their lives, from forcing the maid to quit her job after she is tired of being ordered around by him (much to Munmun's dismay), to incessantly trying to catch Puneet's attention, to bringing in strangers as newly formed friends he met on the way or calling him when he is not around. Others, however, are impressed by his display of devotion at the local temple, or his apparent ability to cure backaches by kicking the sufferer in their rear. A desperate Puneet, on one occasion, gets himself arrested so that he can complete his script without Lambodar's well-meant interference.

One day Puneet brings Lambodar to his film set, built on a grand scale and directed by the well-known Ranjeet Taneja. There, Lambodar requests an actor (Viju Khote)—Kaalia of Sholay fame—repeatedly to repeat his famous dialogue from that film (How many men were there? Two), much to the latter's vexation. A distraught Kaalia tries to escape Lambodar and reaches the set of a mansion, which is to be blown up on the count of two. However, an undeterred Lambodar once again asks Kaalia to say his dialogue, and on hearing the word 'two', the bomb operator blows up the mansion well before time, leading to an irate Taneja firing Puneet, who defends Lambodar when Taneja tries to insult him.

By this point, Puneet, now jobless, and Munmun are desperately hoping for Lambodar to leave, he had stayed for well over two months. They ask a friend acting in a TV serial to fake a relative's death so that Lambodar will depart, but the friend gets arrested instead after Lambodar sees through the hoax. On another occasion the couple has to go to Delhi; Munmun arranges for Lambodar's train tickets and pretends to be tearful when he leaves, but they later discover that Lambodar jumped off the train and returned to their flat. The couple books a hotel room one night along with Ayush, but Puneet is arrested when a police raid discovers him apparently 'molesting' Munmun. They then hire a don to send Lambodar back, but Lambodar instead takes him home, thus saving his life because he would otherwise have been shot by a rival gang.

Time passes and Puneet is accepted back into his job as Taneja apologizes when he realizes how brave Puneet was when he was defending his Chacha while he was mute as his wife was abusing his own father. Puneet also gets his repossessed car back from the bank on account of Chacha's friendship with an apparent nobody (who Puneet treats with disdain) who turns out to the manager of the bank. His kid also shines in his school thanks to the lessons taught by Chachaji earning the praise of the teachers. They eventually warm up to realize the value of having elders in the house.

On the occasion of Ganesh Chaturthi, during the immersion celebrations at Juhu beach, Lambodar goes missing in a stampede, and Puneet spends the night at a hospital hoping he was not killed. He returns home in the morning only to find Lambodar hale and hearty, and the couple begs for forgiveness as Lambodar is about to leave. At this point a second son of Putani's arrives — the actual Pappu — and asks Lambodar to stay at his home, apologising profusely for the confusion as his flat number was the same as Puneet's but in a different tower in the same housing society.

== Cast ==
- Ajay Devgn as Puneet Bajpai 'Pappu'
- Konkona Sen Sharma as Munmun Bajpai
- Paresh Rawal as Lambodar Singh Bajpai (Atithi)
- Bikramjeet Kanwarpal as Dhansukh Bhateja (Munmun's Boss)
- Sayyed Taziem (Mahib) as special guest
- Satish Kaushik as Ranjeet Taneja
- Sanjay Mishra as Building Watchman Shamsher Singh Rana
- Akhilendra Mishra as Suleiman Bhai / Ramu kaka
- Viju Khote as himself / Kaalia (Kitne Aadmi The)
- Mukesh Tiwari as Inspector Deshraj Awasthi
- Rohitash Gaud as Bank Manager Niranjan Tripathi
- Hrishikesh Joshi as Darshan Godbole
- Nataliya Kozhenova as Sonia
- Mac Mohan
- Satish Sharma as Punit "Pappu" Bajpai (Real)

== Production ==
The film was shot at Yashraj Studios, Filmistan, Film City and other locations in Mumbai. The makers bought the rights to the short story Tum Kab Jaoge, Athithi? by Sharad Joshi.

== Reception ==
The film received average to good ratings from the critics. Taran Adarsh from Bollywood Hungama rated it 3.5 out of 5, and claimed that the film was "fun" and "frolic" for all. Komal Nahta gave it 3/5 and explained how it should be acclaimed for its family love, and the great message at the end. [The Times of India] gave it 3.0 out of 5 and claimed that the film was Neat subtle and softly funny.

=== Box office ===
Atithi Tum Kab Jaoge had an "average" opening at the box office, and took about a 35% opening, which is a typical trend for films in the family comedy/drama genre. The collections picked up through good word of mouth and sustained well at the box office for eight weeks despite competition from other films and IPL cricket tournament held during the same time. The film worked well with family audiences The film did a domestic gross of ₹ 390 million. It was declared commercial success by Box Office India.

== Music ==
Atithi Tum Kab Jaoge?

Soundtrack album by Amit Mishra & Pritam Chakraborty
- Released: 20 February 2010
- Genre: Feature film soundtrack
- Length: 39:22
- Label: Junglee Music
- Producer: Amita Pathak

Pritam chronology
Toh Baat Pakki! (2009)	Atithi Tum Kab Jaoge? (2010)	Badmaash Company (2010)

Amit Mishra chronology
Atithi Tum Kab Jaoge? (2010)

The songs featured in the film are composed by Amit Mishra and Pritam Chakraborty while the lyrics are written by Irshad Kamil. The film score was composed by Sanjoy Chowdhury. The soundtrack was released on 20 February 2010. "Aaja Aaja" and its remix are composed by Pritam while the rest were by Amit Mishra.

Track	Singer(s)	Composer
"Atithi Tum Kab Jaoge"	Amit Mishra	Amit Mishra
"Jyoti Jalaile"	Sukhwinder Singh	Amit Mishra
"Aaja Aaja"	Raghuvir Yadav, Ajay Jhingran & Rajneesh	Pritam Chakraborty
"Dohe"	Amit Mishra	Amit Mishra
"Sukhakarta"	Amit Mishra	Amit Mishra
"Aaja Aaja (remix)"	Raghuvir Yadav, Ajay Jhingran & Rajneesh	Pritam Chakraborty

== Adaptation ==
Author and cartoonist Abid Surti has sued makers of Atithi Tum Kab Jaoge claiming that the story is directly lifted from his Gujarati novel Bauter Varas No Babo published in 1976, which was later translated in Hindi as Bahatar Saal Ka Baccha. He has filed a case with The Film Writers Association (FWA) and has demanded Rs 11.5 million as compensation, the case is still pending judgment.

== Awards and nominations ==
- Won: Apsara Award for Best Performance in a Comic Role – Paresh Rawal
- Nominated: Best Comedian – Paresh Rawal

== Sequel ==
A sequel to film titled Guest iin London was released on 7 July 2017.
