= Radhe (upcoming film) =

Indian Bhojpuri language film

- Directed by: Ritesh Thakur
- Written by: Indrajeet
- Produced by: Neha Shree
- Starring: Ravi Kishan; Arvind Akela "Kallu"; Neha Shree; Mohini Ghosh; Avtar Gill
- Cinematography: Yash Bhardwaj
- Edited by: Sanjay R. Das
- Music by: Ritesh Thakur; Lyricist: Fanindra Rao; Shyam Dehati; Rajesh Saranpuri; Arun Bihari; Shomdayal Sohra
- Production companies: Bikaji Present; Neha Shree Entertainment
- Distributed by: SRK Music
- Country: India
- Language: Bhojpuri

Radhe is an upcoming Indian Bhojpuri-language action drama film directed by Ritesh Thakur and produced by Neha Shree under his banner "Neha Shree Entertainment". Its stars Ravi Kishan and Arvind Akela 'Kallu' in the lead role and Neha Shree and Mohini Ghosh in an opposite role. Priyanka Pandit, Seema Singh, Avtar Gill, Pappu Yadav and others play supporting roles.

== Cast ==
- Ravi Kishan as Om
- Arvind Akela 'Kallu'
- Neha Shree
- Mohini Ghosh
- Priyanka Pandit
- Pappu Yadav
- Avtar Gill

== Production ==
Filming of this film was done in locations of Rajpipla in Gujarat.

The film is directed by Ritesh Thakur and produced by Neha Shree. The cinematography has been done by Yash Bhardwaj while choreography is by Rikki Gupta. Indrajeet is the writer, Sanjay R. Das is the editor, Hira Yadav is the action director and VFX is done by Sujit Chaudhary.

== Music ==
The soundtrack of "Radhe" was composed by Ritesh Thakur with lyrics written by Fanindra Rao, Shyam Dehati, Rajesh Saranpuri, Arun Bihari and Shomdayal Sohra. It is produced under the "SRK Music label".
