= Porobashinee =

- Porobashinee film poster
- Directed by: Swapan Ahmed
- Screenplay by: Swapan Ahmed,
- Story by: Swapan Ahmed
- Produced by: Reggae Entertainment & Tourism Ltd, Kazi Enayet Ullah, AKM Jamal Uddin
- Starring: Reeth Mazumder; Mamnun Hasan Emon; Sabyasachi Chakrabarty; Opshora Ali
- Cinematography: Subhankar Bhar, Alaul Baki, David Boerman, Rajesh Rathore,
- Edited by: Rabiranjan Maitra
- Music by: DJ AKS, Ibrar Tipu, Tanvir Tarek, Arif Rana, Binit Ranjan Maitra
- Release date: 5 May 2017
- Country: Bangladesh
- Language: Bengali

Porobashinee is a 2017 Bangladeshi science fiction film. It is the first science fiction film in Bangladesh. The film is directed by Swapan Ahmed and produced by Reggae Entertainment. Film shooting took place in France, Italy and Mumbai and was overseen by an international crew. The post-production involved 3D conversion and the application of visual effects.

== Plot ==
A Group of Bangladeshi Scientists discovers a planet "Aris-32" but a highly advanced & evolved human-like native alien species of Aris-32 gets the information of their planet being discovered and comes to Earth to stop the satellite technology of Earth, in order to blind the astronomers and space scientists. But the story gets more interesting when the lead alien of their mission, who's a female falls in love with a Bangladeshi human named Niloy. The aliens are exposed, and Niloy fights with all to save her.

== Cast ==
- Mamnun Hasan Emon
- Reeth Mazumder
- Sabyasachi Chakrabarty
- June Malia
- Opshora Ali
- Chashi Alam
- Urvashi Rautela as Special appearance in the song "Chalo Bhai"
- Shataf Figar as voice over artist "CIA OFFICER"
- Rajesh kr Chattopadhyay as voice over artist

== Soundtrack ==
The Music Was Composed By Ibrar Tipu, Binit, DJ AKS and Released by Reggae Entertainment.

Porobashinee

Soundtrack album by Ibrar Tipu Binit DJ AKS
- Released: 2017
- Recorded: 2017
- Genre: Soundtrack
- Length: 25:13
- Label: Reggae Entertainment
- Producer: Ibrar Tipu; Binit; DJ AKS

Track list
No.	Title	Lyrics	Music	Singer(s)	Length
1.	"Hajar Tara"	Farzana Boby	Ibrar Tipu	Ibrar Tipu	2:31
2.	"Mon Haralo Thikana"	Srijato	Binit	Rupankar	3:23
3.	"Chalo Bhai"	Srijato	Binit	Sukonnya	2:36
4.	"Tor Ei Shohore"	Swapan Ahmed	Dj AKS	Parvez	6:27
5.	"Tor Ei Shohore (Female)"	Swapan Ahmed	Dj AKS	Porshi	6:27
6.	"Chomok Baji"	Johnny Hoque	Dj AKS	Tishma	3:49
Total length:					25:13
