= Yeh Lamhe Judaai Ke =

- Poster
- Directed by: Birendra Nath Tiwari
- Screenplay by: Nagesh Bharadwaj
- Story by: Anirudh Tiwari
- Produced by: Ritesh G. Nayyar
- Starring: Shah Rukh Khan; Raveena Tandon; Mohnish Behl; Navneet Nishan
- Cinematography: Manish Bhatt; Masood Quereshi
- Edited by: K. Dilip
- Music by: Nikhil-Vinay
- Distributed by: R G Nayyar Films
- Release date: 9 April 2004
- Running time: 188 minutes
- Country: India
- Language: Hindi

Yeh Lamhe Judaai Ke (translation: "The Moments of Separation") is a 2004 Indian Hindi-language romantic mystery film directed by Birendra Nath Tiwari (in his directorial debut). The film stars Shah Rukh Khan, Raveena Tandon, Navneet Nishan, Divya Desai, Mohnish Behl and Kiran Kumar.

The film completed most of its filming in 1994 but was not released until 9 April 2004. It was an incomplete film whose production halted in 1994, but it was revived using different body doubles for scenes shot in 2004 to complete the film. It was panned by critics and audiences alike and was a box-office bomb.

== Plot ==
Jaya lives happily with her family. Her dad, Shekhar, is a big industrialist while her mother orders domestic help from behind the couch. She also has a feisty younger sister, Sheetal, who does her biddings. At her school, Jaya’s best friend is Dushyant, a musically gifted but unfortunately poor student. After learning that Dushyant is short on funds to buy an instrument, she asks her sister Sheetal to ask her father to help Dushyant out. Being a caring and a loving father, he obliges.

One late evening, the father receives an ominous phone call. His brother-in-law is very sick. Jaya’s mother hurriedly leaves for Delhi where her brother lives but en route dies when the plane explodes as they generally do when taking-off.

Ten years later in 2004, it is Professor Pyarelal's first day as the history professor at BA Nayyar Commerce Science College. He receives a notice for a picnic with the students on the coming Sunday, after which he engages in casual banter with his colleague, Professor Chand Nath. Raj is introduced as a side character.

We are now introduced to grown-up Jaya and Dushyant (JAADU) doing grown-up activities with their friends at a party. Deven Bhojani’s (Dushyant in Sarabhai vs Sarabhai) character starts a round of raunchy Antakshari. As the group of friends sing songs, we get to know Sujit (Jeet ka dusra naam) and Nisha.

The next day Jaya calls Sheetal who is studying abroad in BA Nayyar Commerce Science College. After the call, her very good friend Raj brings Dushyant’s newest album which they proceed to watch on TV.

In the next scene we find Jaya moping about, first to her butler then to Dushyant’s mentor, Rajpal, that Dushyant is busy and his assistant dont put him through. Dushyant and Jaya eventually break up off-screen.

We see a drunk and driving Dushyant crying. He sees a bunch of homeless people and finds Sujit amongst them. He promises to take care of him. Sujit in return takes him to Nisha’s new home where her father, Kamlesh, is celebrating his birthday. Nisha is delighted to learn that JAADU are no longer together.

Dushyant proposes to Nisha. Nisha and Sujit draw a wedge between Jaya and Dushyant. Nisha’s father Kamlesh brings a business proposal for Dushyant but is promptly dismissed by Rajpal. Nisha talks to Jaya’s body double over the phone and meets her off-screen. Nisha then tells Dushyant that Jaya is coming over to collect her money which Dushyant owes her for being the inspiration of all the songs he’s written. When Jaya arrives, Dushyant admonishes her and insultingly gives her the money. A heartbroken Jaya exits but Sujit takes the briefcase of money from her. Kamlesh calls some goons to off Jaya which they gladly oblige.

Jaya’s death is immediately taken to be a murder because of the testimony the police received that Jaya was happy going to dushyant’s place but sad when she left. She also had a briefcase in hand which was nowhere near her body at the time of the accident. The police gives this case to Inspector Rahul who immediately plans to go abroad to where Sheetal is studying, emotionally manipulate her by romancing her, and getting some clues on the affair between Jaya and Dushyant.

When Rahul arrives in the non-descript foreign country, accompanying him are two random people who aren't part of the investigation but listen in to all his planning. One is an effeminate caricature of a gay person and the other is a girl, Renee. He also has another officer, Balbir, working with him to do field work.

Meanwhile, Dushyant overhears Sujit and Nisha being evil and recounting the bad things they have done. Rahul has been spending a lot of time with Sheetal in a bid to get close to her much to the chagrin of Raj. Raj and Sheetal participate in their Annual Day function at college where Sheetal imagines Rahul as the other lead. This offers nothing to the overall plot and is just a subplot to make the movie longer. But this subplot is critically acclaimed for its ability to let viewers catch up on any lost sleep.

Sujit monologues about how he should kill Rajpal, Kamlesh, and Nisha in his pursuit of wealth and briefly breaks the fourth wall. In the next scene Nisha is strangled in her car. Dushyant arrives for a concert in the foreign country. Rahul and Balbir plan to meet him but he is busy so they talk to Rajpal instead where Rahul convinces Rajpal to include Rahul and Balbir in Dushyant’s next performance at the college.

This is followed by a conversation between Sujit and Kamlesh but we can't hear what is being said but both of them are angry and receive multiple phone calls that further infuriates both of them.

After learning the truth behind the wedge that Nisha and Sujit drove between him and Jaya, Dushyant asks Sujit to meet him the same place where they met when he was a destitute. In the next scene we see a drunk Sujit shouting “Jeet ka dusra naam sujit hai” in the middle of the road is run over by a car resembling the one Dushyant usually mopes in.

Rahul and Sheetal drive to the college for the performance and hope to meet Dushyant too. The show has been organised by the two random people accompanying Rahul from the start. However, we later learn that Dushyant has left for India the day prior as he fell sick.

Kamlesh is murdered next. Shekhar calls his daughter Sheetal to inform her and asks her to return to India as he is anxious about her safety. Rahul calls the Commissioner to confirm Kamlesh’s death and tells him that he has found some clues and knows who the murderer is. The Commissioner is stuck with the press asking such hard-hitting questions like “Jaya ke baad do aur raees logon ka murder hogaya aur police itni slow kyun hai action lene ke liye?’ (After Jaya two other elite people have been murdered and the police is still so slow to take action, why?)

Sheetal finally returns to her home and is met by her father. After greeting him, she goes into her home where she finds all the paraphernalia used in the murders such as masks, gloves, and the rope. She asks her father but he has no answers. At that exact moment the police barges in and arrests Shekhar for the murders. Shekhar confesses and says he wishes to commit one last murder of the real killer (metaphoric) of his daughter, Dushyant Kumar.

Meanwhile, Dushyant is meeting his mentor, Rajpal, who says he knows that Jaya and Dushyant’s love was true. Dushyant as he leaves thanks him for “Everything”. The End

== Cast ==
- Shah Rukh Khan as Dushyant Kumar
- Raveena Tandon as Jaya
- Mohnish Behl as Sujit
- Navneet Nishan as Nisha Dhingra
- Amit Kumar as Rahul
- Rashmi Desai as Sheetal
- Kiran Kumar as Rajpal
- Deepak Parashar as Shekhar
- Avtar Gill as Kamlesh Dhingra
- Deven Bhojani
- Asit Kumarr Modi (Joker)

== Production ==
Yeh Lamhe Judaai Ke was initially started in 1994 under the title Jaadoo with Shahrukh Khan and Raveena Tandon selected to portray lead roles. However, the film was stalled after shooting few scenes. The film was revived in 2004 with a different title and reshot the film with different actors altering the storyline completely.

== Soundtrack ==
Song	Singer
"Yeh Dil Hai Ya Sheesha"	Kumar Sanu
"Yaadein Teri Yaadein" (Sad)	Kumar Sanu
"Yaadein Teri Yaadein" (Happy)	Kumar Sanu
"Tera Naam Lene Ki"	Kumar Sanu, Sadhana Sargam
"Tum Paas Ho Jab Mere"	Kumar Sanu, Asha Bhosle
"Mere Dil Ko Kare Bekaboo"	Udit Narayan, Asha Bhosle
"Teriyan Mohabattan"	Asha Bhosle
"Ram Kasam Dilli Sarkar"	Shaan, Alka Yagnik

== Critical reception ==
Taran Adarsh of Bollywood Hungama gave the film 1 out of 5, writing, "Frankly, watching YEH LAMHE JUDAAI KE is akin to watching two films within one film. If the film begins with the SRK - Raveena track, the other track crops up from nowhere and that involves a bunch of newcomers, all non-actors."
