= Do Dil Bandhe Ek Dori Se =

Indian television series

- Genre: Drama; Romance
- Created by: Film Farm India
- Written by: Zama Habib; Ved Raj; Sudhir Kumar; Rishav Sharma
- Directed by: Hemanth Prabhu; Chander Behl
- Starring: Arhaan Behll; Mansi Srivastava
- Voices of: Javed Ali
- Theme music composer: Dony Hazarika
- Opening theme: "Do Dil Bandhe Ek Dori Se"
- Country of origin: India
- Original language: Hindi
- No. of seasons: 1
- No. of episodes: 257

Production
- Producers: Kalyan Guha; Rupali Guha
- Running time: 24 minutes Approx.
- Production company: Film Farm India

Original release
- Network: Zee TV
- Release: 12 August 2013 – 1 August 2014

Do Dil Bandhe Ek Dori Se (transl. Two Hearts Connected by One Thread) is an Indian Hindi-language drama television series that premiered on 12 August 2013. The show aired on Zee TV Monday through Friday nights. The show was musically treated by Dony Hazarika. It replaced Hitler Didi. it was replaced by Jamai Raja in its timeslot.

== Plot ==
The story revolves around a young woman named Shivani whose parents die in a plane crash. She is left in the care of her paternal grandfather, Daaju, who grows overprotective of her. Daaju believes that he can control Shivani's life and protect her from all harm. He wants to plan Shivani's future, including her wedding.

Raghu is Daaju's servant. Shivani calls Raghu a magician since he always fulfils her wishes. Daaju has arranged Shivani's marriage with her childhood sweetheart, Abimanyu, unaware of Abhimanyu's evil intentions. Abhimanyu wants to marry Shivani so that he can inherit Daaju's wealth and property. Once Shivani and Raghu find out about Abhimanyu's motives, they fake marrying each other to thwart Abhimanyu's plans.

Shivani gets a taste of the real world through their fake marriage raghu and shivani start to fall for each other, and realises that life is not as comfortable and beautiful as Daaju had exposed her to. Gradually, Raghu and Shivani grow to love one another despite many hurdles, and their marriage transforms into a real one.

== Cast ==
- Arhaan Behll as Raghu Seharia
- Mansi Srivastava as Shivani Rana / Shivani Raghu Seharia
- Yashashri Masurkar as Sumitra
- Alok Nath as Balwant Rana "Daaju", Shivani's Grandfather
- Vikas Sethi as Jaswant Rana
- Snigdha Pandey as Bela Seharia
- Rucha Gujarathi as Mahima Jaswant Rana
- Chaitanya Choudhury as Veerpratap Singh
- Shriya Jha as Madhavi Veerpratap Singh
- Anju Mahendru as Renuka
- Perneet Chauhan as Sumitra
- Ravi Bhatia as Vivek Seharia
- Bhanujeet Sudan as Rohit Seharia
- Ishrat Ali as Baburam
- Shubhangi Latkar as Lata Baburam Seharia
- Puru Chibber as Karan
- Poonampreet Bhatia as Maya
- Shalu Shreya as Ginni
- Akshat Gupta as Abhimanyu Sanghvi, Shivani's Boyfriend
- Pankaj Bhatia as Rupesh
- Charu Rohtagi as Panna Dai
- Vishal Thakkar as Sumitra's Fiance
- Ahmad Harhash as Sanjay Singh

=== Special appearance ===
- Akhil Mishra in Cameo
- Jay Bhanushali and Mahhi Vij
- Surbhi Tiwari
