= Bhoomige Bandha Bhagavantha =

Kannada language TV series

- Genre: Drama
- Story by: Zee Kannada; Dialogues; Rajesh C.A
- Directed by: Aroor Jagadeesh
- Starring: See below
- Music by: Singer; Shankar Mahadevan
- Composers: Music; Karthik Sharma; Lyricist; Raghavendra C.V; Sudheendra Bharadwaj
- Country of origin: India
- Original language: Kannada
- No. of episodes: 354

Production
- Executive producer: Raghavendra C.V
- Producer: Tandav Ram
- Production locations: Bengaluru, Karnataka, India
- Cinematography: Kantaraju Nidaghatta
- Camera setup: Multi-camera
- Running time: 22 minutes
- Production company: Tanadava Productions

Original release
- Network: Zee Kannada
- Release: 20 March 2023 – 4 August 2024

Related
- Neeli Chatri Waale

Bhoomige Bandha Bhagavantha ( transl. Lord Came To Earth) is an Indian Kannada language drama series airing on Zee Kannada which premiered from 20 March 2023. The show is an remake of Zee TV's series Neeli Chatri Waale. It stars Naveen Krishna, Karthik Samag and Kritika Ravindra.

== Plot ==
Shiv Prasad, a middle-class man stressed by personal and professional life, meets Lord Shiva in human form. Lord Shiva guides him through the dilemmas of his life.

== Cast ==
=== Main ===
- Naveen Krishna as Shiva Prasad : Girija's husband.
- Karthik Samag as Lord Shiva.
- Kritika Ravindra as Girija : Shiva Prasad's wife.

=== Recurring ===
- Umesh as Vishwanath : Shiv Prasad's father.
- Ankita Jayaram as Praneetha, Shiva Prasad and Girija's daughter.
- Anurag as Skanda : Shiva Prasad and Girija's Son.
- Bangalore Nagesh as Ananta Deshpande
- Shashi Deshpande as Vivek Deshpande
- D. Lingaraj as Moggu Suresh
- Gautami as Margaret
- Murali as Baskar
- Balu as Babu
- Rabindranath as Nagaraj
- Pawan Kumar as Ramaiah

== Soundtrack ==
Bhoomige Bandha Bhagawantha

Soundtrack album by Shankar Mahadevan
- Released: 2023
- Genre: Drama
- Length: 4:36
- Language: Kannada
- Label: Zee Kannada
- Director: Aroor Jagadeesh
- Compilers: Music; Karthik Sharma; Lyricist; Raghavendra C.V; Sudheendra Bhraradwaj

Tracklisting
No.	Title	Lyrics	Music	Length
1.	"Bhoomige Bandha Bhagawantha"	Raghavendra C.V; Sudheendra Bhraradwaj	Karthik Sharma
Total length:				4:36

== Controversy ==
In one episode of the series, there was a scene where pro-Kannada activists insulted Man for not having his shop Board Name in Kannada. Following this scene, Kannadigas have expressed a great deal of anger on social media, even calling for a boycott of the show. The primary reason for this is the depiction of the pro-Kannada activists as goons in that particular scene.

After the public outcry over this scene in the series, the director Aruru Jagadish and the lead actor Naveen Krishna shared an apology video on their social media platforms.

== Adaptations ==
Language	Title	Original release	Network(s)	Last aired	Notes
Hindi	Neeli Chatri Waale नीली छतरी वाले	20 August 2014	Zee TV	14 August 2016	Original
Kannada	Bhoomige Bandha Bhagavantha ಭೂಮಿಗೆ ಬಂದ ಭಗವಂತ	20 March 2023	Zee Kannada	Ongoing	Remake
Bengali	Sriman Bhagoban Das শ্রীমান ভগবান দাস	25 August 2025	Zee Bangla Sonar	Ongoing	Remake
