= Neeli Chatri Waale =

Indian television series

- Genre: Comedy
- Written by: Ashwani Dhir; Nitin Keswani; Rajat Vyas
- Directed by: Rrahul Mevawala
- Starring: Yashpal Sharma; Rajesh Kumar; Himanshu Soni; Disha Savla; Mithilesh Chaturvedi
- Music by: Abhijeet Hegdepatil
- Country of origin: India
- Original language: Hindi
- No. of episodes: 156

Production
- Producer: Ashwni Dhir
- Running time: 43 minutes
- Production company: Garima Productions

Original release
- Network: Zee TV
- Release: 30 August 2014 – 14 August 2016

Neeli Chatri Waale is an Indian television program produced by Ashwni Dhir and broadcast on Zee TV. The show is based on a Tamil story Kadavulum Kandhasami Pillaiyum by Pudhumaipithan.

== Plot ==
The series based on Kanpur follows a common man named Bhagwan Das who is torn between his personal and professional life. He is bullied by his boss, wife, and father, and his children are ashamed of his profession as an underwear salesman. Bhagwan Das meets Shivaye, a human representation of the Hindu god Shiva. Shivaye, whom only Bhagwan Das can see, guides Bhagwan Das through various dilemmas.

== Cast ==
- Himanshu Soni as lord Shiva / Shivaye - Bhagwan Das's friend, Parvati's husband(2014-2016)
- Yashpal Sharma as Bhagwan Das Chaubey - Aatmaram's son, Bobby's husband, Babli and Babloo's father, Gowardhan's brother in law. (2014-2015)
  - Rajesh Kumar as Bhagwan Das Chaubey. Kumar replaced Sharma in 2015.(2015-2016)
- Disha Savla as Bobby Chaubey - Baby's sister, Bhagwan Das's wife, Aatmaram's daughter in law, Babli and Babloo's mother, Gowardhan's sister in law.(2014-2016)
- Mithilesh Chaturvedi as Aatmaram Chaubey - Bhagwan Das's father, Bobby's father in law, Babli and Babloo's grandfather.(2014-2016)
- Aayan Khan as Babloo Chaubey - Bhagwan Das and Bobby's son, Babli's younger brother, Aatmaram's grandson, Gowardhan's nephew.(2014-2016)
- Prerna Gautam as Babli Chaubey - Bhagwan Das and Bobby's daughter, Babloo's elder sister, Aatmaram's granddaughter.(2014-2016)
- Sanjay Chaudhary as Batuk Laal
- Anup Upadhyay as SI Gowardhan Dubey - Baby's husband, Bhagwan Das's brother in law, Babli and Babloo's uncle.(2014-2016)
- Melissa Pais as Baby Dubey - Bobby's elder sister, Gowardhan's wife, Bhagwan Das 's sister in law, Babli and Babloo's aunt.(2014-2016)
- Shahbaz Khan as Mahadev Singh
- Salim Zaidi as Mishra Ji
- Nivedita Tiwari /Mansi Srivastava as Goddess Parvati
- Soma Rathod as Mishrain (neighbour)/Premlata - Mishrain's mother (2014-2016)
- Tarun Khanna as Rocky (wrestler)
- Ishteyak Arif Khan as Mirza Ji
- Cinderella Dcruz as Babloo's Teacher
- Kundan Kumar as Mithailal
- Bikramjeet Kanwarpal as Kaalia: Bhagwan Das's boss.
- Ami Trivedi as Lakshmi
- Rajeev Mehta as Gajju
- Samiksha Bhatnagar as Various characters

== Adaptations ==
Language	Title	Original release	Network(s)	Last aired	Notes
Kannada	Bhoomige Bandha Bhagavantha ಭೂಮಿಗೆ ಬಂದ ಭಗವಂತ	20 March 2023	Zee Kannada	4 August 2024	Remake
Bengali	Sriman Bhagoban Das শ্রীমান ভগবান দাস	25 August 2025	Zee Bangla Sonar	3 January 2026	Remake
