= Ratri Ke Yatri (TV series) =

Indian drama web series

- Genre: Drama; Procedural drama
- Screenplay by: Tanay Karnesh
- Directed by: Deepak Thakur; Anil V. Kumar
- Starring: Shakti Arora; Adaa Khan; Rashami Desai; Antara Biswas; Barkha Bisht Sengupta; Anju Mahendru; Shefali Jariwala; Shiny Doshi; Sharad Malhotra; Priyal Gor.
- Country of origin: India
- Original language: Hindi
- No. of seasons: 2
- No. of episodes: 10

Production
- Production location: India
- Camera setup: Multi-camera
- Production company: Hungama Digital Media Entertainment

Original release
- Network: Hungama Digital Media Entertainment
- Release: 21 July 2020 – present

Ratri Ke Yatri (English: Night traveler) is an Indian Hindi-language drama web series directed by Deepak Thakur for Hungama Digital Media Entertainment original. Monalisa cast in both season.

The series stars Shakti Arora, Adaa Khan, Rashami Desai, Antara Biswas, Mansi Srivastava, Barkha Bisht Sengupta, Anju Mahendru, Shefali Jariwala, Shiny Doshi, Sharad Malhotra, and Priyal Gor in key roles. Its first season was made available for streaming on OTT platform Hungama Digital Media Entertainment and his partner networks from 23 July 2020.

The second season of the series was released on Hungma Play on 10 Oct, 2022.
