= Jahangir National University =

- Directed by: Vinay Sharma
- Story by: Vinay Sharma
- Produced by: Pratima Datta
- Starring: Siddharth Bodke; Urvashi Rautela; Rashami Desai; Ravi Kishan; Piyush Mishra
- Cinematography: Parth Navle
- Edited by: Sanjay Sankla
- Music by: Aehmad Najeem, Vijay Verma; Saaransh Maide
- Production company: Mahakaal Movies Pvt. Ltd
- Release date: 21 June 2024
- Running time: 152 minutes
- Country: India
- Language: Hindi

Jahangir National University is a 2024 Indian Hindi-language political drama film directed by Vinay Sharma and produced by Pratima Datta under the banner of Mahakaal Movies Pvt. Ltd. The film stars Siddharth Bodke and Urvashi Rautela as lead characters.

The film's poster and its tagline "Can one educational university bring down the nation?" have been subject to controversy. It was released in theaters on 21 June 2024. It has been described as a propaganda and criticised for its editing and screenplay.

== Background ==
The university in the film is fictional but its name is similar to that of Jahangirnagar University (Bangladesh) and evokes above all JNU in Delhi, although whether the film is based on real events related to this institution (JNU 2016 sedition controversy, JNU attack) remains unclear so far.

== Cast ==
- Siddharth Bodke as Saurabh Sharma
- Urvashi Rautela as Richa Sharma
- Rashami Desai as Yuvedita Menon
- Ravi Kishan as Ramkishan
- Vijay Raaz as Ravindra Tokash
- Piyush Mishra as Guru Ji
- Sonnalli Seygall as Jahanvi Ojha
- Atul Pandey as Krishna Kumar
- Kunj Anand as Baba (Akhilesh Pathak)
- Shivjyoti Rajput as Saira Rashid
- Priya Bakshi as Prajita D Raja
- Umar Sharif as Amar (Omar Malik)
- Jeniffer Piccinato as Nyra
- Savant Singh Premi as Tatli
- Ashok Kumar Beniwal as Bhasker
- Siddharth Bharadwaj as Prof. Anjum Shakeel
- Geetika Mehandru as Vasudha

== Release ==
The film's release had been announced for April 5, 2024 but later postponed. The film was then scheduled to release on 21 June 2024.

== Reception ==
Sujay B M, writing for the Deccan Herald, gave this movie a rating of 1/5 and added that the movie relies on "the right-wing perspective" and that "the bad editing and poor screenplay add to the mess".

Abhishek Srivastava, writing for the Times of India, gave it a rating of 2/5 and described the movie as "a drag and tedious experience, lacking depth and soul".
