= Ravi Kishan =

Indian actor and politician (born 1969)

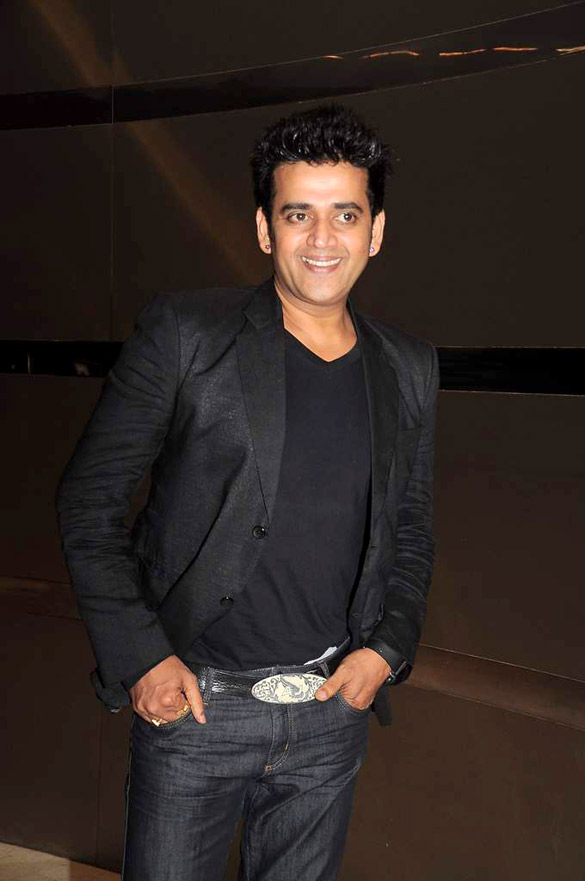
- Kishan in 2023
- Born: Ravindra Shyamnarayan Shukla; 17 July 1969 (age 57); Bombay, Maharashtra, India
- Occupations: Actor; politician; film producer; television personality
- Years active: 1992–present
- Spouse: Preeti Shukla (m. 1993)
- Children: 4

Member of Parliament, Lok Sabha
- Incumbent
- Assumed office 23 May 2019
- Preceded by: Praveen Kumar Nishad
- Constituency: Gorakhpur, Uttar Pradesh

Personal details
- Party: Bharatiya Janata Party (since 2017)
- Other political affiliations: Indian National Congress (2014–2017)

Ravindra Kishan Shukla (born 17 July 1969), popularly known as Ravi Kishan, is an Indian actor, politician, film producer and television personality. He currently serves as Member of Parliament, Lok Sabha from Gorakhpur since 2019. He received a Sansad Ratna award in 2025 for his performance in parliamentary duties. As an actor, Kishan has appeared in over 200 films, predominantly in Bhojpuri and Hindi cinema, as well as in multiple Telugu and Kannada language films.

Kishan appeared in several Hindi films in 1990s in supporting roles. Although he received attention from Tere Naam (2003). He then transitioned into Bhojpuri cinema, quickly got breakthrough as a leading man and propelled him to stardom in Bhojpuri region. In later years, he starred in several Hindi and Telugu films, including Phir Hera Pheri (2006), 1971 (2007) Luck (2009), Raavan (2010), Agent Vinod (2012), Bullet Raja (2013), Race Gurram (2014), Mukkabaaz (2017) and Batla House (2019), In 2006, he participated in Bigg Boss. Kishan won Filmfare Award for Best Supporting Actor and IIFA Award for Best Supporting Actor for the film Laapataa Ladies (2024).

== Early and personal life ==
Ravi Kishan was born on 17 July 1969 in Bombay, Maharashtra, India. He is the youngest of five siblings. He studied up to 12th at Rizvi College Bandra West, Mumbai. His family hails from Kerakat, Jaunpur district, Uttar Pradesh, where Kishan lived for about seven years.

Ravi Kishan married Priti Shukla on 10 December 1993, and they have four children, one son and three daughters. His daughter, Riva Kishan, made her film debut with Sab Kushal Mangal (2020). His other daughter, Ishita, who was an NCC cadet, joined the Indian Army in June 2023.

== Acting Career ==
In June 2008, Kishan was awarded the Most Popular Actor award at the ETV Bhojpuri Cinema Samman 2008 function. He has been part of reality shows such as Bigg Boss, Ek Se Badhkar Ek – Jalwe Sitaron Ke and Alliance. In 2008, he started co-hosting the celebrity dance-based reality show Bathroom Singer, Naman:Ek Sansani and Ek Se Badhkar Ek – Jalwe Sitaron Ke on Zee. Kishan also hosted the reality show Raaz Pichhle Janam Ka, on NDTV Imagine for two seasons. He worked with film directors Shyam Benegal and Mani Ratnam in 2010.

A film starring Kishan, Jala Debh Duniya Tohra Pyar Mein, produced by the American film company PUN Films, was shown in the India Pavilion at the Cannes Film Festival 2010. In 2011 he had a role in the film Shraddha In The Name Of God directed by Gurubhai Thakkar.

In 2013, Kishan was one of the judges on the reality TV show Sales Ka Bazigar, telecast on ETV. The show aimed to find the best salesperson in Uttar Pradesh and Uttarakhand. The top ten people who made it to the finales were to be employed by the presenter of the show Su-kam Power Systems. The winner would get a package of ten lakhs per annum, followed by the first runner-up winning a package of six lakhs per annum. This show was the first of its kind to find the best salesperson in India, and saw participation from over 10,000 people from regions across Uttar Pradesh and Uttarakhand.

Kishan made his Telugu cinema debut with the 2014 Telugu film Race Gurram. In 2017 he made his Kannada debut in Hebbuli and Tamil debut with Monisha En Monalisa in 1999. In 2018, he had a role in the film MLA.

=== Dubbing ===
In 2008, Kishan dubbed Tobey Maguire's role as Spider-Man in Spider-Man 3 into Bhojpuri. This is the first Hollywood blockbuster film to include a Bhojpuri voice dub, along with Hindi, Tamil, and Telugu dubs.

== Political career ==
Kishan joined Indian National Congress (INC) from Jaunpur constituency in Uttar Pradesh, and contested in the 2014 general elections where he secured only 42,759 votes or 4.25 per cent of the total votes and finished 6th. In February 2017, Kishan left the Indian National Congress (INC) and joined the BJP.

Ravi Kishan was named for Gorakhpur during 2019 General election by Bharatiya Janata Party . He contested the 2019 general elections against Samajwadi party candidate Rambhual Nishad in Gorakhpur constituency of Uttar Pradesh. Kishan, won against Rambhual Nishad by a lead of over 3,01,664 votes. Ravi Kishan polled 7,17,122 votes, while Rambhual Nishad polled 4,15,458 votes.

Ravi Kishan contested the 2024 general election and defeated his nearest rival Samajwadi party candidate Kajal Nishad by a margin of 1,03,526 votes.

== Controversies ==
In April 2024, a woman Aparna Thakur from Mumbai made a claim that she was married to Ravi Kishan during his struggle days, who had fathered her daughter, Shenova. The daughter Shenova also filed a civil suit in Mumbai requesting a DNA test and legal recognition. In response, Ravi Kishan's legal team and his wife, Preeti, filed an FIR against the mother and the daughter, making allegations of extortion as part of an underworld operation to ruin Kishan's reputation.

Kishan got involved in an alleged cheating case, where he allegedly was cheated by a Mumbai-based real estate builder Jitendra Ramesh Jain. As per Kishan, he had given an amount of Rs 3.25 crore to Ramesh as loan in 2012. When he asked for refund, the 12 cheques handed over as repayment bounced in 2021. In September 2022, Kishan filed the FIR in Cantt Police station in Gorakhpur.

He filed another FIR in May 2026 at Cantt Police station in Gorakhpur against individuals trying to tarnish his reputation. He has alleged "a coordinated defamatory campaign" aimed at damaging his public and political image. He has sought strict legal action against the miscreants, while asking for appropriate measures to stop these “malicious attempts”.

== Filmography ==
Key
†	Denotes films that have not yet been released

=== Hindi films ===
Year	Title	Role	Notes
1992	Pitambar		
1993	Aag Ka Toofan		
1993	Rani Aur Maharani		
1994	Zakhmi Dil	Abhimanyu	
1994	Aag Aur Chingari		
1994	Udhaar Ki Zindagi	Vasu	
1996	Laalchee		
1996	Aatank	Mahesh Kumar	
1996	Army	Kartar	
1997	Share Bazaar	Shekar	
1997	Koi Kisise Kum Nahin	Ravi	
1997	Agnee Morcha		
1998	Hamaara Faisla		
1998	Kudrat		
1998	Keemat	Mohan Tripathi	
1999	Aaya Toofan		
2000	Justice Chowdhary	Rahul	
2001	500 Ka Note		
2002	Marshal		
2002	Guru Mahaguru		
2003	Tere Naam	Rameshwar	
2004	Aan: Men at Work	Raghu Shetty	
2005	Raja Bhai Lagey Raho	Raja Bhai	
2005	Gehri Chaal		
2006	Phir Hera Pheri	Tiwari's sidekick	
2007	Deal – In Crime		
2007	1971	Captain Jacob	
2008	Welcome to Sajjanpur	Ram Kumar	
2009	Luck	Raghav Raghuvaran	
2009	Money Hai Toh Honey Hai	Parag Batra	
2009	Loot		
2010	Raavan	Mangal	
2010	Well Done Abba	Sub Engineer Vikas Jha	
2010	Na Ghar Ke Na Ghaat Ke	Madan Khachak	
2010	Kab Takk		
2011	Tanu Weds Manu	Raja's friend	
2011	Chitkabrey — The Shades of Grey	Rakesh Choubey	
2011	Shraddha In The Name Of God		
2011	Mohalla Assi	Kanni Guru	
2011	Man from Benaras		Multilingual film
2012	Aazaan	Pandey (RAW officer)	
2012	Jeena Hai Toh Thok Daal	Chandrabhan	
2012	Dangerous Ishq	Durgam Sah	
2012	Agent Vinod	Rajan	
2012	Chaalis Chauraasi	Shakti Chinappa	
2013	Bullet Raja	Sumer Yadav	
2013	Bajatey Raho	Mohanlal Sabbarwahl	
2013	Issaq	Teeta Singh (Tybalt)	
2013	Mere Dad Ki Maruti	Pathan	
2014	Mukka		Dubbed in Bhojpuri as Dusman Ke Khoon Paani Ha
2014	Zilla Ghaziabad	Rashid Ali	
2015	Second Hand Husband	Gurpreet's brother	
2015	Miss Tanakpur Haazir Ho	Bheema	
2015	Ranbanka	Raghav	
2016	Global Baba	Inspector Jacob	
2017	Lucknow Central	C.M.	
2017	Mukkabaaz	Sanjay Kumar	
2019	Bombairiya	Karan Kapoor	
2019	Marjaavaan	ACP Ravi Yadav	
2019	Batla House	Inspector Mohan Chand Sharma	
2021	Dehati Disco	Radhe	
2021	Urf Ghanta	God Shiva	
2022	Decent Boy	Udai Pratap Shahi	
2022	Subway	Baghi Bhan Singh	
2022	Love You Loktantra		
2022	Baap No Bagicho		
2023	Secrets of Love	Osho	
2023	Mission Raniganj	Bhola	
2024	Laapataa Ladies	Inspector Shyam Manohar	
2024	Jahangir National University	Ramkishan	
2024	Singham Again	Home Minister Raj Jaishankar	
2025	Son of Sardaar 2	Raja	
2026	Bhabiji Ghar Par Hain! Fun on the Run	Shanti Sharma	
2026	Maa Behen	Charitra Gupta	
2026	Dhamaal 4	Adhoora	
2026	Aryabhatt Ka Zero	Chhannu bhaiya	
2026	Mirzapur: The Film	Babban Babua	
2026	Suryaa: Ant Se Aarambh Tak		
2027	Naagzilla †		
2027	Khosla Ka Ghosla 2 †		
2027	Mera Yaar Bajrangi †		

=== Bhojpuri films ===
Year	Title	Role	Notes
2003	Saiyaan Hamar		
2004	Ganga Jaisan Mai Hamar		
2004	Pandit Ji Batai Na Biyah Kab Hoi		
2004	Kab Hoi Milanwa Hamar	Shankar	
2005	Dulha Milal Dildar		
2005	Hum To Ho Gayi Tohar		
2005	Kab Hoi Gawna Hamar		
2005	Raja		
2005	Mai Re Kar De Bidai Humar		
2005	Preet Na Jane Reet		
2006	Ab Ta Banja Sajanwa Hamaar		
2006	Banke Bihari M.L.A		
2006	Ganga		
2006	Gabbar Singh	Govardhan Singh aka Gabbar Singh	
2007	Janam Janam Ke Saath		
2008	Dharamveer		
2009	Ram Balram		
2009	Kanoon Hamra Mutthi Me		
2009	Rangbaaj Daroga		
2009	Bidai		
2009	Bhoomiputra		
2009	Khatailaal Mithai Laal		
2009	Bihari Mafia		
2009	Rangbaz Daroga		
2009	Chandu Ki Chameli		
2009	Dil Diwana Thakur		
2010	Balidaan		
2010	Satyamev Jayte		
2010	Mukti		
2010	Devra Bada Satawela	Ravi	
2010	Jala Deb Duniya Tohra Pyar Mein		
2010	Banaras Ke Babuaa Surat Ke Chhori		
2010	Ram Pur Ke Lakshman		
2010	Laharia Loota E Rajaji		
2011	Piywa Bada Satavela		
2011	Haamar Devdas		Bhojpuri version of Devdas
2011	Mallyuddh		
2011	Kehu Hamse Jeet Na Paye		
2011	Faulaad		
2011	Santan		
2011	Sajna Saath Na Chhute		
2012	Kaisan Piyawa Ke Charitarwa		
2012	Prem Vidrohi		
2012	Dhamaal Kaila Raja		
2012	Kaisan Piywa Ke Charittar Ba		
2013	Dhurandhar — The Shooter		
2014	Lakhon Me Ek Hammar Bhauji		
2015	Pandit Ji Batai Na Biyah Kab Hoi 2		
2016	Love Aur Rajneeti		
2016	Hum Hai Jodi No 1	Raja	
2017	Shahenshah		
2017	Kashi Amarnath	Amarnath	
2018	Bairi Kangana 2	Deva / Bhola	
2018	Sanki Daroga	Raghuraj Pratap Singh	
2021	Radhe	Om	
2021	Sabse Bada Champion	TBA	
2022	Mera Bharat Mahan	Selfie Singh	

=== Telugu films ===
Year	Title	Role	Notes
2014	Race Gurram	Maddali Siva Reddy	
2015	Kick 2	Solomon Singh Thakur	
2016	Supreme	Beeku	
2016	Okka Ammayi Thappa	Anwar	
2017	Radha	MLA Sujatha	
2017	LIE	Bharadwaj	
2018	MLA	MLA Gadappa	
2018	Saakshyam	Veeraswamy	
2019	N.T.R: Kathanayakudu	Ravikant Nagaich	
2019	Sye Raa Narasimha Reddy	Basi Reddy	
2019	90ML	Jayram (John Wick)	
2022	Hero	Saleem Bhai	
2025	Daaku Maharaaj	MLA Thrimurthulu Naidu	
2026	Peddi	Ranadheer Sisodia	

=== Other language films ===
Year	Title	Role	Language	Notes
1999	Monisha En Monalisa	Ravi	Tamil	
2011	Man from Benaras		English	
2014	Madhyamvarg: The Middle Class	Journalist	Marathi	
2017	Hebbuli	Amrut Shah	Kannada	
2017	Hameer	Veersingh/ Raghuveer	Gujarati	
2019	Sangathamizhan	Sanjay	Tamil	
2020	Drona	Uday Krishna	Kannada	
2020	Shivarjuna	Ramappa	Kannada	
2021	Roberrt	MLA Tripathi	Kannada	
2022	Baap No Bagicho		Gujarati	

=== Dubbing roles ===
Film title	Actor	Character	Dub language	Original language	Original year release	Dub year release	Notes
Spider-Man 3	Tobey Maguire	Peter Parker / Spider-Man	Bhojpuri	English	2007	2007	First ever Hollywood film to receive a Bhojpuri dub

=== Television ===
Year	Serial	Role	Notes
1999	Jai Hanuman	Krishna	
2000	Khauff	Raghuveer	Episodic role
2000	Vishnu Puran	Sudhanv	
2000	Zindagi Milke Bitayenge		Supporting role
2001	Suraag – The Clue	Dr. Shreekant	Episodic role
2001	Ek Tukdaa Chaand Kaa		Supporting role
2002	The Trap	Detective Raj	Lead role
2002–2003	Hello Inspector	Inspector Vijay	Lead role
2003	Yeh Hawayein	Shahid / Dr. Junaid	Lead role
2006	Raaz Ki Ek Baatt		Supporting role
2006–2007	Bigg Boss 1	Contestant	3rd place
2009–2010	Raaz Pichhle Janam Ka	Host	Seasons 1–2
2012	Jhalak Dikhhla Jaa 5	Contestant	10th Place
2014–2015	Box Cricket League 1	Player	
2016	Savdhaan India	Host	
2016	Bhabiji Ghar Par Hain!	Himself	Guest
2018	Agniphera	Himself	Guest
2020	Crime Stop	Host	
2022	Swarn Swar Bharat	Host	
2024–2025	Bigg Boss 18	Himself	

=== Web series ===
Year	Title	Role	Ref.
2018	Rangbaaz	Chandrabhan Singh	
2020	Hasmukh	Mr. Sinha	
2021	Matsya Kaand	Police officer	
2021	The Whistleblower	Jairaj Jatav	
2022	Khakee: The Bihar Chapter	Abhyuday Singh	
2024	Maamla Legal Hai	V. D. Tyagi	
2026	Psycho Saiyaan	Huntry Chauhan	
2026	Alliance	Contestant	
2026	Tax Department Story †	TBA	
