= Mansi Srivastava =

Indian actress

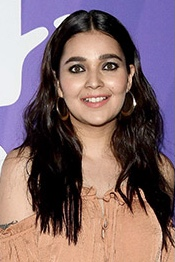
- Srivastava in 2020
- Born: 21 September 1990
- Occupation: Actress
- Years active: 2012–present
- Known for: Do Dil Bandhe Ek Dori Se; Sasural Simar Ka; Dil Boley Oberoi; Ishqbaaaz
- Spouse: Kapil Tejwani (m. 2022)

Mansi Srivastava (born 21 September 1990) is an Indian actress who primarily works in Hindi television. She is widely recognised for her portrayal of Bhavya Rathore Singh Oberoi in Ishqbaaaz and its spin-off series, Dil Boley Oberoi.

Srivastava made her acting debut in 2012 with Suvreen Guggal – Topper of The Year and had her first lead role as Shivani Rana Seharia in Do Dil Bandhe Ek Dori Se. She is also known for playing Prerna Bhardwarj in Sasural Simar Ka, Sonakshi Raichand in Kundali Bhagya and Dimpi Dalmiya in Saavi Ki Savaari. In 2020, she made her web debut with Ratri Ke Yatri and has appeared in the series, Swaanng.

== Early life ==
Srivastava was born on 21 September 1990, into a Hindu family, in Gurgaon, Haryana.

== Career ==
=== Debut and early roles (2012-2016) ===
Srivastava made her acting debut in 2012, playing Jasleen Guggal in Suvreen Guggal – Topper of The Year. In 2012, she also appeared as Payal Verma in an episode of Arjun. In 2013, she played Heer Singh Rathore in Rab Se Sohna Isshq opposite Anuj Thakur.

From 2013 to 2014, Srivastava played Shivani Rana Seharia, opposite Arhaan Behll in Do Dil Bandhe Ek Dori Se. The show became her breakthrough. In 2014, she played Goddess Parvati in Neeli Chatri Waale. In 2013 and 214, she also appeared in the films, Dreamz: The Movie and Man in Progress.

In 2015, Srivastava first played Shatabdi "Khushbu" Joshi in Peterson Hill and then appeared in an episode of Darr Sabko Lagta Hai. In 2016, she played Dr. Prerna Bhardwarj in Sasural Simar Ka opposite Manish Raisinghan. In the same yea, she appeared in an episode of Yeh Hai Aashiqui, Pyaar Tune Kya Kiya and MTV Big F.

=== Success with Ishqbaaaz (2017-2021) ===
In 2017, Srivastava played ACP Bhavya in Indian television's first spin-off series, Dil Boley Oberoi opposite Leenesh Mattoo. From 2017 to 2018, Srivastava played Bhavya Rathore Singh Oberoi opposite Leenesh Mattoo in Ishqbaaaz. The show proved to be a major success for her. In 2018, she played episodic roles in the shows, Fear Files: Darr Ki Sacchi Tasvirein and Laal Ishq.

In 2019, she played Lavanya in Divya Drishti. Later the year, she appeared in a short film Love By Chance, playing Meera. In 2020, she first played Mehak Verma in Vidya. Srivastava then made her web debut with Ratri Ke Yatri, playing Naina opposite Iqbal Khan.

From 2020 to 2021, she played Ahana in Ishq Mein Marjawan 2. In 2021, Srivastava played Sonakshi Raichand in Kundali Bhagya opposite Dheeraj Dhoopar. In the same year, she appeared in the short film Favourite Chai, playing Gayatri.

=== Recent work (2022-present) ===
Srivastava appeared in two web series in 2022. She first played Preeti in Swaanng and then played Riya Bajpai in The Prayag Raj. From 2022 to 2023, Srivastava played Dimpi Dalmiya in Saavi Ki Savaari opposite Pankaj Bhatia.

== Personal life ==
Srivastava and actor Mohit Abrol dated for six years and got engaged in 2016. The couple, however split-up after a few months.

Srivastava and photographer Kapil Tejwani were in a relationship since 2019. She married Tejwani on 22 January 2022, in a traditional Hindu wedding ceremony in Mumbai.

== In the media ==
In Times' 20 Most Desirable Women on TV, Srivastava was placed 19th in 2018.

== Filmography ==
=== Films ===
Year	Title	Role	Notes	Ref.
2013	Dreamz: The Movie	Zeena		
2014	Man in Progress	Gus's Girl	Short film	
2017	French Date	Promila	Short film	
2019	Love By Chance	Meera	Short film	
2021	Favourite Chai	Gayatri	Short film	

=== Television ===
Year	Title	Role	Notes	Ref.
2012–2013	Suvreen Guggal – Topper of The Year	Jasleen Guggal		
2012	Arjun	Payal Verma	Episode 5	
2013	Rab Se Sohna Isshq	Heer Singh Rathore		
2013–2014	Do Dil Bandhe Ek Dori Se	Shivani Rana Seharia		
2014	Neeli Chatri Waale	Parvati		
2015	Peterson Hill	Shatabdi "Khushbu" Joshi		
2015	Darr Sabko Lagta Hai	Aditi	Episode 16: "Nanny"	
2016	Sasural Simar Ka	Dr. Prerna Bhardwarj		
2016	Yeh Hai Aashiqui	Amrita	Episode: "Hostel"	
2016	Pyaar Tune Kya Kiya	Suhana	Season 8; Episode 6	
2016	MTV Big F	Dhaban / Ananya	Episode: "Dil Ye Ziddi Hai"	
2017	Dil Boley Oberoi	ACP Bhavya Rathore Singh Oberoi		
2017–2018	Ishqbaaaz	ACP Bhavya Rathore Singh Oberoi		
2018	Fear Files: Darr Ki Sacchi Tasvirein	Anika		
2018	Laal Ishq	Nitya	Episode: "Soul Transformation"	
2019	Divya Drishti	Lavanya		
2020	Vidya	Mehak Verma		
2020–2021	Ishq Mein Marjawan 2	Ahana		
2021	Kundali Bhagya	Sonakshi Raichand		
2022–2023	Saavi Ki Savaari	Dimpi Dalmiya		
2024	Main Hoon Saath Tere	Raina Bundela		
2026–present	Lakshmi Niwas	Revati Jaiswal		

=== Web series ===
Year	Title	Role	Notes	Ref.
2020	Ratri Ke Yatri	Naina	Episode: "Aakhri Raat"	
2022	Swaanng	Preeti		
2022	The Prayag Raj	Riya Bajpai		

=== Music videos ===
Year	Title	Singer	Ref.
2019	Maula	Gaurav Sharma	
