= Seeta Qasemi =

Afghan singer

Seeta Qasemie سیتا قاسمی
- Occupations: Singer; composer; TV presenter
- Years active: 2008–present
- Musical career
- Genres: Pop music; Afghan folkloric music
- Instrument: Vocals

Seeta Qasemie (Dari: سيتا قاسمى, romanized: Sītā Qāsimī, pronounced [siːˈtʰɑː qɑːsɪˈmiː]) is an Afghan singer-songwriter. She entered the Afghan music scene in 2008. She sings both in Pashto and Dari, and she currently resides in Germany due to the ongoing conflict in her home country.

== Early life ==
Seeta Qasemie wanted to be a footballer when growing up. Due to the civil war going on in Afghanistan, Seeta had to leave her country. Qasemie family moved to Pakistan where she stayed before marrying at the age of 25.

== Career ==
Seeta's career started by performing at small functions with renowned singers from the music scene such as Jawid Sharif and others. At one of these functions, Seeta met Valy Hedjasi who was a camera man. Valy had asked Seeta if she was interested in collaborating. Seeta composed, wrote and sang the songs "Bia Tu" and "Dilbare Mehrabanam". After this, Qasemie released her single "Ba Taswiram". Following this, Qasemie had established herself as an Afghan singer.

Seeta's first commercial success came with the song "Dokht Watan”, which was based on a love story between an Afghan nomad girl and boy. She followed this up with her next song "Mastam Mast".Qasemie’s collaboration with Shafiq Mureed was Seeta's first Pashto song and she was praised for her well versed accent and the video, Ta Sara Meena Larem. The song was shot inside Afghanistan, depicting a love story between an Afghan villager and an Afghan girl from the west who visits the village. Another collaboration followed with Shafiq Mureed, "Lamba Di Shoma". Seeta followed this up with a Pashto Na`at song and featured in Shafiq Mureed's 'Da Afghanistan' video clip alongside Mozhdah Jamalzadah. While Qasemie stayed in Afghanistan, she gave a series of concerts and interviews. Her next hit was the Hazaragi song 'Watandar'. On international woman's day Seeta released her song "Zan" (also known as "Ayena e Qad Nomaye Khurshid Manam").

Unlike many other music artists, Seeta made her television debut with a charity show. During the month of Ramadan, Seeta visited families in need with a camera crew to let them tell their personal stories and experiences. The show provided the families with assistance such as food and was aired on Khurshid.

== Discography ==
Song	?
Dilbare Mehrabanam with Valy Hedjasi (dari)	
Ba Taswiram Chi Mebini (dari)	
Eid Mubarak (dari)	
Yarake Bewafa (dari)	
Del Pareshanam (dari)	
Bewafaa (dari)	
Mohabbat (dari)	
Dukhtare Kochi (dari)	
Mastam Mast (dari)	
Ta Sara Meena Larem (pashto)	
Lamba Di Shoma (pashto)	
Naath (pashto)	
Chadare Ishq (dari)	
Watandar (dari)	
Zan - Ayena e Qad Nomaye Khurshid Manam - (dari)	
Ta latawem (pashto)	
Mowj (dari)	
Gharanay (pashto)	
Afghana yama afghana (international languages)	
Angoor e shamali (dari)	
Sarbaze watanam (dari)	
Ya mawla (dari)	
Benazom chashmaneta (dari)	
Elahi man namedanam (dari)	
Morghe delakim (dari)	
Jora janem (dari)	
Janam ba kade (dari)	
Bia hagha shan (pashto)	
Dokhte Watan (dari/pashto)	
Tirchhi Topi Wale (Hindi)	Remake Tridev
Sokot (dari)	
Namekasham (dari)	
Barigil (uzbeki)	
Namekasham degar jafae to ra (dari)	
O bacha (dari)	
Kabul jan (dari)	
Man Amada am (dari/Hindi)	
Man amadam with Indian singer (dari/Hindi)	
To bawar ba khoda kon (dari)	
Shireen goftar dari (dari)	
Qorban e wafayat (dari)	
Kop qaldi dilda armanim (uzbeki)	
Sanama sanama (dari)	
"Teri Chaahat"	
