= Urvashi Rautela =

Indian actress and model (born 1994)

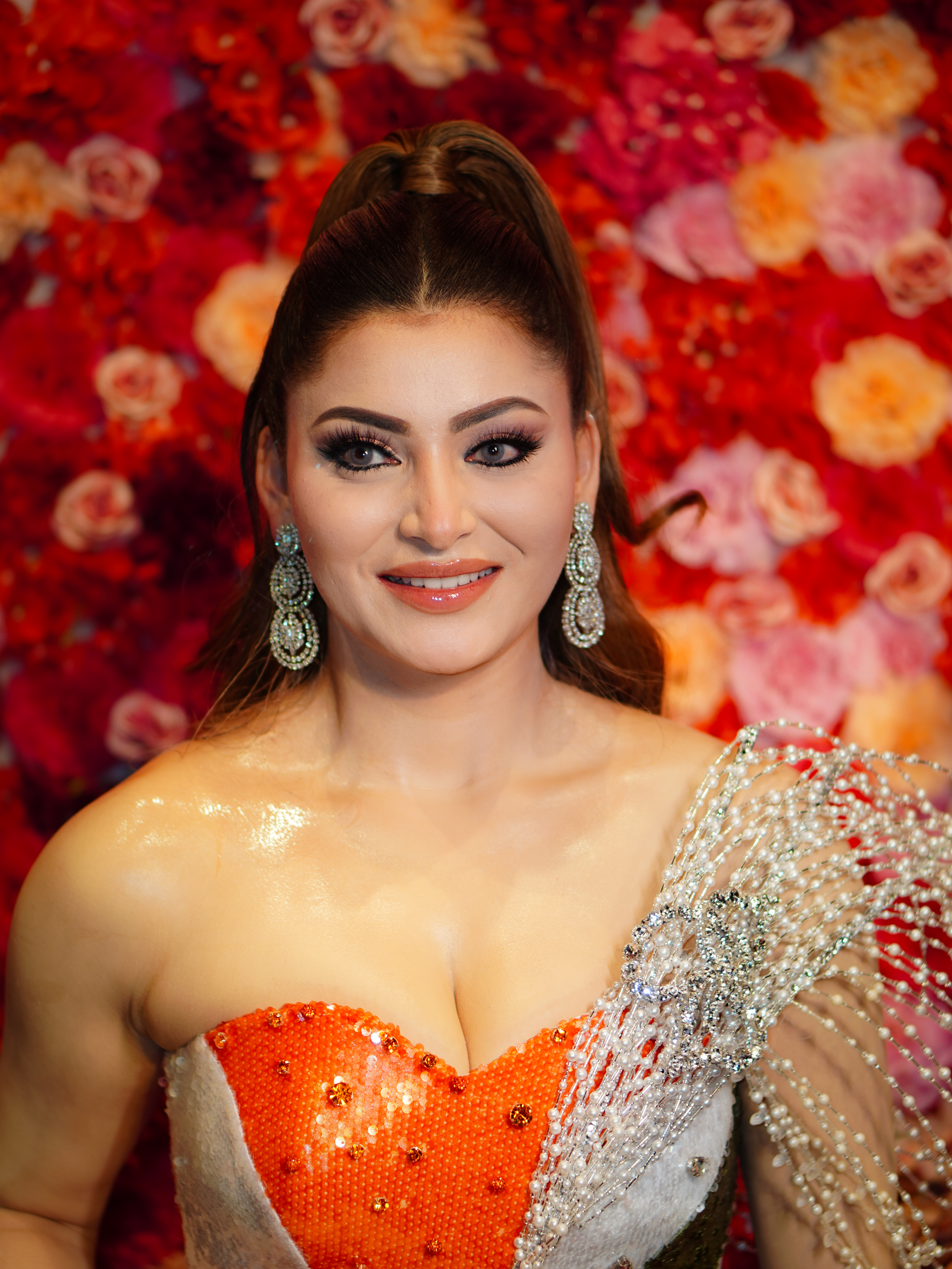
- Urvashi Rautela at Miss Universe India 2026
- Born: 25 February 1994 (age 32); Haridwar, Uttar Pradesh (present Uttarakhand), India
- Occupations: Actress; model
- Beauty pageant titleholder
- Title: Miss Diva 2015; Miss Tourism Queen Of The Year International 2011; Miss Teen India 2009
- Years active: 2013–present
- Major competitions: Miss Diva 2015 (Winner); Miss Universe 2015 (Unplaced); I Am She-Miss Universe India 2012 (Winner); Miss Tourism Queen Of The Year International 2011 (Winner); Indian Princess 2011 (Winner); Miss Asian Supermodel 2011 (Winner); Miss Teen India 2009 (Winner)

Urvashi Rautela (pronounced [ʊɾ.ʋə.ʃiː rɔː.teːlɑː]; born 25 February 1994) is an Indian actress, model and beauty pageant titleholder who predominantly works in Hindi films. She gained prominence after winning the title of Miss Diva- Miss Universe India 2015, and representing India at Miss Universe 2015. She began her modelling career at the age of 15 and also previously won the title of Miss Teen India 2009.

Rautela made her acting debut in 2013 with Singh Saab the Great (2013) and has since appeared in some notable films like Sanam Re (2016), Great Grand Masti (2016), Hate Story 4 (2018), Pagalpanti (2019), and Daaku Maharaaj (2025).

== Early life and education ==
Rautela was born on 25 February 1994, in a Rajput family in Haridwar, Uttar Pradesh (now in Uttarakhand) to Manwar Singh Rautela, a Garhwali and Meera Rautela, a Kumaoni.

Rautela was educated at St. Joseph's Convent School in Kotdwar. She is an alumna of Gargi College, Delhi.

== Pageantry career ==
=== Various pageants and fame (2009–2015) ===
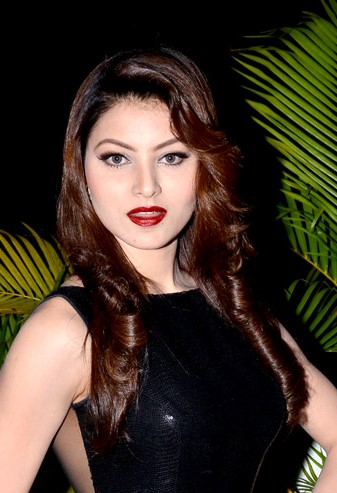
Rautela in 2014

Rautela's journey in the fashion industry began at the age of 15 when she got her first major break at Wills Lifestyle India Fashion Week. She also won the title of Miss Teen India 2009. As a teenage model, she walked the ramp as a showstopper for Lakme Fashion Week, Amazon Fashion Week, Bombay Fashion Week, and Dubai Fashion Week.

In 2011, Rautela won Indian Princess 2011 and Miss Asian Supermodel 2011. She also won the title of Miss Tourism Queen of the Year 2011 which took place in China, making her the first Indian woman to win this pageant. She was also offered Ishaqzaade but turned it down as she wanted to prioritise her focus on the Miss Universe pageant.

In 2012, Rautela won the coveted crown of I AM She – Miss Universe India along with the special award for Miss Photogenic. However, she had to relinquish her crown because she was underage at that time. In 2015, she participated in Indian pageantry once again and won the title. She represented India in Miss Universe 2015, however she did not place.

== Acting career ==
=== Debut and early career (2013–2017) ===
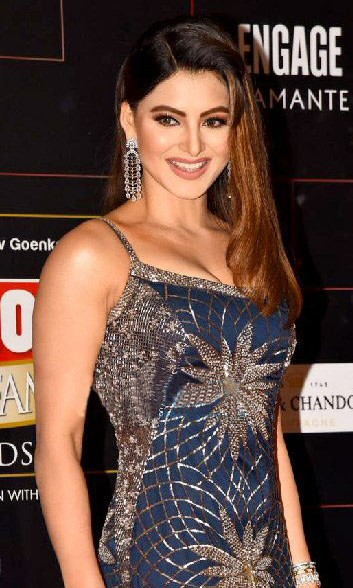
Rautela attending the Hello Hall of Fame Awards

Rautela made her Hindi film debut with the film Singh Saab The Great where she starred as the female lead opposite Sunny Deol. Following the release of the film, Urvashi appeared in Yo Yo Honey Singh's international video album Love Dose, which was released in October 2014.

Soon after, she ventured into the Kannada cinema and made her debut with the film Mr. Airavata. Although the film received negative reviews from critics, Urvashi's dance sequence was praised. Sunayana Suresh, writing for Times of India noted, "Urvashi is expressive and leaves her mark in the few scenes and songs she appears in, especially with her dancing."

Later, she appeared in two other Hindi films, Sanam Re and Great Grand Masti, both of which had average box office collections. She also featured in two music videos in 2016. Laal Dupatta with Mika Singh and Anupama Raag, and Gal Bann Gayi along with Vidyut Jammwal.

In 2017, Rautela starred in a special dance sequence Haseeno Ka Deewana in the film Kaabil. Her performance received compliments from Amitabh Bachchan Amitabh Bachchan. Apart from that, she made a special appearance in a Bangladeshi film Porobashinee.

=== Various roles and further career (2018–present) ===
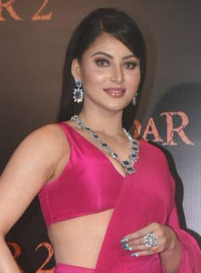
Rautela in 2023

In 2018, she appeared in the revenge drama Hate Story 4. Rachit Gupta of the Times of India commented on her performance, stating, "Urvashi Rautela has the main role and her character has plenty to offer. She starts off as a girl dancing in a strip club, but as the story unfolds, her character gets plenty of twists, turns and reveals. There's a lot on her table and the pretty actress handles the myriad emotions and shades with ease."

In February 2019, Rautela appeared in Anees Bazmee's comedy film Pagalpanti which received unfavorable reviews and was a box-office flop.

In 2020, she starred in Virgin Bhanupriya a comedy-drama directed by Ajay Lohan and produced by Shreyans Mahendra Dhariwal. The film was released on ZEE5 due to the COVID-19 pandemic. Rautela made her Tamil debut with the film The Legend, alongside Saravanan Arul. In 2023, she also featured in an item number in the Telugu film Waltair Veerayya, starring popular actors Chiranjeevi and Ravi Teja. In the same year, she made another special appearance in a song for the Telugu film Agent. She appeared in a song in Skanda (2023).

=== Upcoming films ===
Rautela completed shooting for the film Ghuspaithiya, which is a remake of the Tamil film Thiruttu Payale 2. She is also set to make her lead debut in Telugu films with Black Rose.

Rautela is set to make her Hollywood debut with a Netflix film tentatively titled Renata Fonte, alongside Michele Morrone. It will be directed by Barbara Bialowas and produced by Netflix and Tomasz Mandes. In March 2024, she posted a poster of the upcoming JNU: Jahangir National University

== In the media ==
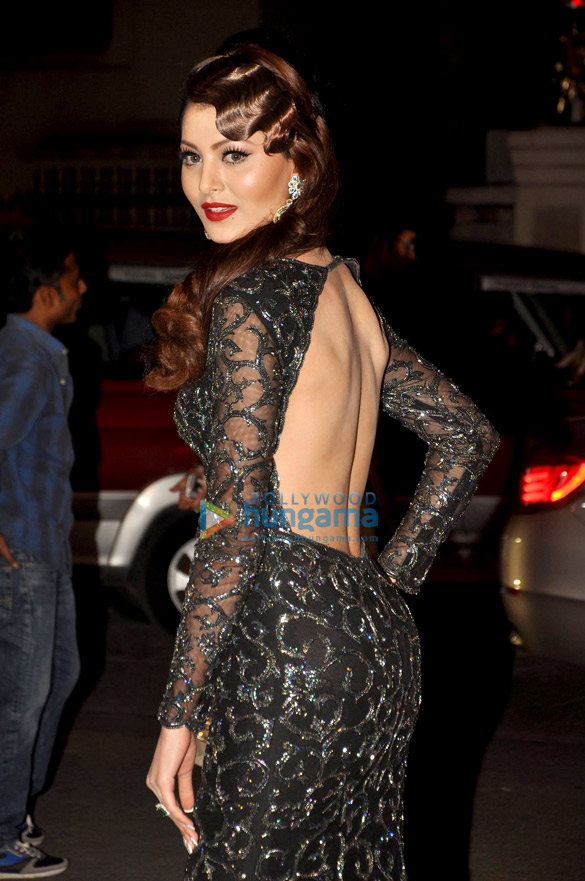
Rautela at the 60th Filmfare Awards

Rautela also launched her own app to provide fans with information about herself. In addition, she was honoured with the title of Youngest Most Beautiful Woman in the Universe 2018 by the government and tourism of Andaman and Nicobar Islands, and she received the Uttarakhand Maharatna Award from the Chief Minister of Uttarakhand.

On 24 October 2020, Rautela became the first Indian woman to walk the runway for the Emirati label Amato at the official calendar of the Arab Fashion Week, an event endorsed by the Dubai-based Arab Fashion Council. She was also awarded the Global Icon award at the Luxury Network International Awards 2022 held in Morocco.

=== Personality rights claim ===
In September 2026, a clip from an interview Rautela gave to the entertainment platform Bollywood.AI went viral on social media. In it, she was asked for her views on Bollywood and artificial intelligence, and said the industry was "suffering" with it. Many viewers found the answer confusing.

On 29 September 2026, Rautela's team said on Instagram that it was pursuing legal action against a Los Angeles-based artificial intelligence company. It alleged the company had used her name, images and videos without authorisation, and said damages were being assessed at ₹7,000 crore (US$730 million). The statement told the company to "keep Urvashi's name out of your business unless you have permission". It did not name the company, describe how the material had been used, or explain how the damages figure was reached. It was also unclear whether a lawsuit had been filed.

Sheeraz Hasan, founder and chief executive of Bollywood.AI and Hollywood.AI, responded on Instagram. He described the matter as a legal claim that followed his company's interview with Rautela, and dismissed it. He wrote "Urvashi, we didn't put those words in your mouth" and advised her to educate herself about artificial intelligence. He also described AI-generated films, vertical dramas and digital performers as the future of entertainment.

The claim was reported alongside objections from other Indian actors, including Salman Khan, to unauthorised AI use of their likenesses. Coverage also noted earlier orders by the Delhi and Bombay High Courts protecting celebrities' names and digital likenesses.

== Filmography ==
=== Films ===
Key
†	Denotes films that have not yet been released

Year	Title	Role	Language	Notes	Ref.
2013	Singh Saab the Great	Minnie	Hindi		
2015	Mr. Airavata	Priya	Kannada	Kannada debut	
2015	Bhaag Johnny	Herself	Hindi	Special appearance in the song "Daddy Mummy".	
2016	Sanam Re	Akanksha / Mrs. Pablo	Hindi		
2016	Great Grand Masti	Ragini / Shabri	Hindi		
2017	Kaabil	Herself	Hindi	Special appearance in the song "Haseeno Ka Deewana"	
2017	Porobashinee	Herself	Bengali	Special appearance in the song "Challobay"; Bangladeshi film	
2018	Hate Story 4	Tasha	Hindi		
2019	Pagalpanti	Kavya	Hindi		
2020	Virgin Bhanupriya	Bhanupriya Awasthi	Hindi		
2022	The Legend	Madhumitha	Tamil	Tamil debut	
2023	Waltair Veerayya	Herself	Telugu	Telugu debut; Special appearance in the song "Boss Party"	
2023	Agent	Herself	Telugu	Special appearance in the song "Wild Saala"	
2023	Bro	Sithra Manjari	Telugu	Special appearance in the song "My Dear Markendeya".	
2023	Skanda	Herself	Telugu	Special appearance in the song "Cult Mama"	
2024	Jahangir National University	Richa Sharma	Hindi		
2024	Ghuspaithiya	Abha	Hindi		
2025	Daaku Maharaaj	SI Janaki	Telugu		
2025	Jaat	Herself	Hindi	Special appearance in the song "Touch Kiya"	
2026	Welcome to the Jungle	Dia	Hindi		
TBA	Black Rose †	TBA	Telugu	Delayed	
TBA	Kasoor 2 †	TBA	Hindi		

=== Music videos ===
Year	Title	Singer(s)	Ref.
2014	Love Dose	Yo Yo Honey Singh	
2016	Laal Dupatta	Mika Singh and Anupama Raag	
2016	Gal Ban Gayi	Yo Yo Honey Singh, Meet Bros and Neha Kakkar	
2019	Bijli Ki Taar	Tony Kakkar	
2020	Ek Diamond Da Haar	Meet Bros	
2020	Woh Chaand Kaha Se Laogi	Vishal Mishra	
2021	Teri Load Ve	Singga	
2021	Ek Ladki Bheegi Bhaagi Si	Ajay Keswani	
2021	Doob Gaye	Guru Randhawa	
2021	Versace Baby	Mohamed Ramadan	
2023	Hum Toh Deewane	Yasser Desai	
2024	Vigdiyan Heeran	Yo Yo Honey Singh	
TBA	Untitled†	Jason Derulo	Filming

=== Television ===
Year	Title	Role	Notes	Ref.
2016	Sex Chat with Pappu & Papa	Herself	Episode 3	
2018–2019	The Dance Project	Dancer	Episode 2, 7	
2023	Inspector Avinash	Poonam Mishra		
2024	Call Me Bae	Diva Kapoor	Special appearance	

== Awards and nominations ==
Year	Award	Film	Category	Result	Ref.
2013	Screen Awards	Singh Saab The Great	Best Female Debut	Nominated	

Awards and achievements
Preceded by New Title	Reina Hispanoamericana India; 2022	Succeeded by Incumbent
Preceded by Noyonita Lodh	Miss Diva Universe; 2015	Succeeded by Roshmitha Harimurthy
