= Ashwni Dhir =

Indian filmmaker (born 1968)

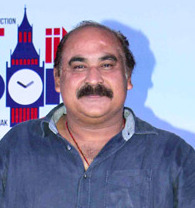
- Dhir during the press meet of the Bollywood film Guest Iin London in Mumbai in 2017
- Born: 23 September 1968 (age 57); Kanpur, Uttar Pradesh, India
- Occupations: Film director; screenwriter
- Years active: 2000–present

Ashwni Dhir (born 23 September 1968) is an Indian film director and screenwriter. He has written and produced various TV serials for the channel SAB TV. He has directed films such as One Two Three (2008), Atithi Tum Kab Jaoge? (2010), Son Of Sardaar (2012) and Guest Iin London (2017). He also produced the TV show Chidiya Ghar and wrote the show Office Office.

== Early life ==
Ashwni Dhir was born in Kanpur, Uttar Pradesh, into a Punjabi family. His father worked as a manager with Punjab National Bank, and Dhir completed his schooling at Christ Church College in Kanpur. He later graduated with a degree in Economics and subsequently studied journalism. From a young age, he developed an interest in Sufi music and in Hindi and Urdu literature, often spending his pocket money on books and recordings. Dhir has credited his early exposure to Hindi and Urdu poetry for shaping his literary sensibilities and his later decision to pursue writing for film and television. After watching films such as Ankush and Pratighat, he became convinced that cinema was a director’s medium. Although he was not selected for the direction course at the National School of Drama, he briefly worked as a medical representative before moving to Mumbai at the age of 21 to begin a career in the entertainment industry.

== Filmography ==
=== Films ===
Year	Film	Director	Writer	Notes
2008	One Two Three	Yes	Yes	
2008	U Me Aur Hum	No	Yes	
2008	Krazzy 4	No	Yes	
2008	Dhoom Dhadaka	No	Yes	
2010	Atithi Tum Kab Jaoge?	Yes	Yes	
2011	Chala Mussaddi... Office Office	No	Yes	
2012	Son of Sardaar	Yes	Yes	Also lyricst
2017	Guest iin London	Yes	Yes	Sequel to Atithi Tum Kab Jaoge?
2019	Appa Ani Bappa	No	Yes	Marathi film
2024	Hisaab Barabar	Yes	Yes	

=== Television ===
Year	Series	Director	Producer	Writer	Notes
2000–2003	Gharwali Uparwali	No	No	Yes	
2001	Office Office	No	No	Yes	
2000–2003	Public Hai Sab Janti Ha	No	No	Yes	
2005	LOC- Life Out of Control	No	No	Yes	
2009–2014	Lapataganj	No	Yes	Yes	
2010–2011	Jugadu Lal	No	Yes	No	
2011–2017	Chidiya Ghar	No	Yes	Yes	
2013	Hum Aapke Hain In Laws	No	No	Yes	
2014–2016	Neeli Chatri Waale	No	Yes	Yes	
2015	Peterson Hill	Yes	Yes	Yes	
2016–2017	Khatmal E Ishq	No	Yes	Yes	
2018	Har Shaakh Pe Ullu Baithaa Hai	Yes	Yes	Yes	
