= Prachi Bansal =

Indian actress (born 1995)

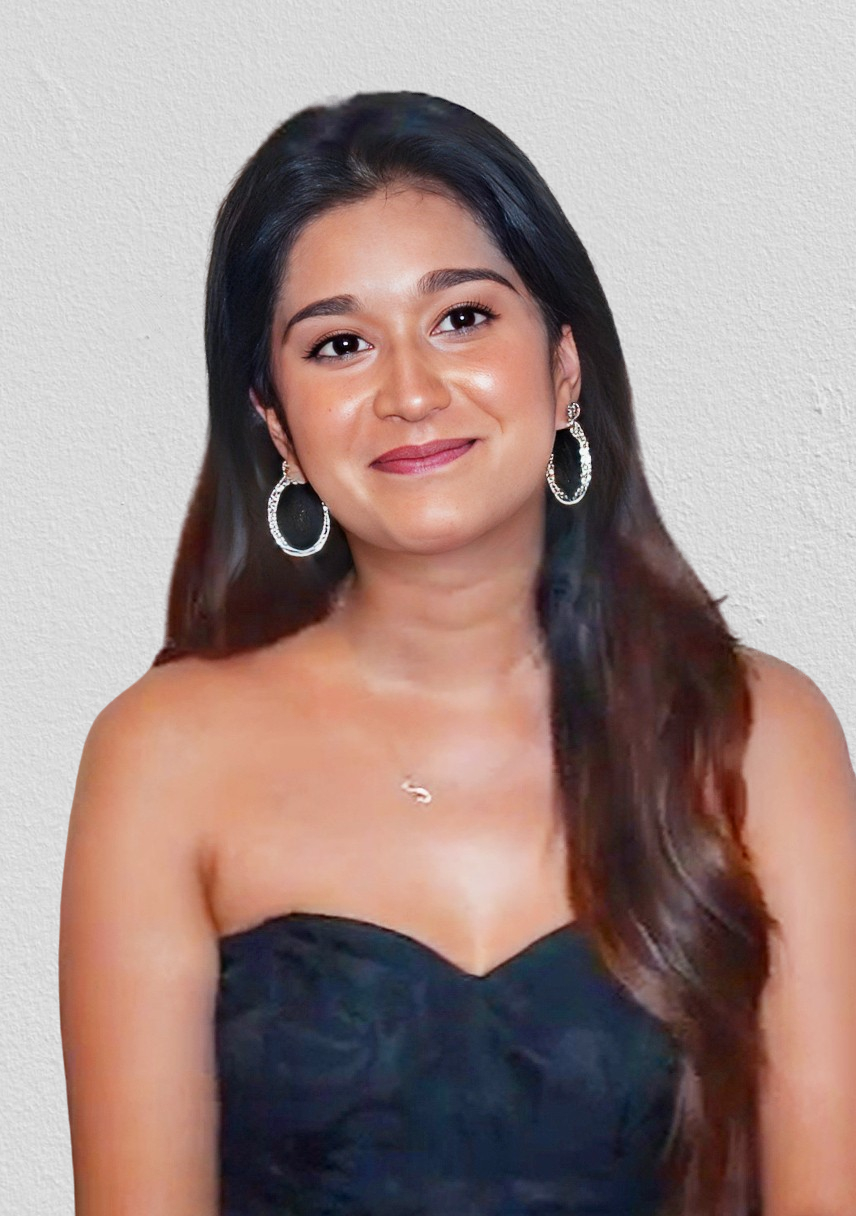
- Bansal in 2023
- Born: 19 March 1995 (age 31); Mumbai, Maharashtra, India
- Occupation: Actress
- Years active: 2017–present
- Known for: Thapki Pyar Ki 2 Shrimad Ramayan

Prachi Bansal (born 19 March 1995) is an Indian actress who works in Hindi television. She is best known for her portrayal of Vaani Agarwal Singhania in Thapki Pyar Ki 2 and Sita/Lakshmi in Shrimad Ramayan.

== Career ==
Bansal made her acting debut in 2017, with Bakula Bua Ka Bhoot, where she played a minor role. That same year, she made her film debut with Humein Haq Chahiye...Haq Se opposite Ankit Bhardwaj, playing a reporter.

In 2022, Bansal got her first lead role. She played Vaani "Thapki" Agarwal Singhania opposite Aakash Ahuja in Thapki Pyaar Ki 2. In 2023, Bansal played Goddess Ganga in Shiv Shakti – Tap Tyaag Tandav.

From January 2024 March 2025, Bansal is seen portraying Sita / Lakshmi in Shrimad Ramayan opposite Sujay Reu. The show marked a turning point in her career and gained her praises.

== Filmography ==
=== Films ===
Year	Title	Role	Notes	Ref.
2017	Humein Haq Chahiye...Haq Se	Reporter		
2024	The Lost Girl	Suhani	JioCinema film	

=== Television ===
Year	Title	Role	Notes	Ref.
2017	Bakula Bua Ka Bhoot	Unknown		
2022	Thapki Pyar Ki 2	Vaani "Thapki" Agarwal Singhania		
2023	Shiv Shakti – Tap Tyaag Tandav	Ganga		
2024–2025	Shrimad Ramayan	Sita / Lakshmi		

=== Music videos ===
Year	Title	Singer(s)	Ref.
2022	Banke Bihari	Divya Kumar	
2023	Raahi	Shahid Mallya, Antara Mitra, Bhoomi Trivedi, Jaan Kumar Sanu and 10 others	
