= Faltu (disambiguation) =

Faltu (lit. 'useless' in Indian languages) may refer to:

- Faltu, a 2006 Indian Bengali-language film
- F.A.L.T.U, a 2011 Indian Hindi-language film
- Faltu (TV series), a 2022 Indian television series
