= Jigyasa Singh =

Indian television actress (born 1994)

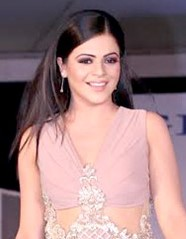
- Singh in 2021
- Born: 25 June 1994 (age 32); Dehradun, Uttarakhand, India
- Education: Delhi University
- Occupation: Actress
- Years active: 2014–present
- Known for: Thapki Pyar Ki; Dev 2 Nazar; Shakti – Astitva Ke Ehsaas Ki

Jigyasa Singh (born 25 June 1994) is an Indian television actress. She is known for her portrayal of Thapki in Thapki Pyar Ki, Thapki Pyar Ki 2 and Heer Singh in Shakti – Astitva Ke Ehsaas Ki.

== Early life and education ==
Singh was born in Dehradun, Uttarakhand. She did her schooling from Jaipur. She completed her master's degree in journalism from Delhi University.

== Career ==
Singh made her debut as Aliya Raheja with Zee Marudhara's Chorre Tera Gaon Bada Pyaara. Next, she appeared in Channel V India's episodic series Gumrah: End of Innocence as Supriya.

From May 2015 to July 2017, she portrayed Vaani "Thapki" Chaturvedi and Bani Malhotra in Colors TV's Thapki Pyar Ki. In 2018, Singh joined Colors TV's Dev 2 as Dhwani Karchiwala. In 2019, she played Tara Khanna in Star Plus's Nazar.

In January 2020, she began appearing as Heer Singh in Colors TV's Shakti – Astitva Ke Ehsaas Ki. She quit the show in August 2021 to reprise her role of Thapki in the spiritual sequel of Thapki Pyar Ki, entitled Thapki Pyar Ki 2, which is on air on Colors TV in October 2021. She quit the show in February 2022 owing to health issues. Since September 2026, she portrayed Nidhima Raje in DD National's Suraag 2.0 and marks her comeback after 4 years television hiatus.

== Filmography ==
=== Television ===
Year	Title	Role	Notes	Ref.
2014	Chorre Tera Gaon Bada Pyaara	Aliya Shroff		
2014	Gumrah	Supriya Shrestha	Season 4	
2015–2017	Thapki Pyar Ki	Vaani Bihaan Pandey aka Thapki		
2017	Thapki Pyar Ki	Baani Samar Kapoor		
2018	Dev 2	Dhwani Karchiwala		
2018	Laal Ishq	Paayal	Episode: "Shaitani Chehra"	
2019	Nazar	Tara Khanna		
2020–2021	Shakti – Astitva Ke Ehsaas Ki	Heer Singh		
2021–2022	Thapki Pyar Ki 2	Vaani Agarwal Singhania aka Thapki		
2026–present	Suraag 2.0	Nidhima Raje		

==== Special appearances ====
Year	Title	Role	Ref.
2015	Comedy Nights with Kapil	"Thapki" Chaturvedi	
2015	India's Got Talent	"Thapki" Chaturvedi	
2015	Jhalak Dikhhla Jaa 8	"Thapki" Chaturvedi	
2015	Udaan	"Thapki" Chaturvedi	
2015	Balika Vadhu	"Thapki" Chaturvedi	
2016	Bigg Boss 9	"Thapki" Chaturvedi	
2016	Comedy Nights Live	"Thapki" Chaturvedi	
2016	Ishq Ka Rang Safed	"Thapki" Chaturvedi	
2020	Vidya	Heer Singh	
2021	Udaariyaan	Vaani "Thapki" Agarwal	
2021	Sirf Tum	Vaani "Thapki" Agarwal	

=== Music videos ===
Year	Title	Singer	Ref.
2019	Ek Do Teen	Nikhita Gandhi	
2020	Main Hoon Woh Palak	Mohit Gaur	

== Awards and nominations ==
She was nominated for Best Debutante as Thapki in Zee Gold Awards 2016.

== See also ==
- List of Indian television actresses
