= Aryan Khan =

Indian filmmaker (born 1997)

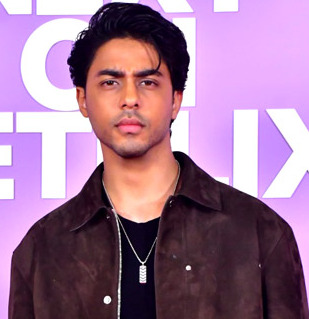
- Khan in 2025
- Born: 12 November 1997 (age 29); Mumbai, Maharashtra, India
- Education: University of Southern California (B.FA)
- Occupations: Entrepreneur; filmmaker; screenwriter
- Years active: 2022–present
- Organisation: SLAB Ventures
- Parents: Shah Rukh Khan (father); Gauri Khan (mother)
- Relatives: Suhana Khan (sister)

Aryan Khan (born 12 November 1997) is an Indian entrepreneur and filmmaker. After graduating from the University of Southern California, he co-founded the company SLAB Ventures in 2022, under which he launched a luxury lifestyle and beverage brand named D'YAVOL. He is the eldest son of Shah Rukh Khan and Gauri Khan.

== Early life and education ==
Aryan Khan was born on 13 November 1997 in Mumbai, Maharashtra, India. He is the eldest son of actor Shah Rukh Khan and producer Gauri Khan. He has two younger siblings, including actress Suhana. Khan was raised with both his parents' religions of Islam and Hinduism. He did his schooling from Mumbai's Dhirubhai Ambani International School until age 15, after which he moved to England to attend the Sevenoaks School in Kent.

As a child, Khan played the younger version of his father's character in one scene of the film Kabhi Khushi Kabhie Gham (2001). He has worked as a voice actor in the Hindi dub of The Incredibles (2004) alongside his father. In 2020, Khan graduated with a Bachelor of Fine Arts degree in film and television production from the USC School of Cinematic Arts at the University of Southern California. He was member of the Lambda Chi Alpha fraternity.

== Career ==
=== Voice acting and filmmaking ===
Khan voiced Simba in the Hindi dub of The Lion King (2019). Shah Rukh Khan, who voiced Mufasa in the Hindi dub, had to re-dub his lines because experts noted that his voice sounded too similar to his son's voice. Khan continued his voice work by dubbing Simba in the Hindi version of Mufasa: The Lion King (2024), joining his father and younger brother AbRam in the cast.

From 2023 to 2024, Khan filmed a streaming series, titled The Ba***ds of Bollywood, set against the backdrop of the Hindi film industry, on which he served as showrunner, writer, and director. Produced by his father and mother under Red Chillies Entertainment, it was released on Netflix on 18 September 2025. The series starred Lakshya Lalwani, Raghav Juyal, Bobby Deol and Sahher Bambba, and was co-written and co-created by Bilal Siddiqui and Manav Chauhan.

=== Business ===
In 2022, Khan and his business partners Bunty Singh and Leti Blagoeva launched the company SLAB Ventures, under which they began a luxury collective brand named D'YAVOL. They teamed with the brewing company Anheuser-Busch InBev to launch a super premium Vodka, which has now garnered more than 25 international awards within a short span. They launched a blended malt scotch, D'YAVOL Inception, the following year. Also in 2023, Khan launched a luxury apparel brand, named D'YAVOL X. He directed an advertisement video for the brand, featuring him and his father, which marked his first directorial venture. In August 2025, Khan partnered with Radico Khaitan, Shah Rukh Khan and Nikhil Kamath and announced a Tequila Anejo. A global launch is expected soon.

== Personal life ==
Khan has attracted media attention for his private life. Since 2024, several outlets have speculated about his relationship with Brazilian-origin actress and model Larissa Bonesi, describing her as his rumoured girlfriend. The speculation grew after she was spotted with him at public events and later promoted his directorial debut The Ba***ds of Bollywood (2025) on social media, which he reshared. Neither Khan nor Bonesi have confirmed the relationship publicly, and media references continue to use the term “rumoured.”

=== Controversies ===
On 3 October 2021, Khan was arrested along with six others by the Narcotics Control Bureau (NCB) during a raid on an alleged rave on a cruise ship. Khan was detained as part of an investigation into an alleged international drugs racket. After spending 25 days at the Mumbai Central Prison and being denied bail four times, he was granted bail on 28 October 2021. In May 2022, he was cleared of all charges. One of the officers leading the investigation, Sameer Wankhede, was later charged with corruption and extortion in connection with the case, with the Central Bureau of Investigation alleging that the drug charges were part of a false scheme to blackmail the Khan family.

On 28 November 2025, during a public event at a pub in Bengaluru, Khan was reportedly seen flashing his middle finger from a balcony toward fans and media gathered outside. The video of the moment quickly went viral. A formal complaint was filed by lawyer Owaiz Hussain S. with Bengaluru authorities, alleging that the gesture constituted an obscene act in a public place and insulted the modesty of women present during the event; he requested registration of an FIR. The local police have launched a suo motu investigation into the incident, reviewing CCTV footage from the pub and interviewing venue management before deciding if an FIR should be filed under relevant provisions. An acquaintance present at the event, actor Zaid Khan, claimed in public statements that the gesture was not directed at the crowd but was meant for Aryan's manager, arguing that the incident has been misunderstood and taken out of context.

== Filmography ==
=== As an actor ===
Year	Title	Role	Notes	Ref.
2001	Kabhi Khushi Kabhie Gham	Young Rahul	Child actor	

=== Voiceover ===
Year	Title	Role	Notes	Ref.
2004	The Incredibles	Dash Parr	Voice (Hindi dub)	
2019	The Lion King	Simba	Voice (Hindi dub)	
2024	Mufasa: The Lion King	Simba	Voice (Hindi dub)	

=== As a director ===
Year	Film	Role	Notes	Ref.
2025	The Ba***ds of Bollywood	Director, writer, creator and showrunner	Directorial debut	
