= Sameer Wankhede =

Indian law-enforcement officer

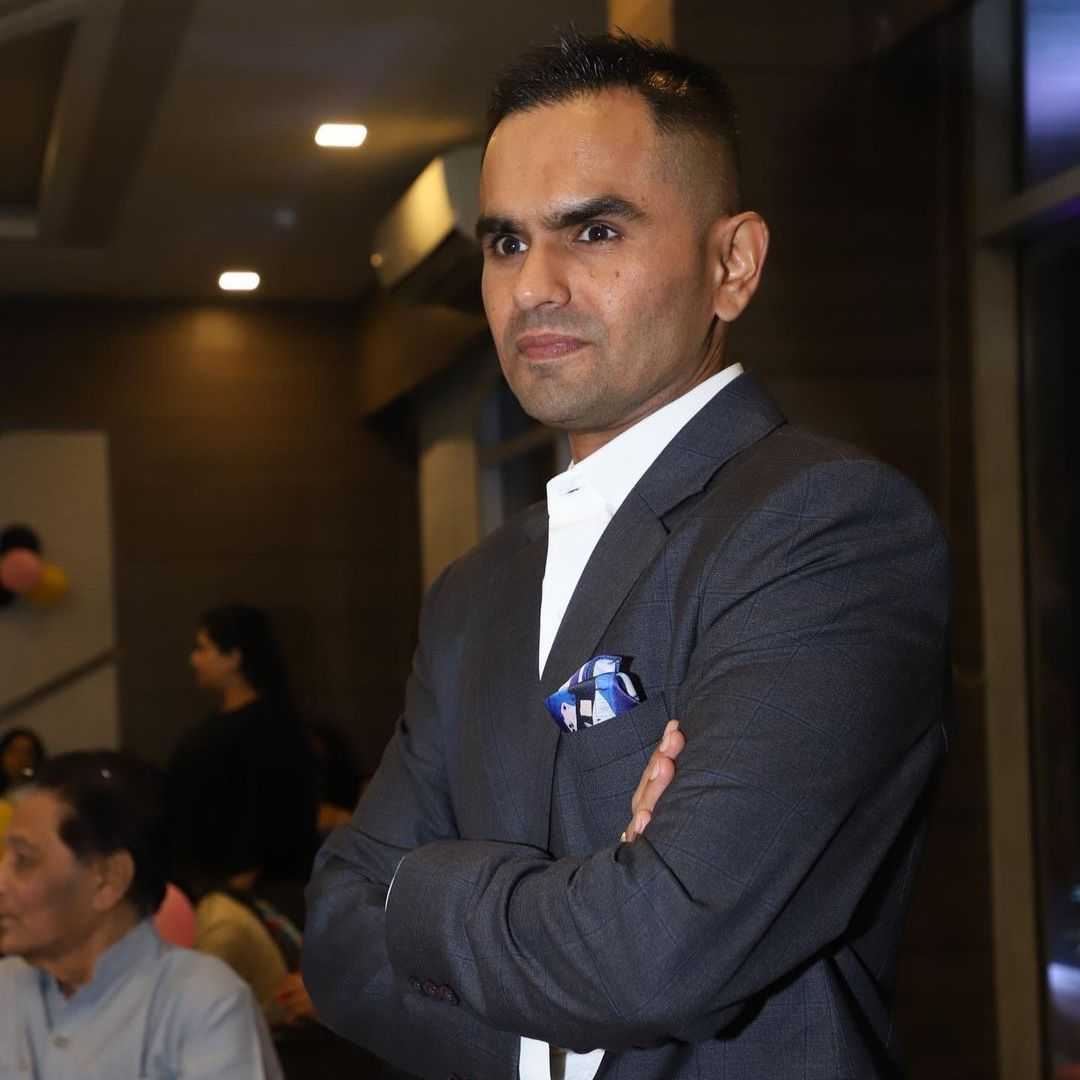
- Wankhede in Mumbai, 2015
- Born: Sameer Wankhede; 14 December 1979 (age 46); Mumbai, Maharashtra, India
- Education: Ramnarain Ruia College; University of Mumbai
- Occupation: Indian Revenue Service Officer (2008 batch)
- Employer(s): Indian Revenue Service; Narcotics Control Bureau
- Spouses: Shabana Qureshi (m. 2006; div. 2016); Kranti Redkar (m. 2017)
- Children: 3

Sameer Wankhede (born 14 December 1979) is an Indian Revenue Service officer of 2008 batch. Until 2021, he was posted as Zonal Director of the Narcotics Control Bureau (NCB). Prior to this Wankhede was posted on the National Investigation Agency and the Income Tax Air Intelligence Unit. In 2021, Wankhede gained nationwide attention for his involvement in the drug case related to Shah Rukh Khan's son Aryan Khan.

== Early life and education ==
Wankhede is a civil servant who works as an officer in the Indian Revenue Service (Custom & Indirect Taxes). He was born on 14 December 1979, in a middle-class Mahar family in Maharashtra, India. During his formative years, Wankhede developed a keen interest in social issues and governance. He completed his primary and secondary education in Maharashtra. He completed his BA in 2001 from Ramnarain Ruia College. He also graduated with a degree in Bachelor of Laws from the Mumbai University.

== Career ==
Sameer Wankhede appeared for 2007 UPSC Civil Services Examination and secured an All India Rank (AIR) of 561 in his first attempt and then joined the Indian Revenue Service batch of 2008.

Throughout his career, Wankhede has held various positions in law enforcement agencies involved in drug enforcement. He has been actively involved in conducting raids, intelligence operations, and undercover investigations targeting drug traffickers and their networks. During his 15-year career he has been credited with seizure of 17,000 kg narcotics and 165 kg gold.

=== Zakir Naik case ===
Wankhede played a crucial role in booking Islamic preacher Zakir Naik for money laundering and incitement of religious hatred.

=== Dawood Ibrahim's aide Chinku Pathan case ===
Chinku Pathan, known for his association with the infamous underworld don Dawood Ibrahim, was a notorious figure in the world of crime. He was involved in various illegal activities, including drug trafficking, extortion, and violence. The operation was led by Wankhede and the arrest took place as part of an operation conducted by the Narcotics Control Bureau (NCB).

=== Mika Singh Airport case ===
In February 2013, singer Mika Singh was detained when he tried to move out of Mumbai international airport without declaring over Rs 9 lakh after he arrived from Bangkok. Singh was detained by the Customs Air Intelligence Unit headed by Wankhede. Two liquor bottles, sunglasses and perfumes were found in Mika's bag.

=== Aryan Khan case and corruption allegations ===
Wankhede led the Cordelia case where a cruise ship was raided and Aryan Khan, the son of actor Shah Rukh Khan was arrested on charges of drug use and possession. Aryan Khan spent 25 days in jail before being given bail. In May 2022 all charges against Khan were dropped, with Wankhede removed from the case after being accused of blackmail. He was transferred to Chennai.

On 8 September, Wankhede was cleared of bribery charges related to Aryan Khan. In May 2023, he was charged with corruption for allegedly demanding a 25 crore rupees bribe from Khan. Wankhede denies the claims.

A probe by India's Narcotics Control Bureau alleged that Wankhede had failed to properly document certain confiscated items and cited irregularities in CCTV records. Wankhede denied the allegations, stating they were politically motivated and lacked evidence.

In May 2023, the Bombay High Court admitted Sameer Wankhede's petition seeking to quash a CBI FIR alleging bribery during the Aryan Khan drug case investigation, observing that “arguable questions are raised.” The Court granted interim relief and directed the CBI to complete its probe within three months.

In September 2025, Wankhede filed a defamation suit before the Delhi High Court, against Netflix & Red Chillies Entertainment Pvt Ltd, a production company owned by Shah Rukh Khan and his wife, seeking an injunction and damages for defaming him through a portrayal of him in their web series The Ba***ds of Bollywood. The case was filed in the Delhi High Court. He alleged the apparent parody of him was "false, malicious and defamatory". The defamation case was scheduled for a hearing on 30 October 2025. However, the court dismissed the defamation case and ruled that the complaint must be returned as it lacked jurisdiction to entertain the plea.

=== South Mumbai drug laboratory case ===
Wankhede's investigation led the authorities to the clandestine drug laboratory operating in South Mumbai. This laboratory was not only involved in manufacturing illegal narcotics but also acted as a central hub for the distribution of drugs to various parts of the city and beyond. The drug cartel was found to be involved in producing and trafficking various types of narcotics, including synthetic drugs, cocaine, and MDMA (Ecstasy). The scale of the operation and the volume of drugs being circulated raised serious concerns among law enforcement agencies and policymakers. The agency had seized 12 kilograms of mephedrone, a pistol and cash ₹2.18 crore.

=== Bipasha Basu Airport case ===
Actress Bipasha Basu was stopped at Mumbai International Airport after arriving from London in 2011 by Sameer Wankhede's team and fined Rs 12,000 for not declaring imported valuables worth Rs 6 million. She had allegedly not declared footwear, designer sunglasses and handbags.

== Personal life ==
He is married to Marathi actress Kranti Redkar. From his first marriage with Dr. Shabana Qureshi, he has a son, and from his second marriage, two daughters, twins Ziya and Zyda.
