= Dev (TV series) =

Indian thriller television series

- Genre: Crime; Drama; Mystery; Thriller
- Developed by: B.R. Sharan; Arshad Syed; Debojit Das; Agrim Joshi
- Directed by: Nissar Parvez; Alind Srivastava
- Starring: See below
- Country of origin: India
- Original language: Hindi
- No. of seasons: 2
- No. of episodes: 71

Production
- Producers: Nissar Parvez; Alind Srivastava; Rajesh Chadha
- Running time: 1 hour (Season 1); 30 minutes (Season 2)
- Production company: Peninsula Pictures

Original release
- Network: Colors TV
- Release: 5 August 2017 – 6 September 2018

Dev is an Indian suspense drama television series produced by Peninsula Pictures. It follows the story of Dev Anand Burman, a detective grappling with personal struggles, as he investigates crime stories inspired by real-life cases.

The first season premiered on 5 August 2017. Ashish Chaudhary, Sumona Chakravarti and Pooja Bose played the lead roles in this season. The first season ended on 12 November 2017 after the planned 27 episodes and was replaced by Entertainment Ki Raat.

The second season began airing on 25 June 2018. Ashish Chaudhary, Amit Dolawat, Jigyasa Singh and Pooja Bose play the lead roles in this season.

== Series overview ==
| Season | No. of episodes | Originally broadcast (India) | |
| Season | No. of episodes | First aired | Last aired |
|---|---|---|---|
| 1 | 27 | 5 August 2017 | 12 November 2017 |
| 2 | 44 | 25 June 2018 | 6 September 2018 |

== Plot ==
Detective Dev Anand Burman (Ashish Chaudhary) battles inner demons caused by the death of his wife Mahek. He has become a recluse but still works on criminal cases with Inspector Amod Narvekar. The Inspector believes that Dev murdered his own wife. Dev befriends his landlady Zohra Aapa who treats him like a son. Later, he meets fire-brand Meera who forces him to reassess his life.

== Cast ==
- Ashish Chaudhary as Detective Dev Anand Burman
- Pooja Bose as Mehek Miranda Burman / Vaani Sahay
- Sumona Chakravarti as Meera Banerjee
- Amit Dolawat as Inspector Amod Narvekar
- Jayshree Arora as Zohra Rizvi
- Rajesh Khera as Arastu Sahay
- Surbhi Jyoti as Lawyer Fatima Hydari
- Sonal Vengurlekar as Pranali Saluja
- Mandar Jadhav as Ankit Saluja
- Neha Chowdhury as Janhvi Purohit
- Gauri Singh
- Vijay Badlani
- Atharva Vishwakarma as Avinash Malhotra alias Avi
- Jigyasa Singh as Dhwani Karchiwala
- Divyangana Jain as Kinjal Singhal
- Ayush Shrivastava as Bhaskar Tripathi
- Sagar Mandal as Hemant

== Controversy ==
The show was previously titled Dev Anand. However, after the family of the legendary actor Dev Anand sent a notice to the makers, they decided to rename the show.

== Episodes ==
| Episode | Title | Directed by | Written by | Date of Broadcast |
|---|---|---|---|---|
| 1 | "Case File 1: The Kidnapping of Aanya" | Nissar Parvez & Alind Srivastava | Arshad Syed | August 5, 2017 |
When Anya gets kidnapped while playing in a children's park, her parents Pranali and Ankit seek help from Detective Dev Burman, who is unwilling to take the case initially as he finds it to be too straight forward but relents ultimately on the insistence of his landlady Zohra Aapa.
| 2 | "Case File 1: Will Aanya Be Found?" | Nissar Parvez & Alind Srivastava | Arshad Syed | August 6, 2017 |
Inspector Narvekar's investigation and the evidence that he gathers point the finger of suspicion towards Anya's father Ankit, as a consequence of which Police takes Ankit into their custody. Meanwhile Dev remains adamant that there is more to this case than is visible to the naked eye and his conviction leads him to Meera, through whom he comes across a hidden piece of information which makes the case much more complex than it seemed initially.
| 3 | "Case File 2: Murder in Samarpan Apartments" | Nissar Parvez & Alind Srivastava | Agrim Joshi & Debojit Das | August 12, 2017 |
A young woman named Geeta gets murdered in her house and Inspector Narvekar arrests her boyfriend Arjun on the basis of complaints received from Geeta's neighbours and her friend Daisy. Detective Dev has plenty of suspects on his radar but Arjun is not one of them and his scattered thoughts attain composure when he gets an unexpected help from Meera once again.
| 4 | "Case File 3: The Disappearance of Jahnvi Purohit" | Pushkar Mahabal | Agrim Joshi & Debojit Das | August 13, 2017 |
When Dev investigates the case of a pregnant woman who disappeared mysteriously seven days ago, he comes across a gruesome reality of our society.
| 5 | "Case File 4 : Who murdered Dimple Prabhakar?" | Pushkar Mahabal | Agrim Joshi & Debojit Das | August 19, 2017 |
When Dimple doesn't return home from work, her sister knocks on Dev's door for help. With Dev's help, the police not only find Dimple's body but also arrest the murderer with concrete evidence. But Dev is not satisfied, upon further investigation, he finds out that Dimple's murderer is someone else.
| 6 | "Dev's haunting past" | Sacchin Deo | Agrim Joshi & Debojit Das | August 20, 2017 |
Inspector Amod is concerned that his friend Meera is staying in Dev's home. Amod tells her the details of Uma Nayyar's murder which was the event where he first met Dev. Meera fears for her life.
| 7 | "Case File 5 : Papa....I'm Afraid to go to School" | Vighnesh Kamble | Debojit Das & Agrim Joshi | August 26, 2017 |
Dev stumbles upon a shocking case of suicide at Avi's school. The victim is one of the school's most highly respected teachers named Amit. But when Dev digs deeper, he uncovers something much more shocking than the act of suicide itself!
| 8 | "Case File 5 : Papa....I'm Afraid to go to School Part-2" | Vighnesh Kamble | Debojit Das & Agrim Joshi | August 27, 2017 |
Dev's investigation into Amit's suicide leads him to a series of shocking revelations. Turns out, Amit was having an extra marital affair and as Dev digs deeper, he is forced to question Amit's involvement in the incidents of child molestation. Will Dev be able to bring the real culprit to justice?
| 9 | "Case File 6 : An act of parricide" | Bithin Das | Debojit Das & Agrim Joshi | September 2, 2017 |
When the wife of a wealthy and reputed diamond merchant is brutally murdered in his own home, he decides to seek Dev's services to find the killer. Upon arrival, Dev learns that the killer is among his client's own family members! Can Dev solve this complicated case and find the murderer?
| 10 | "Fame's dark side!" | Suraj Rao | Debojit Das & Agrim Joshi | September 3, 2017 |
When a budding actress named Vishakha dies in her apartment, Dev decides to crack the case. As he delves deeper into it, he uncovers a sinister world of fame and drugs that Vishakha tragically fell victim to. Will the culprit be brought to light?

== See also ==
List of Hindi thriller shows
