= Prem Leela =

Indian Drama television series

- Genre: Drama; Romance
- Written by: Zahir Shaikh; Sonali Gupta Shrivastava (Dialogue)
- Directed by: Uththam Ahlawat; Vinod Rautela
- Creative directors: Namitha Bandekar; Puja Bebanshi
- Starring: Saachi Tiwari; Aakash Ahuja
- Theme music composer: Puneet Dikshit; Isha Gor
- Opening theme: Milke Kabhi Judaa Naa Honge Prem Leela
- Country of origin: India
- Original language: Hindi
- No. of seasons: 1
- No. of episodes: 200

Production
- Producers: Gul Khan; Karishma Jain
- Cinematography: Raju Ramprasad Goli
- Editors: Shashak Harendra Singh; Krishna Mahto
- Camera setup: Multi camera
- Production company: 4 Lions Films

Original release
- Network: Dangal
- Release: 16 December 2024 – 27 July 2025

Prem Leela (transl. Love Story) is an 2024 Indian romantic drama television series which was aired on Dangal under the banner of 4 Lions Films on 16 December 2024 to 27 July 2025 by replacing Deewani. It stars Saachi Tiwari and Aakash Ahuja.

== Plot ==
In Rampur two childhood lovers, Prem and Leela whom loves each other. But one day, in a temple festival a riot led by the dacoits separates them causing Prem to believe Leela is dead as Leela is being rescued by the dacoit head, Rudrakshi whom tooks Leela and the later raises her. Due to losing Leela, Prem's family then let to sends Prem to another city to complete his education.

=== 15 years later ===
Leela now renamed as Laadli, is now turned into an fearless dacoit and thus the later forgets her memories as Prem whom return to abroad after completing his education. Prem still misses Leela but he starts to hate dacoits whom blames them for losing Leela and also hates Rudrakshi whom he considers her as his enemy. Prem and Leela meets each other after Rudrakshi assigned Leela to kill Prem as Rudrakshi had a grudge against on Prem's grandmother, Durgawati. Leela then enters Prem's house pretending as a maid but after entering the house, Leela starts to feel having strange memories. Leela then meets Prem's mentally challenged sister, Charu and his friend, Uday who is a police inspector whom loves Charu befriends Leela.

Prem's uncle, Anshuman and his wife, Uttara whom plans to take control of Prem's entire property in which Uttara brings a women named, Aishwarya whom then pretends herself as Leela to Prem and the family. Both Prem and Leela clashes and hates each other while Aishwarya / Fake Leela becomes obsessive for Prem. While a goon and a drunkard named Laaka, whom becomes obsessive for Leela troubles her. He tries to marry Leela forcibly but Prem stops it and the later marries Leela as Leela, who being an Dacoit couldn't marry anyone. Both Prem and Leela kept their marriage truth as a secret to the family. Both Prem and Leela becomes close to each other which makes Aishwarya get jealous plots to separate Prem and Leela.

Leela finds out Aishwarya's truth and tries to expose to Prem and the family but fails everytime while Prem and Leela / Laadli's marriage is revealed to everyone. Prem decided to marry Aishwarya / Fake Leela while Leela learns she is actually the real Leela but another truth gets revealed when Rudrakshi learns Prem is her son while Aishwarya learns of this using Rudrakshi by blackmailing her stopping Leela from revealing the truth in which both Rudrakshi and Aishwarya joins hands and the plot to kill Leela.

Rudrakshi tries to kill her but she manages to escape. But Durgawati learns of Aishwarya's truth before she expose her, Aishwarya paralyzed Durgawati by injecting her with a medicine. She manages to reveal the truth of Aishwarya to the family but this time both Aishwarya and Rudrakshi tricks Leela again causing both Prem and his family turns against on her.

Leela finds out Prem is Rudrakshi's son and it is soon to be finds out Prem's father, Kishan is having a secret affair with Rudrakshi when he is married to Malathi as Kishan then plans to marry Rudrakshi but despite being an dacoit, she could not marry a man so due to which she couldn't marry him and later becomes pregnant with his child.

But Durgawati learns of this truth casts her for being an dacoit and the later blames her for the reason. When Malathi suffers a Labour pain, she gives birth to a child in the hospital at the same way where Rudrakshi also gives birth her child in the same hospital were Malathi gets admitted. But for a shock as Malathi's child has died after giving birth. To hide of this, Durgawati swaps Rudrakshi's child by giving Malathi's dead child to her and gives Rudrakshi's child to Malathi. After Prem grows up, Durgawati then manipulates against Rudrakshi and that is the reason why Prem starts to hate Rudrakshi and also causing Rudrakshi's vengeance towards on Durgawati for it, as Durgawati had hiding Prem's truth from everyone for many years.

Leela then brings Rudrakshi and she exposes Rudrakshi's truth to Prem and the family shocking them. Realizing, Rudrakshi is his mother, Prem starts to hate her even more. But Leela manages to reunite them, while Aishwarya plots to kill Leela in which she kidnaps her. Prem learns of Aishwarya's truth and realizes Laadli is his real Leela saves her but Uttara then tries to kill Leela. Meanwhile, Durgawati whom returns from paralysis reveals the truth of Uttara's true face to Prem and the family. Uttara gets expelled which also exposing Aishwarya's truth and in thus Aishwarya gets expelled and is later arrested by Uday for her crimes.

Meanwhile the entire family gets kicked out of the house by a loan shark due to Anshuman as he had taken a loan from him worth ₹80 crore (US$8.3 million) by lying to him, due to which the family had ended up living in a cottage. But for this Leela ends up meeting her mother, Indrani whom had been coma for many years during the incident returns by meeting Leela. Indrani, whom realizes this along with her brother and Leela's uncle, Saahas helps Leela and her family by repaying the loan and gets their house. But Saahas and Indrani plots against on both Prem, Rudrakshi and his family because Rudrakshi had troubled her and her family causing both Indrani and Saahas to hold a hatred towards on them. After they realises, Prem is Rudrakshi's son both Saahas and Indrani plans to separate both Prem and Leela by bringing a women named, Bijli and they blackmails her to frame Prem in order to save her brother, Chinku.

Bijli accuses Prem for molesting her and gets him arrested due to both Saahas and Indrani's plan. Leela decided to prove Prem's innocence and she tries to confront Bijli but fails. With the help of Uttara whom later apologizes Leela and the family for her mistakes, she finds out Saahas and her mother had blackmailed Bijli and they both are behind on Prem's arrest and all this she helps Bijli saving her brother, Chinku and then later apologizes Leela and later exposes Saahas and gets him arrested and bails Prem. Indrani whom later realises her mistake apologizes both Prem, Leela and the family and leaves.

But things gone worsened as Aishwarya returns where she is shown to being completely 7 months pregnant, Aishwarya claims she is pregnant with Prem's child which shocks them but they doesn't believes on this especially both Prem and Leela but Rudrakshi whom blindly believes on it. Aishwarya shows the DNA Report proving that the child which she holding is Prem's. Using this, Aishwarya creates problems in between both Prem and Leela along with the help of Anshuman.

It is revealed that the child which Aishwarya is holding is turns out to being Anshuman's and it is finds out Anshuman had bailed Aishwarya from jail in which both Anshuman and Aishwarya ends up in a physical intimation due to which Aishwarya becomes pregnant with his child. Anshuman finds out this, to hide the truth and also to save his relationship with Uttara he allows Aishwarya and her child to live in their house by using her child to make the family to believe she is holding Prem's child. As Aishwarya, whom still keeps her obsessiveness love towards on Prem decided to use her pregnancy as a weapon to separate both Prem and Leela. In which, Anshuman threatens the doctor to make Leela to believe she could not become as a mother but the truth is Leela could become as a mother.

Using her pregnancy and Rudrakshi's trust towards on her child, Aishwarya creates problems in between Prem and Leela along with Rudrakshi and Anshuman. Leela then realises the child which Aishwarya is holding is not Prem's while Aishwarya plans to marry Prem in order to separate Prem and Leela. Aishwarya brings Laaka and other villagers troubles Prem and his family and threatens Prem to marry Aishwarya. Before Prem could marry Aishwarya, Leela stops Prem and exposes Aishwarya's pregnancy truth to everyone.

Prem gets shot by Anshuman when he tries to shoot Aishwarya and Aishwarya runs away before she could reveal Anshuman's truth to everyone. Prem then recovers and gets suspicious towards on Anshuman and follows him where he sees Anshuman talking with Aishwarya both confessing their truth at each other. Prem realises Anshuman is the real father of Aishwarya's child followed by this he exposes Anshuman's truth in front of the family which shocks them especially Leela.

The Family later realises the truth blames Anshuman for ruining the family while Uttara, whom gets shocked to learn the truth behind of Anshuman and Aishwarya's truth blames Anshuman for ruining her relationship with him. Meanwhile, Aishwarya gets suffers from Labour pain and calls Leela to save her in which Leela along with other women's secretly helps Aishwarya by giving birth to a baby girl and gets her hospitalized. Aishwarya finds out Anshuman and her truth is out from the family and realises Anshuman and the family could never accepts her child. Realising her mistake, Aishwarya calls Leela again, apologizing Leela for her mistakes whom asked her to raise her child as she doesn't want to let her child to suffer the same fate as she did to the family and leaves by lefting the child which shocks her.

Leela then brings Aishwarya's child inside the house but neither anyone in the family including Rudrakshi, Durgawati and Uttara never accepts and blames the child. Prem and Leela decided to raise the child and they named the child as "Pari". Uttara still blames the child and calls the child as ill-omened for the family while Durgawati, whom don't want to let Pari to stay inside the house gives Pari to another couple to raise her but the couple is shown to being work for the human trafficker whom sells children's. Leela finds out this saves Pari from the human trafficker and gets them arrested. Rudrakshi, whom is enraged tries to immolate the child but Prem and Leela stops her. Realizing her mistakes, Rudrakshi leaves. But however Charu accidentally burnt the house this leads the family to move at their new house in Morena as Durgawati allows Pari to stay inside the house but she puts a decision that anyone in the family not to raise Pari anymore as Pari could be raised and live under by their family servant in their separate room. Prem and Leela is forcefully agreed to her decision.

=== 6 Months later ===
Prem, Leela and their entire family are moved in a new house after the fire incident as they never raise Pari due to Durgawati's decision and Uttara's growing hatred towards on Pari whom they still never accept her. As Pari, who is raised under by their family servant in their servant's room. After the servant stop herself from work, they brings a women named Kesar whom pretending to being mute as Kesar starts to raise Pari as Leela doubts on Kesar. Kesar is revealed to having an intention to snatch Pari and their family wealth with the help of Laaka, but however Kesar had another intention. She then tries to kill Leela at multiple times but fails every time. Meanwhile Prem's friend and a Doctor named, Nupur reveals she could become as a mother, while Leela learns of Kesar's true colours in which she exposes Kesar inside the family. In which Kesar confesses the truth that she had come to kill Leela because it is revealed Kesar is actually Laaka's wife as Laaka never accept Kesar as his wife due to his still growing obsessiveness towards on Leela causing Kesar to seek revenge against Leela.

Kesar tries to kill Leela again but both Prem and Leela manages to stop her and gets her locked in the cage but Laaka cames and saves Kesar and both Laaka and Kesar tries to harm the family but both Prem and Leela saves the family and gets both Kesar and Laaka to being arrested. Uttara, realizes her mistakes apologizes Leela and finally accepts Pari as her daughter while Durgawati also accepts Pari as their part of the family.

Meanwhile, An mysterious ghost of a women who seeks revenge against on Ankur and his friends, she then kills his friends, Rohit and Kiran as Ankur is afraid on this as he had hide a secret truth from the family while Leela whom is investigating the situation after the ghost had disturbing Leela to help her but the ghost possessed Leela's body and then she digs the grave outside the garden in their house founding the women's things in front of the family and she then tries to kill Ankur but Prem stops her and the family brings Sunaina, a Tantric to exorcise the ghost from Leela's body. Sunaina questions the ghost as the ghost reveals her name as Chanda and reveals why she is trying to kill Ankur.

It is revealed that Ankur and his friends had sexually abused and gangraped Chanda before the family is settled there. They kills her when she tried to escape and they buried her body outside the garden thus Chanda's vengeful spirit had vowed for her revenge. Sunaina removes Chanda's ghost from Leela's body after learning Chanda's tragic story Leela decided to bring justice for Chanda while Uttara and Anshuman learned about Ankur's crime they plot to save Ankur from getting arrested. Leela gains many evidences against Ankur but Ankur, Uttara and Anshuman destroys evidences and turns the family against Leela and they planned to get Ankur to leave the country.

Ankur threatens and challenges Leela as she foils Uttara and Anshuman's plan to get Ankur to leave the country as Prem learns about Ankur, Uttara and Anshuman's truth helps Leela by exposing Ankur and his friend's involvement in rape and murder of Chanda decided to help Leela exposes Ankur's truth to Durgawati. Shocking to learn about this, Durgawati disowns Ankur and she blames both Uttara and Anshuman for ruining the family as Leela goes to police station before Prem and Leela could sent Ankur to jail, Anshuman calls Laaka in which Anshuman and Laaka's goons knocks Prem. In a nick of time, Leela finds out this saves Prem and later both Prem and Leela gets both Ankur, Uttara and Anshuman arrested for their crimes finally getting justice for Chanda's soul. The show ends with both Prem and Leela waiting for their next child and raising Pari happily ever after.

== Cast ==
=== Main ===
- Saachi Tiwari as Leela "Laadli" Chaudhary (formerly Sehgal): Indrani's daughter; Prem's childhood friend turned wife; Pari's adoptive mother (2024–2025)
  - Kessar Kansara as Child Leela (2024)
- Aakash Ahuja as Prem Chaudhary: Kishan and Rudrakshi's son; Malathi's stepson; Charu's eldest stepbrother; Aishwarya's ex-boyfriend and ex-fiance; Leela's husband; Pari's adoptive father (2024–2025)
  - Jishan Hassani as Child Prem (2024)

=== Recurring ===
- Dolly Minhas as Durgawati Devi Chaudhary: Kishan and Anshuman's mother; Prem, Charu, Ankur, Shweta and Pari's grandmother (2024–2025)
- Simmi Dixit as Malathi Chaudhary: Kishan's wife; Prem's stepmother; Uday and Charu's mother (2024) (Dead)
- Chhaya Phanse as Charu Chaudhary: Kishan and Malathi's younger daughter; Prem's younger stepsister; Uday's love interest (2024–2025)
- Anurag Sharma as Anshuman Chaudhary: Kishan's younger brother; Prem, Charu and Uday's uncle; Uttara's husband; Ankur, Shweta and Pari's father (2024–2025)
- Ashita Dhawan as Uttara Chaudhary: Anshuman's wife; Ankur and Shweta's mother; Pari's stepmother (2024–2025)
- Akshay Chandela / Ashwini Chaturvedi as Ankur Chaudhary: Anshuman and Uttara's eldest son; Shweta's elder brother; Pari's eldest stepbrother; Prem, Uday and Charu's cousin; Rohit and Kiran's friend; Chanda's rapist and murderer (2024–2025) / (2025)
- Iqra Shaikh as Shweta Chaudhary: Anshuman and Uttara's youngest daughter; Ankur's younger sister; Pari's eldest stepsister; Prem, Uday and Charu's cousin (2024–2025)
- Unknown as Pari Chaudhary: Anshuman and Aishwarya's daughter; Uttara's stepdaughter; Ankur and Shweta's stepsister; Prem and Leela's adoptive daughter (2025)
- Antara Biswas as Rudrakshi: A Dacoit; Kishan's ex-lover; Prem's biological mother; Leela's mother figure (2024–2025)
- Ashmita Sharma as Indrani Sehgal: Sahas's elder sister; Leela's mother; Prem and Rudrakshi's enemy (2025)
- Soneer Vadhera as Saahas Sehgal: Indrani's younger brother; Leela's uncle; Prem and Rudrakshi's enemy (2025)
- Udit Shukla as Uday: Prem and Charu's friend; Charu's love-interest (2024–2025)
- Saniya Khera as Aishwarya / Fake Leela Chaudhary: Prem's one-sided obsessive lover and ex-fiance; Leela's former enemy; Uttara, Anshuman, Laaka and Rudrakshi's former accomplice; Pari's mother (2024–2025)
- Vijhay Badlani as Laaka: Leela's one-sided obsessive lover and ex-fiance; Kesar's husband; Aishwarya's former accomplice (2024–2025)
- Ragini Sharma as Kesar: Chaudhary family's maid; Laaka's wife; Leela's enemy and attempted killer (2025)
- Anup Ingale as Mohan: Leela's friend; Rudrakshi's first accomplice and sidekick (2024–2025)
- Utsav Singh as Jogi: Leela's friend; Rudrakshi's second accomplice and sidekick (2024–2025)
- Tumchach Prasad as Daksh: Leela's friend; Rudrakshi's third accomplice and sidekick (2024–2025)
- Manisha Saxena as Bijli: Chinku's elder sister (2025)
- Unknown as Chinku: Bijli's younger brother (2025)
- Akib Mughal as Loan Shark (2025)
- Dipali Jadhav as Sitara: A Human Trafficker (2025)
- Alika Nair as Sunaina: A Tantric (2025)
- Meghna Kukreja as Nupur: A Doctor and Prem's best friend (2025)
- Unknown as Chanda: A Girl whom gets raped and killed by Ankur and his friends (2025) (Dead / Ghost)

== Production ==
=== Development and casting ===
The series was announced by producer Gul Khan of 4 Lions Films in October 2024 and was confirmed in November 2024 by Dangal. Saachi Tiwari and Aakash Ahuja were signed as the leads.

=== Release ===
The first promo was released on 28 November 2024 featuring Saachi Tiwari, Aakash Ahuja and Antara Biswas. It was launched on 28 November 2024. It replaced the television series Deewani.

== See also ==
- Dangal TV
