= TV Ke Uss Paar =

- Genre: Sitcom
- Written by: Rahul Pandey
- Directed by: Deepak Sharma
- Creative director: siddhartha vankar
- Starring: Amita Khopkar; Aakash Ahuja; Sheen Das; Sakshi Mehta; Shabaaz Abdullah Badi
- Country of origin: India
- Original language: Hindi
- No. of seasons: 1
- No. of episodes: 138

Production
- Producer: Panglosean Entertainment Pvt Ltd
- Running time: 30 minutes (including commercial breaks)

Original release
- Network: Zindagi
- Release: 3 October 2016 – 11 March 2017

TV Ke Uss Paar is an Indian sitcom which aired on Zindagi. In the UK, the show is aired on &TV.

== Plot ==
TV Ke Uss Paar is a thrilling ride of a mother-son duo, Madhu and Vivek. Vivek works at an MNC while his mother spends her time watching television. His mother's craze for daily soaps leads her into the reel world, and soon, Vivek follows her there.

== Main cast ==
- Amita Khopkar as Madhu ji (Maa)
- Aakash Ahuja as Vivek (Madhu's son)
- Sheen Dass as Kavya (Vivek's boss and love interest)
- Sakshi Mehta as Shimar Pyaar Bharadwaj (TV star heroine)
- Shabaaz Abdullah Badi as Pyaar Bharadwaj (TV star hero)

== Recurring cast ==
- Tisha Kapoor as Jenny
- Suman Singh as Shivanjali (Madhu's daughter)
- Rupa Sahu as Sudha (Madhu's friend)
- Priti Arora as Timmy (Madhu's friend)
- Tasneem Ali as Rosy (Madhu's friend)
- Tasha Kapoor as Kritika
- Monika Meena as Boki
- Rohit Tailor as Vehem (Boki's husband)
- Surabhi Mallick as Aagya
- Nisha Pareek as Santosh Kumari
