= Jaya Bhattacharya =

Indian television actress (born 1978)

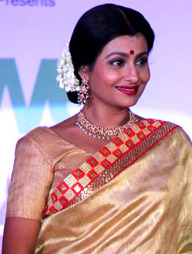
- Bhattacharya in 2015
- Born: Lucknow, Uttar Pradesh, India
- Education: University of Lucknow
- Occupation: Television actress
- Years active: 1991–present
- Known for: Kyunki Saas Bhi Kabhi Bahu Thi, Thapki Pyar Ki

Jaya Bhattacharya (Bengali pronunciation: [d͡ʒɔja bʱɔtːat͡ʃard͡ʒo]) is an Indian television actress. She is known for playing antagonistic roles in TV serials, widely known for playing Payal in Ekta Kapoor's soap opera Kyunki Saas Bhi Kabhi Bahu Thi. She also played the roles of Jigyasa Bali in Kasamh Se, Sakku Bai in Jhansi Ki Rani, and Sudha Buaa in Gangaa. She regained her popularity with her role of Vasundhara Pandey in drama series Thapki Pyar Ki (2015–2017). She appeared in Silsila Badalte Rishton Ka (2018–2019) and then she played the role of veena devi in Thapki Pyar Ki 2. She completed her formal education from St. Agnes' Loreto Day School and graduated from the University of Lucknow.

== Acting career ==
She played minor roles in Bollywood films Devdas and Lajja. Her breakthrough came in 2000 when she portrayed the main antagonist Payal Mehra in Ekta Kapoor's blockbuster Kyunki Saas Bhi Kabhi Bahu Thi on StarPlus, shattering TRP records at its peak to become the highest rated show in India at that time. She also had an appearance as Gayatri Bua in Zee Tv's Banoo Main Teri Dulhan. Bhattacharya was given a cameo appearance in the 2000s Hindi film Fiza, starring Karisma Kapoor. She has also worked in the film Jigyaasa where she played a filmmaker who wants to make a documentary on a controversial actress. This character was similar to the Alice Patten's role in the Indian movie Rang De Basanti. She has also acted in Kasamh Se as Jigyasa in 2007, in the same role.

Bhattacharya was seen in the avatar of Sakku Bai in historical series Jhansi Ki Rani on Zee TV. She joined the romantic soap opera Thapki Pyar Ki in the prominent supporting character of Vasundhara Pandey; the show aired between 2015 and 2017. In 2018, she entered the hit show Badho Bahu as a social worker Sushma Bua.

== Filmography ==
- Sirf Tum as Jency
- Fiza – cameo appearance
- Kyo Kii... Main Jhuth Nahin Bolta as Kavita Mhatre
- Devdas as Manorama (Paro's friend)
- Lajja as Lata
- Ho Sakta Hai as Snehal
- Jigyaasa as Neha Sharma
- Ek Vivaah Aisa Bhi
- Kalpvriksh as Gurpreet
- Antardwand as Bhabhi
- Mimi as Dr. Asha Desai
- Minus 31: The Nagpur Files as Rahi Shirke
- Shera as Jyoti Khurana

== Television ==
- Saraab - on DD National
- Pal Chhin (1999) - Anjali
- Rangoli (TV series) - on DD National
- Amber Dhara - Kamini Mehra
- Banoo Main Teri Dulhann - Gayatri Bhua
- Kahaani Hamaaray Mahaabhaarat Ki - Kunti (2008)
- Kaisa Ye Pyar Hai - Damini Bose (2005–2006)
- Karam Apnaa Apnaa - Shyla Daksh Kapoor (2006)
- Kasamh Se as Jigyasa Bali (2006–2007)
- Kesar - Reema
- Kkaanch
- Koshish - Ek Aashaa - Suniti
- Jai Hanuman - Goddess Laxmi (1997–2000)
- Hatim as Zalima (2004)
- Kyunki Saas Bhi Kabhi Bahu Thi - Payal Parikh/Payal Pratap Mehra (2000–2007)
- Raaz Ki Ek Baat
- Smriti
- Jai Maa Durga (TV Series) - Devi Kalika, Devi Chamunda, Devi Chandika
- Thodi Si Zameen Thoda Sa Aasmaan - Pooja (2006–2007)
- Virasaat
- Woh Rehne Waali Mehlon Ki - Savitri
- Jhansi Ki Rani (TV series) - Sakku Bai (2009–2011)
- Aise Karo Na Vidaa
- Ramleela – Ajay Devgn Ke Saath - Mandodhari
- Ek Thhi Naayka - Chavi Mehtha
- Upanishad Ganga - Ratnavali, Jabala
- Devon Ke Dev...Mahadev - Diti (2011–2014)
- Madhubala – Ek Ishq Ek Junoon
- Bharat Ka Veer Putra – Maharana Pratap - Mahamanga (2014)
- Gangaa - Sudha (2015–2017)
- Thapki Pyar Ki - Vasundhara 'Vasu' Balvinder Pandey (Dhruv and Kiran's mother/Bihaan's adoptive mother/Balvinder's wife) (2015–2017)
- Saab Ji (DD National, 2016)
- Badho Bahu as Sushma (2018; special appearance)
- Silsila Badalte Rishton Ka as Radhika Malhotra (2018–2019)
- Delhi Crime (2019)
- Pinjra Khoobsurti Ka as Manjari Shukla (2020–2021)
- Thapki Pyar Ki 2 as Veena Vinod Singhania (2021–2022)
- Palkon Ki Chhaon Mein 2 as Manorama Jha (2022–2023)
- Imlie as Indira (2024)
- Chhathi Maiyya Ki Bitiya as Urmila Singh (2024–2025)
- Kumkum Bhagya as Bua Maa (2025)
