= Dil Bekaraar =

Indian web TV series

- Based on: Those Pricey Thakur Girls by Anuja Chauhan
- Screenplay by: Suhani Kanwar; Ruchika Roy
- Directed by: Habib Faisal
- Starring: Akshay Oberoi; Sahher Bambba; Anjali Anand; Raj Babbar; Padmini Kolhapure; Sukhmani Sadana; Poonam Dhillon
- Opening theme: "Dil Bekaraar Title Track" by: Hitesh Modak; Kausar Munir
- Composer: Hitesh Modak
- Country of origin: India
- Original languages: Hindi; English
- No. of seasons: 1
- No. of episodes: 10

Production
- Cinematography: Rakesh Singh
- Editor: Abhijit Deshpande
- Running time: 30–35 minutes
- Production company: Sobo Films

Original release
- Network: Disney+ Hotstar
- Release: 26 November 2021

Dil Bekaraar is an Indian romantic comedy television series directed by Habib Faisal based on the 2013 novel Those Pricey Thakur Girls by Anuja Chauhan. The series stars Akshay Oberoi, Sahher Bambba, Anjali Anand, Raj Babbar, Padmini Kolhapure, Sukhmani Sadana and Poonam Dhillon. The series premiered on Disney+ Hotstar on 26 November 2021.

== Plot ==
Set in the 80s, the 10-episode series Dil Bekaraar revolves around the day-to-day shenanigans of Justice LN Thakur, his wife Mamta and their alphabetically named five daughters Anjini, Binodini, Chandu, Debjani and Eshwari.

== Cast ==
- Akshay Oberoi as Dylan Shekhawat
- Sahher Bambba as Debjani Thakur
- Raj Babbar as LN Thakur
- Poonam Dhillon as Mamata Thakur
- Anjali Anand as Binodini Thakur
- Sukhmani Sadana as Anjini Thakur
- Medha Shankar as Eshwari Thakur
- Sanya Thakur as Chandu Thakur
- Chandrachur Singh as Hardik Motla (Health Minister)
- Aditya Kapadia as Gulgul Thakur: AN and Bhudevi's son
- Pankaj Kalra as AN Thakur: LN's younger brother; Bhudevi's husband; Gulgul's father
- Padmini Kolhapure as Bhudevi Thakur: AN's wife; Gulgul's mother
- Apeksha Porwal as Mitali Pednekar: Dylan's ex–girlfriend
- Suhel Seth
- Tej Sapru as Sahas Shekhawat
- Sonali Sachdev as Juliet Shekhawat
- Aishwarya Aher as Natasha
- Surabhi Tiwari as Aap Aur Hum Show Host
- Kaisha Bhutani as Hardik Motla's daughter
- Kisha Arora as Bonu's Kid
- Aditya Jain as Jay Kakkar
- Hitesh Arora as Vicky
- Alekh Angal
- Arjun Berry
- Shataf Figar as Amitabh Bose
- Krishna Kant Singh Bundela as Yoga Instructor
- Sharat Sonu as Surendra Makhija
- Shiva Kumar as
- Prateek Kapoor as Basketball Coach
- Surya Mittal as Viewstrack News Host
- Sahil Takhi as CBI Inspector
- Sajid Hussain as Cameraman
- Ravindra Pal as Bartender
- Gurpreet Kaur as Dolly Ahluwalia
- Punesh Tripathi as Lineman
- Pawan Utwani as Friend
- Mahendra Vaswani as Advocate
- Ajay Madhok as Home Minister
- Shweta Padda as Sarala Narang
- Siddhant Shukla

== Episodes ==
No.	Title	Directed by	Written by	Original release date
1	"Ek Hasina Thi, Ek Diwana Tha"	Habib Faisal	Suhani Kanwar; Ruchika Roy	26 November 2021
2	"Baaton Baaton Mein"	Habib Faisal	Suhani Kanwar; Ruchika Roy	26 November 2021
3	"Jawani Janeman"	Habib Faisal	Suhani Kanwar; Ruchika Roy	26 November 2021
4	"Aajkal Tere Mere Pyaar Ke Charche"	Habib Faisal	Suhani Kanwar; Ruchika Roy	26 November 2021
5	"Pyaar Humein Kis Mod Pe Le Aaya"	Habib Faisal	Suhani Kanwar; Ruchika Roy	26 November 2021
6	"Gazab Ka Hai Din"	Habib Faisal	Suhani Kanwar; Ruchika Roy	26 November 2021
7	"Dard-e-Dil"	Habib Faisal	Suhani Kanwar; Ruchika Roy	26 November 2021
8	"Yeh Kahan Aa Gaye Hum"	Habib Faisal	Suhani Kanwar; Ruchika Roy	26 November 2021
9	"Hum Kisise Kum Nahi"	Habib Faisal	Suhani Kanwar; Ruchika Roy	26 November 2021
10	"Khullam Khulla Pyaar Karenge"	Habib Faisal	Suhani Kanwar; Ruchika Roy	26 November 2021

== Production ==
In 2019, Star India had commissioned the series adaptation of Anuja Chauhan's 2013 novel Those Pricey Thakur Girls for its then streaming service Hotstar under the newly created label Hotstar Specials as the rights for the adaptation was rebound to Chauhan.

=== Casting ===
In early July 2021, Medha Shankar was reportedly cast in the series. By the end of July 2021, casting was completed for the lead roles.

== Release ==
All episodes of the series were premiered on Disney+ Hotstar in India, on Hulu in the United States and on Hotstar globally on 26 November 2021.

=== Promotion ===
The series was unveiled by Disney+ Hotstar as part of the SpecialsX21 line-up along. The first teaser was released in early November 2021 followed by the trailer.

== Reception ==
Archika Khurana of The Times Of India rated the series three out of five and overall praised the story ‘Dil Bekaraar,’ with its family drama and romance set in the era of telegrams, typewriters, Doordarshan, and Campa Cola, will definitely take you down the memory lane while recreating the 80s magic. It's enjoyable! . Biswadeep Ghosh of National Herald noted that Dil Bekaraar will make us yearn for those lost years from not-so-far-back in time and might end up binge-watching it on a weekday. Nandini Ramnath of Scroll.in highly praised the performance of the cast and the story that recalls the 80s India. Shreemayee Das of Firstpost noted that the series did a great job of building the world of DD, Campa Cola, and imported perfume and with the help of the opening theme and credits the audience would be immediately placed in that world.
