= Esha Pathak =

Indian film actress

- Born: Eshaa; Satna, Madhya Pradesh
- Citizenship: india
- Occupation: Actress
- Known for: Anokhaa Bandhan

Esha Pathak is an Indian actress, she has starred in several TV shows, most notably playing the lead role of Gauri in Rishton Se Bandhi Gauri and as Ketki in Anokhaa Bandhan, and appearing in other popular serials like Jag Janani Maa Vaishno Devi – Kahani Mata Rani Ki, Faltu, Tara from Satara, and Vighnaharta Ganesh.

== Filmography ==
Year	Title	Role	Notes	Ref.
2019	Vighnaharta Ganesh			
2019	Tara from Satara			
2019-2020	Jag Janani Maa Vaishno Devi – Kahani Mata Rani Ki	Bharti Anjali Abrol	Teenage	
2022	Faltu	Ayesha Mittal		
2024-2025	Anokhaa Bandhan	Ketki Vardhan Mishra	lead	
2025	Rishton Se Bandhi Gauri	Gauri	lead	
