= Sahher Bambba =

Indian actress (born 1998)

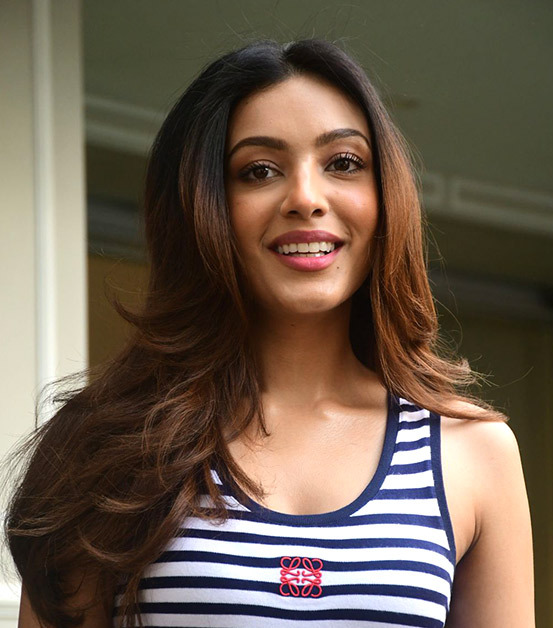
- Bambba in 2025
- Born: September 2, 1998 (age 28); Shimla, Himachal Pradesh, India
- Education: Jai Hind College
- Occupation: Actress
- Years active: 2019–present
- Parents: Sunil Bamboo (father); Shilpa Bamboo (mother)

Sahher Bambba (born 2 September 1998) is an Indian actress who primarily works in Hindi films and series. Bambba made her acting debut opposite Karan Deol with the romantic film Pal Pal Dil Ke Paas (2019). Bambba has since played Maham Begum in the historical drama The Empire (2021) and the leading lady in the comedy drama The Ba***ds of Bollywood (2025).

== Early life ==
Bambba was born and brought up in Shimla, Himachal Pradesh. She is a trained dancer. She completed her schooling from Shimla and moved to Mumbai to pursue her bachelor degree from Jai Hind College. She completed her master's degree in Journalism from Makhanlal Chaturvedi National University of Journalism and Communication.

== Career ==
Bambba made her acting debut in 2019 with the film Pal Pal Dil Ke Paas opposite Karan Deol. She played a vlogger who falls in love with a trekking company owner. The film emerged a box office bomb. Monika Rawal Kukreja praised her chemistry with Deol and noted, "Bambba’s confidence level is soaring high in the film. She’s modern and glamorous and knows how to leave a mark. Comfortable in the character she plays, this debutante doesn’t seem that she’s struggling hard to make her presence felt." Her performance earned her nomination for Screen Award for Best Female Debut.

Bambba expanded to web in 2021 with two releases. She first played Maham Begum, Mughal emperor Babur's chief consort opposite Kunal Kapoor in The Empire. Pradeep Menon of Firstpost found her performance "impressive". She then appeared in Dil Bekaraar, based on Anuja Chauhan's Those Pricey Thakur Girls. She played a newsreader opposite Akshay Oberoi. Nandini Ramnath was appreciative of her and Oberoi's "convincing" chemistry. Following a three year hiatus, Bambba played a woman facing unplanned pregnancy opposite Meezaan Jafri, in the 2024 film The Miranda Brothers. It had a digital release and opened to mixed to negative reviews.

Bambba had her career breakthrough in 2025 with The Ba***ds of Bollywood, a series that marked Aryan Khan's directorial debut. She played an actress opposite Lakshya Lalwani. Sahir Avik D'souza of The Quint took note of her "confidence and standout performance" but added that she was almost overshadowed by other actors around her.

== Filmography ==
=== Films ===
Year	Title	Role	Notes	Ref.
2019	Pal Pal Dil Ke Paas	Sahher Sethi Sehgal		
2024	The Miranda Brothers	Sol		

=== Television ===
Year	Title	Role	Notes	Ref.
2021	The Empire	Maham Begum		
2021	Dil Bekaraar	Debjani Thakur		
2025	The Ba***ds of Bollywood	Karishma Talwar		

=== Music video appearances ===
Year	Title	Co-star	Singer	Ref.
2022	"Ishq Nahi Karte"	Emraan Hashmi	B Praak	
2025	"Kamaal Hai"	King		

== Awards and nominations ==
Year	Award	Category	Work	Result	Ref.
2019	Screen Awards	Best Female Debut	Pal Pal Dil Ke Paas	Nominated	
