= Amita Khopkar =

Indian Marathi actress

- Born: Amita Khopkar
- Occupation: Actress

Amita Khopkar is an Indian actress associated with Marathi language stage, film and television.

== Career ==
Khopkar, who is a Marathi veteran actor, has performed in various plays.

== Filmography ==
Year	Film	Role
1987	Sant Gajanan Shegavicha	
1989	Guru Dakshina	
1993	Sawat Majhi Ladki	
1999	Sakhi Mazi	
2021	Photo Prem	
2014	Lai Bhaari	
2014	Sangharsh Mai	
2011	Hello JaiHind	
2009	Gaiir	
2008	Hari Om Vithala	
2008	Jawai Maaza Bhala	
2007	Savalee	
2005	Kay Dyache Bola	
2004	Chakwa	
2001	Gadar: Ek Prem Katha	

== Television ==
Year	Serial	Role	Channel
2007–2009	Asambhav	Kusum	Zee Marathi
2010–2011	Maziya Priyala Preet Kalena		Zee Marathi
2014	Sasural Simar Ka	Jwala	Colors TV
2014–2015	Tu Mera Hero	Surekha Govindnarayan Agarwal	Star Plus
2015	Gangaa	Shanta	And TV
2016–2017	TV Ke Uss Paar	Madhu	Zindagi
2018	Karn Sangini	Radha	Star Plus
2019–2020	Tara From Satara	Mrs. Mane	Sony Entertainment Television
2020–2021	Shubhmangal Online	Padma Palekar	Colors Marathi
2021	Yeh Rishta Kya Kehlata Hai	Kalavati Agarwal	Star Plus
2021	Wagle Ki Duniya – Nayi Peedhi Naye Kissey	Mrs. Walia (Episode 87)	SAB TV
2022–2024	Pinkicha Vijay Aso!	Maaisaheb Dhonde	Star Pravah
2022–2023	Main Hoon Aparajita	Kusumlata Singh	Zee TV
2023–2024	Shravani	Mrs. Singh	Shemaroo Umang
2025–2026	Gharo Ghari Matichya Chuli	Parvati / Lata	Star Pravah
