= Anokhaa Bandhan =

Indian television series

- Genre: Drama; Romance
- Written by: Priya Mishra; Manoj Sethi; Dialogues; Zahir Sheikh
- Screenplay by: Priya mishra Zaheer sheikh
- Directed by: Dilip Kumar
- Starring: Altamash Faraz; Esha Pathak; Rinku Ghosh
- Theme music composer: Bittu Merchant
- Composer: Dr. Sagar
- Country of origin: India
- Original language: Hindi
- No. of seasons: 1
- No. of episodes: 114

Production
- Executive producer: Dolly Majumder
- Producers: Santosh Singh; Rochelle Singh; Priya Mishra
- Cinematography: Rahul Soni
- Editors: Vishal Singh; Online Editor; Banti Singh; Pintu Singh
- Camera setup: Multi-camera
- Running time: 22-24 minutes
- Production company: Padmavati Production LLP

Original release
- Network: Dangal TV
- Release: 20 May – 25 September 2024

Anokhaa Bandhan (transl. Unique Bond) is an Indian Drama television series which was aired on Dangal on 20 May 2024 under the banner of Padmavati Productions. It stars Esha Pathak, Altamash Faraz and Rinku Ghosh in their lead roles.

== Plot ==
story revolves around a relationship between daughter-in-law and Mother-in-law who always Shields her daughter in law from her cruel son.

== Cast ==
=== Main ===
- Esha Pathak as Ketki Vardhan Mishra: Vardhan's wife; Sadhna's daughter-in-law; Mithi's mother (2024)
- Altamash Faraz as Vardhan Mishra: Sadhna's second son; Durlabh and Varun's brother; Ketki's husband; Mithi's father; Kalindi's ex-boyfriend (2024)
- Rinku Ghosh as Sadhna Mishra: Vardhan, Durlabh and Varun's mother; Ketki's mother-in-law; Mithi's grandmother (2024)

=== Recurring ===
- Pranjali Singh Parihar as Kalindi Chaterjee: Vardhan's ex-girlfriend; Ketki's rival (2024)
- Chaitanya Vyas as Varun Mishra; Sadhna's younger son; Vardhan and Durlabh's brother (2024)
- Zubeda Verma as Mrs Mishra; Vardhan Varun and Durlabh's Grandmother (2024)
- Ruchelle Dadwani as Mithi Vardhan Mishra: Ketki and Vardhan's daughter (2024)
- Riyanka Chanda as Sushma (2024)
- Urmimala Sinha Roy as Ruby (2024)
- Gopesh Krishna as Durlabh Mishra; Sadhna's elder son; Vardhan and Varun's brother (2024)
- Sonakshi Sharma as Naina (2024)

== Production ==
=== Development and casting ===
The series was announced by Padmavati Productions in April 2024 and was confirmed in May 2024 by Dangal. Altamash Faraz and Esha Pathak were signed as the leads. While Bhojpuri actress Rinku Ghosh joined as the female supporting role for the show.

Principal photography commenced in Ayodya, Uttar Pradesh.

=== Release ===
The first promo was released on 5 May 2024 featuring Altamash Faraz, Esha Pathak and Rinku Ghosh. It was launched on 20 May 2024.

== See also ==
- List of programmes broadcast by Dangal TV
