= Thapki Pyar Ki 2 =

Indian television series

- Genre: Drama
- Created by: Ved Raj
- Written by: Lakshmi Jaikumar; Pavni Mehandiratta; Manoj Tripathi; Gurmeet Kaur Udayan
- Directed by: Sanjay Satavase
- Starring: Jigyasa Singh; Prachi Bansal; Aakash Ahuja
- Theme music composer: Souvyk Chakraborty; Puneet Dikshit
- Country of origin: India
- Original language: Hindi
- No. of seasons: 1
- No. of episodes: 173

Production
- Producer: Ved Raj
- Editors: Sanjay Singh; Krishna Mahto
- Camera setup: Multi camera
- Production company: Shoonya Square Productions

Original release
- Network: Colors TV
- Release: 4 October 2021 – 8 April 2022

Related
- Thapki Pyar Ki

Thapki Pyar Ki 2 (transl. A Pat of Love 2) is an Indian television series which premiered on 4 October 2021 on Colors TV. Produced by Shoonya Square Productions, it is the spiritual sequel to the 2015 series Thapki Pyar Ki. It stars Jigyasa Singh and Prachi Bansal as Vaani Agarwal a.k.a. Thapki, and Aakash Ahuja as Purab Singhania.

== Plot ==
Vaani 'Thapki' Tripathi has a beautiful singing voice but she tends to stammer when she gets nervous which sometimes gets in the way of her dreams. Her role-model Veena Devi, a Padma Shri awardee, has a rich and handsome son, Purab. Thapki's mother Jaya lost her voice when her father Mukul left them years ago. He now lives with his second wife's daughter Hansika, a gold digger and Purab's colleague.

Upon hearing Thapki's voice, Veena is deeply impressed and wants Thapki to marry Purab who instead chooses to marry Hansika even though he doesn't love her. As per Veena's plans in a turn of events, Thapki weds Purab. Veena discovers her stuttering and now wants to throw her out. Purab agrees to leave her but then changes his decision due to a promise he made to thapki's mother Jaya to support Thapki. They help each other in every moment. Slowly Purab and Thapki fall in love with each other.

== Cast ==
=== Main ===
- Jigyasa Singh / Prachi Bansal as Thapki Purab Singhania (née Agarwal): Mukul and Jaya's daughter; Anjali's step-daughter; Hansika's half-sister; Purab's first wife (2021-2022)
- Aakash Ahuja as Purab Singhania: Vinod and Veena's elder son; Sargam's brother; Thapki and Hansika's husband (2021-2022)

=== Recurring ===
- Jaya Bhattacharya as Veena Devi Singhania – Vinod's wife; Purab and Sargam's mother (2021 - 2022)
- Arup Pal as Vinod Singhania – Jayanti's elder son; Pramod and Neeraj's brother; Veena's husband; Sargam and Purab's father (2021 - 2022)
- Shital Antani as Sapna Singhania – Pramod's widow; Neeraj's wife; Sagar and Armaan's mother (2021 - 2022)
- Preetesh Manas / Samaksh Sudi as Sagar Singhania – Sapna and Pramod's son; Armaan's half-brother; Preeti's ex-boyfriend; Priyanka's husband (2021) / (2021 - 2022)
- Neha Yadav as Priyanka Sagar Singhania – Sagar's wife (2021 - 2022)
- Additi Chopra as Sargam Singhania – Veena and Vinod's younger daughter; Purab's sister (2021 - 2022)
- Farida Dadi as Jayanti Singhania – Vinod, Pramod and Neeraj's mother; Purab, Armaan, Sargam and Sagar's grandmother (2021 - 2022)
- Rajvir Yadav as Shankar Kumar: Singhania family's servant (2021 - 2022)
- Pratish Vora as Ashok Tripathi – Jaya's brother; Sudha's husband; Anshul and Preeti's father (2021 - 2022)
- Urvashi Upadhyay as Sudha Tripathi – Ashok's wife; Preeti and Anshul's mother (2021 - 2022)
- Somesh Sharma as Anshul Tripathi – Ashok and Sudha's elder son; Preeti's brother (2021 - 2022)
- Nandini Maurya as Preeti Tripathi: Ashok and Sudha's daughter; Sagar's ex-lover (2021 - 2022)
- Akshaya Bhingarde as Jaya Tripathi Agarwal – Ashok's sister; Mukul's first wife; Thapki's mother; Hansika's step mother (2021 - 2022)
- Rudra Kaushish as Mukul Agarwal – Jaya and Anjali's husband; Thapki and Hansika's father (2021 - 2022)
- Rachana Mistry as Hansika Agarwal Singhania – Anjali and Mukul's daughter; Jaya's step daughter; Thapki's half sister; Purab's second wife (2021 - 2022)
- Tulika Patel as Anjali Mukul Agarwal – Mukul's second wife; Hansika's mother; Thapki's step mother (2021 - 2022)
- Unknown as Armaan Singhania — Sapna and Neeraj's son; Sagar's half-brother; Thapki's ex-fiancee (2021)

== Production ==
=== Development and casting ===
Production of the series began in August 2021.

When the second season was in pre-production, Jigyasa Singh who played Thapki in the first season, was then appearing in another Colors soap opera Shakti – Astitva Ke Ehsaas Ki as Heer Singh. Later when her character was killed off in August-end, she signed the second season of this series. Aakash Ahuja was cast as Purab Singhania and Jaya Bhattacharya was cast as Veena Singhania. Jigyasa Singh quit the show in February 2022 due to health issues. In February 2022, Prachi Bansal replaced Jigyasa Singh as Thapki.
