= Pal Pal Dil Ke Paas =

2019 Indian film by Sunny Deol

- Theatrical release poster
- Directed by: Sunny Deol
- Written by: Jasvinder Singh Bath; Ravi Shankaran
- Produced by: Zee Studios; Sunny Sound Pvt. Ltd.
- Starring: Karan Deol; Sahher Bambba; Aakash Ahuja
- Cinematography: Himman Dhamija; Ragul Dharuman
- Edited by: Devendra Murdeshwar
- Music by: Songs: Sachet–Parampara; Rishi Rich; Tanishk Bagchi; Score: Raju Singh
- Production companies: Zee Studios; Sunny Sound Pvt. Ltd. Vijayta Films
- Distributed by: Zee Studios
- Release date: 20 September 2019
- Running time: 154 minutes
- Country: India
- Language: Hindi
- Budget: ₹30 crore
- Box office: est.₹10 crore

Pal Pal Dil Ke Paas (transl. Every moment, close to the heart) is a 2019 Indian Hindi-language romantic drama film written and directed by Sunny Deol and produced by Sunny Sounds Pvt Ltd and Zee Studios. The films stars his son Karan Deol and Sahher Bambba. The film was released on 20 September 2019.

With the box office revenue recovering only a third of its production budget, the film was deemed a box office bomb.

== Plot ==
Saher Sethi, a vlogger from Delhi, goes to Manali to review a solo trekking trip organized by Camp Ujhi Dhaar, run by Karan Sehgal. She thinks that the costly solo trip is a scam, and she would expose the camp's owner. Although they started on a bitter note, things began to improve between them during their journey, leading to Karan falling for her. He doesn't confess his feelings but tells her that he is afraid of attachment. Saher admits that she wanted to become a singer but couldn't follow her passion as Viren, her boyfriend, made fun of her at an open mic. He takes Saher to his childhood spot, where he sees a snow leopard, and remembers his mother, who died in an avalanche when she tried to capture a snow leopard on her camera. The trip finally comes to an end, Karan drops Saher at the airport, and both bid farewell to each other.

On reaching Delhi, Saher realizes that she has fallen in love with Karan and breaks up with Viren. She informs Karan that she is performing again at an open mic and indirectly asks him to come to Delhi. Karan unexpectedly shows up at the Open Mic, and they both confess their love for each other and share a kiss. The next day, at Saher's house party, Karan is introduced to Saher's family members and meets Viren, who invites Karan to his party the next day. Seeing Saher and Karan close and happy with each other, Viren feels devastated and becomes angry and pledges that he will do anything to be with Saher, whether right or wrong. The next Day, Saher's father talks to Karan in anger, and when Saher asks him, he replies that Viren told him everything. Saher speaks to Viren over the phone about lying to his parents, but he blackmails her about leaking her photos, which he took secretly on the Goa trip. Karan goes to Viren, and when Viren abuses Saher and Karan's mother, he thrashes him. Feeling insulted, Saher posts a video online of being eve-teased by Viren, who gets to know about this, goes to Saher's house and gets involved in a fight with her. The fight leads to Saher falling off the first floor. With Saher now in an unconscious condition, Viren's parents use political power to turn the case against Saher and beat up Karan.

Seeing Saher's condition deteriorate and her family suffering all the disrespect, Karan goes to Viren's house, beats him up, drags him to the hospital, and tells him to apologize to Saher. When he refuses, Karan chokes him, almost killing him, but Viren's mother asks him to leave him, and she apologizes to everyone.

Saher soon recovers from the accident, and in the end credits, Karan and Saher are shown as a happily married couple.

== Cast ==
- Karan Deol as Karan Sehgal, Sahher’s boyfriend, later husband
- Sahher Bambba as Sahher Sethi Sehgal, Karan’s girlfriend, later wife
- Aakash Ahuja as Viren Narang, Saher's ex-boyfriend
- Simone Singh as Vandana Sethi (Saher's mother)
- Sachin Khedekar as Ajay Sethi (Saher's father)
- Kallirroi Tziafeta as Karan's mother
- Kamini Khanna as Saher's grandmother
- Meghna Malik as Central minister Ratna Narang, Viren's mother
- Arsh Wahi as Rohan Verma
- Rishi Singh as Saher's uncle
- Bhavna Aneja as Anuradha, Saher's aunt
- Ravi Dudeja as Natasha's Father
- Madhu Khandari as Natasha's Mother
- Ritika Thakur as Aditi Thakur (Karan's best friend)
- Akash Dhar as MP Sushant Narang, Viren's brother
- Nupur Nagpal as Natasha Sabharwal, Saher's childhood friend
- Kapil Negi as Vikram Thakur (Karan's mentor and Aditi's father)
- Suhani Sethi as Saachi Sethi (Saher's sister)
- Vijayant Kohli as Kapil Kumar Gupta
- Rahul Singh as Sachin
- Mannu Sandhu as Sushant's wife
- Pooja Katyal as Pooja, Viren's friend
- Diksha Bahl as Vaishali
- Reuben Israel as Viren's father
- Aayush Tiwari as Reporter

== Production ==
=== Casting ===
Over 400 girls were auditioned for Sahher's role.

=== Filming ===
Principal photography began on 21 May 2017. The film was mostly shot at various locations in the Pir Panjal Mountain Range covering Spiti Valley, Kunzum La, Rohtang La, Tabo, Chandra Taal, Kaza, Lahaul Valley and Manali region in Himachal Pradesh, while a substantial part was shot at locations in New Delhi, including a racing car sequence at Buddh International Circuit in NCR.

== Music and soundtrack ==
Pal Pal Dil Ke Paas

Soundtrack album by Sachet–Parampara and Tanishk Bagchi
- Released: 29 August 2019
- Recorded: 2018–2019
- Genre: Feature film soundtrack
- Length: 40:14
- Language: Hindi
- Label: Zee Music Company
External audio
- Audio Jukebox on YouTube

The music for the film’s songs was composed by Sachet–Parampara, Rishi Rich and Tanishk Bagchi, and the lyrics of the songs were penned by Siddharth–Garima. The background score of the movie was done by Raju Singh.

Track listing
No.	Title	Singer(s)	Length
1.	"Aadha Bhi Zyaada"	Hansraj Raghuwanshi; Rap: Karan Deol	3:01
2.	"Pal Pal Dil Ke Paas – Title Track"	Arijit Singh, Parampara Thakur	4:14
3.	"Ho Jaa Awara" (Music by: Tanishk Bagchi)	Monali Thakur, Ash King	3:50
4.	"Ishaq Chaliya"	Sachet Tandon, Parampara Thakur	4:34
5.	"Dil Uda Patanga"	Parampara Thakur, Sachet Tandon	4:27
6.	"Maa Ka Mann"	Parampara Thakur, Sachet Tandon	3:48
7.	"Pal Pal Dil Ke Paas – Celebration"	Sachet Tandon, Parampara Thakur	3:56
8.	"Pal Pal Dil Ke Paas – Version 2"	Sachet Tandon, Parampara Thakur	4:14
9.	"Suun Le Rabb"	Sachet Tandon	2:12
10.	"Pal Pal Dil Ke Paas" (Palak Version)	Palak Muchhal	5:58
Total length:			40:14

== Reception ==
The film received negative reviews from critics. On review aggregation site Rotten Tomatoes, 20% of 5 critics' reviews are positive.

Monika Rawal Kukreja writing for Hindustan Times noted that the film had done justice to its genre and praised Karan Deol and Sahher Bambba for their onscreen freshness. Also praising cinematography and music, she criticised the writing for lacking punch dialogues and effective humour. Concluding she opined, "Pal Pal Dil Ke Paas is definitely one of your run-of-the-mill love stories, but it makes you smile, cry, laugh and brings a sense of freshness."

Gaurang Chauhan of Times Now rated it 2.5 stars out of 5, stated that "Pal Pal Dil Ke Paas is a visually stunning film with some good tunes but the movie somehow misses the mark due to its overlong length and a mediocre screenplay. Sahher Bambba impresses".

Parina Taneja of India TV gave 2 stars out of 5 and opined, that it was a love story that failed to leave the audience with lingering moments. Agreeing with Chauhan, Taneja praised the performance of Bambba, direction and cinematography. Criticising screenplay and pace of the film she noted that music though melodious didn't add value to the film. Concluding, she wrote, "Pal Pal Dil Ke Paas is a one time watch only if you really want to enjoy the breathtaking visuals of Himachal Pradesh."

Further NDTV rated the movie 1 out of 5 and wrote "Pal Pal Dil Ke Paas lacks the freshness that one would expect from a film with a new romantic pair. The reason is obvious: the plot is as old, but not as sturdy, as the hills."

=== Box office ===
The film performed poorly at the box office, collecting ₹10.03 crore against a ₹30 crore budget. Pal Pal Dil Ke Paas collected ₹1.15 crore on the opening day with a total opening weekend collection of ₹ 4.15 crore.
