= The Ba***ds of Bollywood =

2025 series by Aryan Khan

- Official poster
- Genre: Action; Comedy drama; Satire
- Created by: Aryan Khan
- Showrunner: Aryan Khan
- Written by: Aryan Khan; Bilal Siddiqi; Manav Chauhan
- Directed by: Aryan Khan
- Starring: Bobby Deol; Lakshya; Raghav Juyal; Sahher Bambba; Anya Singh
- Music by: Score: Shashwat Sachdev; Songs: Shashwat Sachdev; Anirudh Ravichander; Ujwal Gupta
- Country of origin: India
- Original language: Hindi
- No. of seasons: 1
- No. of episodes: 7

Production
- Executive producers: Bonnie Jain; Akshat Verma
- Producer: Gauri Khan
- Cinematography: Jay Oza
- Editor: Nitin Baid
- Camera setup: Multi-camera
- Running time: 39–56 minutes
- Production company: Red Chillies Entertainment

Original release
- Network: Netflix
- Release: 18 September 2025

The Ba***ds of Bollywood is an Indian Hindi-language satirical action comedy drama series created, co-written, and directed by Aryan Khan in his directorial debut for Netflix. Produced by Gauri Khan under Red Chillies Entertainment, it features Bobby Deol, Lakshya, Raghav Juyal, Sahher Bambba, Anya Singh, Manoj Pahwa, Manish Chaudhari, Rajat Bedi, Meherzan Mazda, Divik Sharma, Mona Singh, Gautami Kapoor, Vijayant Kohli, Rohit Gill, Javed Furquan, Neville Bharucha, and Armaan Khera.

The series follows Aasmaan Singh, an actor from Delhi, whose successful debut under producer Freddy Sodawallah leads to a role opposite Karishma Talvar in a film by Karan Johar. He faces challenges including Freddy’s multi-film contract, interference from Karishma’s father Ajay Talvar, a developing romance, and unforeseen complications. The series premiered on 18 September 2025 with seven episodes and received positive reviews, with critics highlighting Khan's direction, the story, screenplay, and performances.

== Premise ==
Aasmaan Singh is a young actor whose debut film, produced by the domineering Freddy Sodawallah, becomes a hit, earning him a role opposite Karishma Talvar in a new project directed by Karan Johar. Freddy’s insistence on an exclusive three-film contract threatens Aasmaan’s opportunity, pushing him, his manager Sanya, and friend Parvaiz to navigate Bollywood’s competitive landscape. As Aasmaan’s bond with Karishma grows, her father, veteran actor Ajay Talvar, disapproves and attempts to sabotage Aasmaan’s career, while personal and professional challenges, including public scandals and family pressures, test their ambitions in the unpredictable world of Bollywood.

== Cast ==
Adapted from the source media:

- Bobby Deol as Ajay Talvar, a prominent actor and father of Shaumik and Karishma
- Lakshya as Aasmaan Singh, a Bollywood actor and Karishma's boyfriend
- Raghav Juyal as Parvaiz, Aasmaan's best friend
- Sahher Bambba as Karishma Talvar, Ajay's daughter, Shaumik's sister and Aasman's girlfriend
- Anya Singh as Sanya, Aasmaan's manager
- Manoj Pahwa as Avtaar Singh, Aasmaan's uncle
- Manish Chaudhari as Freddy Sodawallah, a film producer and owner of Sodawallah Productions
- Rajat Bedi as Jaraj Saxena, an actor banned by the movie mafia
- Meherzan Mazda as Jeejeebhoy, a talent agent working for Freddy
- Divik Sharma as Shaumik Talvar, Ajay's son
- Mona Singh as Neeta Singh, Aasmaan's mother
- Gautami Kapoor as Anu Talvar, Ajay's wife and mother of Shaumik and Karishma
- Vijayant Kohli as Rajat Singh, Neeta's husband
- Rohit Gill as Press Reporter
- Javed Furquan as Press Reporter
- Neville Bharucha as DJ Adam
- Armaan Khera as Sameer Sinha, Karishma's boyfriend
- Denzil Smith as Mr Sinha, Sameer's father
- Nishant Kkhanduja as Vaastav Shrivastav
- Priyam Saha as Karen, a production designer
- Kanchan Khilhare as Aiza, Gafoor's daughter
- Satya Prakash as a paparazzi
- Sant Ranjan as Chota Kashif, Gafoor's goon
- Akkshay Gunaawat as Salim Bhai, Gafoor's goon
- Bhupindder Bhoopii as Rafiq Bhai, Gafoor's goon
- Sanjay Dadhich as Abdul Bhai, Gafoor's goon

=== Cameo appearances ===
- Shah Rukh Khan as himself
- Salman Khan as himself
- Aamir Khan as himself
- Arshad Warsi as Gafoor Ismail, an underworld don
- Emraan Hashmi as himself, an intimacy coach
- Karan Johar as himself
- Ranbir Kapoor as himself
- Ranveer Singh as himself
  - Singh also appears as Rocky Randhawa from Rocky Aur Rani Kii Prem Kahaani in a photo presence
- Rajkummar Rao as himself
- Siddhant Chaturvedi as himself
- Ibrahim Ali Khan as himself
- Orhan Awatramani "Orry" as himself
- Disha Patani as herself
- Sara Ali Khan as herself
- Shanaya Kapoor as herself
- Vishal Dadlani as himself
- S. S. Rajamouli as himself
- Badshah as himself
- Pranay Manchanda as Sanjeev Sharma, a film critic
- Diljit Dosanjh (vocal only)
- Pooja Dadlani as herself, Shah Rukh's personal manager
- Arjun Kapoor as himself
- Maheep Kapoor as herself
- Bhavana Pandey as herself
- Neelam Kothari as herself
- Seema Sajdeh as herself
- Shalini Passi as herself
- Azzy Bagria as himself
- Karan Aujla (vocal only)
- Alia Bhatt as Rani Chatterjee from Rocky Aur Rani Kii Prem Kahaani (photo presence)

== Episodes ==
Episode	Title	Release date
1	"Meet the Ba***ds"	18 September 2025
Aasmaan Singh lives in Mumbai with his friend Parvaiz and uncle Avtaar Singh, a former playback singer. His debut film, produced by Freddy Sodawallah’s company, becomes a hit. Aasmaan’s parents, Rajat and Neeta Singh, visit from Delhi to celebrate. At a party, Aasmaan meets actor Ajay Talvar. His manager, Sanya Ahmed, pitches him to Karan Johar for a film role, but Freddy pressures Aasmaan into signing a three-film deal. At a roundtable conference hosted by Sanjeev, Aasmaan insults Karishma Talvar, Ajay’s daughter, for her industry connections, causing tension with Ajay. Impressed by Aasmaan’s boldness, Karan offers him the role.
2	"Movie Mafia"	18 September 2025
Aasmaan, Sanya, and Parvaiz meet Freddy and encounter Jaraj Saxena, who has been sidelined for 15 years after signing with another producer. Freddy initially supports Aasmaan’s work with Karan but later urges him to cancel. At Dharma Productions, Aasmaan learns Karishma is the female lead and apologises for his earlier remarks, but a reporter’s comment sparks a scene. Aasmaan signs a commercial to fund his father Rajat’s liver transplant. Rajat advises him to stay resilient. Ajay disapproves of Aasmaan’s casting opposite Karishma. When Freddy pressures Aasmaan to abandon Karan’s project, Aasmaan cancels the three-film deal and leaves.
3	"Barbaad Mohabbat"	18 September 2025
Aasmaan, Parvaiz, Sanya, Karishma, and her bodyguard Sukhi travel to Goa to rehearse intimate scenes. The intimacy coach is replaced by Emraan Hashmi, who struggles to train them. Ajay monitors Karishma through Sukhi. After failing to perform, Aasmaan and Karishma are locked on a balcony, where they bond and improve their acting, impressing Hashmi. The next day, Aasmaan performs a Heimlich manoeuvre when Karishma chokes on a fishbone, and the incident goes viral, causing a scandal. Karishma’s brother Shaumik embarrasses the family by publicising the news. Karishma explains the situation to her parents. Freddy assigns lawyers against Aasmaan, but Parvaiz’s friends force Freddy to sign a new deal. Ajay refuses Freddy’s request for help, unwilling to work with him if Aasmaan joins Karan’s film.
4	"Bullshit Party"	18 September 2025
Aasmaan and his friends celebrate when Parvaiz secures a new deal from Freddy, though they overlook his coercive methods. Freddy faces challenges as Ajay refuses to work with him due to Aasmaan’s involvement in Karan’s film, threatening Sodawallah Productions. Karan approaches Aasmaan and Avtaar for his movie. Ajay grows concerned about Karishma’s friendship with Aasmaan and invites him home to rehearse but becomes uneasy with the script’s intimate scenes. At Karishma’s birthday party, her boyfriend Sameer proposes under pressure from Ajay, and she reluctantly accepts. Aasmaan leaves the party upset. Karishma, learning Ajay orchestrated the proposal, questions Aasmaan about his feelings, but he is kidnapped by goons before responding.
5	"My Hero"	18 September 2025
Aasmaan is taken to meet Ghafoor Ismail, an underworld don. Jaraj Saxena obtains a video of the meeting and uses it to strike a deal with Freddy to ruin Aasmaan’s career. Freddy leverages the video to convince Ajay to sign a film with him in exchange for removing Aasmaan from Karan’s project. The video leads to Aasmaan’s removal from the film. Karishma suspects Ajay’s involvement but he denies it. She visits Aasmaan but misinterprets seeing him with another woman as him moving on. Meanwhile, Rajat undergoes a liver transplant, but his body rejects it, and he passes away.
6	"The Filmfirst Awards"	18 September 2025
Aasmaan attends the Filmfirst Awards with his family, where he is nominated for Best Actor. Karishma discovers Ajay’s role in removing Aasmaan from Karan’s film. Aasmaan wins the award and delivers a speech. Backstage, Karishma reveals Ajay’s actions, leading Aasmaan to confront and punch Ajay, sparking a public scandal. Karishma challenges Ajay over his interference and expresses her desire to be with Aasmaan. Ajay locks her in a study, but she contacts Aasmaan, confessing her feelings. Aasmaan and Parvaiz rescue Karishma from Ajay’s house.
7	"Picture ka title hoga..."	18 September 2025
Aasmaan and Karishma plan to marry, but Ajay intercepts them before they can sign the marriage papers, leading to a confrontation. Neeta reveals that Aasmaan and Karishma are half-siblings from her past affair with Ajay, halting their plans. Aasmaan and Karishma agree to remain friends and part ways. Aasmaan and his team partner with Ghafoor Ismail to produce more films. Meanwhile, Jaraj, Freddy and Jeejeebhoy orchestrate a meeting between Neeta and Ajay, blackmailing them to star in a new Sodawallah Productions family drama series titled The Bastards of Bollywood, including Aasmaan and Karishma.

== Production ==
The Ba***ds of Bollywood marks the directorial and writing debut of Aryan Khan, who also serves as the showrunner. Produced by Gauri Khan under Red Chillies Entertainment, the series was co-written by Khan with Bilal Siddiqi and Manav Chauhan. Khan, a graduate of the USC School of Cinematic Arts with a Bachelor of Fine Arts in Film and Television Production, drew on his industry experience to craft a satirical take on Bollywood’s inner workings. The series features a large ensemble cast, including Bobby Deol, Lakshya, Sahher Bambba and cameos from Bollywood figures such as Shah Rukh Khan, Salman Khan, Aamir Khan, Ranbir Kapoor, Ranveer Singh and Karan Johar. Filming took place primarily in Mumbai, capturing the city’s film industry setting, with cinematography by Jay Pinak Oza and editing by Nitin Baid.

A music video, "Ghafoor", featuring Tamannaah Bhatia, Shakti Kapoor, Gulshan Grover and Ranjeet, directed by Farah Khan, was created to promote the series but used only as a background score in the series. To engage fans, Aryan Khan and Shah Rukh Khan collaborated with Meta in mid-October 2025 to launch India's first "secret reel", a BTS video from the series. Unlike standard reels, this video requires a password to unlock, which can be deduced from a clue in Episode 6.

== Soundtrack ==
The Ba***ds of Bollywood

Soundtrack album by Shashwat Sachdev, Anirudh Ravichander, and Ujwal Gupta
- Released: 16 September 2025
- Recorded: 2024–2025
- Studios: Albuquerque Records, Chennai; YRF Studios, Mumbai; Kuhn Labs, Mumbai
- Genre: Soundtrack
- Length: 38:24
- Language: Hindi
- Label: T-Series
External audio
- The Ba***ds Of Bollywood (Audio Jukebox) on YouTube

The soundtrack features an original score by Shashwat Sachdev and songs composed by Sachdev, Anirudh Ravichander and Ujwal Gupta. The music rights were acquired by T-Series. The album, released on 16 September 2025, includes 13 tracks. The first single, "Badli Si Hawa Hai", written by Kumaar and sung by Arijit Singh and Amira Gill, was released on 23 August 2025. "Tenu Ki Pata", featuring vocals by Diljit Dosanjh, Aryan Khan and Ujwal Gupta, was released on 11 September 2025. "Ghafoor", with vocals by Shilpa Rao and Ujwal Gupta, was released as a music video on 19 September 2025.

The iconic song "Duniya Haseeno Ka Mela", from the 1997 hindi film Gupt, starring Bobby Deol features in the series finale. This song is used in a scene where VFX was used to superimpose Mona Singh's face (playing Neeta Singh) over the original dancer (Bhanu Khan) alongside Bobby Deol (playing Ajay Talvar).

No.	Title	Lyrics	Music	Singer(s)	Length
1.	"Behad"	Shashwat Sachdev	Shashwat Sachdev	Faheem Abdullah, Shashwat Sachdev	2:58
2.	"Ghafoor"	Shashwat Sachdev	Shashwat Sachdev	Shilpa Rao, Ujwal Gupta	2:46
3.	"Badli Si Hawa Hai"	Kumaar	Anirudh Ravichander	Arijit Singh, Amira Gill	4:01
4.	"Sajna Tu Baimaan"	Shashwat Sachdev	Shashwat Sachdev	Shilpa Rao, B Praak, Shashwat Sachdev	2:21
5.	"Number 1 (Title Track)"	Kumaar	Ujwal Gupta	Vishal Dadlani	2:45
6.	"Ashiqaan"	Jasmine Sandlas, Shashwat Sachdev	Shashwat Sachdev	Jasmine Sandlas, Shashwat Sachdev	2:28
7.	"Ruseya"	Jasmine Sandlas	Shashwat Sachdev	Jubin Nautiyal, Shashwat Sachdev	3:39
8.	"Tu Pehli Tu Aakhri"	Kumaar	Shashwat Sachdev	Arijit Singh	3:20
9.	"Who's Your Daddy"	Akshat Verma, Vishal Dadlani	Shashwat Sachdev	Vishal Dadlani, Shashwat Sachdev	3:29
10.	"Everybody Knows"	Dev Singh	Ujwal Gupta	Raja Kumari	2:16
11.	"Revolver"	Aryan Khan, Raja Kumari	Shashwat Sachdev	Vishal Dadlani, Raja Kumari, Piyush Kapoor, Shashwat Sachdev	2:43
12.	"Movie Scene"	Karan Aujla	Shashwat Sachdev, Karan Aujla	Vishal Dadlani, Karan Aujla, Piyush Kapoor, Aryan Khan, Shashwat Sachdev	2:45
13.	"Tenu Ki Pata"	Kumaar	Ujwal Gupta	Diljit Dosanjh, Aryan Khan, Ujwal Gupta	2:53
Total length:					38:24

== Release ==
The Ba***ds of Bollywood premiered on Netflix on 18 September 2025.

== Reception ==
On the review aggregator website Rotten Tomatoes, 89% of 9 critics' reviews are positive, with an average rating of 6.1/10.

Shubhra Gupta of The Indian Express gave 2.5 stars out of 5 and said that "Aryan Khan's debut as a director is a mixed bag -- while it entertains in parts, it deflates into seen-before ordinariness when it segues into showing us ‘the other side’ of the film industry." Simran Khan Times Now rated it 3.5/5 stars and said that "With his debut show, Shah Rukh Khan's son Aryan takes viewers on a witty, thrilling, and hilarious ride into Bollywood’s chaotic world." Sana Farzeen of India Today gave it 3.5 stars out of 5 and stated that "‘The Ba***ds of Bollywood’ is not perfect, but it’s honest, funny, and absolutely dramatic, something that we all love, isn't it? The next time this debutant director steps out, people will be queuing up for an autograph. But Aryan, pen kidhar hai? (Where is the pen)?"

Yatamanyu Narain of News 18 rated it 3.5/5 stars and observed that "Aryan Khan’s Netflix debut is a daring satire filled with nepotism digs, celebrity cameos, and a sharp take on Bollywood hypocrisy." Abhimanyu Mathur of Hindustan Times gave 3 stars out of 5 and said that " Aryan Khan's directorial debut never takes itself seriously, which helps it be entertaining, but leaves it a little shallow." Hardika Gupta of NDTV observed that "By the time the final episode wraps, you realise this isn't meant to be dissected like high art. It's meant to be consumed like Bollywood itself: loud, colourful, problematic, indulgent, but great fun if you let it be."

Sakshi Verma of India TV gave 3 stars out 5 and commented that "The Ba**ds Of Bollywood is a classic masala entertainer that is full of surprises, fun, drama and thrills. The show is not boring at any point and tries to make a glittery remark amid all the chaos and distress. The show is bouncy and should be taken as a fun watch. Renuka Vyavahare of The Times of India rated it 3.5/5 stars and said that "Daringly self-aware, the seven part series finds its footing in quieter moments—when it isn't busy showcasing star cameos or industry jabs. This is less of a scathing satire and more of an edgy, meta love letter to the film industry." Aashna Nadkarni of Mashable commented that "It is a complete treat for every Bollywood enthusiast!"

Sahir Avik D’souza of The Quint rated it 3.5/5 stars and writes in his review that "If Luck by Chance and Om Shanti Om had a foul-mouthed lovechild—that child would be Aryan Khan’s The Ba***ds of Bollywood." Bollywood Hungama gave it 3.5 stars out of 5 and said that "THE BA***DS OF BOLLYWOOD is a hilarious and entertaining take on Bollywood and works because of Aryan Khan’s expert direction, crazy-n-entertaining moments, performances, shocking climax and starry cameos." Deepa Gahlot of Rediff.com rated it 3/5 stars and stated that "Aryan Khan has made The Ba***ds of Bollywood entertaining and wicked."

== Accolades ==
Award	Date of ceremony	Category	Recipient(s)	Result	Ref.
Bollywood Hungama India Entertainment Awards	3–4 December 2025	Best Director	Aryan Khan	Won	
Bollywood Hungama India Entertainment Awards	3–4 December 2025	Best Supporting Actor – Female	Anya Singh	Won	
Bollywood Hungama India Entertainment Awards	3–4 December 2025	Best Supporting Actor – Male	Rajat Bedi	Won	
Bollywood Hungama India Entertainment Awards	3–4 December 2025	Breakthrough Performer of the Year – Male	Raghav Juyal	Won	
Iconic Gold Awards	18 February 2026	Best Debut Director - Web Series	Aryan Khan	Won	
Iconic Gold Awards	18 February 2026	Best Writer	Bilal Siddiqi; Aryan Khan; Manav Chauhan	Won	
Iconic Gold Awards	18 February 2026	Outstanding Performer	Mona Singh	Won	
Iconic Gold Awards	18 February 2026	Best Comeback In OTT	Rajat Bedi	Won	
Iconic Gold Awards	18 February 2026	Best Web Series (Popular)	Red Chillies Entertainment	Won	
Iconic Gold Awards	18 February 2026	Most Promising Actress - Web Series	Anya Singh	Won	
Iconic Gold Awards	18 February 2026	Rising Star (Popular)	Sahher Bambba	Won	

== Controversies ==
Following the release of The Ba***ds of Bollywood, the National Human Rights Commission filed a complaint with the Mumbai Police against the show for depicting Ranbir Kapoor using a banned electronic cigarette on screen without a statutory warning or disclaimer. Similarly, IRS officer Sameer Wankhede, former Narcotics Control Bureau zonal director who led the 2021 Cordelia cruise drug bust resulting in Aryan Khan's arrest (from which Khan was later cleared), who faced a pending CBI probe in Mumbai court for alleged bribery in connection with the case, filed a defamation suit against the show's makers at the Delhi High Court. He alleged the apparent parody of him was "false, malicious and defamatory". The defamation case was scheduled for a hearing on 30 October 2025. However, the court dismissed the defamation case and ruled that the complaint must be returned as it lacked jurisdiction to entertain the plea.
