= Thapki Pyar Ki =

Indian television series

- Genre: Soap opera
- Written by: Ved Raj Shrivastava; Dialogue: Dheeraj Sarna
- Screenplay by: Sudhir Kumar Singh
- Directed by: Ranjan Kumar Singh; Mayank Gupta; Dharmendra Sharma Vaibhav Vansraj Singh
- Creative director: Harshad Y. P.
- Starring: Jigyasa Singh; Manish Goplani; Ankit Bathla; Nitanshi Goel
- Opening theme: "Thap, Thap, Thapki ... Thapki Pyar Ki"
- Country of origin: India
- Original language: Hindi
- No. of seasons: 1
- No. of episodes: 704

Production
- Executive producer: Pradeep Mendola
- Producers: Ved Raj; Faizal Alanaa; Dheeraj Sarna; Kamanna Menezas
- Production locations: Mumbai; Agra
- Editors: Pankaj Kathpal; Rahul Mathur
- Camera setup: Multi camera
- Running time: Approx. 20 minutes
- Production companies: Sol Productions; Shoonya Square Productions

Original release
- Network: Colors TV
- Release: 25 May 2015 – 14 July 2017

Related
- Thapki Pyar Ki 2

Thapki Pyar Ki (transl. "A Pat of Love") is a 704-episode Indian Hindi-language television series which aired on Colors TV from 2 May 2015 to 14 July 2017. It tells the story of Thapki Chaturvedi, a young woman who stutters. The series stars Jigyasa Singh, Manish Goplani, Ankit Bathla, Sheena Bajaj, and Monica Khanna. A sequel, Thapki Pyar Ki 2 aired on Colors TV from 4 October 2021 to 8 April 2022.

== Plot ==
This Story Revolves around a beautiful and ambitious girl, Vani Chaturvedi who is named then "Thapki" by the people due to her stammering issue but she never let this affect herself and only concentrate on her dreams but that issue was preventing her from receiving marriage proposals. She becomes engaged to Diwakar, who abandons her on her wedding day after unabling to accept her with her flaw . Thapki works at a TV station owned by Dhruv Pandey, who falls in love with her. Dhruv's mother, Vasundhara, Who initially likes Thapki, disapproves her after learning about her stammering and orders her adopted son Bihaan to marry Thapki by taking Dhruv's place on the wedding day. Bihaan reluctantly agrees and marries Thapki by deceit, who decides to divorce him but then forced to live with him to save her family's honour and pass every challenge to maintain her position as an ideal daughter-in-law. Vasundhra meets Shraddha and decides to get her married to Dhruv, unaware of her wicked-self. Bihaan and Thapki see through her but despite their efforts to warn Vasundhara, Dhruv and Shraddha marry. Dhruv is unable to forget Thapki even after the marriage , and Shraddha is jealous to know this, so she creates numerous problems and challenges for Thapki and Bihaan along with Vasundhara but they both overcome all that and ended up together after clearing all their initial misunderstandings. After Thapki saves Vasundhara from a falling deity, Vasundhara's attitude toward her changes and she disregards Shraddha after knowing her reality. Thapki and Bihaan fall in love after overcoming another trouble but Shraddha, In order to take revenge, tricks Vasundhara into revealing her plot of breaking Thapki and Dhruv's wedding which shocks the entire Pandey Family.

Dhruv despises Vasundhra for preventing his marriage to Thapki but the Pandey family later forgives her after Thapki and Bihaan's efforts to reunite Vasundhara with them. Balwinder, Vasundhara's husband, announces Thapki and Bihaan's remarriage to free them from that deceit but Dhruv, who is still madly in love with Thapki, start to create misunderstandings between Thapki and Bihaan to separate them but they eventually reunites in the end. On Thapki and Bihaan's wedding day, Dhruv hits Bihaan and takes his place. Bihaan comes to, and stops the marriage. Dhruv kidnaps and tries to marry Thapki, but Bihaan saves her while Dhruv leaves the house after regretting his deeds.

Bihaan's biological mother Kosi and step-father (uncle) Naman step in the Pandey house to get the kidney from Bihaan for their son Janardhan, but Thapki learns about their reality and tries to warn Bihaan and the family about that. Kosi accuses Thapki of trying to kill her; Bihaan believes her, and cuts ties with Thapki. Thapki tells Bihaan by letter that she is pregnant; the letter is found by Sankar, Kosi's maid, who loves Bihaan. Thapki has an accident and loses the baby.

She returns two years later as Vaani Oberoi to take revenge from Bihaan, assuming him as the culprit of their baby and later shake hands with Kabir Katyal, who also wants revenge on Bihaan for torching the house of his sister Neha. Dhruv returns; he found Thapki after her accident. They expose Kosi after their numerous efforts and Bihaan disowns her. Thapki believe that Bihaan is innocent but Kabir refuses to accept and wants to punish Bihaan severely by creating troubles for the whole family. Thapki, Vasundhara, and Neha expose Sankar as the arsonist. Sankar reveals that she caused Thapki's accident two years ago to remove her from Bihaan's life and also burned down Neha's house too.

Dhruv divorces Shraddha and marries Aditi. Shraddha seduces him and becomes pregnant. Aditi (also pregnant with Dhruv's child) is heartbroken, but Dhruv proves his innocence. Thapki and Bihaan reconcile, and Thapki becomes pregnant. Sankar and Kosi return in disguise, seeking revenge by attempting to explode the whole Pandey family but failed. Sankar fakes her death, and Bihaan is arrested for her murder. She blackmails Thapki, saying that Bihaan will be saved only if she leaves him. Thapki gives birth to twin daughters Bani and Tina, but tells Bihaan and his family that the girls are Kabir's.

Sankar tries to kill Tina, whom Bihaan (unaware that she is his daughter) saves and adopts. Tina is presumed dead. Thapki leaves with Kabir and Bani. Shraddha tells Sankar that she knows about the blackmail. Aditi finds out, and tells Bihaan. They reach Thapki, but Shraddha runs them down which results in Aditi's death and Bihaan's memory loss.

7 Years Later Everthing is now changed in Pandey family after all the children grow up. Dhruv blames Thapki for whatever happened in the past. Shraddha and Sankar mistreat Tina. Thapki, now works as a crime reporter, lives with Bani in Agra. Shraddha and Sankar plot to separate Bihaan and Tina. Shraddha sends Tina to the Agra boarding school Bani attends, and the girls become friends. Thapki meets Bihaan at the school; he does not recognize her, but she helps him regain his memory despite Sankar and Shraddha's efforts to foil her plans. After gaining his memory back, Bihaan, Thapki, Bani, and Tina expose Sankar, who is arrested but Shraddha escapes with her usual drama. Everything seems well in Pandey Family and they all visit Temple but then comes Gangster Amma Mai who kidnaps Bani to marry her son, Prince, and forcefully lives with the Pandey Family to make them agree for the marriage and Shraddha also worse the situation by disguising herself as Thapki to set up the marriage but caught later and got arrested while Amma Mai leaves the house after the misunderstanding seems cleared. She later got hell-bent again on doing Bani's marriage with Prince by kidnapping her again Bihaan and Thapki try to save Bani. Amma Mai accidentally shoots Bihaan, who falls from a cliff to his death. She is arrested, but Bani blames Thapki for Bihaan's death as Shraddha was asked to act as Thapki by Amma Mai to make Bani misunderstand her mother. Bani leaves the house in anger and was found by Kosi who sheltered her while Thapki got kidnapped by Shraddha. She was about to finish Thapki but Vasundhara foils her plan and gets her arrested, saving Thapki.

15 Years Later Thapki is completely lost in Bihaan's thoughts and hoping for his return, despite Vasundhara's words to bring her to sense. Thapki's daughter Tina who is now grown-up is engaged to Samar Kapoor who works as a reporter in Thapki's News Channel but he was unhappy with that as he was never in love with Tina but still marrying her for the family's honour. While Bani, who vows to take revenge from her mother, returns home with Munna (her friend) and Kosi who completely brewed her mind against her own family. To hurt Thapki, Bani intends to break Tina's marriage but Thapki learns about it and she later meets Aryan Khanna (The businessman and Bihaan's lookalike) and pleads him to help her to stop Bani. Aryan agrees but his real intention was to mend his relation with Munna (Manav Khanna) who was actually his brother and blames him for their mother's death.

Bani later learns about Aryan's truth and in anger, she devises a plan with Kosi where she acts in agreeing to marry Munna who is in love with her and their marriage was also bound to happen along with Tina and Samar's. On the wedding day, Kosi kidnaps and capture Thapki while messing with the wedding where Bani marries Samar and Tina marries Munna and Thapki was assumed guilty by the Pandey Family. Aryan helps Thapki by clearing Bani's misunderstanding, regarding her mom and she reconciles with Thapki, while Kosi was exposed and sent to jail for good.

The Pandey Family forgives Thapki except Tina and Vasudhara who still misunderstands her and Thapki even forbids Aryan and Bani from revealing truth to them. Thapki and Bani meets with an accident where Bani was declared dead and Thapki was happened to undergo plastic surgery due to the accident and got a new face, much to the shock of Pandey Family but they still accept her except Aryan who feels skeptical about her. The new Thapki (Lovely) actually turned out to be an imposter and have got kidnapped Thapki and Bani but Aryan exposes her with Thapki's help and rescues Bani while Lovely (Actually Thapki's long lost twin sister; Mohini) who accepts to did that in her hatred for Thapki of separating her from their family in childhood but then repents and reunites with her. Aryan then propose to Thapki after falling in love with her but Thapki refuses to let him take Bihaan's place but Aryan's identify got revealed to the whole family who were initially furious but Bani clears all the misunderstanding and Thapki was forgiven. The family also accept Aryan in Bihaan's place and even convinced Thapki to accept him too. Aryan marries Thapki in last and the family celebrate this joyful moment, living happily ever after.

== Cast ==
=== Main ===
- Jigyasa Singh as
  - Vaani "Thapki" Chaturvedi Khanna: Krishnakant and Poonam's eldest daughter; Aditi, Mohini and Shubh's sister; Bihaan's widow; Aryaan's wife; Baani and Tina's mother (2015–2017)
  - Baani Pandey Kapoor: Bihaan and Vaani's elder daughter; Aryaan's step-daughter; Tina's sister; Samar's wife (2017)
    - Nitanshi Goel as Child Baani Pandey (2017)
- Manish Goplani as
  - Bihaan Pandey: Balwinder and Vasundhara's youngest son; Kosi's biological son; Sanjay, Ashwin, Dhruv and Kiran's brother; Vaani's first husband; Baani and Tina's father (2015–2017)
  - Aryaan Khanna: Manav's brother; Vaani's second husband; Baani and Tina's step-father (2017)
- Sheena Bajaj as Aditi Chaturvedi Pandey: Krishnakant and Poonam's second daughter; Vaani, Mohini and Shubh's sister; Dhruv's second wife; Veeransh's mother; Ananya's step-mother (2015–2017)
  - Aalisha Panwar replaced Bajaj as Aditi Chaturvedi Pandey (2016)
- Ankit Bathla as Dhruv Pandey: Balwinder and Vasundhara's third son; Sanjay, Ashwin, Bihaan and Kiran's brother; Shraddha's ex-husband; Aditi's widower; Ananya and Veeransh's father (2015–2017)
  - Jatin Shah replaced Bathla as Dhruv Pandey (2017)
- Kritika Sharma as Tina Pandey Khanna: Bihaan and Vaani's younger daughter; Aryaan's step-daughter; Baani's sister; Manav's wife (2017)
  - Luvneet Rajput as Child Tina (2017)
- Gaurav Wadhwa as Samar Kapoor: Dolly's son; Baani's husband (2017)
- Abhinandhan Jindai as Manav Khanna: Aryaan's brother, Tina's husband (2017)

=== Recurring ===
- Prateeksha Lonkar as Poonam Chaturvedi: Krishnakant's wife; Vaani, Aditi, Mohini and Shubh's mother; Baani, Tina and Veeransh's grandmother (2015–2017)
- Shakti Singh as Krishnakant Chaturvedi: Poonam's husband; Vaani, Aditi, Mohini and Shubh's father; Baani, Tina and Veeransh's grandfather (2015–2017)
- Hunar Hali as Mohini Chaturvedi: Krishnakant and Poonam's youngest daughter; Vaani, Aditi and Shubh's sister (2017)
- Shubh Kalra as Shubh Chaturvedi: Krishnakant and Poonam's son; Vaani, Aditi and Mohini's brother (2015)
- Usha Rana as Sumitra Pandey: Dilip's wife; Balwinder's mother; Sanjay, Ashwin, Dhruv, Bihaan and Kiran's grandmother; Ananya, Veeransh, Baani and Tina's great-grandmother (2015–2017)
- Jaya Bhattacharya as Vasundhara Pandey: Balwinder's wife; Sanjay, Ashwin, Dhruv, Bihaan and Kiran's mother; Baani, Tina, Ananya and Veeransh's grandmother (2015–2017)
- Jairoop Jeevan as Balwinder Pandey: Vasundhara's husband; Sanjay, Ashwin, Dhruv, Bihaan and Kiran's father; Baani, Tina, Ananya and Veeransh's grandfather (2015–2017)
- Pooja Sahu as Suman Pandey: Sanjay's wife (2015–2017)
- Vikky Chaudhary as Sanjay Pandey: Balwinder and Vasundhara's eldest son; Ashwin, Dhruv, Bihaan and Kiran's brother; Suman's husband (2015–2017)
- Resham Thakkar as Preeti Pandey: Ashwin's wife (2015–2017)
- Sanjay Pandya as Ashwin Pandey: Balwinder and Vasundhara's second son; Sanjay, Dhruv, Bihaan and Kiran's brother; Preeti's husband (2015–2017)
- Sia Bhatia as Ananya "Anu" Pandey: Dhruv and Shraddha's daughter; Aditi's step-daughter; Veeransh's step-sister (2017)
- Atharva Phadnis as Veeransh "Veer" Pandey: Dhruv and Aditi's son; Shraddha's step-son; Ananya's step-brother (2017)
- Sabina Jat as Kiran Pandey: Balwinder and Vasundhara's daughter; Sanjay, Ashwin, Dhruv and Bihaan's sister (2015–2016)
- Monica Khanna as Shraddha Siakal: Dhruv's ex-wife; Ananya's mother; Veeransh's step-mother (2015–2017)
- Smita Singh as Kosi Jaiswal: Sujeet's widow; Naman's wife; Janardhan's mother (2016–2017)
- Hemant Choudhary as Naman Jaiswal: Kosi's second husband; Janardhan's father (2016–2017)
- Aakash Talwar as Janardhan "John" Jaiswal: Naman and Kosi's son; Sujeet's step-son; Bihaan's step-brother (2016)
- Surjit Saha as Sunil Kumar Ahuja – Thapki's colleague (2015–2016)
- Dolly Chawla as Sankar Shehlawat: Bihaan's obsessive one sided lover (2016–2017)
- Sehban Azim as Kabir Katyal – Neha's brother; (2016–2017)
- Kamal Sharma as Neha Rane (nee Katyal) – Kabir's sister (2016–2017)
- Jaanvi Sangwan as Shagun Kumari Shekhawat / Amma Mai – Monty and Prince's mother (2017)
- Rehaan Roy as Monty Shekhawat - Shagun's elder son; (2017)
- Vishal Jethwa as Prince Shekhawat - Shagun's younger son; (2017)
- Hetal Gada as Kesar Singh - Monty's wife (2017)
- Sharan Kaur as Sheena Arora – Bihaan's childhood friend (2016)
- Vishal Thakkar as Paan – Bihaan's best friend (2015)
- Hardik Sangani as Diwakar Mishra – Thapki's ex-fiance; (2015–2016)

== Sequel ==
Colors TV announced a sequel in July 2021: Thapki Pyar Ki 2, starring Jigyasa Singh (later replaced by Prachi Bansal) and Aakash Ahuja.
