= Aakash Ahuja =

Indian actor

- Born: 13 September 1991 (age 34); Delhi, India
- Occupation: Actor
- Years active: 2011–present
- Known for: Thapki Pyaar Ki 2 Faltu

Aakash Ahuja is an Indian actor who works in Hindi films and television. Ahuja is best known for his portrayal of Viren Narang in the film Pal Pal Dil Ke Paas and Purab Singhania in Thapki Pyar Ki 2.

== Career ==
Ahuja has been part of many TV series including O Gujariya: Badlein Chal Duniya, Qubool Hai, Box Cricket League and played the lead role of Vivek in TV Ke Uss Paar.

He made his web debut in 2016 with Voot's Shaadi Boys playing Neil Chaturvedi.

In 2019, he made his film debut with Pal Pal Dil Ke Paas. He played the negative lead, Viren Narang.

Ahuja is best known for his portrayal of Purab Singhania in Thapki Pyar Ki 2 from 2021 to 2022. From November 2022 to August 2023, he played as Ayaan Mittal in Faltu.

== Filmography ==
=== Films ===
Year	Title	Role	Notes	Ref.
2019	Pal Pal Dil Ke Paas	Viren Narang	Debut	

=== Television ===
Year	Title	Role	Notes	Ref.
2014	O Gujariya: Badlein Chal Duniya	Samar Khan		
2015	Qubool Hai	Saif		
2016	Box Cricket League	Contestant	Season 2	
2016–2017	TV Ke Uss Paar	Vivek		
2017	Dil Buffering	Gaurav	TV mini series	
2021–2022	Thapki Pyar Ki 2	Purab Singhania		
2022–2023	Faltu	Ayaan Mittal		
2024	Badall Pe Paon Hai	Rajat Khanna		
2024–2025	Prem Leela	Prem Singh Chaudhary		
2026	Taara	Arjun Shrivastav		

=== Web series ===
Year	Title	Role	Notes	Ref.
2016	Shaadi Boys	Neil Chaturvedi	Voot series	
