= Faltu (TV series) =

Indian drama television series

- Genre: Romance; Drama
- Directed by: Sanjay Satavase; Maanish Singh; Vinod Rautela
- Creative director: Aarooshee Sood
- Starring: Niharika Chouksey; Aakash Ahuja
- Country of origin: India
- Original language: Hindi
- No. of seasons: 1
- No. of episodes: 291

Production
- Producers: Sushanta Das; Gurjit Singh; Surinder Singh
- Cinematography: Indranil Singha
- Camera setup: Multi-camera
- Running time: 22 minutes
- Production company: Boyhood Productions

Original release
- Network: StarPlus
- Release: 2 November 2022 – 20 August 2023

Faltu (transl. Useless) is an Indian Hindi-language drama television series produced under Boyhood Productions, starring Niharika Chouksey and Aakash Ahuja. It premiered on 2 November 2022 on StarPlus and digitally streams on Disney+ Hotstar. It ended on 20 August 2023.

== Plot ==
The story revolves around an unwanted girl, Faltu, named useless after her parents' frustration at the birth of a third girl and a stillborn twin son.

=== 18 years later ===
Faltu grew up in a feudal family in rural Rajasthan, being ill-treated and disregarded by everyone except her father and cousin Pratap for her gender, birth order, and passions. Rejecting the traditional role of a meek and homemaking woman, Faltu harbors a love for cricket, playing with various improvised bats like sticks and brooms, further drawing the mockery of the village while she fights against the stigma trying to make her family proud.

=== 5 months later ===
After 5 months, things change when Faltu crosses paths with Ayaan Mittal, who is the son of a wealthy CEO and a proficient cricketer despite swearing off the sport. He is visiting her village with his cousin Suhana for business. He notices her talent despite bad first impressions, and his offer of coaching her begins a new journey in her unacknowledged life.

Complications in their budding relationship loom as Ayaan is engaged to Tanisha in an arranged marriage among family friends back in Mumbai. Faltu must also resist an arranged marriage with an older man and many other social ills along the way. Ayaan comes and takes Faltu with him to Mumbai and takes her to his Paternal Aunt Rijwala. Pappi (Faltu's fianće) comes behind Faltu till Mumbai. Soon Ayaan's family invites Rijwala and her husband to Ayaan's wedding and Faltu also comes with them. Ayaan helps Faltu achieve her Dreams in Mumbai and sends her to Mumbai Women's National Cricket Academy. But unfortunately, one day when Faltu visits the doctor is informed that she has an illness that can cause blindness and she has only three months to see. She does not want Ayaan to know the truth and increase his troubles.

Suddenly one day everybody learns the truth that Ayaan eloped Faltu from her wedding and that he had gone mia from his pre-wedding rituals multiple times trying to help Faltu. They disapprove of Faltu staying with them. Faltu leaves the house and starts living on the streets and faces many harsh circumstances. On Ayaan's wedding day with Tanisha, Pappi discovers Faltu's whereabouts and kidnaps her. Pappi tries to forcefully marry Faltu but Ayaan learns that Faltu has been kidnapped and comes to save Faltu, but only after taking permission from Tanisha this time.

Ayaan gets injured, accidentally fills Faltu's hairline with vermillion, and falls unconscious. Soon Faltu also gets blind and cannot see anything. The police arrive and take Ayaan with them but Faltu runs away and hides in a jungle. Ayaan still asks the police for Faltu but they do not tell him anything. Ayaan arrives home and starts the rituals for marrying Tanisha. Tanisha also chooses to trust him and asks the police to locate Faltu seeing Ayaan worried, making him happy. Faltu meanwhile escapes the police as she wants to go away from Ayaan's life to not make his life difficult, but starts wearing vermillion and mangalsutra of Ayaan's name.

Tanisha soon learns about the truth with the help of Ayaan's cousin, Siddharth, who is insanely in love with the former. Suspecting and eventually growing envious, Tanisha begins plotting against Faltu, including creating distances and misunderstandings between her and Ayaan. During this, she gets framed for using unfair means to achieve her dreams and Ayaan learns of his marriage with Faltu. He then secretly tries to locate Faltu, who is missing. Faltu then enters the Mittal mansion as Rocky to learn who framed her. However, the truths are soon revealed and Tanisha is exposed in front of the family.

Ayaan soon realizes he is not happy in his marriage with Tanisha, and that he is in love with Faltu. Once the family learns of this, most of them disapprove of it. However, a series of events then lead to Tanisha and Ayaan divorcing.

On an event, Ayaan's father, Janardhan brutally humiliates Faltu's family for their status. Upon seeing the same, Ayaan takes a big decision and marries Faltu publicly with all rituals and legality. Facing unacceptance from the family, Ayaan stands by Faltu at all odds and begins her cricket training.

To take revenge, Tanisha then marries Siddharth thus re-entering the Mittal Mansion as Faltu's cousin-in-law. Bringing a shocker to Ayaan, Faltu, and the family, Tanisha vows to ruin their lives for the insult she faced.

Tanisha begins her revenge against the Mittals by using her mother, Kanika's contacts in order to take away their business. After usurping their business she plans to also sell the house so that Ayaan can come back to her but Ayaan and Faltu fight back by talking to their lawyers on how to get back their business.

Later, Tanisha informs the family that they should prepare as there is a party at home very soon and that she has a big surprise for Ayaan and Faltu. On the night of the party, Ayaan goes to the office to search for evidence in order to prove that Kanika and Tanisha are illegally usurping their property and that Sid and his mother are supporting them but gets locked in the document room while searching so Faltu goes to see him. After some time, Tanisha realizes that they are missing and orders everyone to search for them as her plan can not push through without Ayaan and Faltu.

Faltu manages to save Ayaan and they arrive back at the party so as to avoid being caught by Tanisha but during the party, Ayaan is arrested in a fraud case and taken to jail.

== Cast ==
=== Main ===
- Niharika Chouksey as Faltu Singh Mittal: Charan and Jamuna's youngest daughter; Lajwanti and Antima's sister; Pappi's ex-fiancee; Ayaan's wife (2022–2023)
- Aakash Ahuja as Ayaan Mittal: Savita and Prakash's son; Janardhan's step-son; Kinshuk's half-brother; Tanisha's ex-husband; Faltu's husband (2022–2023)

=== Recurring ===
==== Singhs ====
- Jaideep Singh as Charan Singh: Ratan's brother; Jamuna's husband; Lajwanti, Antima and Faltu's father (2022–2023)
- Monica Sharma as Jamuna Singh: Charan's wife; Lajwanti, Antima and Faltu's mother (2022–2023)
- Kajal Rathore as Lajwanti Singh: Jamuna and Charan's eldest daughter; Antima and Faltu's sister (2022–2023)
- Peehu Biswas as Antima Singh: Jamuna and Charan's second daughter; Lajwanti and Faltu's sister (2022–2023)
- Faiz Mohammad Khan as Ratan Singh: Charan's brother; Angoori's husband; Pratap and Som's father (2022–2023)
- Priyanka Rathod as Angoori Singh: Ratan's wife; Pratap and Som's mother (2022–2023)
- Darsh Kothari as Som Singh: Angoori and Ratan's elder son; Pratap's brother (2022–2023)
- Aaryan Shah as Pratap Singh: Angoori and Ratan's younger son; Som's brother (2022–2023)

==== Mittals ====
- Farida Venkat as Mayavati Thakur: Janardhan, Govardhan, Harshvardhan and Rijula's mother; Kinshuk, Siddharth and Suhana's grandmother; Ayaan's adoptive grandmother (2022–2023)
- Mahesh Thakur as Janardhan Mittal: Mayavati's eldest son; Govardhan, Harshvardhan and Rijula's elder brother; Savita's husband; Kinshuk's father; Ayaan's step-father (2022–2023)
- Vibhavari Pradhan as Savita Mittal: Janardhan's wife; Prakash former lover; Ayaan and Kinshuk's mother (2022–2023)
- Azhar J Malik as Kinshuk Mittal: Janardhan and Savita's son; Ayaan's younger half-brother; Ayesha's husband (2022–2023)
- Esha Pathak as Ayesha Mittal: Kinshuk's wife (2022–2023)
- Jiten Mukhi as Govardhan Mittal: Mayavati's second son; Janardhan's younger brother; Harshvardhan and Rijula's elder brother; Sumitra's husband; Siddharth's father (2022–2023)
- Rakhi Vijan as Sumitra Mittal: Govardhan's wife; Siddharth's mother (2022–2023)
- Rajat Verma as Siddharth "Sid" Mittal: Govardhan and Sumitra's son; Tanisha's estranged husband (2022–2023)
- Drishti Thakur as Tanisha Mittal: Kanika's estranged daughter; Ayaan's ex–wife and one-sided obsessive love interest; Siddharth's estranged wife (2022–2023)
- Rajeev Bhardwaj as Harshvardhan Mittal: Mayavati's youngest son; Janardhan and Govardhan's younger brother; Rijula's elder brother; Kumkum's husband; Suhana's father (2022–2023)
- Akshaya Bhingarde as Kumkum Mittal: Harshvardhan's wife; Suhana's mother (2022–2023)
- Myra Singh as Suhana Mittal: Harshvardhan and Kumkum's daughter (2022–2023)

==== Agarwals ====
- Jay Zaveri as Alok Agarwal: Rijula's husband (2022)
- Vibhuti Thakur as Rijula Mittal Agarwal: Mayavati's daughter; Janardhan, Govardhan and Harshvardhan's younger sister; Alok's wife (2022)

==== Others ====
- Thakur Rajveer Singh as Pappi: Faltu's ex-fiancé who is twice Faltu's age (2022-2023)
- Sonia Singh as Kanika: Tanisha's estranged mother; Janardhan's best friend (2022–2023)
- Pulkit Bangia as Neel: Brijmohan's grandson (2023)
- Anang Desai as Brijmohan: Neel's grandfather (2023)
- Saloni Sandhu as Shanaya Sachdeva: Ruhan's sister (2023)
- Sagar Wahi as Ruhan Sachdeva: Shanaya's brother (2023)

== Production ==
=== Casting ===
Niharika Chouksey was cast as the female lead, and later Aakash Ahuja was confirmed as the male lead.

=== Development ===
The series was announced by Boyhood Productions and confirmed in September 2022 by StarPlus. The shooting of the series began in September 2022 in Jaipur, India.

=== Release ===
The first promo was released on 30 September 2022, featuring the leads Niharika Chouksey and Aakash Ahuja. StarPlus released and promoted the show as a "unique story of an unwanted girl child."

=== Cancellation ===
Despite positive response from the audience, Faltu was slated to go off-air on 7 August 2023, to make way for Director's Kut Productions' Baatein Kuch Ankahee Si, however the show received an extension. The show finally went off-air on 20 August 2023.

== See also ==
- List of programmes broadcast by StarPlus
