= Housefull 4 (soundtrack) =

- Soundtrack album cover

Soundtrack album by Sohail Sen, Farhad Samji and Sandeep Shirodkar
- Released: 23 October 2019
- Recorded: 2018–19
- Studios: YRF (Mumbai); Future Sound of Bombay (Mumbai); Saba (Thiruvananthapuram); Songbird (Mumbai); Prasad Labs (Hyderabad)
- Genre: Feature film soundtrack
- Length: 17:35
- Language: Hindi
- Label: T-Series
- Producers: Sohail Sen; Aditya Dev

Sohail Sen chronology
Romeo Akbar Walter (2019)	Housefull 4 (2019)	Guns of Banaras (2020)

Sandeep Shirodkar chronology
Thackeray (2019)	Housefull 4 (2016)	Satellite Shankar (2019)

Singles from Housefull 4
- 1. "Ek Chumma" Released: 30 September 2019; 2. "Shaitan Ka Saala" Released: 7 October 2019; 3. "The Bhoot Song" Released: 16 October 2019; 4. "Chammo" Released: 21 October 2019

Housefull 4 is the soundtrack album to the 2019 Indian Hindi-language fantasy action comedy film of the same name, directed by Farhad Samji, starring Akshay Kumar, Riteish Deshmukh, Bobby Deol, Kriti Sanon, Pooja Hegde and Kriti Kharbanda in the lead roles. The film was produced by Sajid Nadiadwala under Nadiadwala Grandson Entertainment. The soundtrack was composed by Sohail Sen, Farhad Samji and Sandeep Shirodkar.

The film featured five tracks with lyrics written by Sameer Anjaan, Vayu, and Samji himself. The album was released by T-Series on 23 October 2019, two days before the film's release.

The music received positive reception from critics and audience. The tracks "Ek Chumma" and "Shaitan Ka Saala" topped the national charts, in all music and video platforms.

== Production ==
Sohail Sen who composed songs in Housefull 3 was signed as the lead music director. Farhad Samji, Sandeep Shirodkar and Panjabi Hit Squad was roped in as guest composers. Sameer Anjaan, Vayu, and Samji wrote lyrics for the songs. The music rights of the film were bagged by T-Series.

== Composition ==
The first single "Ek Chumma" was composed by Sohail Sen, who also produced the song. The song had the lyrics penned by Sameer Anjaan. The song was recorded by Altamash Faridi, Jyotica Tangri and Sohail Sen himself.

The second single "Shaitan Ka Saala" was the recreated version of "Bala Bala" by Tony Montana Music. After six months, the makers officially got the rights to remake the song. Sajid Nadiadwala revealed that approval of lyrics also took two months. The song was penned by Farhad Samji in 20 minutes. The song was composed by Sohail Sen, who also sung the song along with Vishal Dadlani.

"Bhoot Raja Bahar Aaja" composed by Laxmikant–Pyarelal and sung by Asha Bhosle for 1977 film Chacha Bhatija was recreated as "The Bhoot Song". The song was recreated by Farhad Samji and Sandeep Shirodkar. Signature music of the song was remixed from the song "Ammadu let's do Kummudu" composed by Devi Sri Prasad for the film Khaidi No. 150 (2017). The lyrics of the song was written by Farhad Samji and Vayu. The track was sung by Mika Singh and Samji himself.

The fourth single "Chammo" was composed and produced by Sohail Sen. The track was recorded by Sukhwinder Singh, Shreya Ghoshal, Shadaab Faridi, and Sen himself. The lyrics were penned by Sameer Anjaan.

The fifth track "Badla" was composed and written by Farhad Samji. The song's vocals were provided by Danish Sabri.

== Marketing and release ==
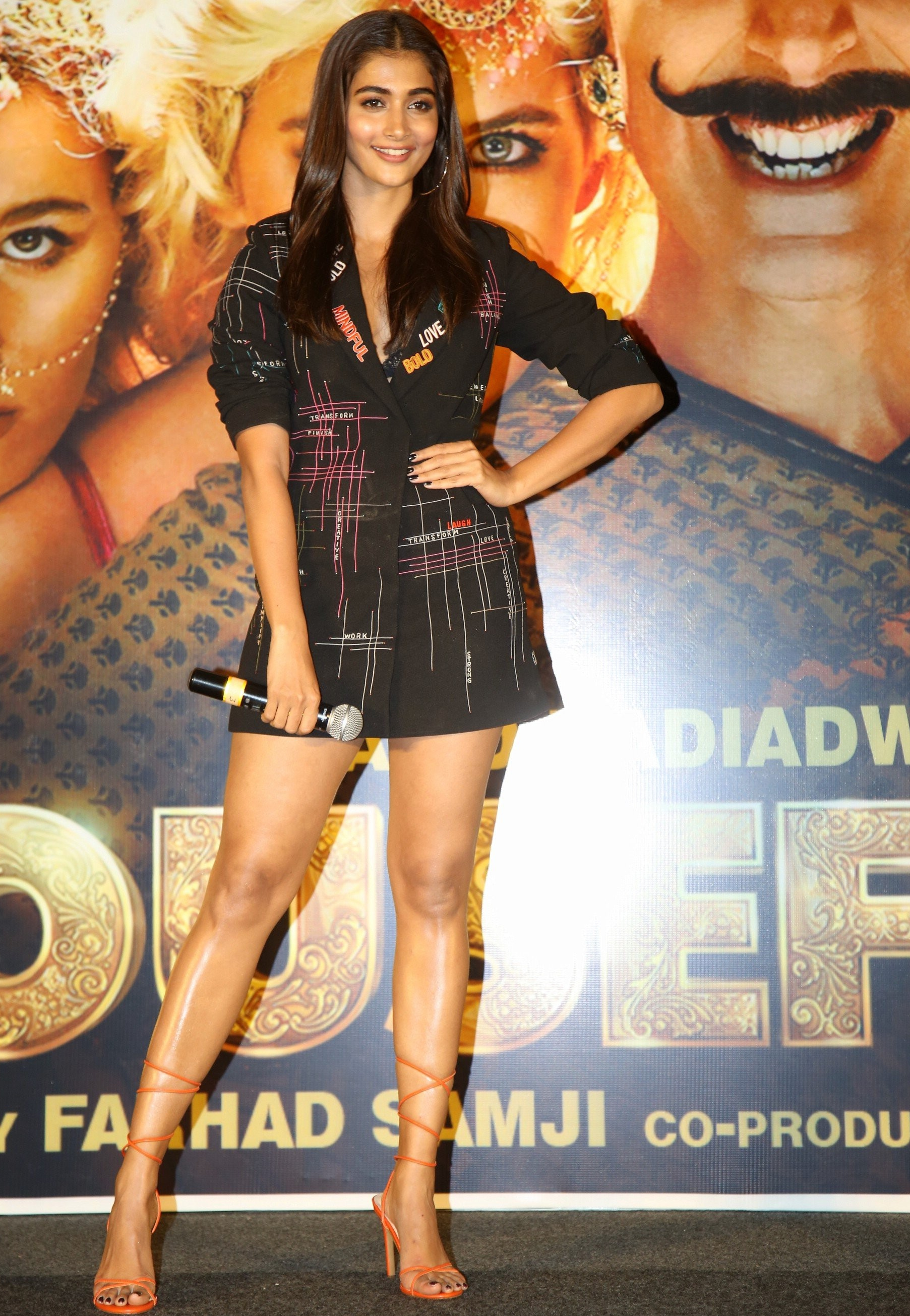
Pooja Hegde at "Shaitan Ka Saala" song launch

The teaser of the first single "Ek Chumma" was released on 28 September 2019. The song was released on 30 September 2020 on YouTube under T-Series record label. The second single titled "Shaitan Ka Saala"'s teaser was unveiled on 6 October 2019. On 7 October 2019, the song was released on all streaming platforms. The song launch event was held at Hyderabad, with Akshay Kumar, Kriti Sanon and Pooja Hegde launching the song.

On 15 October 2019, makers announced that the third song would release on 16 October. The third single "The Bhoot Song" was unveiled on 16 October 2019 by T-Series on YouTube. The fourth single "Chammo" was released on 21 October 2019. The fifth track "Badla" was released on 23 October 2019, along with the soundtrack album.

== Track listing ==
No.	Title	Lyrics	Music	Singer(s)	Length
1.	"Ek Chumma"	Sameer Anjaan	Sohail Sen	Sohail Sen, Altamash Faridi, Jyotica Tangri	4:04
2.	"Shaitan Ka Saala"	Farhad Samji	Sohail Sen	Vishal Dadlani, Sohail Sen	2:27
3.	"The Bhoot Song"	Farhad Samji, Vayu	Farhad Samji, Sandeep Shirodkar	Mika Singh, Farhad Samji	3:58
4.	"Chammo"	Sameer Anjaan	Sohail Sen	Sukhwinder Singh, Shreya Ghoshal, Shadaab Faridi, Sohail Sen	4:34
5.	"Badla"	Farhad Samji	Farhad Samji	Danish Sabri	2:32
Total length:					17:35

== Reception ==
The music received positive reception from critics and audience. Reviewing the soundtrack album, Joginder Tuteja of Bollywood Hungama rated album with 3 stars out of 5 and wrote "The music of Housefull 4 is just the kind that one expects from Housefull franchise. By and large it's the kind that goes with the pace of the narrative and stays along as the accompanying partner." Komal Nahta of Film Information wrote "Music (by Sohail Sen; guest composers Farhad Samji, Sandeep Shirodkar and Panjabi Hit Squad (U.K.)) is hit. The ‘Bala’, ‘Chhammo’ and ‘Ek chumma’ songs are very appealing. Lyrics (by Sameer Anjaan and Farhad Samji) are in synch with the mood of the film. Choreography (by Farah Khan, Ganesh Acharya and Chinni Prakash) is very eye-filling. Julius Packiam’s background music is impactful."

Monika Rawal Kukreja of Hindustan Times said "While Housefull 4 music is ordinary, the Ek Chumma song has been beautifully choreographed. Bala – Shaitaan Ka Saala is clearly the highlight with its lame yet catchy lyrics." Critics at the board of Bollywood Hungama wrote "Julius Packiam's background score is theatrical and the recurring theme is catchy."

Reviewing the soundtrack album, DJ Munks of BizAsia rated album with 3 stars out of 5 and wrote "The soundtrack of ‘Housefull 4’ is funny & cheesy no doubt! Limited by the appeal of the film there is only so much one can do to make the music fit with the film while also delivering on the listen ability parameters that define the success of the music album. Nonetheless the soundtrack is unique in the current times as it does not run after the typical remakes and dance and romantic numbers. It truly is a soundtrack for this film and fits well there keeping a different identity for itself."

Suparno Sarkar of International Business Times commented "Songs are entertaining." MovieCrow stated "The songs (composed by Sohail Sen and Farhad Samji-Sandeep Shirodkar) have already become popular and they suit the madness quotient evident in the film." Namrata Thakker of Rediff wrote "The best thing about Housefull 4 is the Bala song, which plays in the background throughout."

== Impact ==
The tracks "Ek Chumma" and "Shaitan Ka Saala" topped the national charts, in all music and video platforms. "Ek Chumma" inspired the song "Loota Re" from the Pakistani film Quaid-e-Azam Zindabad (2022). "Shaitan Ka Saala" was the 2019's fastest 100 million views gainer on YouTube, and emerged as the most popular song of 2019.
