= Shaitan Ka Saala =

2019 song by Sohail Sen, Vishal Dadlani and Farhad Samji

- Song cover

Single by Vishal Dadlani, Sohail Sen

from the album Housefull 4
- Language: Hindi
- Released: 7 October 2019
- Recorded: 2019
- Studio: YRF (Mumbai); Future Sound of Bombay (Mumbai); Saba (Thiruvananthapuram)
- Genre: Moombahton; dancehall; pop; Filmi
- Length: 2:27
- Label: T-Series
- Composer: Sohail Sen
- Lyricist: Farhad Samji
- Producer: Sohail Sen

Housefull 4 track listing
- 1. "Ek Chumma"; 2. "Shaitan Ka Saala"; 3. "The Bhoot Song"; 4. "Chammo"; 5. "Badla"

Music video
- "Shaitan Ka Saala" on YouTube

"Shaitan Ka Saala" is an Indian Hindi-language song, composed by Sohail Sen, who also sung the track with Vishal Dadlani. Lyrics were written by Farhad Samji for the soundtrack album of the 2019 Indian film Housefull 4. It was released on 6 October 2019, as the second single from the album, through T-Series. The song was the recreated version of "Bala Bala" by Tony Montana Music.

Upon release, the song received positive reviews by audience and critics. "Shaitan Ka Saala" was the 2019's fastest 100 million views gainer on YouTube, and emerged as the most popular song of 2019.

== Composition ==
Farhad Samji, who is also the director of Housefull 4 wrote the song in 20 minutes. Sohail Sen composed the track. Later it was recorded by Vishal Dadlani and Sen. The song was the recreated version of "Bala Bala" by Tony Montana Music. After six months, the makers officially got the rights to remake the song. Sajid Nadiadwala revealed that approval of lyrics also took two months. Earlier the song was supposed to remake for the film Bala (2019), but the plan was dropped as the makers didn't get the rights of the original track.

Music video choreographed by Ganesh Acharya was shot in eight hours. The video has 14th century settings.

== Marketing and release ==
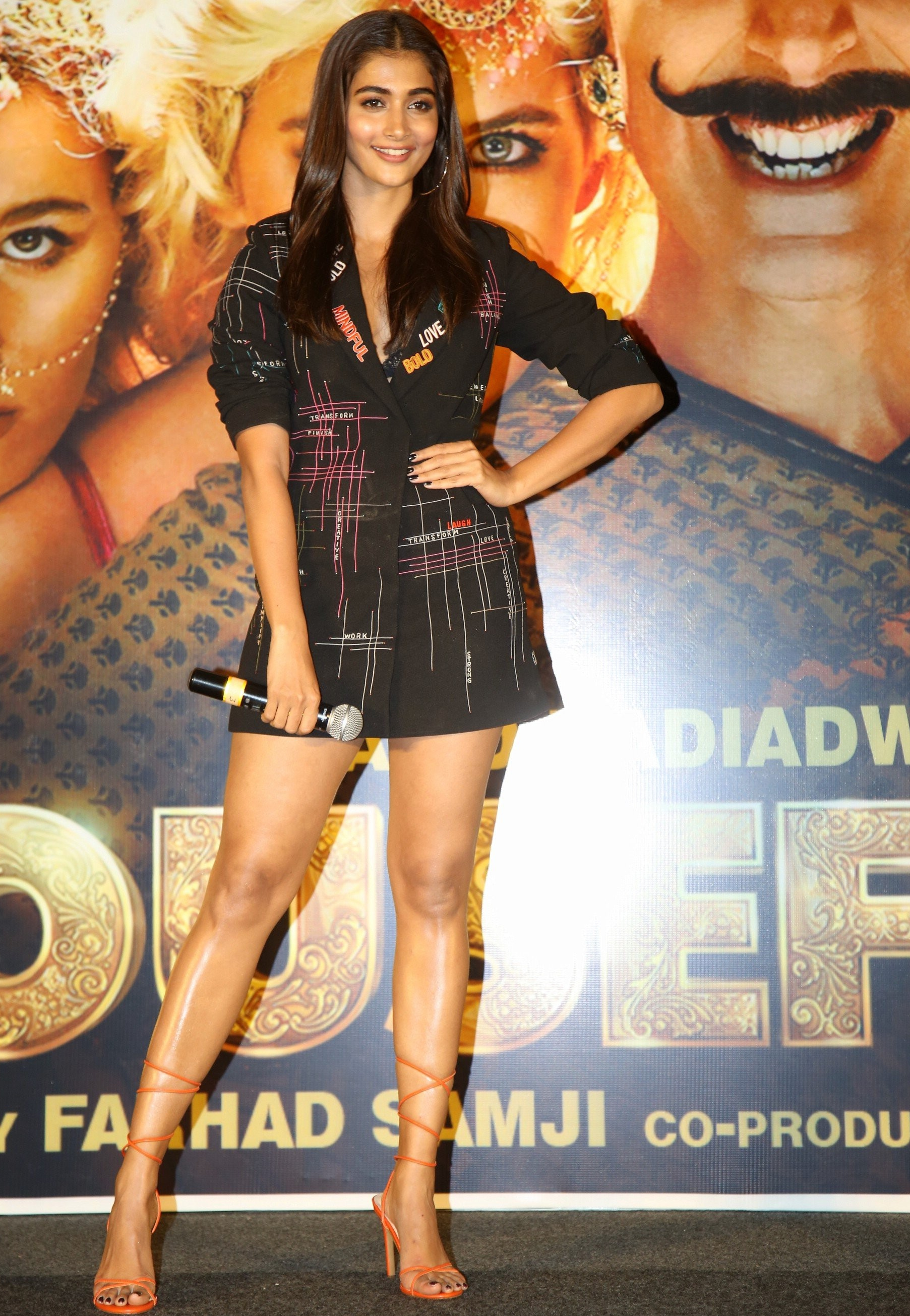
Pooja Hegde at "Shaitan Ka Saala" song launch

The teaser of "Shaitan Ka Saala" was unveiled by the makers on 6 October 2019. On 7 October 2019, the song was released on all streaming platforms. The song launch event was held at Hyderabad, with Akshay Kumar, Kriti Sanon and Pooja Hegde launching the song.

== Critical reception ==
Abhishek Singh of The Indian Express wrote "The refrain of “Bala” is matched by Sen and Dadlani calling out Farhad Samji’s simple lyrics. The song is a danceable and catchy one, but has little else going for it. Its simple beat and repetitive lyrics ensure that it is memorable but it is perhaps best to play in the background as you’re doing other things." Zarafshan Shiraz of India.com wrote "Akshay Kumar's Bala symbolises creepiness as he grooves like a scorpion in new track." Shaheen Irani of Daily News and Analysis wrote "the tunes by Sohail Sen make you want to listen to the song more. Lyrics by Farhad Samji deserve a special mention, since the lyrics, combined with the dance moves choreographed by Ganesh Acharya, are the highlights of the song. The sets and costume too work their magic, but it is hard to move your eyes from Akshay Kumar's antics to focus too much on them." A Hindustan Times critic wrote the song "run fast and loose in the lyrics department."

== Impact ==
Soon after the release, the song started trending on internet. "Shaitan Ka Saala" was the 2019's fastest 100 million views gainer on YouTube, and emerged as the most popular song of 2019. The song was well received by the audience. The "Bala Challenge" hookstep was trending on social media and was recreated by many, in many short-video and social media platforms. Ranveer Singh, Kareena Kapoor, Diljit Dosanjh, Kiara Advani Riteish Deshmukh, Ayushmann Khurrana, Varun Sharma, David Warner, Arjun Kapoor, Manish Paul, Varun Dhawan, Kriti Sanon, Raveena Tandon, Neeti Mohan, Shakti Mohan too recreated the hook-step.

== Credits and personnel ==
Credits adapted from YouTube.

- Sohail Sen – composer, vocal
- Farhad Samji – lyricist
- Vishal Dadlani
- Luke Toulson – vocal
- Ganesh Acharya – choreographer
- Yogesh Moore – shehnai
- Sameer Sen – rhythm arranger
- Eric Pillai – mix engineer, mastering engineer, programmer
- Nishad Bhatt – programmer

== Charts ==
Chart performances for "Shaitan Ka Saala"
Chart (2019)	Peak position
United Kingdom (Asian Music Chart Top 40)	29
