= Khelein Hum Jee Jaan Sey (soundtrack) =

Soundtrack album by Sohail Sen
- Released: 27 October 2010
- Recorded: 2009–2010; YRF Studios, Saba Studio; Mumbai, India
- Genre: Feature film soundtrack, Bengali folk, world music, rabindra sangeet, western classical music
- Length: 45:36
- Label: T-Series
- Producer: Sohail Sen

Sohail Sen chronology
What's Your Raashee? (2009)	Khelein Hum Jee Jaan Sey (2010)	Mere Brother Ki Dulhan (2011)

Khelein Hum Jee Jaan Sey is the soundtrack album to the 2010 period film of the same name, composed by Sohail Sen. The lyrics are penned by Javed Akhtar. The film is based on the book Do And Die by Manini Chatterjee, which is based on the Chittagong Uprising of 1930, directed by Ashutosh Gowariker. The album consists of twelve tracks; including five songs and seven background score cues. It was released on 27 October 2010 by T-Series.

== Production ==
The film's songs and film score were composed by Sohail Sen, who had worked on Ashutosh's previous film What's Your Raashee?. The lyrics are penned by Javed Akhtar. The music was launched on 27 October 2010. The official soundtrack consists of twelve tracks; including five songs and seven background score cues, some of which have been arranged and programmed by Simaab Sen. The title track has been sung by the pupils from Suresh Wadkar's music academy. Malayalam playback singer Ranjini Jose made her Bollywood debut through the song "Naiyn Tere". Composer Sohail Sen himself features as the voice of Surjya Sen, whilst Pamela Jain and Ranjini Jose features as the vocals of Kalpana Dutta and Pritilata Waddedar, respectively.

== Track listing ==
The complete track listing of the soundtrack was released on the same day of the music launch, on the film’s official Facebook page.

No.	Title	Artist(s)	Length
1	"Yeh Des Hai Mera"	Sohail Sen	5:40
2	"Naiyn Tere"	Pamela Jain, Ranjini Jose	4:44
3	"Khelein Hum Jee Jaan Sey"	Kids Chorus (Suresh Wadkar Ajivasan Music Academy)	4:42
4	"Sapne Saloney"	Sohail Sen, Pamela Jain	5:44
5	"Vande Mataram Revised" (Sanskrit into Hindi)	Chorus (Cine Singers Association Chorus Group)	4:16
	Background score cues
6	"Long Live Chittagong"	Violin, Sitar, Flute	1:49
7	"The Teenagers Whistle"	Whistle, Accordion, Flute, Sitar	4:05
8	"Surjya's Sorrow"	Flute, Strings section, Chorus	2:41
9	"Vande Mataram"	Chorus, Strings section	1:54
10	"The Escape"	Strings section, Chorus	3:24
11	"Naiyn Tere" (Sad)	Pamela Jain, Flute, Sitar, Chorus, Strings section	2:31
12	"Revolutionary Comrades"	Strings section, Chorus	3:28

== Reception ==
Professional ratings
Review scores
Source	Rating
Bollywood Hungama	3/5 stars
Music Aloud	8.5/10 stars
Rediff	3.5/5 stars

The soundtrack album met with generally positive reviews from the critics. Bollywood Hungama, rated the album 3 out of 5 and quoted it as "Music here is not bad by any means but it is not instant coffee" and overall "Khelein Hum Jee Jaan Sey is a good quality album". Rediff.com gave the album 3.5 out of 5 and said "The soundtrack of Khelein Hum Jee Jaan Sey lends an inexplicable satisfaction that comes from seeing a movie". Music Aloud said, "Seeing that Gowariker already had Lagaan, Sohail Sen ran a serious risk of falling under Lagaan's shadow in Khelein Hum Jee Jaan Sey, but he has come out wonderfully, even shaking off What's Your Raashee? blues in the process. Hat's off!", giving it 8.5 out of 10.

== Album credits ==
=== Musicians ===
- Sivamani – drums, percussions
- Sunil Das – sitar
- Ulhas Bapat – santoor
- Naveen, Ashwin Shrinivasan – flute
- Jeetendra Thakur – violin
- Pradeepta Sen Gupta, Chandrakant Lakshapati – banjo
- Pratap Rath, Suresh Soni, Nirmal Mukharji, Shivanand Bangar – rhythm
- Suraj Sathe – accordion
- Levin D'Costa – whistle
- Cine Musicians Association, Mumbai – strings section

=== Production ===
- Producer: Sohail Sen
- Recording Engineer: Shantanu Hudlikar
- Assistant Engineer: Nitish Kumar
- Recorded at: YRF Studios by Shantanu Hudlikar, Saba Studio by Rafiq Sen
- Mastered by: Aditya Modi at Premier Digital Mastering Studios, Mumbai
- Pro-Tools Engineer: Abhishek Khandelwal
- Logic Pro & Nuendo Engineer: Rafiq Sen
- Mixed at: Saba Studio by Sohail Sen
- Arranger: Prakash Peters
- Additional Programming: Simaab Sen, Rajeev Bhatt
- Rhythm Conductor: Sanjeev Sen
- Music co-ordination: Ramanand Shetty, Sheshappa T. Poojari
- Music Editor: Rafiq Sen
