= Ranviir the Marshal =

- Directed by: Milind Ukey
- Produced by: Alok Rajan Sharma
- Starring: Rishy; Rati Agnihotri; Rajesh Khattar; Shibani Kashyap
- Production company: Cine Act 1 Productions
- Release date: October 23, 2015
- Language: Hindi

Ranviir the Marshal is a 2015 Indian action film based on martial arts produced by Alok Rajan Sharma under his production house Cine Act 1 Productions and directed by Milind Ukey. It stars Rishy and Ramnitu Chaudhary in lead roles. It also stars reputed actors like Rati Agnihotri, Rajesh Kattar and Shibani Kashyap. The film is about a young man constantly plagued with disturbing dreams involving a martial arts hero fighting for truth, justice and courage.

== Plot ==
The protagonist of the movie, Ranviir (Rishy) lives alone with his mother Ayesha (Rati Agnihotri). The mother and son share a close bond and are generally content with their simple life. Ayesha is a strong woman and is extremely determined to shield her son from harm's way for as long as she can.

However Ranviir is intermittently plagued by dreams involving a martial arts hero fighting for truth and justice. Ranviir initially does share his disturbing dreams with Ayesha who is quick to dismiss them as a result of his ardent following of action movies. Although he does not completely believe her, he is compelled to drop the topic as he knows that inquiring too much against her will, will not prove fruitful. It is obvious that there is some dreadful reason behind Ranviir's violent dreams but Ayesha does not tell him the truth as she fears for his well-being. Ranviir suffers from an inherent streak of uncontrolled rage and so Ayesha tries to keep him away from pursuing martial arts by generally involving him in day-to-day chores and activities thereby keeping him occupied.

However, as Ranviir starts attending college, he starts interacting with varied people and varied opinions from the outside world, a world from which his mother had successfully alienated him until now. Ranviir on the very first day of his college finds himself challenged into a fight by Karan, while trying to protect the juniors from Karan's relentless and ruthless ragging. He also meets a girl Simran (Ramnitu Chaudhary) and finds his life taking a new turn. They eventually fall in love. In the natural course of events, he befriends Karan and they strike a lasting friendship. Realizing his natural inclination for it, Simran and Karan persuade Ranviir to pursue formal training in Taekwondo. Although initially reluctant, Raviir finally relents but decides to keep his mother in the dark about it.

Unfortunately, one day Ayesha finds out about Ranviir's Taekwondo training and gets extremely distressed. When Ranviir realizes that his actions have really hurt his mother, he decides to give up his training and assures her that he will stay away from martial arts. But that is not to be. Because as they say, 'What is meant to be, will always be.' Even Ayesha realizes that Taekwondo is Ranviir's true calling. She then takes him to meet a senior renowned mystical martial arts guru called Guru Bodhi Dharma. This eventually leads him to his final destiny and the secret Ayesha has guarded all her life from him.

The film features eight types of authentic martial art forms and has eight international fighters.

== Cast ==
- Rishy as Ranviir
- Rati Agnihotri as Ayesha
- Rajesh Khattar as Rana
- Shibani Kashyap as Sheena
- Ramnitu Chaudhary as Simran
- Prateek Parmar as Karan
- Robin Das as Maha Guru
- Vishwajeet Pradhan as Jampa
- Nisha Parmar as Tanya

== Marketing ==
The trailer of the film hit the theaters on 2 October 2015.

== Release ==
The film's theatrical release was on 23 October 2015.

== Soundtrack ==
The soundtrack for the movie has been composed by Ricky Mishra, Jaidev, and Ramji Gulati and sung by Kunal Ganjawala, Shibani Kashyap, Akriti Kakar and KK.

- Its Time To Fight - Rishy, Ramji Gulati, Shibani Kashyap
- Saware Naino Mein - Kunal Ganjawala, Akriti Kakkar
- Kisne Yu Mujh Ko - KK
- Munde Nave Nave - Jaidev Kumar, Rituraj, Vaishnavi Shetty
