= Bathroom Singer =

- Presented by: Gaurav Gera
- Starring: Ravi Kishan; Shibani Kashyap
- Opening theme: "Bathroom Singer"
- Country of origin: India
- Original language: Hindi

Production
- Camera setup: Multi-camera
- Running time: 52 minutes

Original release
- Network: Filmy
- Release: August 2007 – December 2007

Bathroom Singer is a reality television show on Sahara Filmy, named after the concept of bathroom singing. Ravi Kishan and Shibani Kashyap were the judges of the show. The show focussed more on the entertainment factor of the participants than on their singing talent.
