= Sirf (film) =

- DVD cover
- Directed by: Rajaatesh Nayar
- Written by: Rajaatesh Nayar; Shashikant Verma
- Produced by: Sanjay Kotadia; Kanu Patel
- Starring: Kay Kay Menon; Manisha Koirala; Ranvir Shorey; Sonali Kulkarni
- Cinematography: Baba Azmi
- Music by: Sohail Sen; Shibani Kashyap
- Distributed by: Pyramid Saimira
- Release date: 25 April 2008
- Country: India
- Language: Hindi
- Budget: ₹3 crore
- Box office: ₹55,50 lakh

Sirf....Life looks greener on the other side is a 2008 Indian Hindi-language drama film directed by Rajaatesh Nayar. It is based around four couples from different strata of life. It is about how each couple feels that the other couple's life is better than theirs. It tries to portray the lifestyle of people in metro. The movie comes under the banner of Seven Eagles productions. It is produced by Sanjay Kotadia, Ghanshyam Patel, Kanu Patel. After working with Rajkumar Santoshi as an assistant director for China Gate, Pukar and Lajja, this is the first film as director for Rajaatesh Nayar.

The movie revolves around four couples starring Manisha Koirala, Ranvir Shorey, Kay Kay Menon, Sonali Kulkarni, Parvin Dabbas, Rituparna Sengupta.

== Plot ==
Mumbai, the commercial capital of India, is a city that never sleeps. Rapidly changing at a feverish pace with every passing second, it is always on the move, and so are the people living in it. In this story, we gain insight into the lives of the people living in this city and how the pace of the city affects their relationships and how they deal with it. No matter what happens, life has to go on.

This is also the story of four couples and their lives in a metropolitan city. They belong to different social and financial strata, and everyone has their own problems to deal with. What one couple has, the other doesn't. Each couple looks at the other couple and wishes that if only they had what the other couple has, their life would be a bed of roses, be it on a monetary level or moral terms. What seems to be a major and almost insoluble problem for the first couple is just a petty issue for the second. Similarly, the second couple's serious problem is not looked upon as a problem at all by the first, and likewise with the other two couples. In a pursuit to achieve what they lack and in a desperate search for that one thing that would solve all their problems, they find themselves lost in the ever-moving crowd, where no one has time for themselves, leaving aside the cares of the world.

In due course of time, all four couples come together with a distant vision of that one event which would end all their problems and set them free. Is it reality or just a figment of their vivid imagination?

== Cast ==
- Kay Kay Menon as Gaurav Sharma
- Manisha Koirala as Devika Kapoor
- Ranvir Shorey as Akash Malhotra
- Sonali Kulkarni as Namita Bedi
- Parvin Dabbas as Amit Shukla
- Rituparna Sengupta as Suchita
- Ankur Khanna as Rahul Kher
- Nauheed Cyrusi as Shalu
- Kanisha Nayyar as Kittu

== Soundtrack ==
Sirf

Soundtrack album by Sohail Sen and Shibani Kashyap
- Released: 2008
- Recorded: 2005–2006
- Genre: Feature film soundtrack
- Length: 41:45
- Label: Sony Music
- Producer: Sohail Sen

Sohail Sen chronology
| Sirf (2008) | What's Your Raashee? (2009) |

Shibani Kashyap chronology
| Waisa Bhi Hota Hai Part II (2003) | Sirf (2008) | Main Osama |

Professional ratings
Review scores
| Source | Rating |
|---|---|
| Bollywood Hungama | 1.5/5 stars |

The soundtrack of the film is composed by Sohail Sen and Shibani Kashyap. The lyrics are penned by Mehboob and Vipul Saini. The album contains six original tracks and one reprise track.

Track listing
| No. | Title | Artist(s) | Length |
|---|---|---|---|
| 1. | "Pehla Woh Pyaar" | Kunal Ganjawala | 5:01 |
| 2. | "Life Peeche Peeche" | Shibani Kashyap | 3:41 |
| 3. | "Ghar Tera Ghar Mera" | Shaan, Shreya Ghoshal | 5:25 |
| 4. | "Zindagi Ki Kahani" | Kunal Ganjawala | 5:37 |
| 5. | "Tujhpe Fida" | Tarannum, Sohail Sen | 5:43 |
| 6. | "Khel Jo Khele" | Vinod Rathod | 5:12 |
| 7. | "Mumbai Nagariya" | KK, Tarannum | 5:33 |
| 8. | "Zindagi Ki Kahani" (II) | Kunal Ganjawala, Pamela Jain | 5:33 |
| Total length: | | | 41:45 |
