= What's Your Raashee? (soundtrack) =

Soundtrack album by Sohail Sen
- Released: 9 September 2009
- Recorded: 2008 – 2009; Studio Nysa, YRF Studios, Saba Studio; Mumbai, India
- Genres: Feature film soundtrack, Indian conventional music, jazz, pop, R&B, hip-hop, electronic, soft rock, retro, Gujarati folk, Rajasthani folk, western classical music
- Length: 57:58
- Label: Sony Music India
- Producers: Sohail Sen, Rajeev Bhatt

Sohail Sen chronology
Sirf (2008)	What's Your Raashee? (2009)	Khelein Hum Jee Jaan Sey (2010)

What's Your Raashee? is the soundtrack album to the 2009 romantic comedy film of the same name. The soundtrack is composed by Sohail Sen and the lyrics are penned by Javed Akhtar. It was released by Sony Music India on 9 September 2009 and upon release, the soundtrack received positive reviews from music critics, who commended Sen's musicianship and vocal ability.

== Development ==
There was a speculation that the soundtrack of What's Your Raashee? was going to be composed by the Academy Award winner, A. R. Rahman, but soon afterwards, director Ashutosh Gowariker announced that he would be hiring newcomer, Sohail Sen to compose the soundtrack of the movie. The track listing for the soundtrack took more than one and a half years to be finalised. The album consists of thirteen songs, which is made up of twelve songs for each zodiac sign representing the characters played by Priyanka Chopra, and one introductory song. Sen has lent his voice for nine out of the thirteen songs in addition to composing the soundtrack.

== Track listing ==
No.	Title	Artist(s)	Length	Zodiac Song
1	"What's Your Raashee? - Pal Pal Dil Jisko Dhoonde"	Sohail Sen	03:58	Aries/Mesh (Anjali)
2	"Jao Na"	Sohail Sen, Tarannum Mallik	04:45	Aquarius/Kumbh (Sanjana)
3	"Aaja Lehraate"	Shaan, Bhavya Pandit	03:50	Gemini/Mithun (Kajal)
4	"Bikhri Bikhri"	Sohail Sen, Marianne D'Cruz	04:41	Cancer/Kark (Hansa)
5	"Maanunga Maanunga"	Ashutosh Gowarikar, Pamela Jain	03:51	Libra/Tula (Rajni)
6	"Sau Janam"	Udit Narayan, Madhushree, Sohail Sen	04:22	Pisces/Meen (Chandrika)
7	"Dhadkan Dhadkan"	Sohail Sen, Tarannum Mallik	05:03	Leo/Simha (Mallika)
8	"Aa Le Chal"	Aslesha Gowarikar, Harman Baweja	02:59	Scorpio/Vrishchik (Nandini)
9	"Pyaari Pyaari"	Alka Yagnik, Sohail Sen	04:47	Virgo/Kanya (Pooja)
10	"Su Chhe"	Sohail Sen, Bela Shende	04:23	Taurus/Vrishabh (Vishakha)
11	"Salone Kya"	Sohail Sen, Tarannum Mallik	03:48	Sagittarius/Dhanu (Bhavna)
12	"Koi Jaane Na"	Rajab Ali Bharti, Bela Shende	04:43	Capricorn/Makar (Jhankhna)
13	"What's Your Raashee? - Chehre Jo Dekhe Hain"	Sohail Sen	05:34	All the twelve girls and Yogesh

== Reception ==
Professional ratings
Review scores
Source	Rating
Bollywood Hungama	4/5 stars
Planet Bollywood	8.5/10 stars

Although the response to the feature film itself was negative, the soundtrack has been able to gain mainly positive reviews. The Song "Jao Na" was a chartbuster, and was popular among the audiences. Bollywood Hungama praises Sohail Sen and Javed Akhtar for their work and quoted the album as "interestingly done" and "an experience not to be missed". The album received an overall rating of four out of five stars. Ankit Ojha from Planet Bollywood called it "A Musical Extravaganza!". BBC Music said "Sen shows he can successfully compete with the best in Bollywood".

== Album credits ==
=== Musicians ===
- Sunil Daas – sitar
- Bilshad Khan – sarangi
- Kishore Singh – ravan hattha
- Iqbal Warshi – taar shehnai
- P.M.K. Naveen Kumar, K.Srinivasan, Parasnath – flute
- Sumit Mitra – accordion
- Pawan Rasaily, Ankur Mukherjee, Chintoo Singh, Tushar Parte – guitar
- Rashid Khan – bulbul tarang
- Gino Banks, Ankeet Bham – drums
- Pratap Rath, Shadab Roshan – percussion
- Ritu Raj – tenor sax
- Joseph M. – trumpet
- Nirmal Mukherjee, Suresh Soni, Pradeep Lad, Ram Prakash K, Raju Sardar, Aziz Khan, Yusuf Moh’d, Aslam Dafrani, Iqbal Langa, Anoop Shankar, Hafeez Ahmed Khan, Roshan Ali, Sanjeev Vyas, Sharafat Khan – rhythm
- Pradeep Sen Gupta, Chandrakant L – mandolin
- Cine Musician Association, Mumbai – strings

=== Production ===
- Producer: Sohail Sen
- Recording Engineers: R. Muralidhar, Aditya Modi, Shantanu Hudlikar, Abhishek Khandelwal, Rafiq Sen
- Mixing: R. Muralidhar
- Mastering: Shadab Rayeen, Aditya Modi
- Additional Programming: Simaab Sen, Santosh Mulekar, Praful Keluskar, Shreeram Iyer
- Music co-ordination: Ramanand Shetty, Sheshappa T. Poojari
- Music Design & Production: Rajeev Bhatt
- Rhythm Conduction: Sanjeev Sen

Credits adapted from the liner notes of What's Your Raashee?.
