= What's Your Raashee? =

2009 film by Ashutosh Gowariker

- Theatrical release poster
- Directed by: Ashutosh Gowariker
- Written by: Screenplay: Naushil Mehta; Ashutosh Gowariker; Dialogues: Naushil Mehta; Amit Mistry; Tapan A. Bhatt
- Based on: Kimball Ravenswood by Madhu Rye
- Produced by: Ronnie Screwvala; Sunita A. Gowariker
- Starring: Harman Baweja; Priyanka Chopra
- Cinematography: Piyush Shah
- Edited by: Ballu Saluja
- Music by: Sohail Sen
- Production companies: UTV Motion Pictures; Ashutosh Gowariker Productions
- Distributed by: UTV Motion Pictures
- Release date: 25 September 2009
- Running time: 211 minutes
- Country: India
- Language: Hindi
- Budget: ₹32 crore
- Box office: ₹17 crore

What's Your Raashee? (lit. 'What's Your Zodiac Sign?') is a 2009 Indian Hindi-language romantic comedy film written and directed by Ashutosh Gowariker and produced by Ronnie Screwvala and Sunita A. Gowariker. Based on the Gujarati novel Kimball Ravenswood by the playwright and novelist Madhu Rye, the film stars Harman Baweja and Priyanka Chopra, with Darshan Jariwala and Dilip Joshi in supporting roles, and follows the story of Yogesh Patel (Baweja), a Gujarati NRI, who must marry in ten days to save his brother from harm; Yogesh agrees to meet twelve potential brides (all played by Chopra), one from each zodiac sign.

Gowariker had always aspired to make a romantic comedy and was inspired to adapt Rye's novel into a feature film after watching a play based on the same source material. Later, he bought the rights and co-wrote the screenplay with playwright Naushil Mehta. In the process, several plot changes were made for the cinematic adaptation, notably the similarity between the twelve girls, and the ending. Since Gowariker was against using prosthetics to create the twelve characters, Chopra worked on her body language and her voice to make them distinct. Principal photography was extensively done at sixty-seven locations across Mumbai, and partly in Baroda and Chicago. The soundtrack, consisting of thirteen songs, each representing an astrological sign and one compilation, was composed by newcomer Sohail Sen replacing Gowariker's frequent collaborator A. R. Rahman, with lyrics by Javed Akhtar.

The film's master copy was stolen from Adlabs before its release, and a few days later was recovered by the police, who found and seized several pirated copies of the film created from the master copy. The film had its world premiere at the 2009 Toronto International Film Festival and was released on 25 September 2009. With a box office gross ₹17 crore, it was unsuccessful and received mixed reviews, with criticism for its over three-and-a-half-hour run time and its screenplay. However, the film garnered acclaim for its soundtrack and Chopra's performance, which received a nomination for the Screen Award for Best Actress. She also became the first actress in history to portray twelve roles in one film, a feat considered for inclusion in the Guinness World Records.

== Plot ==
Deep within a quaint rural village, an elderly man receives a card in the mail from his youngest grandson, Yogesh Patel (Harman Baweja). Over in Mumbai, Yogesh's family consults an astrologer to learn if their eldest son, Jitendra "Jitu" Patel (Dilip Joshi), a debtor, will go to jail, and also gives him Yogesh's birthdate to learn his future. They are astonished to hear that Yogesh will inherit a fortune if he is married on the 20th of that month; the phone rings, and the family is overjoyed to hear that Yogesh's grandfather has made him his sole heir.

Yogesh is successful and lives in Chicago. He gets a text message from Jitu that his father Bharat (Anjan Srivastav) had a heart attack, and rushes to Mumbai. When he arrives, Yogesh learns that Jitu had lied to him about Bharat, but that Jitu owes a rich man 25 million rupees for gambling debts; if Yogesh does not marry on the 20th of the month, Jitu will go to jail. At first Yogesh is adamant he will not marry, but Jitu tells him that he also borrowed 15 million rupees from a mob boss; his parents are unaware of this. Yogesh is annoyed, but agrees to marry after the gangster threatens them. Yogesh's uncle, Devu (Darshan Jariwala), subsequently posts a matrimonial ad with Yogesh's photo, and 176 girls reply. Yogesh decides that he will meet one girl from each zodiac sign. Meanwhile, Devu's wife Kanta asks Bharat to hire a detective – she suspects that Devu is cheating on her. When Bharat learns that the astrologer is also a detective, he hires him. The detective identifies Devu's mistress as a woman named Anila Kamdar.

After Yogesh has met most of the girls, one of them, Sanjana, asks to talk to him privately. She says to him that a boy has agreed to marry her, but she is reluctant. She asks Yogesh to give her time to decide what to do about her boyfriend. He agrees, telling her about his problems with Jitu. Sanjana, touched that Yogesh will help her despite his own problems, hugs him. Devu walks in, and thinks he has interrupted them; Sanjana chases him, trying to explain. Tailing Devu, the detective is unaware that he had been with Anila at a hotel and sees him with Sanjana. Sanjana shows Devu a picture; when he says something supposedly demeaning, she becomes angry and tries to leave. Devu stops her, holding her while she cries before they leave in his car. The detective convinces Yogesh and his father that Devu is having an affair with Sanjana. Anila then comes downstairs, looking for Devu. Yogesh shows her the photos, telling her that Devu and Sanjana went to Khandala, a hill station near Mumbai. The detective tells Kanta this story, and they find Devu at a hotel with Sanjana. Devu thinks Yogesh betrayed him, and Yogesh thinks Devu is having an affair with Sanjana.

After seeing the last girl, Yogesh's mother Shakuntala beseeches him to choose with his heart instead of his mind. Yogesh sees all of the girls in a dream, and in the morning decides who he will marry. He goes to Rajni's office because she offered a 50-million-rupee dowry, and is relieved to discover that she is marrying someone else. Yogesh goes to Devu's house to tell him he wants to marry Vishakha, but Devu calls her and rejects her. He says there is no need for Yogesh to marry her; he knows about Jitu's debt, and says he will choose Yogesh's bride himself.

Yogesh is impatient, but Devu keeps the bride a secret. When she enters, Yogesh cannot tell who she is. When the ceremony ends, Devu welcomes the father of the bride: Sanjana's father. Yogesh is stunned when his grandfather brings the money to pay Jitu's debts. He asks Devu how he arranged the marriage; Devu explains that when Sanjana followed him and showed him a picture of her boyfriend, he remembered seeing the boyfriend kissing another woman in Khandala. He brought Sanjana to a hotel in Khandala to confront her boyfriend. Sanjana told him she would marry Yogesh, having realised that she loves him. The film ends with the marriage attendants asking Sanjana's astrological sign. Sanjana asks Yogesh what her raashee is, to which he says he does not know, and smiles.

== Cast and characters ==
=== Cast ===
The cast is listed below:

- Priyanka Chopra in 12 roles
- Harman Baweja as Yogesh Patel
- Anjan Srivastav as Bharatbhai Patel
- Manju Singh as Shakuntala Patel
- Dilip Joshi as Jitendra "Jitu" Patel
- Ajita Kulkarni as Jyotsna Bhabhi
- Visswa Badola as Pragji, Yogesh's Grandfather
- Darshan Jariwala as Devendra "Devu" Patel
- Bhairavi Vaidya as Kantaben Patel
- Geeta Tyagi as Anila Kamdar
- Rajesh Vivek as Bhautesh Joshi
- Yuri Suri as Moolraj Bhai
- Daya Shankar Pandey as Chaand
- Marcell D'souza as Suraj
- Pramod Moutho as Indravadan Zaveri
- Terence Lewis as Stage Dancer

=== Characters ===
The character description for each of the characters played by Priyanka Chopra in a twelve roles is listed below:

Character name	Astrological sign	Traits	Description	Song
Anjali Patel (12 April)	Mesh (Aries)	Awkward, good-hearted and underconfident	A non-native English speaker, she tries too hard to impress Yogesh.; Though innocent, she fakes her personality to appear as a modern girl, who could suit an NRI.	"What's Your Raashee?"
Sanjana Shah (12 February)	Kumbh (Aquarius)	Charming, graceful	An NRI and microbiologist by profession, she and Yogesh have a lot in common.; She asks Yogesh to reject her so she could marry her boyfriend, but ultimately decides to marry Yogesh upon realizing her love for him.	"Jao Naa"
Kajal Khakhar (12 June)	Mithun (Gemini)	Vivacious, fun-loving, and argumentative	A college student who is a die-hard romantic, she likes Yogesh.; Although both hit it off and agree to marry, she wants to wait a year to fall in love before marriage.	"Aaja Lehrate"
Hansa Parekh (12 July)	Kark (Cancer)	Quiet, traditional, emotional	An honest, well-educated girl who has been unlucky in love as she admits that she is not a virgin, but was sworn to secrecy by her family.; Not over her previous relationship, she tells Yogesh she would be a good wife but cannot assure him she will love him unconditionally.	"Bikhri Bikhri"
Rajni Parmar (12 October)	Tula (Libra)	Dominating	A successful architect by profession, she is strict and workaholic.; She sees marriage as a contract and Yogesh is shocked by her pre-nuptial agreement	"Maanunga Maanunga"
Chandrika Khushaldas (12 March)	Meen (Pisces)	Soft-spoken, traditional, and naive	Daughter of a rich jeweller, she is timid and believes in reincarnation.; Possessive about Yogesh, she thinks that he was her soulmate in the previous life and remembers things from her previous life.	"Sau Janam"
Mallika Desai (12 August)	Simha (Leo)	Elegant, quick-tempered and strong	A successful dancer and an NGO employee, she thinks an artist can understand another artist, since Yogesh also has interest in music.; She rejects Yogesh after he unintentionally offends her by talking about an unhygienic street food in India.	"Dhadkan Dhadkan"
Nandini Jassani (12 November)	Vrishchik (Scorpio)	Passionate, ambitious	She hides her true self from her family to appear as a simple girl.; She sees the marriage as a ticket to pursue her modelling aspirations in Chicago.	"Aa Le Chal"
Pooja Goradia (12 September)	Kanya (Virgo)	Dedicated, caring and loving	A caring physician who helps the underprivileged.; She and Yogesh both fall for each other but adamant about not wanting to settle abroad.	"Pyaari Pyaari"
Vishakha "Dolly" Zaveri (12 May)	Vrishabh (Taurus)	Energetic, fun-loving, friendly.	The daughter of a wealthy cotton industrialist, she pretends to be immature to see if Yogesh is only interested in her wealth.; Unaware of her true intention, Yogesh is uncertain about her.	"Su Chhe"
Bhavna Shukla (12 December)	Dhanu (Sagittarius)	Religious, superstitious and sexual	An expert in astrology and spiritual in nature, she talks about sex in the first meeting with Yogesh.; Relies on stars and horoscopes, and realises she and Yogesh are incompatible; tries unsuccessfully to seduce him.	"Salone Kya"
Jhankhana Basu (12 January)	Makar (Capricorn)	Nervous and aloof	A fifteen-year-old girl who wants education.; Belonging from a poor family, her family hides her age, so she could marry Yogesh in order to settle her several sisters.	"Koi Jaane Na"

== Production ==
=== Development ===
Ashutosh Gowariker had always aspired to make a comedy; however, after making the historical drama Jodhaa Akbar (2008), he wanted to make a "frothy" romance or "something non-historical, light and fun". He had always wanted to make a romantic comedy along the lines of It's a Wonderful Life (1946), Roman Holiday (1953), Chupke Chupke (1975), Baaton Baaton Mein (1979), or When Harry Met Sally... (1989). Gowariker wanted to do a film that would require less research compared to his previous films as he felt he did not have "to go into historical details. But a good comedy is a challenge of its own. The process of arriving at the humour is extremely difficult."

After watching the play A Suitable Bride based on Madhu Rye's Gujarati novel Kimball Ravenswood, Gowariker decided to adapt it into a film. He read the source material to learn more about it and then bought the novel's film rights. In an interview, Rye revealed that he did not agree with Gowariker's description of the novel as a "frothy romance". Rye said that the novel can be considered a cunningly crafted sex thriller driven by devilish characters while also being both a "side-splitting tingly comic" story as well as "a profound study of human nature." Gowariker co-wrote the screenplay with playwright Naushil Mehta. When asked if he was worried that the writers would make drastic changes in the adaptation, Rye replied: "I hope they do." Due to the length of the novel, several changes were made with Rye's permission.

The ending was altered by the writers; the protagonist chooses a completely different girl in the film than the one he selects in the novel. Rye was concerned about the reactions of viewers who had read the novel, and it took Gowariker a while to convince him to agree. The writers were highly impressed and relieved by the characters' fine detailing in the novel, adding: "The written matter was very strong and we had to just get a few layers on that." While writing the screenplay, Mehta and Gowariker decided to have one song for each zodiac sign to bring out the personality of each sign and its related girl. They had to write each character with different nuances. The title of the film is taken from a fictional book, What's Your Raashee?, about the compatibility between the sun signs, which the protagonist reads in the film.

=== Casting ===
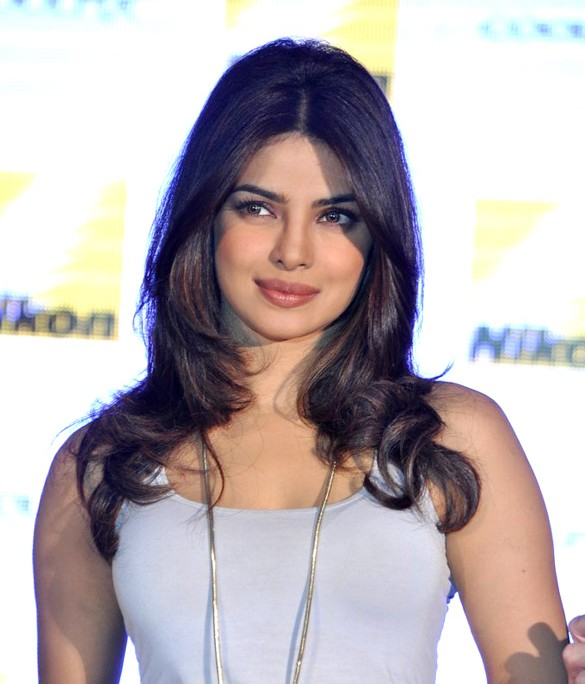
Priyanka Chopra portrayed twelve distinct characters in the film.

The casting of the lead pair was leaked well before the intended official announcements. Gowariker cast Harman Baweja after watching the trailer of his debut film, the science fiction romance Love Story 2050 (2008). He asked Harman's father, Harry Baweja, to show him the film's rushes and was impressed with his performance, calling him the best person for the part. Following this, Priyanka Chopra, who had worked with Baweja in Love Story 2050, was cast to play all twelve of the potential brides, each related to one of the twelve zodiac signs. On casting Chopra, Gowariker said: "I have always liked Priyanka's work, right from Hero: Love Story of a Spy. She's been fabulous in all her films. So when I thought of somebody doing twelve roles I thought about her, as I thought she had the potential." When Gowariker offered the film to her, Chopra instantly agreed to star in it.

Chopra became the first actress in cinematic history to portray twelve distinct characters in one film and was considered for inclusion in the Guinness World Records. On being asked about the decision of casting one actress to portray twelve characters, Gowariker said: "If we had taken twelve different actresses then the most beautiful one would have to be chosen. So beauty would get more importance. But by taking one girl to play all twelve roles, the importance shifts to the characters." Gowariker decided not to use prosthetics or makeup to create different looks for the characters but to make them distinctive using hair and costumes. He wanted to differentiate the characters through their mannerisms and traits.

Baweja, who is a Scorpio like his character Yogesh in the film, said that he could relate to the character. While reading the script, he told Gowariker that some of his character's dialogue was what he would usually say. At the time, Chopra described the film as the "most difficult and important" in her career. She found playing twelve characters equivalent to performing in twelve different films. She had to have a different look for each of them but had very little time to prepare and establish each character on screen, since each character had "one song and about two scenes". Since all the characters except one were between ages eighteen and twenty-four, Chopra found it difficult to make every character look distinct. She said that there were not many options other than changing her hair and the characters' outfits to portray them. As a result, she chose to work on her body language and experimented with her voice and accent to make the characters distinct from one another, describing it as "a real test".

In an interview with Bollywood Hungama, Chopra was quoted saying "when people play multiple characters, they have structures, they are from different parts of the world, sometimes they are a twenty-year-old and then become a forty-year-old in the same film, some with eyes small, etc. I have no clutches [sic]. All the girls I play in the film are in the age group of eighteen and twenty-four." Additionally, she found playing the Capricorn girl, a teenager, very tough, saying: "To play a 15-year-old girl without make-up or special effects to make me look younger was the most challenging role for me. I had to look fifteen years old just through my body language. I didn't want any of the twelve girls to be caricatures." Chopra also read Linda Goodman's Sun Signs and Love Signs to prepare for the parts. Initially, it was planned to film one character at a time, however, that did not happen.

=== Filming ===
Principal photography began in Mumbai on 6 December 2008. The art direction was handled by Nitin Chandrakant Desai, Piyush Shah did the cinematography, and Ballu Saluja edited the film. Before the filming began, several rehearsals were done to choose the right look for the characters. Neeta Lulla was brought in to design Chopra's clothes, while a non-film hair stylist named Asha Harirahan was chosen to design twelve different hair styles and the look of each character. It had a single start-to-finish schedule and was filmed at 65 different locations across Mumbai.

Gowariker remarked that shooting this film was more challenging than Jodhaa Akbar because of filming at so many locations. He found it more time-consuming and challenging but also called it an exciting experience. The second schedule started in January in Mumbai, with scenes also being filmed in Chicago and Baroda, and was scheduled to last until April 2009. The film was also shot at the Mehboob Studio and Film City. The musical numbers were choreographed by Terence Lewis, Rekha Chinni Prakash, Chinni Prakash, Raju Khan, and Rajeev Surti. The song "Aaja Lehraate" was filmed in a single continuous take using a five-camera setup. It was a draining process for Chopra and Baweja, since each mistake required returning to the beginning and filming all over again.

Chopra also had to learn jazz dance for one of the characters. For another song featuring all twelve characters, Chopra had to shoot for 22 hours to keep the continuity of the whole musical sequence. She had to change the costumes and makeup for each of the twelve characters while filming the song. At one point, Chopra fainted on the set and Gowariker wanted to postpone the filming, but she insisted on finishing the scenes. Her heavy workload—filming for several productions, travelling for endorsements, and performing at live shows—took its toll; she was admitted to hospital because of exhaustion and was kept under observation. After spending three days in hospital, she was discharged and immediately resumed filming to avoid delaying her other projects. Filming was completed by the first week of May 2009.

== Soundtrack ==
Initially, Gowariker wanted to hire A. R. Rahman, who had composed the music for his earlier films. However, when Gowariker decided to start filming What's Your Raashee?, Rahman was busy with other projects including Slumdog Millionaire (2008). Gowariker wanted thirteen songs for the film, but Rahman did not have time to compose them, and they agreed not to work together on the film. The director revealed that he did not want another established composer because "he wanted someone to work full time on this film for several months." He later chose Sohail Sen, then a newcomer, to compose the soundtrack and the film's score.

The album contains thirteen original songs written by Javed Akhtar. Twelve songs represent the different zodiac signs, with an additional song being a compilation of the twelve songs. Twelve different themes were created, using a different instrument for each zodiac sign, depicting the traits and personality of each girl. Sen found composing "Chehra Jo Dekhe Hain" most difficult, as he had to merge all the themes of the other twelve songs into one. The vocals were performed by Alka Yagnik, Udit Narayan, Shaan, Madhushree, Bela Shende, Pamela Jain, Bhavya Pandit, and Tarannum Mallik, while Sen performs most of the songs. Gowariker and his sister Ashlesha also provided the vocals for two different songs on the album. The soundtrack was released by Sony Music on 18 August 2009.

The soundtrack received positive reviews from critics. Planet Bollywood gave it a rating of 8.5 out of 10 calling it "a musical extravaganza" and wrote: "Ashutosh Gowariker, Sohail Sen and Javed Akhtar give us one of the classiest, grandest and most eclectic musical extravaganzas to come in a long time." Joginger Tuteja of Bollywood Hungama gave it a rating of 4 out of 5, praising the compositions and wrote "Kudos to the film maker, Sohail Sen and Javed Akhtar for getting their thinking hats together and making something as innovative and fresh as What's Your Raashee?. Listen to this one for a unique experience. This one is not to be missed!" The Hindustan Times rated the album 3 out of 5, commending the composer and calling it a decent album. The BBC praised the album and wrote "Sohail Sen shows he can successfully compete with the best in Bollywood."

== Release ==
The first-look poster of the film was released in January 2009. It resembled a book cover and was designed by Nabeel Abbas. The first teaser, featuring all twelve female characters along with the male protagonist, swaying to the title song, was released in July 2009. To promote the film, the makers teamed up with Facebook to develop an application for users to check their compatibility with their partners as well as to make new friends based on their sun sign. This required users to answer questions about their personal preferences; based on common characteristics with other signs, a list of users with whom they were compatible was shown and they were offered the opportunity to add those people as friends. According to the makers, the application was launched to tie the promotional activity with the theme of the film. Sunita A. Gowariker, the co-producer of the film, later said: "The entire idea ties in well with the theme of the film and yet is not restricted to being only about the film."

The master copy of the film was stolen from the Adlabs Processing at Film City before its release. When Gowariker learnt about the incident, he lodged a police complaint immediately. The case was taken over by the Mumbai Crime Branch. UTV Motion Pictures sent a legal notice to Adlabs Films and UFO Movies, the film's processing and digitising laboratories. It was later revealed that a top official of the lab had sold the master copy for 200,000 rupees to film pirates to make pirated copies of the film to sell in India and overseas. Several people were arrested, including the manager of Adlabs Processing, for allegedly stealing the master copy and producing pirated copies. The print was later recovered by the police, who also found and seized pirated CDs and DVDs produced from the master copy.

What's Your Raashee? was produced by Ronnie Screwvala at UTV Motion Pictures in collaboration with Ashutosh Gowariker Productions, with Gowariker's wife, Sunita, serving as the producer. The film had its world premiere at the 2009 Toronto International Film Festival on 19 September 2009, with more than 2,000 attendees at Roy Thomson Hall. The film was released on 25 September 2009. It had a good opening at the multiplexes but poor attendance elsewhere. Following criticism of the film's excessive length, in mid-week, three songs were cut from the film's theatrical prints to reduce the length of the film. However, the new length was still over three hours, and it was not confirmed if the length was reduced on all of the prints across India. During its run, it grossed ₹160 million at the box office and was considered as a financial failure. Two weeks after the theatrical release, What's Your Raashee? was released for pay-per-view viewing on various DTH platforms such as Tata Sky, Airtel Digital TV, and Dish TV. Distributed by UTV Home Entertainment, the film was released on DVD on 10 December 2009 across all regions, with no bonus content. VCD versions were released at the same time. Blu-ray versions were released in 2011.

UTV Indiagames also released a mobile video game based on the film.

== Critical reception ==
What's Your Raashee? received mixed reviews from critics who criticised the screenplay and its runtime of over three-and-a-half hours. However, Chopra's performance received widespread critical acclaim. Subhash K. Jha gave the film a positive review, calling it "a lovely uncluttered unassuming and transparent film". He also praised Baweja and Chopra's performances and the chemistry between the actors. Jha appreciated Chopra's portrayal of twelve characters, calling it "an amazing achievement", and wrote: "Priyanka gives soul to all the 12 characters she plays. In the climactic song, she brings all of them together, quirks and mannerisms all on display in one unified flow of feelings and body-language. The actress achieves individuality for all her characters while giving the plot a homogeneous flow." The Times of India rated the film 3 out of 5, noting that the film works because Gowariker maintains fluidity in the narrative and gets uniformly good work from his cast, especially Dilip Joshi and Darshan Jariwala, who bring subtlety to comedy.

Several critics had mixed feelings about the film. Sukanya Verma of Rediff.com praised the subtle and refreshing humour, noting that "Gowariker shows a flair for light scenes and creating atmospheric nuances" but criticising the loopy screenplay. She called it "ultimately a performance-oriented film", stating: "A terrific ensemble cast from the world of television and theatre collaborate to its feel-good believability which lasts as long as their screen time." She particularly praised Chopra's performance and wrote: "Priyanka Chopra transforms into 12 new skins with astonishing distinction, voice and spirit. The actress reinvents herself into this unique individual every single time ranging from batty, bashful and boisterous. This is simply her show." Sonia Chopra of Sify also gave a mixed review, noting that the film could have been hugely entertaining but was affected by "a repetitive layout and agonising length". She believed that the film was watchable because of Priyanka Chopra's "consistently stellar act"; she carried the film ably on her shoulders and gave "a fun and uninhibited performance." Namrata Joshi of Outlook gave the film 2 stars out of 4. She thought that Chopra played her characters "competently, confidently but a bit unevenly" and wrote: "The one trump card for the film is the new queen bee Priyanka Chopra. The film is out-and-out a Priyanka show as she hogs screen time and audience attention with her 12 roles."

Shubhra Gupra of The Indian Express was particularly critical of the length of the film and wrote: "Ashutosh Gowariker's latest, which stretches close to four hours running time, starts feeling like bargain-basement from the get go. It's much too long, and, despite Priyanka's valiant efforts, just not engaging enough." Taran Adarsh from Bollywood Hungama gave it a negative review, criticising the writing and the length and saying that "What's Your Raashee? has some wonderful moments and award-worthy performance[s] by Priyanka Chopra, but everything pales into insignificance when the written material is weak." Anupama Chopra of NDTV was highly disappointed with the film, terming it a "gargantuan misstep" for Gowariker: "This epic length simply doesn't work for romance. At nearly four hours, What's Your Raashee? is a marathon watch. And the rewards for enduring it are slim." Sudhish Kamath was also disappointed with the film, criticising the time taken (over 25 minutes) in the first act to reach the first episode: "Priyanka Chopra acquits each of these types with unique quirks associated with these signs and is quite charming in most of her avatars, but there is seriously, no other reason for you to watch this movie."

== Accolades ==
Award	Category	Recipient(s) and nominee(s)	Result	Ref.
Screen Awards	Best Actress	Priyanka Chopra	Nominated	
Screen Awards	Best Actress (Popular Choice)	Priyanka Chopra	Nominated	
Stardust Awards	Superstar of Tomorrow – Male	Harman Baweja	Nominated	
Stardust Awards	Standout Performance by a Music Director	Sohail Sen	Nominated	
Stardust Awards	New Musical Sensation – Female	Bela Shende (for song "Su Chhe")	Nominated	
Stardust Awards	New Musical Sensation – Female	Tarannum Malik (for song "Salone Kya")	Nominated	
