= Shibani Kashyap =

Indian singer

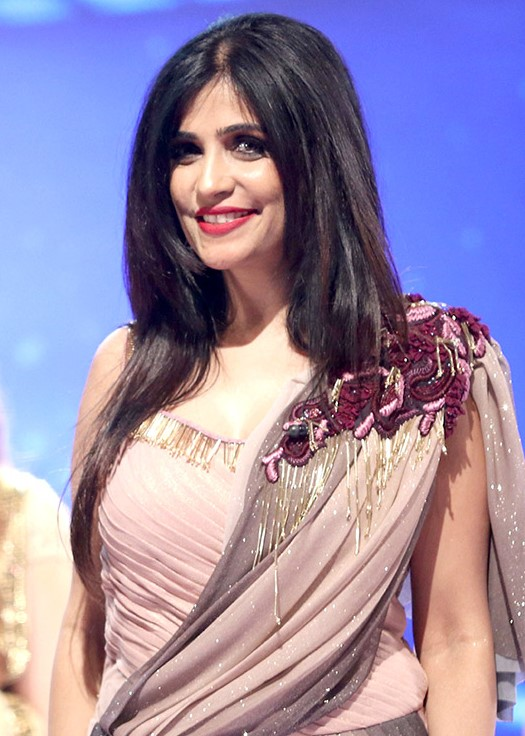
- Kashyap at the Miss & Mrs Tiara 2018 contest
- Born: January 12, 1979 (age 47); Delhi, India
- Education: Delhi Public School, Mathura Road; University of Delhi
- Spouse: Rajiv Roda (2013–present)
- Musical career
- Occupations: Singer and music composer
- Instruments: Vocals; Guitar
- Website: shibanikashyap.com

Shibani Kashyap (born 12 January 1979) is an Indian singer who works in the Hindi cinema. She has judged the reality singing show Bathroom Singer.

Kashyap achieved fame by singing the signature tune of the AIR FM channel of All India Radio and Amul India. Kashyap mostly composes a Sufi-western blend of music.

In 2012 she sang the title song for Pakistani serial Mohabbat Jai Bhar Mein in the Urdu language, which was a major hit in Pakistan and India. She has made her acting debut in the Star Plus TV show Veera as the musician Megha.

== Biography ==
Born in Delhi, India, she is a graduate in English literature from the University of Delhi. She specializes in western and Indian classical music.

She was a member of the band Black Slade in Delhi. In 1996, the signature tune of A.I.R. F.M., a channel of All India Radio was launched in Kashyap's voice. She has composed advertisement jingles for Amul India and Subah Savere show on Doordarshan. She shot into national fame with her debut pop album Ho Gayi Hai Mohabbat (1998), for which she won the Channel V award. She was selected to represent India at the 1999 annual international music festival Azia Dauysy held in Kazakhstan. In 2000, she released her second album called Nagmagee, a sufi album.

Kashyap is a follower of Nichiren Buddhism. She said, "I practise Buddhism. I took up chanting two years ago. My faith teaches me that the 'revolution' begins within oneself. When you change yourself, things around you change too. This philosophy has polished my life and given me a chance to be a better person".

She has performed live shows around the world. She composed and sang her first film song "Sajna Aa Bhi Jaa" for the Hindi film Waisa Bhi Hota Hai Part 2 in 2003. In the same year, she also released her third album Desh, which consists of Assamese and Sanskrit songs, making her first non-Hindi language album. Later, she sang for the films Zinda (2006) and 1971 (2007).

She won the Best Female Pop Singer award for the album Nazakat at the 2005 Sangeet Awards held in San Francisco. She composed and sang the title track for the television serial Akela on Sony Entertainment Television. She was one of the judges of the singing show Bathroom Singer on Sahara Filmy channel.

In 2012 she sang the title song for Pakistani serial Mohabbat Jai Bhar Mein in the Urdu language, which was a major hit in Pakistan.

Kashyap, along with 29 other independent and mainstream artists, was picked to be a part of Hungama Digital Media's new independent music venture ArtistAloud.com. According to Kashyap, "It is a great site as it gives artists their individual space and a platform. It is a great revenue opportunity as well, because there is no way people would be able to pirate these songs, as they are not available in the market. This way we can fight piracy and get our rightful revenues." On 1 August 2012, she traveled from Mumbai to Jantar Mantar, Delhi, to participate in India's fight against corruption. She presented the song "Anna Hazare Deep Hamare" in front of thousands of citizens of India who were there supporting the movement against corruption. On 6 July 2014, she enrolled as a member of Bharatiya Janata Party, an Indian political which formed a government in May 2014. She also announced this association on Twitter. She has also released an album, My Free Spirit, where the remix song was produced by Nakul Shourie and was launched by Sonu Nigam.

The movie Ranviir The Marshal (2015) features a special number sung by Kashyap; where she also made her lead acting debut in the film. In 2018, she sang the gangster-themed song "Bachke tu chalna re", a duet with singer and composer Varun Ahuja for the film Mere Paas Baap Hai.

== Discography ==
=== Films ===
| Year | Title | Song | Language | Singer | Composer | Notes |
|---|---|---|---|---|---|---|
| 2001 | Sesh Upahar | "Mitha Mitha" | Assamese | Yes | No | Debut film as a playback singer |
| 2003 | Waisa Bhi Hota Hai Part II | "Sajna Aa Bhi Jaa" | Hindi | Yes | Yes | Debut Bollywood film |
| 2003 | Waisa Bhi Hota Hai Part II | "Tum Bas Tum" | Hindi | Yes | Yes | Debut Bollywood film |
| 2003 | Waisa Bhi Hota Hai Part II | "Prem Dank" | Hindi | Yes | Yes | Debut Bollywood film |
| 2005 | Mr Ya Miss | "Jeena Hai Toh Jeena Hai" | Hindi | Yes | No | |
| 2005 | Mr Ya Miss | "Fakr Hai Mujhe" | Hindi | Yes | No | |
| 2005 | Mr Ya Miss | "Kamsin Kali Dil Ki Gali" | Hindi | Yes | No | |
| 2006 | Zinda | "Zinda Hoon Main" | Hindi | Yes | Yes | |
| 2006 | Zinda | "Kya Mien Zinda Hoo" | Hindi | Yes | Yes | |
| 2006 | Zinda | "Yeh Hai Meri Kahani" | Hindi | No | Yes | Music Composer only |
| 2007 | 1971 | "Sehlenge Hum Saare Sitam" | Hindi | Yes | No | |
| 2007 | The Great Indian Butterfly | "Keh Le Keh le Dil Se" | Hindi | Yes | No | |
| 2007 | The Great Indian Butterfly | "Thodi Thodi Sanjh" | Hindi | Yes | No | |
| 2008 | Sirf | "Life Peeche Peeche" | Hindi | Yes | Yes | |
| 2008 | Sunday | "Kashmakash" | Hindi | Yes | Yes | |
| 2008 | Maharathi | "Kaun Hai Yaha Maharathi" | Hindi | Yes | Yes | |
| 2008 | Woodstock Villa | "Dhoka Dega" | Hindi | Yes | No | |
| 2008 | Woodstock Villa | "Raakh Ho Ja Tu" | Hindi | Yes | No | |
| 2011 | Bhindi Baazaar Inc. | "Taan Ke Seena" | Hindi | Yes | No | |
| 2012 | Diary of a Butterfly | "Hungama Ho Gaya" | Hindi | Yes | Yes | |
| 2014 | Main Aur Mr. Riight | "Khuda Khair" | Hindi | Yes | Yes | |
| 2014 | Identity Card | "Sannata" | Hindi | Yes | Yes | |

=== Albums ===
| Year | Title | Language(s) | Co-Singer(s) | Notes |
|---|---|---|---|---|
| 1998 | Ho Gayi Hai Mohabbat | Hindi | Aslam | Debut album |
| 2001 | Nagmagee | Hindi | Solo | Second album released Her first solo album |
| 2003 | Desh | Assamese and Sanskrit | Zubeen Garg, Basanta, Bandana, Ranju, Jahnu, Armina | Third album released Her first non-Hindi language album |
| 2005 | Nazakat | Hindi | Solo | Fourth album released Second solo album |
| 2016 | My Free Spirit | Hindi | Solo | Fifth album released Third solo album |

== Filmography ==
=== Film ===
| Year | Title | Role | Notes | Ref |
|---|---|---|---|---|
| 2003 | Waisa Bhi Hota Hai Part II | Herself | Cameo, Song "Sajna Aa Bhi Ja" | |
| 2015 | Ranviir the Marshal | Sheena | Debut | |

=== Television ===
| Year | Title | Role | Notes | Ref. |
|---|---|---|---|---|
| 2014 | Ek Veer Ki Ardaas...Veera | Megha Kapoor | Guest appearance | |
