= Jyotica Tangri =

Indian playback singer

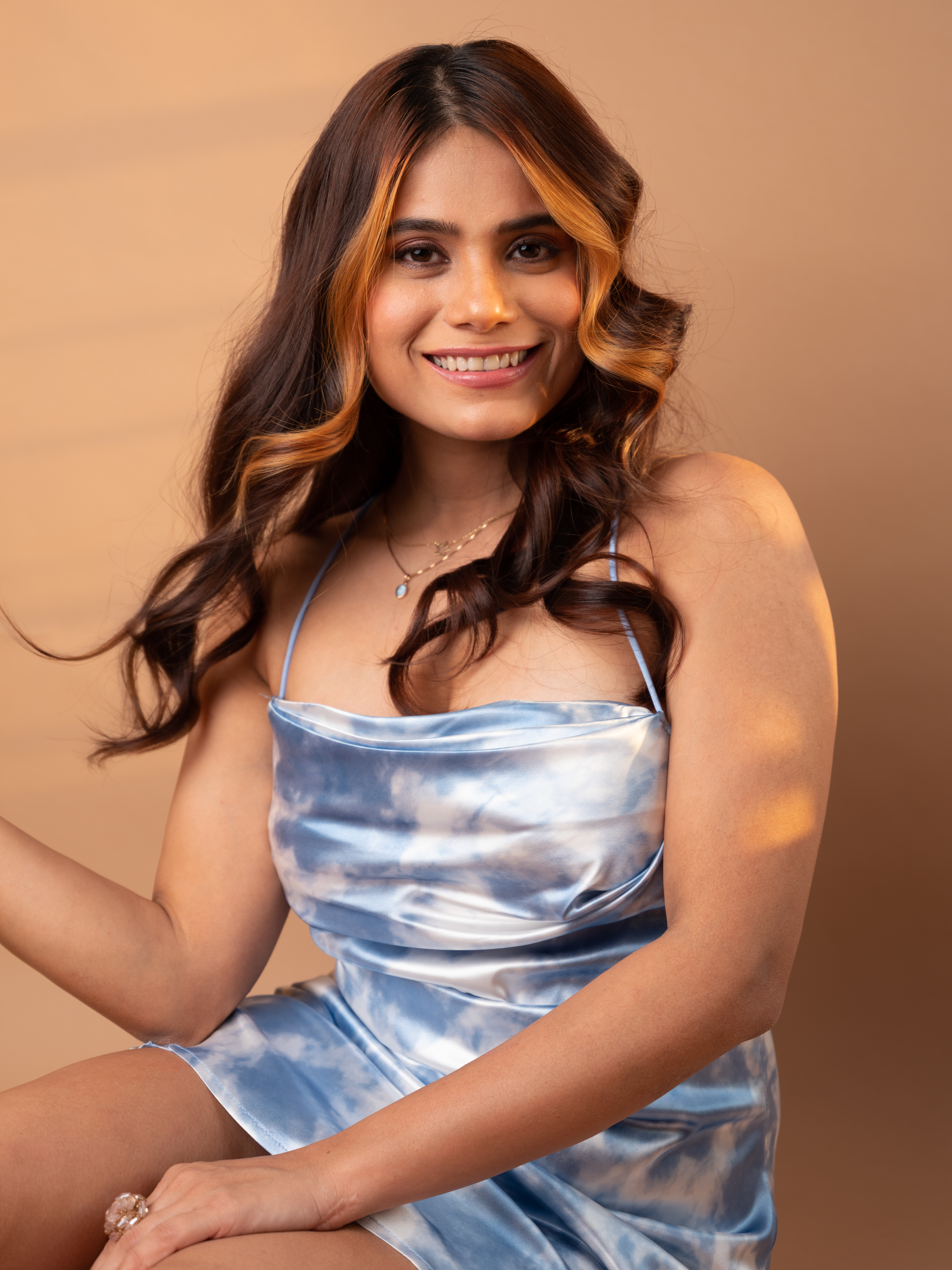
- Tangri in a blue satin dress with golden highlights in her wavy hair, smiling against a beige background in 2023

Background information
- Born: Jyotica Tangri; Jalandhar, Punjab, India
- Origin: India
- Genres: Bollywood; singing; Indian classical
- Occupation: Singer
- Instruments: Vocals, guitar
- Years active: 2017-present
- Labels: T-Series; Zee Music; Rhythm Boyz; Saregama Music; Tips Punjabi

Jyotica Tangri is an Indian playback singer. She is best known for her songs "Pallo Latke" from Shaadi Mein Zaroor Aana (2017), "Mungda" from Total Dhamaal (2019), and "Surmedaani" from Bajre Da Sitta (2022). She debuted with "Jai Maa" in Behen Hogi Teri (2017). She has sung for films like Half Girlfriend (2017), Shaadi Mein Zaroor Aana (2017), and Fukrey Returns (2017). She earned Zee Cine Award for Best Female Playback Singer in 2018. She is also known for her strides in the Punjabi music industry like "Kanda Kacheya", "Jinne Saah", and "Saari Raat".

== Career ==
Tangri was a contestant on the Indian reality television show The Voice. She was unplaced in the contest held in 2015. She was also a finalist of Sa Re Ga Ma Pa 2016 on Zee TV.

She debuted as a playback singer in Ajay K Pannalal's 2017 romantic comedy film, Behen Hogi Teri through the song, Jai Ma, co-sung by Sahil Solanki. The track was composed by Jaidev Kumar and lyricised by Sonu Saggu. Her second song from the same film, entitled Tenu Na Bol Paavan Main along with Yasser Desai was a critically acclaimed number. Composed by Amjad Nadeem and written by Rohit Sharma, the song was one of the few hit tracks of the album. Next, Tangri sang a special version of Phir Bhi Tumko Chaahunga from Mohit Suri's Half Girlfriend. Composed by Mithoon, originally sung by Arijit Singh and Shraddha Kapoor and written by Manoj Muntashir, the song helped Tangri to establish a musical base in the film industry. She also sang the female version of another song from same film entitled Tu Hi Hai, originally sung by Rahul Mishra.

Tangri's first hit song was Kumaar's Pallo Latke from Vinod Bacchan's film Shaadi Mein Zaroor Aana starring Rajkummar Rao and Kriti Kharbanda composed by Zaim-Saim-Raees. Later in the year, Tangri sang the female version of, Ishq De Fanniyar from Fukrey Returns. In 2018, Jyotica sang Shubh Din from Parmanu: The Story of Pokhran. Composed by Sachin–Jigar and written by Vayu, the song was a critically acclaimed number.

In 2020, Tangri sang three songs for the film Virgin Bhanupriya starring Urvashi Rautela, under the music direction of Chirrantan Bhatt, Ramji Gulati and Amjad Nadeem Aamir.

== Filmography ==
Denotes films that have not yet been released

Year	Film/(s)	Song	Co-singer(s)	Composer	Lyrics
2017	Dobaara: See Your Evil	Humdard	Solo	Arko	
2017	Behen Hogi Teri	Jai Maa	Sahil Solanki	Jaidev Kumar	Sonu Saggu
2017	Behen Hogi Teri	Tenu Na Bol Pawan	Yasser Desai	Yash Narvekar	Rohit Sharma
2017	Half Girlfriend	Phir Bhi Tumko Chaahungi	Solo	Mithoon	Manoj Muntashir
2017	Half Girlfriend	Tu Hi Hai	Solo	Rahul Mishra	Laado Suwalka
2017	Channa Mereya	Jinne Saah	Ninja	Goldboy	
2017	Shaadi Mein Zaroor Aana	Pallo Latke	Yasser Desai, Fazilpuria	Zain-Saim-Raees	Kumaar, Rap lyrics: Rossh
2017	Fukrey Returns	Ishq De Faniyar	Solo	Shaarib-Toshi	Kumaar
2018	Parmanu: The Story of Pokhran	Shubh Din	Keerthi Sagathia	Sachin–Jigar	Vayu
2018	Laila Majnu	O Meri Laila	Atif Aslam	Joi Barua	Irshad Kamil
2018	Laila Majnu	Tum (Female Version)	Solo	Niladri Kumar	Irshad Kamil
2018	Hotel Milan	Badi Happening Lagti Ho	Enbee & Raahi	Enbee	
2018	Yamla Pagla Deewana: Phir Se	Tunu Tunu	Alamgir Khan	Sanjeev Darshan	Kunwar Juneja
2018	Baazaar	Kem Cho	Ikka	Tanishk Bagchi	Shabbir Ahmed, Ikka
2018	Brij Mohan Amar Rahe	Balma Yeh Karma	Brijesh Shandilya	Tanishk-Vayu	Vayu
2019	Total Dhamaal	Mungda	Shaan, Shubro Ganguly	Gourov-Roshin	Kunwar Janeja
2019	Rocky	Desi Firangi	Solo	Emraan-Wasim	Jai Atre
2019	Fastey Fasaatey	Dramebaazi Saari	Solo	Rahul Jain, Sanjeev-Ajay	Sanjeev Chaturvedi
2019	Family of Thakur'''ganj'''	Fancy Thumke	Mika Singh, Dev Negi, Rap By Parry G	Sajid–Wajid	Danish Sabri
2019	Jhootha Kahin Ka	Saturday Night	Neeraj Shridhar, Rap by Enbee	Amjad Nadeem & Aamir	Amjad Nadeem, Rap Lyrics by Enbee
2019	Jabariya Jodi	Khadke Glassy	Yo Yo Honey Singh, Ashok Mastie	Tanishk Bagchi, Ashok Mastie, Ramji Gulati	Tanishk Bagchi, Channi Rakhala
2019	Jabariya Jodi	Glassy 2.0	Yo Yo Honey Singh, Ashok Mastie	Tanishk Bagchi, Ashok Mastie, Ramji Gulati	Kumaar
2019	Jabariya Jodi	Macchardaani	Vishal Mishra	Vishal Mishra	Raj Shekhar
2019	Saand Ki Aankh	"Baby Gold"	Sona Mohapatra	Vishal Mishra	Raj Shekhar
2019	Housefull 4	Ek Chumma	Sohail Sen, Altamash Faridi	Sohail Sen	Sameer Anjaan
2019	Dream Girl	Dhagala Lagali Kaala	Mika Singh, Meet Bros	Meet Bros	Kumaar
2020	Jawaani Jaaneman	Gallan Kardi	Jazzy B, Mumzy Stranger	Prem-Hardeep	Preet Harpal, Mumzy Stranger
2020	Virgin Bhanupriya	Kangna Vilayti	Solo	Ramji Gulati	Kumaar
2020	Virgin Bhanupriya	Dil Apne Haadon Se	Solo	Chirrantan Bhatt	Manoj Yadav
2020	Virgin Bhanupriya	Beat Pe Thumka	Solo	Amjad Nadeem Aamir	Alokik Rahi, Amjad Nadeem
2020	Taish	Kol Kol	Solo	Raghav Sachar	Rohit Sharma
2022	Raksha Bandhan	Done Kar Do	Navraj Hans	Himesh Reshammiya	Irshad Kamil
2022	Bajre Da Sitta	Bajre Da Sitta Title Track	Noor Chahal	Jaidev Kumar	Jass Grewal
2022	Bajre Da Sitta	Surmedani	Noor Chahal	Avvy Sra	Harmanjit
2022	Bajre Da Sitta	Veeni De Vich Wang	Noor Chahal	Avvy Sra	Veet Baljit
2022	Bajre Da Sitta	Sone Da Chubara	Noor Chahal	Avvy Sra	Harmanjit
2022	Bajre Da Sitta	Bajre Da Sitta	Saari Raat	Jaidev Kumar	Traditional
2022	Ae Chann Tera Hamdardi	Bajre Da Sitta	Harmanjit, Jaidev Kumar		
2022	Surmedani - Unplugged	Bajre Da Sitta	Harmanjit, Jaidev Kumar		
2022	Saari Raat - Sad	Bajre Da Sitta	Harmanjit, Jaidev Kumar		
2022	Mere Ram Ji	Bajre Da Sitta	Harmanjit, Jaidev Kumar		
2023	Bad Boy	"Tera Hua"	Arijit Singh	Himesh Reshammiya	Sonia Kapoor
2023	Chatrapathi	"Window Taley"	Dev Negi	Tanishk Bagchi	Shabbir Ahmed
2025	Deva	"Bhasad Macha"	Mika Singh	Vishal Mishra	Raj Shekhar
2025	De De Pyaar De 2	"3 Shaukk"	Karan Aujla, Avvy Sra	Avvy Sra, DJ Chetas	Jaani
2026	Bhooth Bangla	"Rani Roop Di"	Yo Yo Honey Singh, Diljit Dosanjh	Yo Yo Honey Singh	Leo Grewal

== Album(s) ==
Year	Album/(s)	Song	Co-singer(s)	Composer	Lyrics	
2017	Zee Music Originals	Sanu Nehar Wale Pul Te Bulake	Solo	Amjad Nadeem	Amjad Nadeem	
2017	Popular Festive Song (92.7 Big FM)	Mera Laung Gawacha	Solo	Sandeep Batraa	Manish Shukla	
2017	Hey Girl	Hey Girl	Aditya Narayan	Arian Romal	Viruss	
2017	Bahon Mein Chale Aao	Bahon Mein Chale Aao Cover Version	Solo	Mika Singh, Ravi Pawar, R.D. Burman	Majrooh Sultanpuri	
2017	T-Series	Sundowner	Avi J	Showkidd	Dhruv Yogi	
2018	Tere Bina	Tere Bina	Sushant Sharma (Rinkoo)	Sushant-Shankar	Jaani	
2018	Zee Music Originals	Maahi Ve Teri Akhiyaan	Raghav Sachar		Rohit Sharma	
2018	Zee Music Originals	Tere Naal Rehna	Jeet Gannguli		Kumaar	
2018	Zee Music Originals	Mahiya Ve Mahiya	Solo	Jaidev Kumar	Sonu Saggu	
2018	Zee Music Originals	Kuch Nahi	Solo	Ajay Jaiswal	Shekhar Astitwa	
2018	Zero to Infinity	Woh Chori	Solo	Raftaar		
2018	Gori Ghani	Gori Ghani	Fazilpuria	Rossh		
2018	Sapno Ke Kaise	Sapno Ke Kaise	Solo	Ajay Jaiswal	Shekhar Astitwa	
2018	Viaah	Viaah	Honey Anttal	Music Empire	Honey Anttal	
2019	Zee Music Originals	Solo	Paani Tera Rang	Amjad Nadeem Aamir	Pawan Kumar & Amjad Nadeem	
2019	Patola Lagdi	Solo	Patola Lagdi	Kaptan Laadi and RDK	Kaptan Laadi and Noddy	
2019	Zee Music Originals	Solo	Unglich Ring Daal De	Chirantan Bhatt	Manoj Yadav	
2019	Dancing Doll	Dancing Doll	Rap by CA Rudra	Sandeep Saxena	Jaggi Singh	
2019	Mere Aas Paas ft. Sonal Chauhan	Mere Aas Paas	Yasser Desai	Arghya & Sanjeev Chaturvedi	Sanjeev Chaturvedi	
2019	Zee Music Originals	Hor Pila	Solo	Ramji Gulati	Kumaar	
2019	Firefighters Bula Lo	Firefighters Bula Lo	Olivia Malhotra ft. Arnie B	Arnie B	ISR(Inder Singh Randhawa)	
2020	Zee Music Originals	Tu Bhi Royega	Solo	Vivek Kar	Kumaar	
2020	Zee Music Company	Fakiri	Solo	Ajay Jaiswal & Arun Dev Yadav	Rashi Maheshwari	
2020	Musiway - GFP	Taake Naina	Ankit Tiwari	Abhishek - Amol	Abhishek Talented	
2021	JT Music	Dream Mein Entry	Amma	Solo	Jyotica Tangri	Sanju
2021	JT Music	Dream Mein Entry	Rakhrhi	Solo		
2021	Saregama Music	Dream Mein Entry	Parry G	Gourov Dasgupta		
JT Music	Kamli	Solo				
JT Music	2023	Hath Phadeya	Solo	Tanvir Sandhu	Vishal Vivek	
Aart Sense Studios	2023	Kharaab	Arjuna Harjai	Arjuna Harjai	Jyotica Tangri	
Aart Sense Studios	2023	Jhoothe	Arjuna Harjai	Arjuna Harjai	Jyotica Tangri	
JT Music	2023	Sundaa Jaa	Solo	Jyotica Tangri	Jyotica Tangri	
JT Music	2023	Suit	Rehmat	Khan Mallanwala	Khan Mallanwala	
JT Music	2023	Mere Naanak Ji	Solo	Jyotica Tangri	Arsh Sidhu	
Varinder Brar	2023	Boo Thang	Varinder Brar	Gill Saab	Varinder Brar	
2024	JT Music	Pyar Naal Mana li	Solo	Enzo	Diljaan	
2024	JT Music	Pyar Mainu Hogya	Solo	Traditional	Ranjha Rajan	
2024	JT Music	Mere Bhole Shankar	Solo	Neelam Bhawana Tangri and Jyotica Tangri	Neelam Bhawana Tangri and Jyotica Tangri	
2024	DRJ Records	Teri Laal Chunariya	Pawan Singh	Javed-Mohsin	Rashmi Virag	

== Appearances on television ==
Year	Show(s)	Role	Channel
2013	Entertainment Ke Liye Kuch Bhi Karega	Contestant	Sony Entertainment Television
2015	The Voice Season 1	Contestant	&TV
2016	Sa Re Ga Ma Pa	Finalist	Zee TV
2019	Superstar Singer	Mentor/Captain	Sony Entertainment Television

2022 - 2023 / Voice of Punjab 13 // Judge // PTC Punjabi

== Awards ==
Year	Award	Song	Film	Result
2018	Zee Cine Award for Best Female Playback Singer	"Pallo Latke"	Shaadi Mein Zaroor Aana	Won
2018	Screen Award for Best Female Playback Singer	"Pallo Latke"	Shaadi Mein Zaroor Aana	Nominated
