= Ek Chumma =

2019 song by Sohail Sen

Single by Sohail Sen, Altamash Faridi and Jyotica Tangri

from the album Housefull 4
- Language: Hindi
- Released: 30 September 2019
- Recorded: 2019
- Studio: YRF (Mumbai); Future Sound of Bombay (Mumbai); Prasad Labs (Hyderabad)
- Genre: Filmi; Indian pop; soft-rock
- Length: 4:04
- Label: T-Series
- Composer: Sohail Sen
- Lyricist: Sameer Anjaan
- Producer: Sohail Sen

Music video
- "Ek Chumma" on YouTube

"Ek Chumma" (transl. One kiss) is an Indian Hindi-language song, composed by Sohail Sen with lyrics written by Sameer Anjaan and sung by Sohail Sen, Altamash Faridi and Jyotica Tangri for the soundtrack album of the 2019 Indian film Housefull 4. The music of the song was composed by Sohail Sen while the lyrics were penned by Sameer Anjaan. The music video of the track features Akshay Kumar, Riteish Deshmukh, Bobby Deol, Kriti Sanon, Pooja Hegde and Kriti Kharbanda. It was released on 30 September 2019 as the first single from the album, under the music label T-Series.

== Development ==
Sohail Sen composed the music of song which was written by Sameer Anjaan. Later Altamash Faridi, Jyotica Tangri and Sen recorded the song. The song was recorded, mixed and mastered by Eric Pillai - Future Sound Of Bombay in Mumbai. The single is filmed in London.

== Music video ==
The music video features Akshay Kumar, Riteish Deshmukh, Bobby Deol, Kriti Sanon, Pooja Hegde and Kriti Kharbanda dancing in England. The song is choreographed by Farah Khan. The song also features spoofs of members of the British royal family, including Charles III, Camilla Parker Bowles, and Elizabeth II, among others. The video song was officially released on 30 September 2019 under T-Series label, and garned lot of views due to its choreography and picturisation.

=== Background and production ===
On 13 July 2018, Farah Khan, choreographer of "Ek Chumma", through her Twitter handle, tweeted that she had choreographed a "super hit" song, composed by Sohail Sen. Farah Khan choreographed the dance sequences. "Ek Chumma" was shot in July 2018 in London. The song was entirely shot in United Kingdom, over 5 locations spread across London and its outskirts, including at the House of Lords and Kensington Palace. The song picturization took 4 days.

== Release ==
The teaser of the song was released on 28 September 2019. The video was released on 30 September 2020. The lyrical was released on 11 October 2019. The song was made available at iTunes the same day of release and for online streaming at JioSaavn and Gaana on 30 September 2019.

== Reception ==
=== Audience response ===
Upon the release of the full video version of the song, it gained lots of appreciation for its music and choreography.

=== Critical reviews ===
Bollywood Hungama on reviewing the music of the soundtrack wrote that "There is a signature Housefull feel to the manner in which 'Ek Chumma' kick-starts the proceedings for Housefull 4. When it comes to the franchise, the music is expected to be peppy, lively and catering to the masses. This is what is the case with this Sameer Anjaan written number as well which has composer Sohail Sen also come behind the mike along with Altamash Faridi and Jyotica Tangri."

The Times of India stated that "Ek Chumma', has the clichéd ‘been there, heard that’ soundscape with a generous use of mandolin, clarinet, violin and percussions. Sung by Sohail Sen, Altamash Faridi and Jyotica Tangri, this track has been penned by Sameer Anjaan and the creators have succeeded in making it sound rather pedestrian."

== Music credits ==
Credits adapted from T-Series.

- Sohail Sen – composer, programmer, arranger, vocals
- Altamash Faridi – vocals
- Jyotica Tangri – vocals
- Sameer Anjaan – lyrics
- Suresh Lalwani – arranger, violin
- Sameer Sen – rhythm, darabuka
- Jagdish Lalwani – programmer
- Chandrakant L – mandolin
- Sanjeev Sen – darabuka
- Raju Sardar – darabuka
- Rajkumar Sodha – clarinet
- Suresh Soni – percussions
- Pratap Rath – percussions
- John Hunt – percussions
- Shantanu Hudlikar – recording engineer
- Abhishek Khandelwal – recording engineer, assistance mixing, assistance mastering
- Manasi Tare – recording engineer
- Eric Pillai – mixing, mastering [at Future Sound of Bombay]
- Michael Edwin Pillai – assistance mixing
- Farah Khan – choreography
- Mathew McVarish Raymond

== Legacy ==
This song inspired the song "Loota Re" from the Pakistani film Quaid-e-Azam Zindabad (2022).

== Controversy ==
The song has received backlash for being "regressive", "entitled" and "sexist". As a response, Sanon in an interview with Mid-Day said "How is it regressive? The boys are saying [those lines] to their partner, not to a stranger. If Ek Chumma was disrespectful towards women, I would have spoken up."
