= Sohail Sen =

- Born: 24 June 1984 (age 42)
- Genres: Pop, classical music, soft rock, retro, world music
- Occupations: Composer, record producer, singer, instrumentalist, music director, programmer
- Instruments: Vocals, guitar, percussion, tabla, piano, dholak, drums, bongos
- Years active: 2008–present

Sohail Sen (born 24 June 1984) is an Indian film composer, musician and singer who works in Bollywood. He debuted as a film composer with the Hindi film Sirf (2008), which went majorly unnoticed. Later, he gained fame as a Hindi film composer, with his acclaimed work in What's Your Raashee? (2009). He is also known for composing the popular soundtracks of Mere Brother Ki Dulhan, Ek Tha Tiger, and Gunday.

== Early life ==
Sen comes from a family of musicians who have worked in the film industry and his entry into the film composing world marked the fourth generation of his family to do so. His father, Sameer Sen (of the music director duo Dilip Sen-Sameer Sen) has always been a strong influence in his life, as was his paternal grandfather Shri Shambhu Sen's singing.

Sen started learning music at the age of six. He learnt to play the tabla as a child, and then went on to learn various musical instruments including the piano and percussion and rhythm instruments. He learnt classical music from his grandfather Shri Shambhu Sen. He began his career as a music director at the young age of thirteen when he composed the music for a telefilm titled Roshni and for which renowned singer Kavita Krishnamurthy provided playback. He then decided to assist his father for nine years to fine-tune his skills as a film composer.

== Career ==
In 2008, Sen began his career as a film composer, with the Hindi film Sirf, however, the film was supposed to be released in 2006, but it got delayed badly and was released in 2008 and eventually the music went unnoticed. He also composed the music for The Murderer (2009), which also got delayed and the music went unnoticed.

In 2009, he got a turning point, in his career as a film composer, when director Ashutosh Gowariker approached him for his film What's Your Raashee?. Initially he wanted his all-time favourite composer A. R. Rahman to compose for the film, but Rahman couldn't do it, because he wanted to compose for Danny Boyle's Slumdog Millionaire instead. So, he started looking for someone who is capable and can contribute all his time for composing in his film alone. Sen was always keen to work with Ashutosh Gowariker and incidentally his father Sameer Sen knew him from before and knowing that Gowariker was looking for someone to compose for his film, Sen asked his father to fix a meeting with him. His first meeting with Gowariker was a casual one at his office, it was where he told him that he would like to make him listen to some of his compositions. Gowariker immediately agreed to visit his studio the next morning. The next day, when he went to Sen's studio and heard some of his tunes, he really liked what he heard and after a couple of weeks later, Gowariker called up Sen and said "You are on for this project". For Sen, it was a dream come true. At first Sen was thrilled of getting the offer, but when he was told that there would be 13 songs in the movie, one song for each of the 12 zodiac signs and then one song in which the lead protagonist makes the final choice, he was taken aback, since nowadays its quite rare to hear 13 different songs in one album and that itself was a difficult task, and again, it was an equally difficult task to create 13 distinct songs, each for one particular zodiac sign and then incorporating the flavor of all these 12 songs into that final song, was the most toughest task, however he took it up as a challenge and started working on the music, which took more than one and a half years in the making.

The soundtrack of the film, was released in August 2009 and irrespective of the box office status of the film, it has been able to garner mostly positive critical responses. Bollywood Hungama quoted the album as "interestingly done" and "an experience not to be missed". BBC Music praised Sen's work and quoted him as "Sen shows he can successfully compete with the best in Bollywood". Besides composing the soundtrack and the film score, Sen even sang most of the songs in the film.

In 2010, director Ashutosh Gowariker roped him again, for his period piece film Khelein Hum Jee Jaan Sey, based on the Chittagong Uprising of 1930. The soundtrack of which met with positive critical responses.

In 2011, he has had a major release with a top banner Yash Raj Films – Mere Brother Ki Dulhan, the music of which got appreciation from both critics and masses. The songs "Dhunki", "Isq Risk" and title track were chartbusters. In 2012, he replaced Pritam as the music director for Salman Khan's next film Ek Tha Tiger, since Pritam had date problems with both Yash Raj projects Ek Tha Tiger and Dhoom 3. The soundtrack received unanimously positive reviews. In 2014, Sen will team up with Ali Abbas Zafar once again after Mere Brother Ki Dulhan for Gunday, which features Ranveer Singh, Arjun Kapoor, Priyanka Chopra, and Irrfan Khan. While Sen will become music composer for the Hindi theatrical release of Gunday, Bappi Lahiri will compose full Bengali songs for the film, as it is also to be released in Bengali. This marks the first time Bappi Lahiri will work with Yash Raj Films.

== Discography ==
Year	Film	Song	Singer(s)	Lyrics	Notes
2008	Sirf	"Pehle Woh Pyaar"	Kunal Ganjawala	Mehboob, Vipul Saini	All songs collaborating with Shibani Kashyap
2008	Sirf	"Zindagi Ki Kahani"	Kunal Ganjawala	Mehboob, Vipul Saini	All songs collaborating with Shibani Kashyap
2008	Sirf	"Zindagi Ki Kahani (II)"	Kunal Ganjawala, Pamela Jain	Mehboob, Vipul Saini	All songs collaborating with Shibani Kashyap
2008	Sirf	"Tujhpe Fida"	Tarannum Mallik, Sohail Sen	Mehboob, Vipul Saini	All songs collaborating with Shibani Kashyap
2008	Sirf	"Mumbai Nagariya"	KK, Tarannum Mallik	Mehboob, Vipul Saini	All songs collaborating with Shibani Kashyap
2008	Sirf	"Ghar Tera Ghar Mera"	Shaan, Shreya Ghoshal	Mehboob, Vipul Saini	All songs collaborating with Shibani Kashyap
2008	Sirf	"Khel Jo Khele"	Vinod Rathod	Mehboob, Vipul Saini	All songs collaborating with Shibani Kashyap
2008	Sirf	"Life Peeche Peeche"	Shibani Kashyap	Mehboob, Vipul Saini	All songs collaborating with Shibani Kashyap
2009	What's Your Raashee?	"What's Your Raashee? - Pal Pal Dil Jisko Dhoonde"	Sohail Sen	Javed Akhtar	Solo Composer
2009	What's Your Raashee?	"What's Your Raashee? - Chehre Jo Dekhe Hain"	Sohail Sen	Javed Akhtar	Solo Composer
2009	What's Your Raashee?	"Jao Na"	Sohail Sen, Tarannum Mallik	Javed Akhtar	Solo Composer
2009	What's Your Raashee?	"Dhadkan Dhadkan"	Sohail Sen, Tarannum Mallik	Javed Akhtar	Solo Composer
2009	What's Your Raashee?	"Salone Kya"	Sohail Sen, Tarannum Mallik	Javed Akhtar	Solo Composer
2009	What's Your Raashee?	"Maanunga Maanunga"	Ashutosh Gowarikar, Pamela Jain	Javed Akhtar	Solo Composer
2009	What's Your Raashee?	"Aa Le Chal"	Aslesha Gowarikar, Harman Baweja	Javed Akhtar	Solo Composer
2009	What's Your Raashee?	"Su Chhe"	Bela Shende, Sohail Sen	Javed Akhtar	Solo Composer
2009	What's Your Raashee?	"Koi Jaane Na"	Rajab Ali Bharti, Bela Shende	Javed Akhtar	Solo Composer
2009	What's Your Raashee?	"Aaja Lehrate"	Shaan, Bhavya Pandit	Javed Akhtar	Solo Composer
2009	What's Your Raashee?	"Bikhri Bikhri"	Sohail Sen, Marianne D'Cruz	Javed Akhtar	Solo Composer
2009	What's Your Raashee?	"Sau Janam"	Udit Narayan, Madhushree, Sohail Sen	Javed Akhtar	Solo Composer
2009	What's Your Raashee?	"Pyaari Pyaari"	Alka Yagnik, Sohail Sen	Javed Akhtar	Solo Composer
2010	Khelein Hum Jee Jaan Sey	"Yeh Des Hai Mera"	Sohail Sen	Javed Akhtar	Solo Composer
2010	Khelein Hum Jee Jaan Sey	"Sapne Saloney"	Sohail Sen, Pamela Jain	Javed Akhtar	Solo Composer
2010	Khelein Hum Jee Jaan Sey	"Naiyn Tere"	Pamela Jain, Ranjini Jose, Kids Chorus	Javed Akhtar	Solo Composer
2010	Khelein Hum Jee Jaan Sey	"Khelein Hum Jee Jaan Sey"	Suresh Wadkar, Chorus	Javed Akhtar	Solo Composer
2010	Khelein Hum Jee Jaan Sey	"Vande Mataram Revised"	Chorus	Javed Akhtar	Solo Composer
2010	Khelein Hum Jee Jaan Sey	"The Escape"	Pamela Jain	Instrumental	Solo Composer
2011	Mere Brother Ki Dulhan	"Mere Brother Ki Dulhan"	KK, Krishna Beura	Irshad Kamil	Solo Composer
2011	Mere Brother Ki Dulhan	"Dhunki"	Neha Bhasin	Irshad Kamil	Solo Composer
2011	Mere Brother Ki Dulhan	"Choomantar"	Benny Dayal, Aditi Singh Sharma	Irshad Kamil	Solo Composer
2011	Mere Brother Ki Dulhan	"Isq Risk"	Rahat Fateh Ali Khan	Irshad Kamil	Solo Composer
2011	Mere Brother Ki Dulhan	"Isq Risk (Risky Mix)"	Sreeram Chandra, Neha Bhasin	Irshad Kamil	Solo Composer
2011	Mere Brother Ki Dulhan	"Madhubala"	Ali Zafar, Sreeram Chandra, Shweta Pandit	Irshad Kamil	Solo Composer
2011	Mere Brother Ki Dulhan	"Do Dhaari Talwaar"	Shahid Mallya, Shweta Pandit	Irshad Kamil	Solo Composer
2012	From Sydney with Love	"Feeling Love in Sydney"	Sohail Sen	Anvita Dutt Guptan	Solo Composer
2012	From Sydney with Love	"Ho Jaayega"	Mohit Chauhan, Monali Thakur	Anvita Dutt Guptan	Solo Composer
2012	From Sydney with Love	"Khatkaa Khatkaa"	Mika Singh	Anvita Dutt Guptan	Solo Composer
2012	From Sydney with Love	"Item Ye Hi Fi"	Neeraj Shridhar	Anvita Dutt Guptan	Solo Composer
2012	From Sydney with Love	"Naino Ne"	Palak Muchhal, Mohammad Salamat	Anvita Dutt Guptan	Solo Composer
2012	From Sydney with Love	"Naino Ne (2nd Version)"	Palak Muchhal, Sohail Sen	Anvita Dutt Guptan	Solo Composer
2012	From Sydney with Love	"Pyaari Pyaari (Remix)"	Sohail Sen, Brooklyn Shanti	Anvita Dutt Guptan	Solo Composer
2012	Ek Tha Tiger	"Laapata"	KK, Palak Muchhal	Anvita Dutt Guptan	Won BIG Star Entertainment Award for Most Entertaining Music, along with Sajid–Wajid
2012	Ek Tha Tiger	"Saiyaara"	Mohit Chauhan, Tarannum Mallik	Kausar Munir	Won BIG Star Entertainment Award for Most Entertaining Music, along with Sajid–Wajid
2012	Ek Tha Tiger	"Banjaara"	Sukhwinder Singh	Neelesh Misra	Won BIG Star Entertainment Award for Most Entertaining Music, along with Sajid–Wajid
2014	Gunday	"Jashn-E-Ishqa"	Javed Ali, Shadaab Faridi	Irshad Kamil	Solo Composer
2014	Gunday	"Rhythm of Jashn-E-Ishqa"	Shaadab Faridi	Irshad Kamil	Solo Composer
2014	Gunday	"Mann Kintu Maula"	Altamash Faridi, Shaadab Faridi	Irshad Kamil	Solo Composer
2014	Gunday	"Mann Kintu Maula (Classical)"	Altamash Faridi, Shaadab Faridi	Irshad Kamil	Solo Composer
2014	Gunday	"Jiya"	Arijit Singh	Irshad Kamil	Solo Composer
2014	Gunday	"Saaiyaan"	Shahid Mallya	Irshad Kamil	Solo Composer
2014	Gunday	"Asalaam-E-Ishqum"	Bappi Lahiri, Neha Bhasin	Irshad Kamil	Solo Composer
2014	Gunday	"Tune Maari Entriyaan"	Bappi Lahiri, KK, Vishal Dadlani, Neeti Mohan	Irshad Kamil	Solo Composer
2014	Gunday	"Tune Maari Entriyaan (Bengali Version)"	Bappi Lahiri, Monali Thakur	Bappi Lahiri, Gautam Susmit	Solo Composer
2014	Gunday	"Gunday"	Sohail Sen, Kinga Rhymes	Ali Abbas Zafar	Solo Composer
2016	Housefull 3	"Taang Uthake"	Sohail Sen, Mika Singh, Neeti Mohan, Mamta Sharma	Sameer Sen, Mamta Sharma, Sanjeev Chaturvedi, Sajid-Farhad	
2016	Happy Bhag Jayegi	"Happy Oye"	Harshdeep Kaur, Shahid Mallya	Mudassar Aziz	Solo Composer
2016	Happy Bhag Jayegi	"Gabru Ready To Mingle Hai"	Mika Singh, Neeti Mohan, Tarannum Mallik, Danish Sabri	Mudassar Aziz	Solo Composer
2016	Happy Bhag Jayegi	"Aashiq Tera"	Altamash Faridi	Mudassar Aziz	Solo Composer
2016	Happy Bhag Jayegi	"Zara Si Dosti"	Arijit Singh	Mudassar Aziz	Solo Composer
2016	Happy Bhag Jayegi	"Yaaram"	Javed Ali	Mudassar Aziz	Solo Composer
2017	The Test Case	Title Track	Bhoomi Trivedi		AltBalaji Web Series
2018	Love per Square Foot (Netflix film)	"Yatri Kripaya Dhyaan De"	Abhishek Dhusia, Sahir Nawab, Sumeet Suvarna		Solo Composer
2018	Love per Square Foot (Netflix film)	"Chicken Dance"	Benny Dayal, Shivangi Bhayana	Anand Tiwari	Solo Composer
2018	Love per Square Foot (Netflix film)	"Aashiyana"	Altamash Faridi, Tarannum Mallik	Abhiruchi Chand	Solo Composer
2018	Love per Square Foot (Netflix film)	"Maqbool Hai"	Altamash Faridi	Jamil Ahmed	Solo Composer
2018	Love per Square Foot (Netflix film)	"Ishq Mein Bajti Hai Ghanti"	Udit Narayan	Gopal Dutt	Solo Composer
2018	Love per Square Foot (Netflix film)	"Raaz Apne Dil Ke (Indian)"	Rekha Bhardwaj	Gopal Dutt	Solo Composer
2018	Love per Square Foot (Netflix film)	"Raaz Apne Dil Ke (Western)"	Rekha Bhardwaj	Gopal Dutt	Solo Composer
2018	Happy Phirr Bhag Jayegi	"Swag Saha Nahi Jaye"	Sohail Sen, Shaadab Faridi, Neha Bhasin, Shivangi Bhayana	Mudassar Aziz	Solo Composer
2018	Happy Phirr Bhag Jayegi	"Happy Bhag Jayegi"	Daler Mehndi, Harshdeep Kaur, Suvarna Tiwari	Mudassar Aziz	Solo Composer
2018	Happy Phirr Bhag Jayegi	"Koi Gal Nai"	Shahid Mallya, Piyush Mishra, Mudassar Aziz	Mudassar Aziz	Solo Composer
2018	Happy Phirr Bhag Jayegi	"Kudiye Ni Tere"	Udit Narayan, Shivangi Bhayana	Mudassar Aziz	Solo Composer
2018	Happy Phirr Bhag Jayegi	"Chin Chin Chu (Remake)"	Jassi Gill, Sonakshi Sinha, Mudassar Aziz	Qamar Jalalabadi	Solo Composer
2018	Baazaar	"Adhura Lafz"	Rahat Fateh Ali Khan, Pratibha Singh Baghel	Jamil Ahmed	
2019	Fraud Saiyaan	"Ishq Ishq Tera"	Altamash Faridi	Kumaar	
2019	Fraud Saiyaan	"Fraud Saiyaan"	Shaadab Faridi	Kumaar	
2019	Fraud Saiyaan	"Mashoor Hazoor - E - Aala"	Shahid Mallya	Kumaar	
2019	Fraud Saiyaan	"Ladies Paan"	Shahid Mallya, Mamta Sharma, Shaadab Faridi	Kumaar	
2019	Yaaram	"Baby Mera"	Sohail Sen, Neha Bhasin	Kumaar	
2019	Romeo Akbar Walter	"Bulleya"	Rabbi Shergill, Shahid Mallya	Ashok Punjabi	
2019	Housefull 4	"Shaitan Ka Saala"	Vishal Dadlani, Sohail Sen	Farhad Samji	
2019	Housefull 4	"Ek Chumma"	Sohail Sen, Altamash Faridi, Jyotica Tangri	Sameer Anjaan	
2019	Housefull 4	"Chammo"	Sukhwinder Singh, Shreya Ghoshal, Shaadab Faridi, Sohail Sen	Sameer Anjaan	
2020	Guns of Banaras	"Band Bajega"	Shahid Mallya	Sameer Anjaan	Solo Composer
2020	Guns of Banaras	"Dheere Dheere Se"	Mohit Chauhan, Pawni Pandey	Sameer Anjaan	Solo Composer
2020	Guns of Banaras	"Bande Hai"	Sohail Sen	Sameer Anjaan	Solo Composer
2020	Guns of Banaras	"Pagal Hai Mera Dil"	Sohail Sen, Palak Muchhal	Sameer Anjaan	Solo Composer
2021	Velle	"Raakh Ka Dariya"	Divya Kumar	Siddharth-Garima	
2021	Velle	"Khayali Ishq"	Mohit Chauhan	Siddharth-Garima	
2022	Double XL	"Taali Taali"	Sohail Sen, Silambarasan, Rukhsar Bandhukia	Mudassar Aziz	
2022	Double XL	"Rangelo Manva"	Sohail Sen, Shahid Mallya, Rekha Bhardwaj, Pratibha Singh Baghel	Mudassar Aziz	
2022	Double XL	"Tumse Mila Doon"	Javed Ali, Sohail Sen	Mudassar Aziz	
2024	Maharaj	"Achutam Keshavam"	Sonu Nigam, Osman Mir	Traditional	Netflix film
2024	Maharaj	"Holi Ke Rang Ma"	Shreya Ghoshal, Shaan, Osman Mir,Sohail Sen	Kausar Munir	Netflix film
2024	Maharaj	"Haan Ke Haan"	Monali Thakur	Kausar Munir	Netflix film
2025	Mere Husband Ki Biwi	"Sawariya Ji"	Sohail Sen, Varsha Singh Dhanoa	Mudassar Aziz	

== Awards and nominations ==
Year	Category	Nominated work	Result	Ref(s)
Filmfare Awards
2012	Best Music Director	Mere Brother Ki Dulhan	Nominated	
Stardust Awards
2010	Standout Performance by a Music Director	What's Your Raashee?	Nominated	
2011	Standout Performance by a Music Director	Khelein Hum Jee Jaan Sey	Nominated	
2011	New Musical Sensation – Male	Khelein Hum Jee Jaan Sey	Nominated	
Mirchi Music Awards
2014	Album of The Year	Gunday	Nominated	
2014	Best Song Producer (Programming & Arranging)	"Tune Maari Entriyaan" from Gunday	Nominated	
