= ZCO =

ZCO could refer to:

- Croxley tube station, London; National Rail station code ZCO
- La Araucanía International Airport near Temuco, Chile; IATA airport code ZCO
- The Zonal Computing Olympiad, one of the component competitions of the Indian Computing Olympiad
