= List of Indian states and union territories by literacy rate =

Indian subdivisions by literacy

This article documents the literacy rate of states and union territories of the Republic of India. The Indian national census is a key source for literacy data. However, a national census has not been conducted since 2011 in India, thus other data sources have been used since then as a reference.

== Recent estimates ==
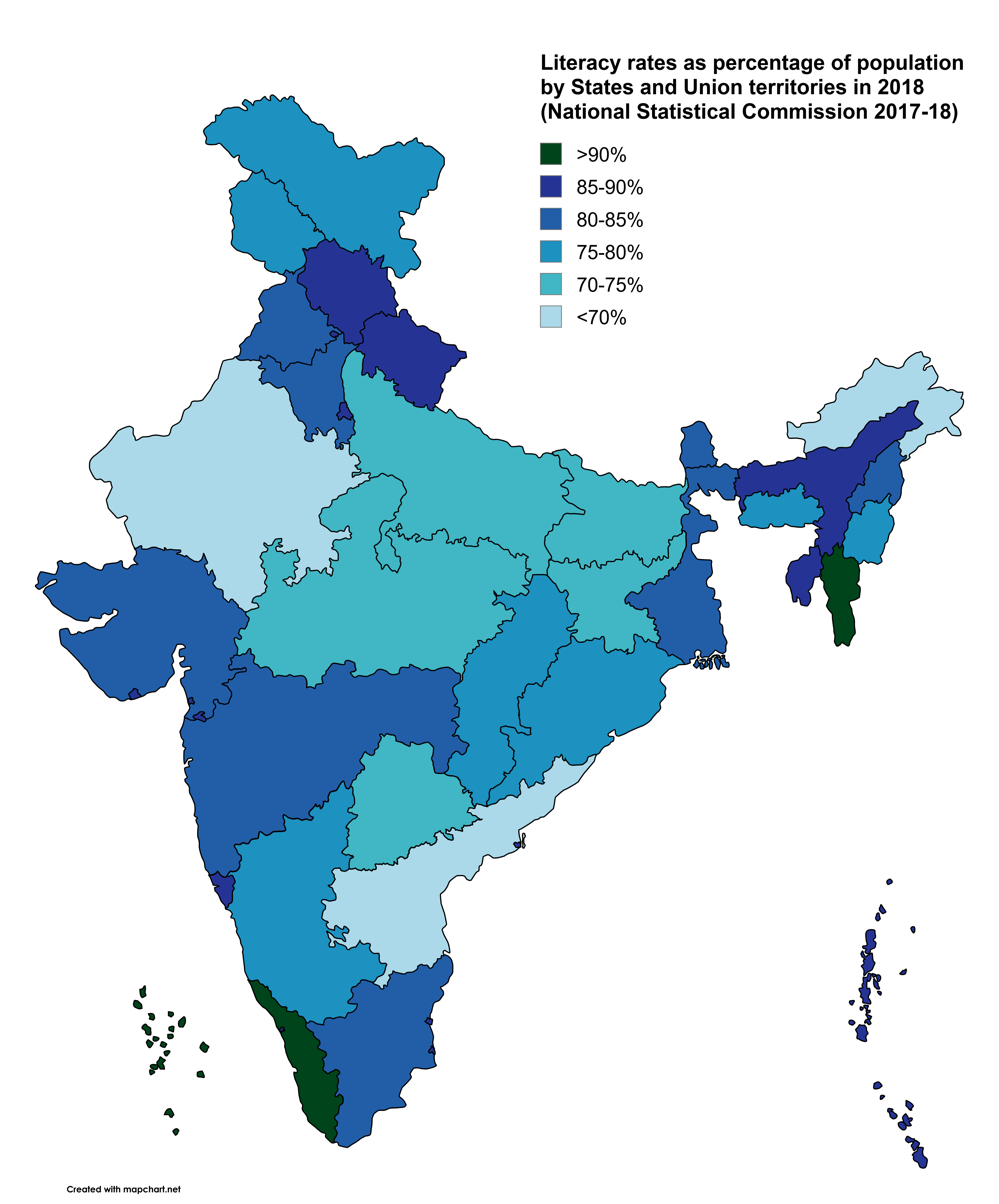
Literacy rate as per NSC in 2017-18

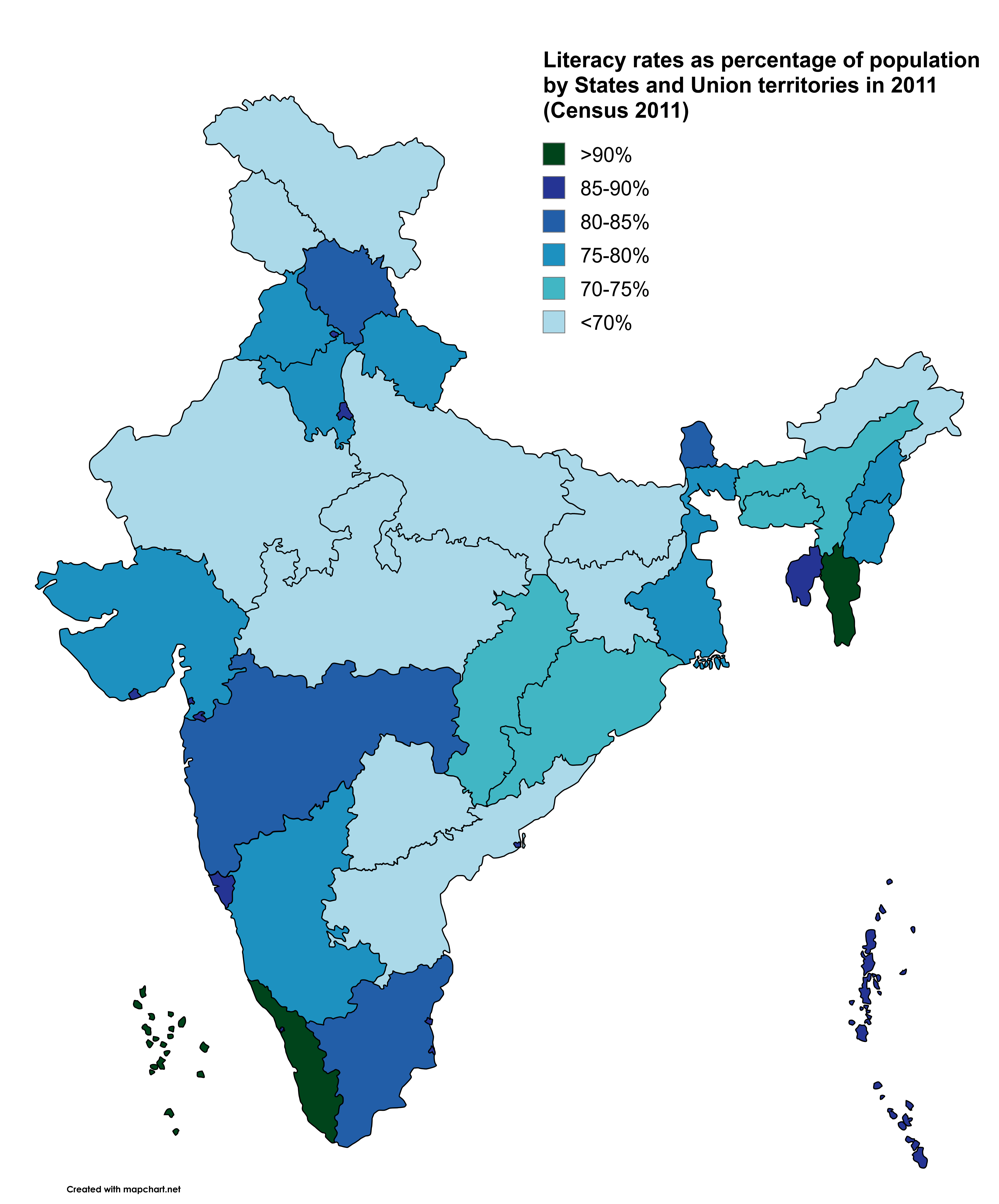
Literacy rate as per Census 2011

Literacy rates as %age of population aged seven and older
State/UT	Census 2011			NSC survey (2017)			PLFS report (2024)		
State/UT	Total	Male	Female	Total	Male	Female	Total	Male	Female
India	74.04	82.14	65.46	77.7	84.7	70.3	80.9	87.2	74.6
Andaman and Nicobar Islands^{[UT]}	86.63	90.27	82.43	86.27	90.11	81.84	91.1	95.0	87.0
Andhra Pradesh	67.02	74.88	59.15	66.4	73.4	59.5	72.6	78.8	66.8
Arunachal Pradesh	65.38	72.55	57.70	66.95	73.4	59.50	84.2	88.0	80.3
Assam	72.19	77.85	66.27	85.9	90.1	81.2	87.0	90.3	83.6
Bihar	61.80	71.20	51.50	70.9	79.7	60.5	74.3	82.3	66.1
Chhattisgarh	70.28	80.27	60.24	77.3	85.4	68.7	78.5	86.2	70.6
Chandigarh^{[UT]}	86.05	89.99	81.19	86.43	90.54	81.38	93.7	96.4	90.7
Dadra and Nagar Haveli^{[UT]}	76.34	85.17	64.32	77.65	86.46	77.65	-	-	-
Daman and Diu^{[UT]}	87.10	91.54	79.55	87.07	91.48	87.07	-	-	-
Dadra and Nagar Haveli and Daman and Diu^{[UT]} (Note: Dadra and Nagar Haveli and Daman and Diu was formed in 2019 as a union territory after the consolidation of the former union territories Dadra and Nagar Haveli, and Daman and Diu, as a single administrative unit.)	-	-	-	-	-	-	87.8	93.6	80.7
Delhi^{[UT]}	86.21	90.94	80.76	88.70	93.70	82.40	86.9	91.6	81.5
Goa	88.70	92.65	84.66	87.4	92.81	81.84	93.6	97.0	90.0
Gujarat	78.03	85.75	69.68	82.4	89.5	74.8	84.6	91.2	77.5
Haryana	75.55	84.06	65.94	80.4	88.0	71.3	84.8	91.4	77.4
Himachal Pradesh	82.80	89.53	75.93	86.6	92.9	80.5	88.8	94.6	83.1
Jammu and Kashmir^{[UT]} (Note: The data from before 2019 is from when Jammu and Kashmir was a state. It became a union territory in 2019 and Ladakh was separated from it to form its own union territory.)	67.16	76.75	56.43	77.3	85.7	68.0	82.0	89.6	73.8
Jharkhand	66.41	76.84	55.42	74.3	83.0	64.7	76.7	82.8	70.6
Karnataka	75.36	82.47	68.08	77.2	83.4	70.5	82.7	88.1	77.3
Keralam	94.00	96.11	91.07	96.2	97.4	95.2	95.3	96.7	94.0
Lakshadweep^{[UT]}	91.85	95.56	87.95	92.28	96.11	88.25	97.3	99.4	94.8
Ladakh^{[UT]} (Note: Ladakh became a union territory in 2019. Prior to that it was part of Jammu and Kashmir state.)	-	-	-	-	-	-	81.0	87.9	73.1
Madhya Pradesh	69.32	78.73	59.24	73.7	81.2	65.5	75.2	83.1	67.0
Maharashtra	82.34	88.38	75.87	84.8	90.7	78.4	87.3	92.7	81.6
Manipur	76.94	83.58	70.26	79.85	86.49	73.17	92.0	94.4	89.7
Meghalaya	74.43	75.95	72.89	75.48	77.17	73.78	94.2	95.1	93.5
Mizoram	91.33	93.35	89.27	99.01	93.72	89.40	98.2	99.2	97.0
Nagaland	79.55	82.75	76.11	80.11	83.29	80.11	95.7	97.2	94.1
Odisha	72.87	81.59	64.01	77.3	84.0	70.3	79.0	84.9	73.3
Puducherry^{[UT]}	85.85	91.26	80.67	86.55	92.12	86.55	92.7	96.9	88.8
Punjab	75.84	80.44	70.73	83.7	88.5	78.5	83.4	87.0	79.8
Rajasthan	66.11	79.19	52.12	69.7	80.8	57.6	75.8	85.9	65.8
Sikkim	81.42	86.55	75.61	82.2	87.29	76.43	84.7	89.3	79.3
Tamil Nadu	80.09	86.77	73.44	82.9	87.9	77.9	85.5	90.0	81.3
Telangana (Note: Telangana was split from Andhra Pradesh in 2014)	-	-	-	72.8	80.5	65.1	76.9	84.7	69.4
Tripura	87.22	92.53	82.73	87.75	92.18	83.15	93.7	95.7	91.6
Uttarakhand	78.82	87.40	70.01	87.6	94.3	80.7	83.8	90.4	77.2
Uttar Pradesh	67.68	77.28	57.18	73.0	81.8	63.4	78.2	86.0	70.4
West Bengal	76.36	81.69	70.54	80.5	84.8	76.1	82.6	85.8	79.3

Administered as a Union territory directly by Union government.

== Census ==
Literacy rate as % of population (Note: Literacy rates for 1951, 1961 and 1971 Censuses relate to population aged five years and above. The rates for the 1981, 1991, 2001 and 2011 Censuses relate to the population aged seven years and above. The literacy rate for 1951 in case of West Bengal relates to Total Population including 0-4 age group. Literacy rate for 1951 in respect of Chhattisgarh, Madhya Pradesh and Manipur are based on sample population.) (Note: India and Manipur figures exclude those of the three sub-divisions viz., Mao Maram, Paomata and Purul of Senapati district of Manipur as census results of 2001 in these three sub-divisions were cancelled due to technical and administrative reasons.)
State/UT	1951	1961	1971	1981	1991	2001	2011
Andaman and Nicobar Islands	30.30	40.07	51.15	63.19	73.02	81.30	86.63
Andhra Pradesh	-	21.19	24.57	35.66	44.08	60.47	67.02
Arunachal Pradesh	-	7.13	11.29	25.55	41.59	54.34	65.38
Assam	18.53	32.95	33.94	-	52.89	63.25	72.19
Bihar	13.49	21.95	23.17	32.32	37.49	47.00	61.80
Chandigarh	-	-	70.43	74.80	77.81	81.94	86.05
Chhattisgarh	9.41	18.14	24.08	32.63	42.91	64.66	70.28
Dadra and Nagar Haveli	-	-	18.13	32.90	40.71	57.63	76.24
Daman and Diu	-	-	-	-	71.20	78.18	87.10
Delhi	-	61.95	65.08	71.94	75.29	81.67	86.21
Goa	23.48	35.41	51.96	65.71	75.51	82.01	88.70
Gujarat	21.82	31.47	36.95	44.92	61.29	69.14	78.03
Haryana	-	-	25.71	37.13	55.85	67.91	75.55
Himachal Pradesh	-	-	-	-	63.86	76.48	82.80
Jammu and Kashmir	-	12.95	21.71	30.64	-	55.52	67.16
Jharkhand	12.93	21.14	23.87	35.03	41.39	53.56	66.41
Karnataka	-	29.80	36.83	46.21	56.04	66.06	75.36
Keralam	47.18	55.08	69.75	78.85	89.81	90.86	94.00
Lakshadweep	15.23	27.15	51.76	68.42	81.78	86.66	91.85
Madhya Pradesh	13.16	21.41	27.27	38.63	44.67	63.74	69.32
Maharashtra	27.91	35.08	45.77	57.24	64.87	76.84	82.34
Manipur	12.57	36.04	38.47	49.66	59.89	70.50	76.94
Meghalaya	-	26.92	29.49	42.05	49.10	62.56	74.43
Mizoram	31.14	44.01	53.80	59.88	82.26	88.80	91.33
Nagaland	10.52	21.95	33.78	50.28	61.65	66.59	79.55
Odisha	15.80	21.66	26.18	33.62	49.09	63.08	72.87
Puducherry	-	43.65	53.38	65.14	74.74	81.24	85.85
Punjab	-	-	34.12	43.37	58.51	69.65	75.84
Rajasthan	8.5	18.12	22.57	30.11	38.55	60.41	66.11
Sikkim	-	-	17.74	34.05	56.94	68.81	81.42
Tamil Nadu	-	36.39	45.40	54.39	62.66	73.45	80.33
Tripura	-	20.24	30.98	50.10	60.44	73.19	87.22
Uttar Pradesh	12.02	20.87	23.99	32.65	40.71	56.27	67.68
Uttarakhand	18.93	18.05	33.26	46.06	57.75	71.62	78.82
West Bengal	24.61	34.46	38.86	48.65	57.70	68.64	76.26
India	18.33	28.30	34.45	43.57	52.21	64.84	74.04

== Literacy by social group ==
=== By caste ===
Literacy rate % (NSO 2018)
Social Group	Rural		Urban		Total	
Social Group	Male	Female	Male	Female	Male	Female
Scheduled Tribe	75.6	58.8	91.3	79.6	77.5	61.3
Scheduled Caste	78.0	60.9	88.4	75.3	80.3	63.9
Other Backward Class	81.7	64.2	91.1	80.5	84.4	68.9
Others	87.6	74.5	95.0	88.6	90.8	80.6
India	81.5	65.0	92.2	82.8	84.7	70.3

=== By religion ===
Religion	NSO 2018						PLFS 2024								
Religion	Rural		Urban		Total		Rural			Urban			Total		
Religion	Male	Female	Male	Female	Male	Female	Total	Male	Female	Total	Male	Female	Total	Male	Female
Hindu	81.8	64.5	93.4	83.8	85.1	70.0	77.3	84.7	69.8	89.7	93.7	85.4	80.8	87.3	74.2
Muslim	77.4	64.8	85.8	75.6	80.6	68.8	77.1	83.5	70.9	83.7	87.6	79.6	79.5	85.0	74.0
Christian	84.4	77.0	95.5	91.4	88.2	82.2	85.8	88.0	83.6	94.5	95.9	93.2	88.9	90.8	87.1
Sikh	92.7	96.4	94.2	95.3	88.9	90.1	80.9	84.3	77.3	90.9	94.7	87.1	83.4	86.9	79.8
India	81.5	65.0	92.2	82.8	84.7	70.3	77.5	84.7	70.4	88.9	92.9	84.9	80.9	87.2	74.6

== See also ==
- Literacy in India
- Education in India
- Gender inequality in India

== Sources ==
- Census (2011), Chapter 6: State of Literacy (PDF), Government of India
- NSO (2018). Household Social Consumption on Education in India (PDF) (Report).
