= Literacy in India =

Literacy rate map of India, by state 2011

Literacy in India is a key for socio-economic progress. The 2011 census, indicated a 2001–2011 literacy growth of 9.2%, which was slower than the growth seen during the previous decade. At the then-current rate of progress in 1990, one study projected that universal literacy might be reached by 2060. The Census of India reported an average literacy rate of 73% in 2011, while the National Statistical Commission estimated it at 80.6% in 2017–18. Meanwhile, the National Sample Survey Office in its 2023–2024 annual PLFS report stated the total literacy rate of India to be 80.9%. Literacy rate in urban areas was 90%, higher than rural areas with 77%. There is a wide gender disparity in the literacy rate in India and effective literacy rates (age 7 and above) was 88% for men and 81% for women. Lower female literacy rates are associated with challenges in family planning and population stabilization in India. Studies have indicated that female literacy is a strong predictor of the use of contraception among married Indian couples, even when women do not otherwise have economic independence. The census provided a positive indication that growth in female literacy rates (11.8%) was substantially faster than in male literacy rates (6.9%) in the 2001–2011 decadal period, which means the gender gap appears to be narrowing.

On 29 September, 2026, the Press Information Bureau, Government of India, released a Factsheet titled "Literacy for All" to detail the progress made towards achieving universal literacy. This document contains current data on the levels of literacy in the country. It's broad observations are,

"According to the Periodic Labour Force Survey (PLFS) 2025, the literacy rate in urban areas reached 89% for those aged 7 years and above, and 88% for those aged 5 years and above. Among urban residents aged 7 years and above, literacy reached 93.1% for males and 84.8% for females. In rural areas, the literacy rate among those aged 7 years and above was 77.4%, and 76.4% for those aged 5 years and above. Among the rural population aged 7 years and above, the literacy rate was 84.8% for males and 70.3% for females. The overall Literacy rate of the country is 81.1 % as per this survey."

Literacy involves a continuum of learning enabling individuals to achieve their goals, to develop their knowledge and potential, and to participate fully in their community and wider society."

The National Literacy Mission defines literacy as the ability to read, write, and perform basic arithmetic, and to then apply these skills to everyday life. Practicing literacy goes beyond the basic skills, causing people to improve their living situation, make more informed decisions, and participate in society. This can be achieved through acquiring skills to improve economic status and the general wellbeing, developing awareness for the causes of deprivation, and establishing values that expand on these ideas.

== Census dataset ==
Literacy rate for 1951, 1961 and 1971 relate to population aged five years and above. The rate for the years 1981 and 1991 relate to the population aged seven years and above. The working definition of literacy in the Indian census since 1991 is as follows:

Literacy rate

Also called the "effective literacy rate"; the total percentage of the population of an area at a particular time aged seven years or above who can read and write with understanding. Here the denominator is the population aged seven years or more.

$\text{Effective literacy rate}=\frac{\text{number of literate persons aged 7 or above}}{\text{population aged 7 and above}}\times 100%$

Crude literacy rate is the total percentage of the people of an area at a particular time who can read and write with understanding, taking the total population of the area (including below seven years of age) as the denominator.

$\text{Crude literacy rate}=\frac{\text{number of literate persons}}{\text{total population}}\times 100%$

Literacy rates by decade
Year	Male %	Female %	Combined %
1872			~3.25
1881	8.1	0.35	4.32
1891	8.44	0.42	4.62
1901	9.8	0.6	5.4
1911	10.6	1.0	5.9
1921	12.2	1.8	7.2
1931	15.6	2.9	9.5
1941	24.9	7.3	16.1
1951	27.16	8.86	18.33
1961	40.4	15.35	28.3
1971	45.96	21.97	34.45
1981	56.38	29.76	43.57
1991	64.13	39.29	52.21
2001	75.26	53.67	64.83
2011	82.14	65.46	74.04

== Other Datasets ==
Top Performing States in 2018
No	State	Literacy Rate in Percentage
1	Kerala	93.91%
2	Delhi	88.7%
3	Uttarakhand	87.6%
4	Himachal Pradesh	86.6%
5	Assam	85.9%
6	Maharashtra	84.8%
7	Punjab	83.7%
8	Tamil Nadu	82.9%
9	Gujarat	82.4%
10	West Bengal	80.2%

Source: The report on 'Household Social Consumption: Education in India as part of 75th round of National Sample Survey – from July 2017 to June 2018. Other than Assam, no other state from the Northeast was included in the survey.

== Regional literacy comparison ==
The table below shows the adult and youth literacy rates for India and some neighboring countries as complied by UNESCO in 2015. Adult literacy rate is based on the 15+ years age group, while the youth literacy rate is for the 15–24 years age group (i.e. youth is a subset of adults).

Comparative literacy statistics by neighboring country (2015)
Country	Adult literacy rate	Youth literacy rate ages 15–24
China	96.4%	99.7%
Sri Lanka	92.6%	98.8%
Myanmar	93.7%	96.3%
World average	86.3%	91.2%
India	74.5%	92%
Nepal	64.7%	86.9%
Bangladesh	61.5%	83.2%
Pakistan	58%	80.3%

== Literacy rate disparity ==
One of the main factors contributing to this relatively low literacy rate is perceived usefulness of education and lack of nearby schools in rural areas. There was a shortage of classrooms to accommodate all the students in 2006–2007. In addition, there is no proper sanitation in most schools. The study of 188 government-run primary schools in central and northern India revealed that 59% of the schools had no drinking water facility and 89% no toilets. In 600,000 villages and rapidly expanding urban slums, 'free and compulsory education' is the basic literacy instruction dispensed by minimally trained 'para teachers'. The average pupil teacher ratio for all India is 42:1, implying a teacher shortage. These factors contribute to regional disparities in literacy outcomes. Furthermore, the expenditure allocated to education was never above 4.3% of the GDP from 1951 to 2002 despite the target of 6% by the Kothari Commission. This further complicates the literacy problem in India.

Disparities of literacy for among social groups.

Severe caste disparities also exist in literacy outcomes across India, directly affecting marginalized groups such as Scheduled Castes and Scheduled Tribes. These specific communities face systemic barriers such as economic disadvantages, limited access to quality education, and social discrimination. In rural areas where these populations are concentrated, the schools have limited access to technology and materials or may be poorly equipped, discouraging regular attendance. Discrimination against lower castes has resulted in high dropout rates and low enrollment rates. The National Sample Survey Organisation and the National Family Health Survey collected data in India on the percentage of children completing primary school which are reported to be only 36.8% and 37.7% respectively. On February 21, 2005, the Prime Minister of India said that he was pained to note that "only 47 out of 100 children enrolled in class I reach class VIII, putting the dropout rate at 52.78 percent." It is estimated that at least 35 million, and possibly as many as 60 million, children aged 6–14 years are not in school.

The large proportion of illiterate females is another reason for the low literacy rate in India. Inequality based on gender differences resulted in female literacy rates being lower at 65.46% than that of their male counterparts at 82.14%. Due to strong stereotyping of female and male roles, sons are thought of to be more useful and hence are educated. Females are pulled to help out on agricultural farms at home as they are increasingly replacing the males on such activities which require no formal education. Fewer than 2% of girls who engaged in agriculture work attended school.

== History and progress ==
=== Pre-colonial period ===
Prior to the colonial era, education in India typically occurred under the supervision of a guru in traditional schools called gurukulas. The gurukulas were supported by public donations and were one of the earliest forms of public school offices.

According to the historian Dharampal, based on his analysis of British documents from the early 1800s, pre-colonial education in India was widespread and fairly accessible: While attendance was much lower for girls than boys, children of all castes (including Shudra and "other castes") and social strata attended the formal, out-of-home education. Dharampal notes that senior British officials, such as Thomas Munro – who reported that the Hindu temple or mosque of each village had a school attached to it and the children of all communities attended these schools – surveyed the number and types of indigenous Indian educational institutions still operating in the early nineteenth century, numbers and status of students attending, and the instruction given. In 1821, one such official, G. L. Prendergast of the Bombay Presidency Governor's Council, stated:

... there is hardly a village ... in which there is not at least one school ... many in every town, and in large cities; ... where young natives are taught reading, writing and arithmetic, upon a system so economical ... that there is hardly a cultivator or petty dealer who is not competent to keep his own accounts with a degree of accuracy, in my opinion, beyond what we meet with amongst the lower orders in our own country.

William Adam, missionary and later journalist, reported in 1830, that there were around one hundred thousand schools in Bengal and Bihar.

=== British period ===
In the colonial era, the community-funded gurukul system and temple-based charity education, began to decline as the centrally funded institutions promoted by the British colonial administration began to gradually take over.

From 1881 and 1947, the number of English-language primary schools grew from 82,916 to 134,866 and the number of students attending those institutions grew from 2,061,541 to 10,525,943. Literacy rates among the Indian public, as recorded rose from an estimated 3.2 per cent in 1872, to 16.1 per cent in 1941.

In 1944, the British colonial administration presented a plan, called the Sargent Scheme for the educational reconstruction of India, with a goal of producing 100% literacy in the country within 40 years, i.e. by 1984. Although the 40-year time-frame was derided at the time by leaders of the Indian independence movement as being too long a period to achieve universal literacy, India had only just crossed the 74% level by the 2011 census. The British Indian censuses identify a significant difference in literacy rates, by: sex, religion, caste and state of residence, an example of which may be seen in the table below.

1901 census – literacy rate
Location	Male %	Female %
Madras	11.9	1.1
Bombay	11.6	0.9
Bengal	10.4	0.5
Berar	8.5	0.3
Assam	6.7	0.4
Punjab	6.4	0.3
United Provinces	5.7	0.2
Central Provinces	5.4	0.2

=== Post-independence ===
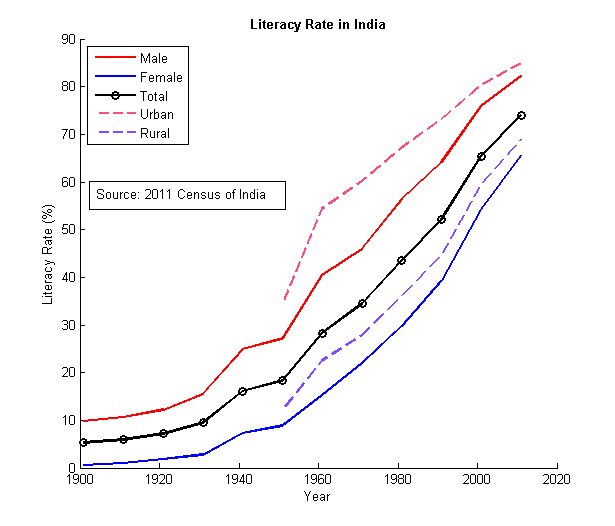
Literacy in India grew very slowly until Indian independence in 1947. An acceleration in the rate of literacy growth occurred in the 1991–2001 period.

The provision of universal and compulsory education for all children in the age group of 6–14 was a cherished national ideal and had been given overriding priority by incorporation as a Directive Policy in Article 45 of the Constitution, but it is still to be achieved more than half a century since the Constitution was adopted in 1949. Parliament has passed the Constitution 86th Amendment Act, 2002, to make elementary education a Fundamental Right for children in the age group of 6–14 years. In order to provide more funds for education, an education cess of 2 percent has been imposed on all direct and indirect central taxes through the Finance (No. 2) Act, 2004.

In 2000–01, there were 60,840 pre-primary and pre-basic schools, and 664,041 primary and junior basic schools. Total enrolment at the primary level has increased from 19,200,000 in 1950–51 to 109,800,000 in 2001–02. The number of high schools in 2000–01 was higher than the number of primary schools at the time of independence.

The literacy rate grew from 18.33 percent in 1951, to 74.04 percent in 2011. During the same period, the population grew from 361 million to 1,210 million.

Literacy rates (age 7+) by decade
Year	Male %	Female %	Combined %
1951	27.16	8.86	18.33
1961	40.4	15.35	28.3
1971	45.96	21.97	34.45
1981	56.38	29.76	43.57
1991	64.13	39.29	52.21
2001	75.26	53.67	64.83
2011	82.14	65.46	74.04

== Growth and variation ==
Every census since 1880 had indicated rising literacy in the country, but the population growth rate had been high enough that the absolute number of illiterate people rose with every decade. The 2001–2011 decade is the second census period (after the 1991–2001 census period) when the absolute number of Indian illiterate population declined (by 31,196,847 people), indicating that the literacy growth rate is now outstripping the population growth rate.

As per data available in 2011-13, India's literacy rate was at 75%. Kerala had achieved a literacy rate of 93% in 2013. As per data made available in 2025, Mizoram is the most literate state with 98.2% literacy and the least literate state in India is Andhra Pradesh with a literacy rate of 72.6%. The Periodic Labour Force Survey Report, 2023-24 released by the Ministry of Statistics and Programme Implementation, Government of India, offers a detailed snapshot of the literacy rates of different age groups in each Indian state and Union Territory. The total literacy rate in India for persons aged seven and above has been estimated at 80.9%. For persons aged seven and above across rural and urban areas, the lowest literacy rate is of Andhra Pradesh at 72.6%. Bihar, the state which has had the lowest literacy rate for several decades, has now overtaken Andhra Pradesh and has a literacy rate of 74.3% as per the report. Amongst other states, Madhya Pradesh has a literacy rate of 75.2% and Jharkhand is at 76.7%. Kerala has a literacy rate of 95.3% amongst persons aged seven and above as per the same report.

Six Indian states account for about 60% of all illiterates in India: Uttar Pradesh, Bihar, Madhya Pradesh, Rajasthan, and Andhra Pradesh (including Telangana). Slightly less than half of all Indian illiterates (48.12%) are in the six states of Uttar Pradesh, Bihar, Rajasthan, Madhya Pradesh, Jharkhand and Chhattisgarh.

State-wise Literacy rate, India 1951-2011
State/ UTs	1951	1961	1971	1981	1991	2001	2011
Andaman and Nicobar Islands	30.3	40.07	51.15	63.19	73.02	81.3	86.6
Andhra Pradesh	NA	21.19	24.57	35.66	44.08	60.47	67
Arunachal Pradesh	NA	7.13	11.29	25.55	41.59	54.34	65.4
Assam	18.53	32.95	33.94	NA	52.89	63.25	72.2
Bihar	13.49	21.95	23.17	32.32	37.49	47	61.8
Chandigarh	NA	NA	70.43	74.8	77.81	81.94	86
Chhattisgarh	9.41	18.14	24.08	32.63	42.91	64.66	70.3
Dadra and Nagar Haveli	NA	NA	18.13	32.9	40.71	57.63	76.2
Daman and Diu	NA	NA	NA	NA	71.2	78.18	87.1
Delhi	NA	61.95	65.08	71.94	75.29	81.67	86.2
Goa	23.48	35.41	51.96	65.71	75.51	82.01	88.7
Gujarat	21.82	31.47	36.95	44.92	61.29	69.14	78
Haryana	NA	NA	25.71	37.13	55.85	67.91	75.6
Himachal Pradesh	NA	NA	NA	NA	63.86	76.48	82.8
Jammu and Kashmir	NA	12.95	21.71	30.64	NA	55.52	67.2
Jharkhand	12.93	21.14	23.87	35.03	41.39	53.56	66.4
Karnataka	NA	29.8	36.83	46.21	56.04	66.64	75.4
Kerala	47.18	55.08	69.75	78.85	89.81	90.86	94
Lakshadweep	15.23	27.15	51.76	68.42	81.78	86.66	91.8
Madhya Pradesh	13.16	21.41	27.27	38.63	44.67	63.74	69.3
Maharashtra	27.91	35.08	45.77	57.24	64.87	76.88	82.3
Manipur	12.57	36.04	38.47	49.66	59.89	70.53	76.9
Meghalaya	NA	26.92	29.49	42.05	49.1	62.56	74.4
Mizoram	31.14	44.01	53.8	59.88	82.26	88.8	91.3
Nagaland	10.52	21.95	33.78	50.28	61.65	66.59	79.6
Odisha	15.8	21.66	26.18	33.62	49.09	63.08	72.9
Puducherry	NA	43.65	53.38	65.14	74.74	81.24	85.8
Punjab	NA	NA	34.12	43.37	58.51	69.65	75.8
Rajasthan	8.5	18.12	22.57	30.11	38.55	60.41	66.1
Sikkim	NA	NA	17.74	34.05	56.94	68.81	81.4
Tamil Nadu	NA	36.39	45.4	54.39	62.66	73.45	80.1
Tripura	NA	20.24	30.98	50.1	60.44	73.19	87.2
Uttar Pradesh	12.02	20.87	23.99	32.65	40.71	56.27	67.7
Uttarakhand	18.93	18.05	33.26	46.06	57.75	71.62	78.8
West Bengal	24.61	34.46	38.86	48.65	57.7	68.64	76.3

== State literacy programmes ==
Several states in India have executed successful programs to boost literacy rates. Over time, a set of factors have emerged as being key to success: the official will to succeed, deliberate steps to engage the community in administering the program, adequate funding for infrastructure and teachers, and provisioning additional services which are considered valuable by the community (such as free school lunches).

=== Bihar ===
Bihar has significantly raised the literacy rate as per the 2011 census. Literacy rate in year 1951 was only 13.49%, 21.95% in year 1961, 23.17% in year 1971 and 32.32% in year 1981. The literacy rate has risen from 39% in 1991 to 47% in 2001 to 63.82% in 2011. In 2017 Bihar's literacy rate stood at 70.2% according to National Statistical Commission report 2017-18 According to the Bihar Caste Survey report presented in the state assembly, Bihar's literacy rate has seen a significant increase of 18% over the past 12 years, now standing at 79.7%. This data indicates that Bihar is no longer the least literate state in India. This improvement reflects ongoing efforts to enhance educational access and quality across the state. The Government of Bihar has launched several programs to boost literacy, and its Department of Adult Education won a UNESCO award in 1981.

Extensive impoverishment, entrenched hierarchical social divisions and the lack of correlation between educational attainment and job opportunities are often cited in studies of the hurdles literacy programs face in Bihar. Often, children receiving an education in Bihar face significant challenges due to the regions socio-cultural influences and economic factors. Children from "lower castes" are frequently denied school attendance and harassed when they do attend. In areas where there is discrimination, poor funding and impoverished families means that children often cannot afford textbooks and stationery.

When children do get educated, general lack of economic progress in the state means that government jobs are the only alternative to farming labor, yet these jobs, in practice, require bribes to secure – which poorer families cannot afford. This leads to educated youths working on the farms, much as uneducated ones do, and leads parents to question the investment of sending children to school in the first place. Bihar's government schools have also faced teacher absenteeism, leading the state government to threaten to withhold of salaries of teachers who failed to conduct classes on a regular basis. To incentivize students to attend, the government announced a Rupee 1 per school-day grant to poor children who show up at school.

=== Tripura ===
Tripura has the third highest literacy rate in India. According to the 2011 census, literacy level was 93.91 percent in Kerala and 91.58 percent in Mizoram, among the most literate states in the country. The national literacy rate, according to the 2011 census, was 74.04 percent.

The Tripura success story is attributed to the involvement of local government bodies, including gram panchayats, NGOs and local clubs under the close supervision of the State Literacy Mission Authority (SLMA) headed by the chief minister. Tripura attained 87.75 percent literacy in the 2011 census, from the 12th position in the 2001 census to the 4th position in the 2011 census. The Tripura Chief Minister said that efforts were underway to literate leftover 5.35 percent people and achieve complete success in a state of about 3.8 million people. The programs were not just implemented to make the state literate but as long-term education programs to ensure all citizens have a certain basic minimum level of education. Tripura has 45 blocks and 23 subdivisions that are served by 68 government-run schools and 30–40 private schools.

Among projects implemented by the state government to increase literacy in the state are:

- Total literacy drive for people aged between 15 and 50 who have lost the chance of entering formal education fold. A special programme – titled improved pace and content learning (IPCL) – has been designed to provide basic education to such people.
- 10,000 Anganwadi centers have 100 percent enrollment.
- Policy of no-fail till class VIII to prevent children from dropping out.
- Midday meals in all schools with an eclectic menu for all days of the week to attract more students.
- No tuition fee in government colleges.

The holistic education system, implemented with equal interest in Agartala, remote areas and the tribal autonomic areas makes sure that people in Tripura do not just become literate but educated, officials emphasized. One pointer to the government's interest in education is the near-total absence of child labor in Tripura.

=== Kerala ===
Kerala topped the Education Development Index (EDI) among 21 major states in India in the year 2006–2007. More than 94% of the rural population has access to a primary school within 1 km, while 98% of the population benefits one school within a distance of 2 km. An upper primary school within a distance of 3 km is available for more than 96% of the people, whose 98% benefit the facility for secondary education within 8 km. The access for rural students to higher educational institutions in cities is facilitated by widely subsidized transport fares. This high level of physical access has played a crucial role in ensuring high enrollment.

Kerala's educational system has been developed by institutions owned or aided by the government. In the educational system prevailed in the state, schooling is for 10 years which is subdivided into lower primary, upper primary and high school. After 10 years of secondary schooling, students typically enroll in Higher Secondary Schooling in one of the three major streams— liberal arts, commerce or science. Upon completing the required coursework, students can enroll in general or professional undergraduate programs.

Kerala launched a "campaign for total literacy" in Ernakulam district in the late 1980s, with a "fusion between the district administration headed by its collector on one side and, on the other side, voluntary groups, social activists and others". On February 4, 1990, the Government of Kerala endeavoured to replicate the initiative on a statewide level, launching the Kerala State Literacy Campaign. First, households were surveyed with door-to-door, multistage survey visits to form an accurate picture of the literacy landscape and areas that needed special focus. Then, Kala Jāthas (cultural troupes) and Sāksharata Pada Yātras (Literacy Foot Marches) were organized to generate awareness of the campaign and create a receptive social atmosphere for the program. An integrated management system was created involving state officials, prominent social figures, local officials and senior voluntary workers to oversee the execution of the campaign.

=== Himachal Pradesh ===
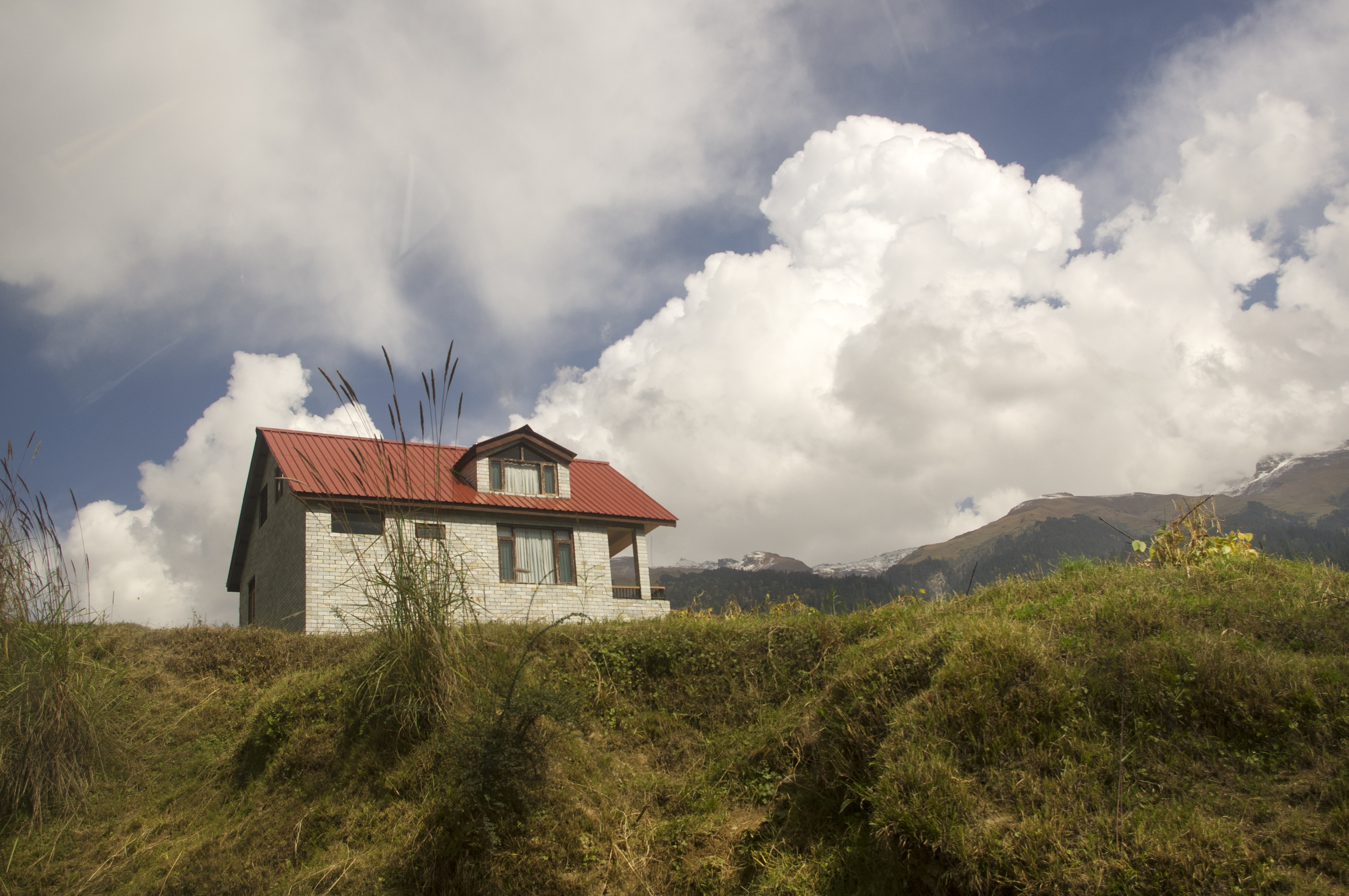
Strong government action and community support made Himachal Pradesh one of India's most literate states by 2001.

Himachal Pradesh underwent a "Schooling Revolution" in the 1961–2001 period that has been called "even more impressive than Kerala's." Kerala has led the nation in literacy rates since the 19th century and seen sustained initiatives for over 150 years, whereas Himachal Pradesh's literacy rate in 1961 was below the national average in every age group. In the three decadal 1961–1991 period, the female literacy in the 15–19 years age group went from 11% to 86%. School attendance for both boys and girls in the 6–14-year age group stood at over 97% each, when measured in the 1998–99 school year.

=== Mizoram ===
Mizoram is the second most literate state in India (91.58 percent), with Serchhip and Aizawl districts being the two most literate districts in India (literacy rate is 98.76% and 98.50%), both in Mizoram. Mizoram's literacy rate rose rapidly after independence: from 31.14% in 1951 to 88.80% in 2001. As in Himachal Pradesh, Mizoram has a social structure that is relatively free of hierarchy and strong official intent to produce total literacy. The government identified illiterates and organized an administrative structure that engaged officials and community leaders and was staffed by "animators" who were responsible for teaching five illiterates each. Mizoram established 360 continuing education centers to handle continued education beyond the initial literacy teaching and to provide an educational safety net for school drop-outs.

=== Tamil Nadu ===
One of the earliest versions of the scheme began in 1923, providing cooked meals to children in corporation schools in the city of Madras.The programme was introduced on a large scale in the 1960s under the chief ministership of K. Kamaraj. The first major thrust came in 1982 when Chief Minister of Tamil Nadu, Dr. M. G. Ramachandran, decided to universalize the scheme for all children up to class 10. Tamil Nadu's midday meal programme is among the best-known in the country. Starting in 1982, Tamil Nadu took an approach to promote literacy based on free lunches for schoolchildren, "ignoring cynics who said it was an electoral gimmick and economists who said it made little fiscal sense." The then chief minister of Tamil Nadu, MGR launched the program, which resembled a similar initiative in 19th century Japan, because "he had experienced as a child what it was like to go hungry to school with the family having no money to buy food".

Eventually, the programme covered all children under the age of 15, as well as pregnant women for the first four months of their pregnancy. Tamil Nadu's literacy rate rose from 54.4% in 1981 to 80.3% in 2011. In 2001, the Supreme Court of India instructed all state governments to implement free school lunches in all government-funded schools, but implementation has been patchy due to corruption and social issues. Despite these hurdles, 120 million receive free lunches in Indian schools every day, making it the largest school meal programme in the world.

=== Rajasthan ===
Although the decadal rise from 2001 to 2011 was only 6.7% (60.4% in 2001 to 67.7% in 2011), Rajasthan had the biggest percentage decadal (1991–2001) increase in the literacy of all Indian states, from about 38% to about 61%, a leapfrog that has been termed "spectacular" by some observers. Aggressive state government action, in the form of the District Primary Education Programme, the Shiksha Karmi initiative and the Lok Jumbish programme are credited with the rapid improvement. Virtually every village in Rajasthan now has primary school coverage. When statehood was granted to Rajasthan in 1956, it was the least literate state in India with a literacy rate of 18%.

== Literacy promotion ==
The right to education is a fundamental right, and UNESCO aimed at education for all by 2015. India, along with the Arab states and sub-Saharan Africa, has a literacy level below the threshold level of 75%, but efforts are ongoing to achieve that level. The campaign to achieve at least the threshold literacy level represents the largest ever civil and military mobilization in the country. International Literacy Day is celebrated each year on 8 September with the aim to highlight the importance of literacy to individuals, communities and societies.

=== Government efforts ===
Financial regulators in India such as RBI, SEBI, IRDAI, PFRDA, etc. have created a joint charter called National Strategy For Financial Education (NSFE), detailing initiatives taken by them for financial literacy in India. Also, other market participants like banks, stock exchanges, broking houses, mutual funds, and insurance companies are actively involved in it. The National Centre For Financial Education (NCFE) in consultation with relevant financial sector regulators and stakeholders has prepared the revised NSFE(2020–2025)

==== National Literacy Mission ====
The National Literacy Mission, launched in 1988, aimed at attaining a literacy rate of 75 percent by 2007. Its charter is to impart functional literacy to non-literates in the age group of 35–75 years. The Total Literacy Campaign is their principal strategy for the eradication of illiteracy. The Continuing Education Scheme provides a learning continuum to the efforts of the Total Literacy and Post Literacy programs.

==== Sarva Shiksha Abhiyan ====
The Sarva Shiksha Abhiyan (Hindi for Total Literacy Campaign) was launched in 2001 to ensure that all children in the 6–14-year age-group attend school and complete eight years of schooling by 2010. An important component of the scheme is the Education Guarantee Scheme and Alternative and Innovative Education, meant primarily for children in areas with no formal school within a one-kilometer (0.62 mi) radius. The centrally sponsored District Primary Education Programme, launched in 1994, had opened more than 160,000 new schools by 2005, including almost 84,000 alternative schools.

=== Non-governmental efforts ===
The bulk of Indian illiterates live in the country's rural areas, where social and economic barriers play an important role in keeping the lowest strata of society illiterate. Government programs alone, however well-intentioned, may not be able to dismantle barriers built over centuries. Major social reformation efforts are sometimes required to bring about a change in the rural scenario. Specific mention is to be made regarding the role of the People's Science Movements (PSMs) and Bharat Gyan Vigyan Samiti (BGVS) in the Literacy Mission in India during the early 1990s. Several non-governmental organisations such as Pratham, ITC, Rotary Club, Lions Club have worked to improve the literacy rate in India.

==== Mamidipudi Venkatarangaiya Foundation ====
Shantha Sinha won a Magsaysay Award in 2003 in recognition of "Her guiding the people of Andhra Pradesh to end the scourge of child labor and send all of their children to school." As head of an extension programme at the University of Hyderabad in 1987, she organized a three-month-long camp to prepare children rescued from bonded labor to attend school. Later, in 1991, she guided her family's Mamidipudi Venkatarangaiya Foundation to take up this idea as part of its overriding mission in Andhra Pradesh. Her original transition camps grew into full-fledged residential "bridge schools." The foundation's aim is to create a social climate hostile to child labor, child marriage and other practices that deny children the right to a normal childhood. Today the MV Foundation's bridge schools and programs extend to 4,300 villages.

== See also ==
- List of Indian states and union territories by literacy rate
- Literacy
- Education in India
- Kerala model
- National Literacy Mission Programme
- Speech on Education in India by Keshub Chandra Sen delivered at London on 24 May 1870.
- Ekal Vidyalaya, non-profit charity organisation dedicated to education and village development in rural India
- Asha for Education, a non-profit organisation bringing hope through education.
- Pratham, an NGO with literacy programmes
- PlanetRead, a non-profit organisation using subtitled Bollywood film songs to increase functional literacy

== Sources ==
- NSO (2018). Household Social Consumption on Education in India (PDF) (Report).
- Dharampal (2000). "Introduction". The Beautiful Tree: Indigenous Indian Education in the Eighteenth Century (3rd ed.). Goa, India: Other India Press. pp. 7–86. pp. 17–18: "It is important to emphasize that indigenous education was carried out through pathshalas, madrassahs and gurukulas. Education in these traditional institutions — which were actually kept alive by revenue contributions by the community including illiterate peasants ... These institutions were, in fact, the watering holes of the culture of traditional communities."

Ms. Sneha Bhati, Prof. J.P. Dubey. “Media Literacy among Students in India.” Journal of Positive School Psychology, 2022, journalppw.com/index.php/jpsp/article/view/13640.
