= The Chatterjee Group Centres for Research and Education in Science and Technology =

Research University in Kolkata, India

- Motto: Inventing Harmonious Future
- Type: Deemed to be University; Research university
- Established: c. 2020; 6 years ago
- Founder: The Chatterjee Group
- Academic affiliations: AIU; UGC
- Chancellor: Purnendu Chatterjee
- Vice-Chancellor: Malabika Sarkar
- Location: Bidhannagar, West Bengal, India; 22°34′30.75″N 88°25′9.1″E
- Campus: Salt Lake Sector-V
- Acronym: TCG CREST
- Website: tcgcrestdtbu.ac.in

The Chatterjee Group Centres for Research and Education in Science and Technology or simply TCG CREST, is a multiple cross-disciplinary educational research centre deemed-to-be-university located in Salt Lake’s Sector V, West Bengal, India. It has five schools. It was established in 2020 and is one of the first research-driven private university in India.

== History ==
TCG Centres for Research and Education in Science and Technology was incorporated as a private, non-government company on 3 February 2010 and is registered with the Registrar of Companies, Kolkata, under CIN U74120WB2010NPL141674. According to publicly available corporate records, the company is classified as a company limited by guarantee and remains active. Its listed directors include Purnendu Chatterjee, Kishore Bhattacharya, and Swapan Bhattacharya.

A notable instance of this collaboration occurred on September 14, 2023, when senior AcSIR leadership visited the TCG CREST campus in Kolkata. During this visit, Documents were exchanged, Discussions were held to enhance their ongoing collaboration, symbolizing the strengthening of their partnership. The PhD degrees earned by students at TCG CREST were awarded by AcSIR. To breaks traditional boundaries, launching research hubs in the UK, US, and Japan. Moving beyond its Kolkata roots, the institution prioritizes PhD innovation in AI and quantum science. By bridging the gap between academia and industry, it creates a global ecosystem where talent drives the future of frontier technology.

== Academic Divisions ==
TCG CREST has primarily operated across six research verticals: the Institute for Advancing Intelligence (IAI), Centre for Quantum Engineering, Research and Education (CQuERE), Centre for High Impact Neuroscience and Translational Applications (CHINTA), Cancer-related Advanced Research and Education (CARE), Food Technology and Science Institute (FTSI), and Research Institute for Sustainable Energy (RISE).

Currently, the institute consists of five schools: the School of Natural Sciences, the School of Mathematical and Computer Science, the School of Health, Environment & Sustainability Studies, the School of Humanities & Social Sciences, and the School of Economics. Indian cryptographer Professor Bimal Kumar Roy (former Director of the Indian Statistical Institute, Kolkata) played a key role in the establishment of TCG CREST (DTBU). The Institute for Advancing Intelligence (IAI) was founded under his academic leadership.

== Faculty and researchers ==
TCG CREST has been associated with researchers from a range of scientific disciplines, including materials science, artificial intelligence, computer science, mathematics, cryptography, and biomedical research. Researchers affiliated with the institute have included statistician and data scientist Shibasish Dasgupta, solid-state battery researcher Abhik Banerjee, neuroscientist Sumantra Chattarji, materials scientist Satish Ogale, quantum computing researcher Shibdas Roy, natural language processing expert Prasenjit Majumder and cryptolgists Bimal Kumar Roy.

== Achievements ==
Professor Satishchandra B. Ogale, Director of the Research Institute for Sustainable Energy (RISE) at TCG-CREST, Kolkata has been selected to receive the prestigious 2026 TWAS Award in Physics, Astronomy, and Space Sciences. This award was conferred by The World Academy of Sciences (TWAS).

Scientists at the institution have pioneered a transformative sodium-ion battery capable of achieving a 94% charge in just five minutes. Eliminating reliance on lithium, cobalt, and nickel, this indigenous innovation utilizes earth-abundant materials to deliver an energy density of 180 Wh/kg. Designed for thermal stability and longevity, the battery sustains thousands of cycles with minimal degradation, signifying a strategic leap toward energy self-reliance and offering a sustainable, high-power alternative for electric mobility and grid storage.

Researchers at campus have achieved a landmark breakthrough by resolving a sixteen-year bottleneck in quantum computing. Their pioneering Ψ-HHL algorithm optimizes the classic HHL framework, which was previously hindered by high "condition numbers" that rendered complex linear equations impractical to solve. By implementing an efficient error-subtraction technique, the team has enabled exponential speedups without exhaustive resource consumption. This advancement bridges the gap between theoretical potential and industrial application, significantly accelerating frontiers in drug discovery, materials science, and climate modeling.

Researchers in Kolkata campus have achieved a pioneering breakthrough by developing human brain organoids to investigate Spinocerebellar Ataxia Type-12. By reprogramming patient cells into 3D "mini-brains," the team at TCG CREST can now observe neurological degeneration in real-time. This precision-medicine approach offers a transformative platform for drug discovery, specifically targeting genetic disorders prevalent within local Indian communities.

== Notable Researchers ==
- Bhramar Mukherjee, Biostatistics and Data Science.
- Bimal Kumar Roy, Cryptography and Information Security.
- Malabika Sarkar, Academia and History.
- Partha Pratim Chakrabarti, Artificial Intelligence.
- Rajeeva Laxman Karandikar, Mathematics, Statistics and Psephology.
- Saibal Chattopadhyay, Management.
- Satish Ogale, Nanomaterials and clean energy.
- Shibdas Roy, Quantum Computing.
- Sumantra Chattarji, Neuroscience.
