= Higher Secondary Certificate =

Board Examination of class 12 in the Indian Subcontinent

Higher Secondary Certificate (HSC), Higher Secondary School Certificate, Higher Secondary Education Certificate (HSEC) or Intermediate Examination is a secondary education qualification in Bangladesh, India and Pakistan. It is equivalent to the final year of high school in the United States and A level in the United Kingdom.

== History ==
The Society for Promoting Christian Knowledge (SPCK) was the first organisation who worked with the British government to spread practical needs education along with religious education. In 1824, the General Committee of Public Instruction was established and it proposed to include moral education in the India subcontinent. The establishment of a Directorate of Public Instruction (DPI) was made at each province in 1854 by the proposal of the Woods Education Dispatch.

The Hunter Commission, was the first education commission in India. They suggested the introduction of "A" Course (Literature) and "B" Course (Technical Education) and guided to establish higher education through private entrepreneurship and the government colleges to remain under divisional management. The Sadler Commission in 1917 had proposed introducing two years of university education merged among the colleges as Higher Secondary Education. In 1944; the Sargent Scheme proposed secondary education for children aged between 11 and 17 years.

The Akram Khan Committee and the Ataur Rahman Khan Commission were established consecutively in 1947 and 1957 to revise the education system. As a result, East Pakistan Secondary Education Board was established to conduct the examination of the secondary level institutions. This Board was split and 6 boards were established at each division in pursuance of the Ordinance- 1961

After the independence of Bangladesh the government directly controlled secondary and higher secondary education and nationalized a good number of schools and colleges. The office of the Director of Public Instruction (DPI) was renamed the Directorate of Secondary and Higher Education (DSHE) in 1981

== By countries ==
=== Bangladesh ===
In Bangladesh, education is compulsory for 10 years and pupils will receive a secondary school certificate. The HSC is the continuation of the "Secondary Education Courses" and it precedes the " Tertiary Education" governed by the Universities. Class XI - XII roughly covers the 16-17 age group in the context of Bangladesh.

After 10 years of schooling at the primary and secondary level, students who succeed in passing the Secondary School Certificate (SSC) examination have the option of joining a college for a two-year higher secondary education in respective areas of specialization or enrolling in a technical or polytechnic institute. After the two-year higher secondary education based on the national curriculum, students will sit the Higher Secondary Certificate public examination conducted by the education boards.

Students of Islamic religious and English medium streams also sit for their respective public examinations, Alim and A-Level, conducted by the Bangladesh Madrasah Education Board, London/Cambridge University and Pearson Edexcel to qualify for further education. Every year, the HSC exam usually starts in April in Bangladesh, and the exam timetable will be published two months before the examination.

There are nine Boards of Intermediate and Secondary Education responsible for conducting the public examinations also responsible for recognizing the private educational institutes.

Because of the COVID-19 pandemic, after a lot of speculation and considerations, the concerned authority decided not to arrange a HSC or equivalent examination for the year 2020. Results from two prior exams, JSC and SSC, were averaged and used as the score.

In 2021, the date and subjects of HSC exam were revised to abridge for the first time. The HSC Exam was held on 2 December and continued till 30 December with only three major subjects for the each group of the students. 26,784 institutions participated in the exam under nine education boards together with 16,35,240 candidates.

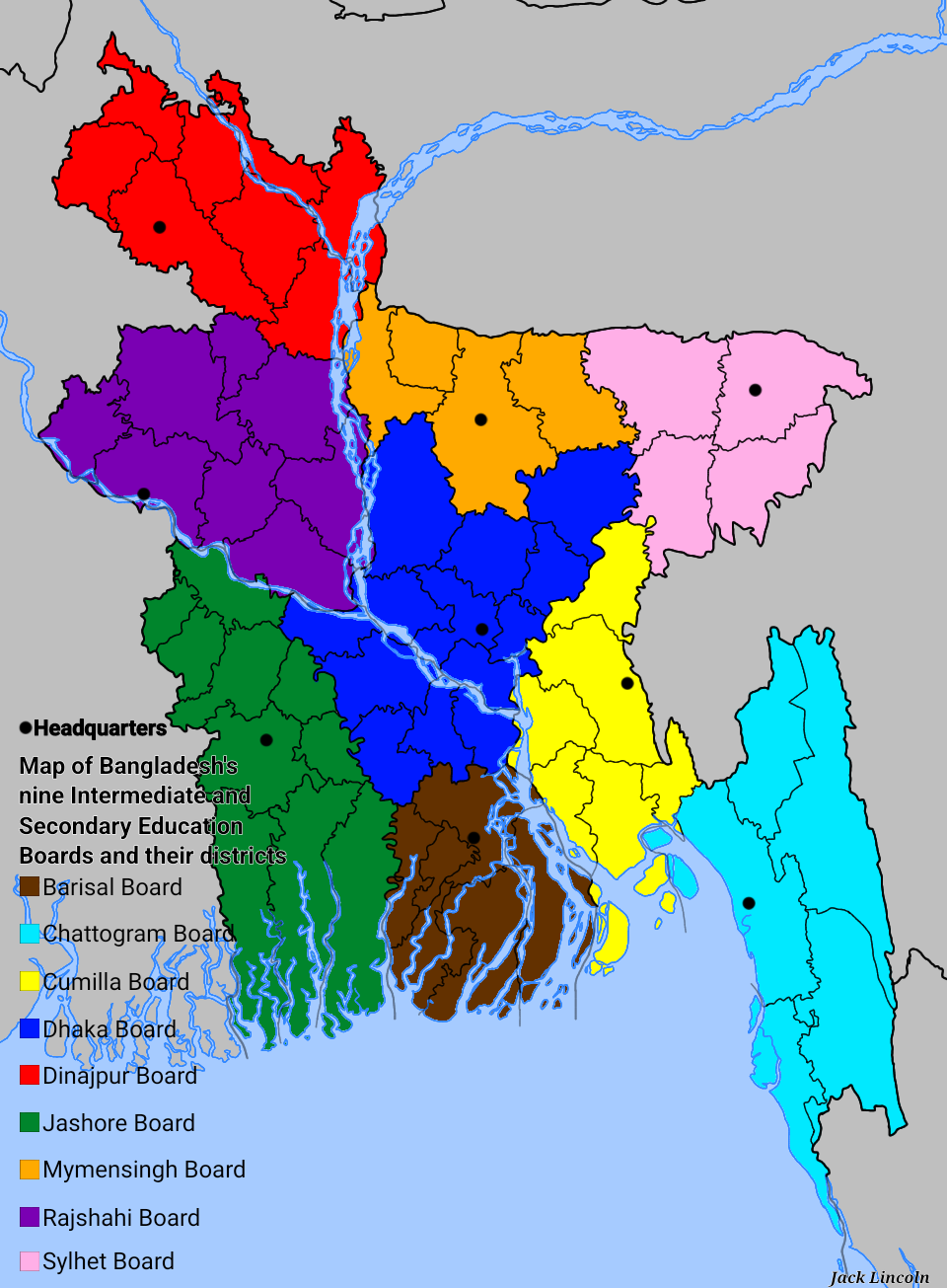
Intermediate and Secondary Education Boards in Bangladesh and their districts

The Board of Intermediate and Secondary Education conducts the public examinations.

There are eleven education Boards in Bangladesh: (Note: "The Ordinance of the Board" was controlled by the East Pakistan Intermediate and Secondary Education Ordinance, 1961 (East Pakistan Ordinance No. XXXIII of 1961) and its amendments No. XVI of 1962 and No. XVII of 1977.)

- Board of Intermediate and Secondary Education, Dhaka - established in 1961 (Note: Under the East Pakistan Ordinance No. XXXIII of 1961)
- Board of Intermediate and Secondary Education, Rajshahi - established in 1961 (Note: In pursuance of the Presidential Proclamation on the 7th October, 1958(East Pakistan Ordinance No. XXXIII of 1961).)
- Board of Intermediate and Secondary Education, Cumilla - established in 1962 (Note: in the pursuance of the amendments No. XVI of 1962)
- Board of Intermediate and Secondary Education, Jashore - established in 1963 (Note: by the Government Order- 737, named as "Intermediate and Secondary Education Board, Khulna Division, Jessore",renamed as "Intermediate and Secondary Education Board, Jessore" in 1965.)
- Board of Intermediate and Secondary Education, Chattogram
- Board of Intermediate and Secondary Education, Barishal
- Board of Intermediate and Secondary Education, Sylhet
- Board of Intermediate and Secondary Education, Dinajpur - established on 22 October 2006.
- Board of Intermediate and Secondary Education, Mymensingh-formed in August, 2017.
- Bangladesh Madrasah Education Board
- Bangladesh Technical Education Board - established on 7 March 1967 (Note: in pursuance of the Gazette no- 175)

The Board of Secondary and Higher Secondary Education in Bangladesh recognises "Higher Secondary Education" under the clause 1(5) of the "Board of Trustees". Higher Secondary Education comprises (a) general, (b) vocational, (c) technical, or (d) special education with the combination of varied courses.

The Madrassa Education Board was established under "The Madrasa Education Ordinance No. IX of 1978" in 1978.

The Chittagong Education Board was established on 15 May 1995.

The Barisal Education Board was established on 23 August 1999.

The Sylhet Board was established in 1999.

=== India ===
In India, Schooling is compulsory for students aged between 6 to 14 years old, which is from Grade 1st-8th. After completing 2 more years of schooling, the students receive Secondary School certificate. SSC is conducted at state level by the state boards of education and at the national level by the Central Board of Secondary Education.

Student can start their Higher Secondary education after completing standard 10th. They have to study for 2 more years to get the Higher Secondary Certificate. Which can be used to start pursuing a degree.

Grade 11-12th students have to study a total of six subjects; out of these, There are 5 main and one additional subject, which are different in each State Board.

The exam consists a total of 1100 marks: 550 in HSC 1 and 550 in HSC 2. Students can sit supplementary/improvement exams in September/October.

The HSC/Intermediate and PUC Certificates are known as the "Class 12th Certificate" or the "+2 Certificate". It is awarded to senior high school students by almost all National and State Boards and It is also awarded to junior college students by some state boards. There are eleven exam boards across India and each will have a slightly different name for the exam, for example, Higher Secondary Exam, PUC Exam, Intermediate Exam, SSC (Senior School Certificate) Exam, etc.

State boards of education are;

- Kerala Board of Higher Secondary Examinations (KBHSE),
- Board of Secondary Education, Rajasthan (BSER),
- Maharashtra State Board of Secondary and Higher Secondary Education, (MSBSHSE),
- Board of Intermediate Education, Andhra Pradesh (BIE, AP),
- Telangana Board of Intermediate Education (TGBIE),
- State Board of School Examinations (Sec.) & Board of Higher Secondary Examinations, Tamil Nadu (SBSEBHSE),
- Odisha Council of Higher Secondary Education, (CHSE, Odisha)
- Karnataka School Examination and Assessment Board (KSEAB),
- West Bengal Council of Higher Secondary Education (WBCHSE),
- Bihar School Examination Board (BSEB)
- Punjab School Education Board (PSEB)
- Gujarat Secondary and Higher Secondary Education Board( GSEB/ GSHEB)

National boards of education are;

- Central Board of Secondary Education (CBSE) who offer the All India Senior School Certificate Examination (AISSCE),
- Council for the Indian School Certificate Examination (CISCE) who offer the Indian School Certificate (ISC),
- National Institute of Open Schooling (NIOS).

The CBSE and CISCE conducts the exam once a year and NIOS twice a year in public examinations with an option of on-demand examinations.

=== Pakistan ===
The Higher Secondary School Certificate (HSSC), also known as Intermediate, is a public examination taken by students at Higher Secondary School or Intermediate college (Junior college) in Pakistan.

After finishing Matriculation in Grade 9 and 10, the students then enter an intermediate college and complete grades 11 and 12. Upon completion of each of the two grades, they again take standardized tests in their academic subjects. They are offered by 4 provincial boards at provincial level and by FBISE at the federal level. Upon successful completion of these examinations, students are awarded the Higher Secondary School Certificate (HSSC). This level of education is also called the FSc/FA/ICS.

There are many streams students can choose for their 11 and 12 grades, including pre-medical, pre-engineering, humanities (or social sciences), computer science and commerce. Each stream consists of three electives and as well as three compulsory subjects of English, Urdu, Islamiyat/Ethics (for non-muslims) (grade 11 only) and Pakistan Studies (grade 12 only).
