= Madhavan Mukund =

Indian computer scientist

- Born: 1 May 1965 (age 61)
- Education: Aarhus University; Indian Institute of Technology, Bombay
- Scientific career
- Fields: Computer Science
- Workplaces: Chennai Mathematical Institute

Madhavan Mukund (born 1 May 1965) is a professor and a Director of Computer Science at Chennai Mathematical Institute, a research and education institute in Chennai, India. He has served as President of Indian Association for Research in Computing Science (IARCS) from 2011 to 2017 and President of Association for Computing Machinery (India Council) from 2016 to 2018. He was elected Fellow of the Indian Academy of Sciences in 2018. He has been the National Coordinator of the Indian Computing Olympiad since 2001.He is also serving as a member of National Statistical Commission, Government of India, from 2026 onwards.

He did his B.Tech. in Computer Science and Engineering at Indian Institute of Technology, Bombay in 1986, and his PhD in Computer Science at Aarhus University in Denmark in 1992.

His research interests include models for concurrent and distributed systems, formal verification and distributed algorithms.
