= Saibal Chattopadhyay =

Indian academic and management professor

- Born: 18 August 1960 (age 65); India
- Citizenship: India
- Scientific career
- Fields: Operations Management
- Institutions: Indian Institute of Management Calcutta

Saibal Chattopadhyay (born 18 August 1960) is an Indian academic and management professor. He was the Director of Indian Institute of Management Calcutta from 2013 to 2018.

He currently leads the design and development of academic programmes at The Chatterjee Group Centres for Research and Education in Science and Technology (TCG CREST). In this role, he has been responsible for conceptualizing and developing the institute's educational initiatives in artificial intelligence and related disciplines. He played a leading role in the establishment of the M.Sc. programme in Frontier Intelligence and Autonomous Agents (FIAA), overseeing its curriculum design, programme structure, and academic framework. The programme emphasizes interdisciplinary training in artificial intelligence, autonomous systems, machine learning, and related emerging technologies, with a focus on research-driven education and industry engagement. He also currently serves as Chairman of the National Statistical Commission, Government of India, from 2026 onwards.

Chattopadhyay is a former Professor in the Operations Management group at IIM Calcutta, and is a former Dean of the business school. In the past, he has been associated with Presidency College of the University of Calcutta, University of Connecticut and University of Nebraska–Lincoln.
