= Chennai Mathematical Institute =

Research and education institute in Chennai, India

Coordinates: 12°49′42.34″N 80°13′12.33″E

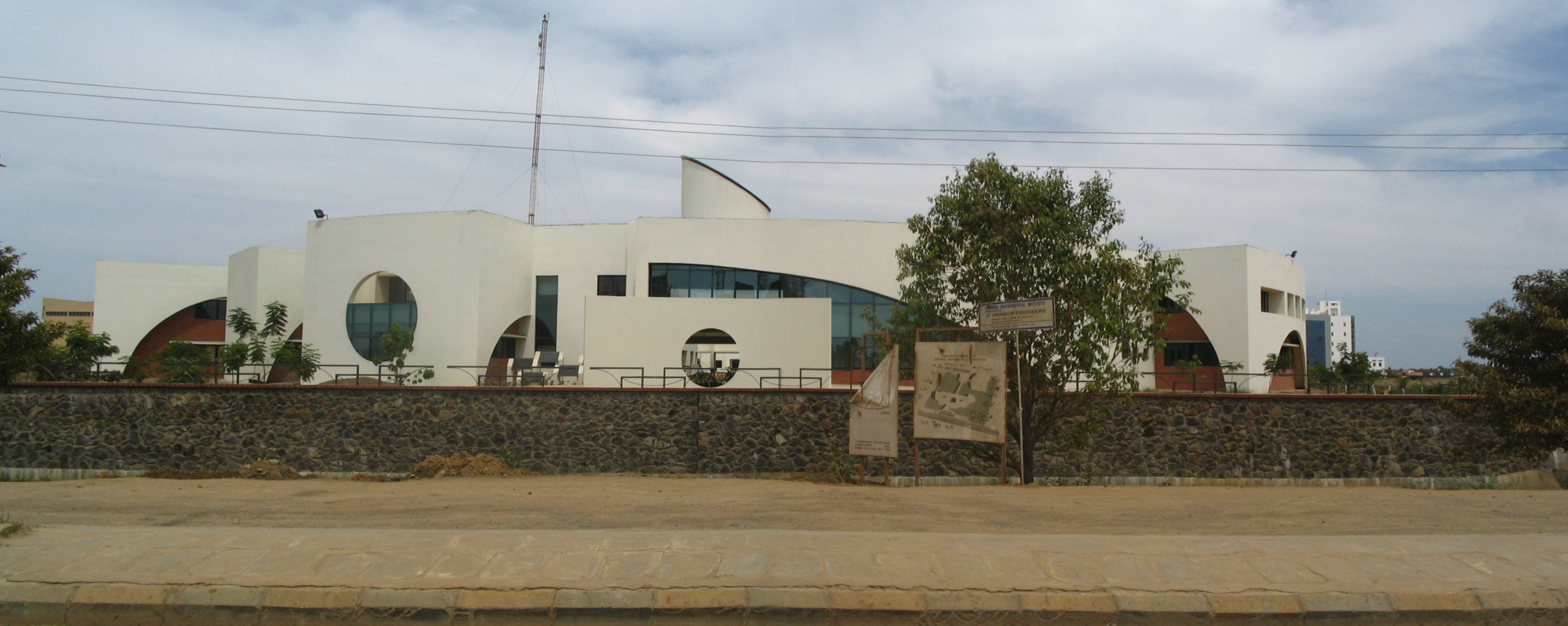
- Main building of the CMI
- Former names: School of Mathematics, SPIC Science Foundation (1989–1996); SPIC Mathematical Institute (1996–1998)
- Type: Research and Education Institution
- Established: 1989; 37 years ago
- Dean: K. V. Subrahmanyam
- Director: Madhavan Mukund
- Director Emeritus: C. S. Seshadri
- Location: Chennai, Tamil Nadu, India
- Campus: Suburban, 5.4 acre
- Acronym: CMI
- Website: www.cmi.ac.in

Chennai Mathematical Institute (CMI) is a higher education and research institute in Chennai, India. It was founded in 1989 by the SPIC Science Foundation, and offers undergraduate and postgraduate programmes in physics, mathematics and computer science. CMI is noted for its research in algebraic geometry, in particular in the area of moduli of bundles.

CMI was at first located in T. Nagar in the heart of Chennai in an office complex. It moved to a new 5-acre (20,000 m^{2}) campus in Siruseri in October 2005.

In December 2006, CMI was recognized as a university under Section 3 of the University Grants Commission (UGC) Act 1956, making it a deemed university. Until then, the teaching program was offered in association with Bhoj Open University, as it offered more flexibility.

== History ==
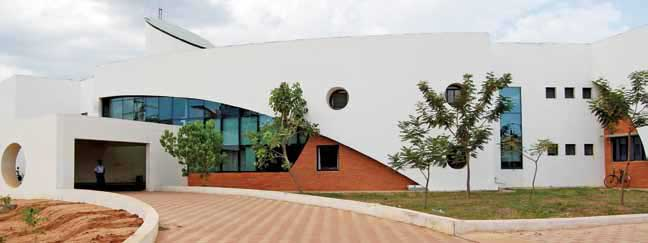
CMI Main Building

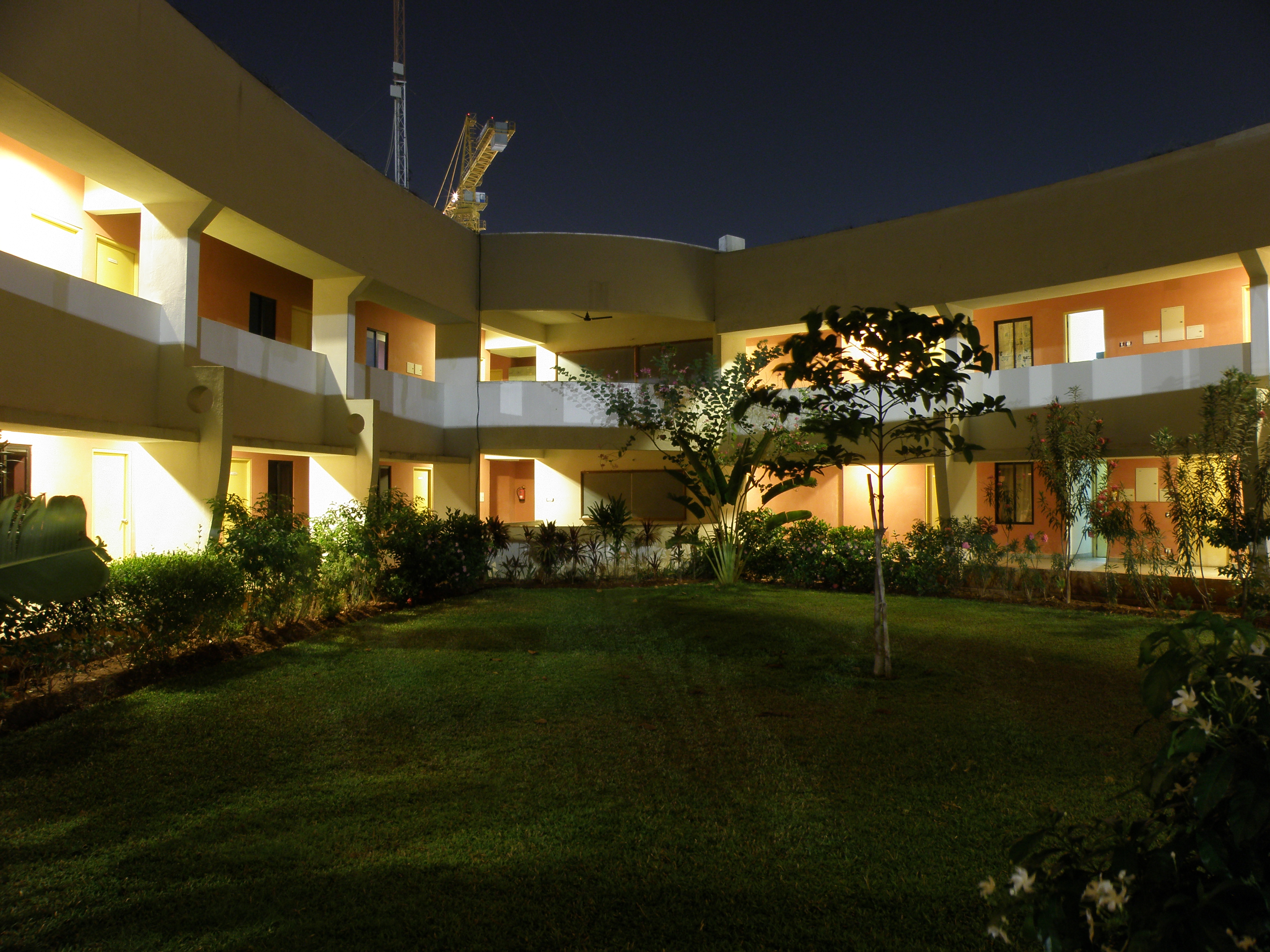
CMI Academic Block

CMI began as the School of Mathematics, SPIC Science Foundation, in 1989. The SPIC Science Foundation was set up in 1986 by Southern Petrochemical Industries Corporation (SPIC) Ltd., one of the major industrial houses in India, to foster the growth of science and technology in the country.

In 1996, the School of Mathematics became an independent institution and changed its name to SPIC Mathematical Institute. In 1998, in order to better reflect the emerging role of the institute, it was renamed the Chennai Mathematical Institute (CMI).

From its inception, the institute has had a Ph.D. programme in Mathematics and Computer Science. In the initial years, the Ph.D. programme was affiliated to the BITS, Pilani and the University of Madras. In December 2006, CMI was recognized as a university under Section 3 of the UGC Act 1956.

In 1998, CMI took the initiative to bridge the gap between teaching and research by starting B.Sc.(Hons.) and M.Sc. programmes in Mathematics and allied subjects. In 2001, the B.Sc. programme was extended to incorporate two courses with research components, leading to an M.Sc. degree in mathematics and an M.Sc. degree in Computer Science. In 2003, a new undergraduate course was added, leading to a B.Sc. degree in physics.

In 2010, CMI launched a summer fellowship programme whereby they invited about 30 students from all over India to work under the faculty at CMI on various research projects.

Later, in 2012, the B.Sc. degree in Physics was restructured as an integrated B.Sc. degree in Mathematics and Physics.

== Campus ==
CMI moved into its new campus on 5 acres (20,000 m^{2}) of land at the SIPCOT Information Technology Park in Siruseri in October, 2005. The campus is located along the Old Mahabalipuram Road, which is developing as the IT corridor to the south of the city.

The library block and the student's hostel were completed in late 2006 and become operational from January 2007.

In 2006, CMI implemented a grey water recycling system on its campus. The system was designed for CMI by Sultan Ahmed Ismail to treat waste water produced after cleaning, washing and bathing to be used for gardening or ground water recharge.

Construction is underway for a new building that will house an auditorium, accommodation for guests, as well as additional academic space - faculty offices, library and lecture halls. This construction is funded by a grant from the Ministry of Human Resource Development through the University Grants Commission.

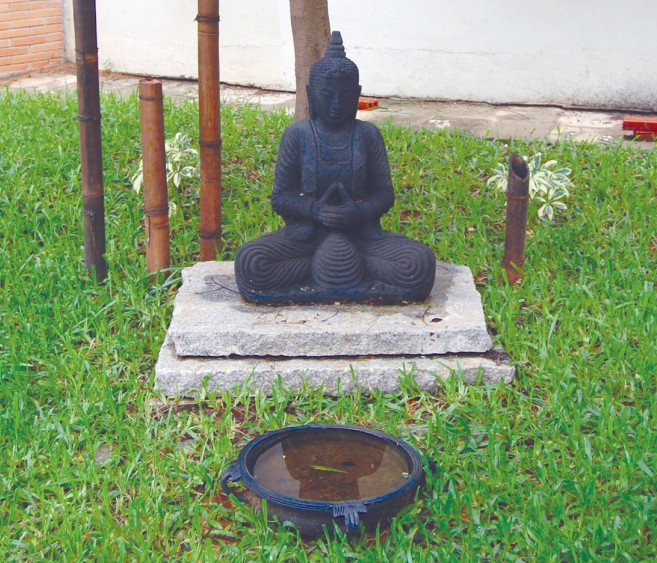
Statue of Lord Buddha in Academic Block

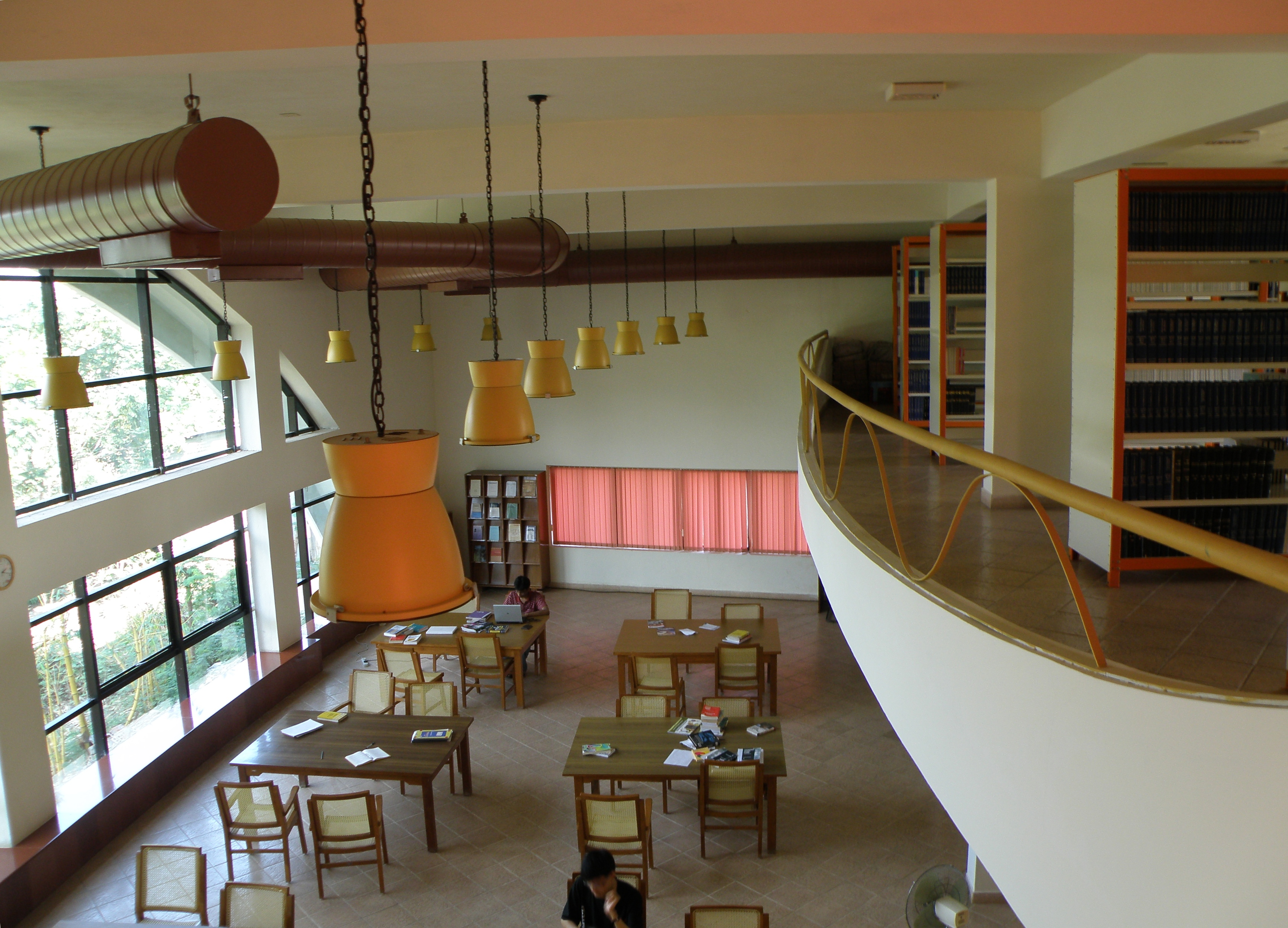
Library

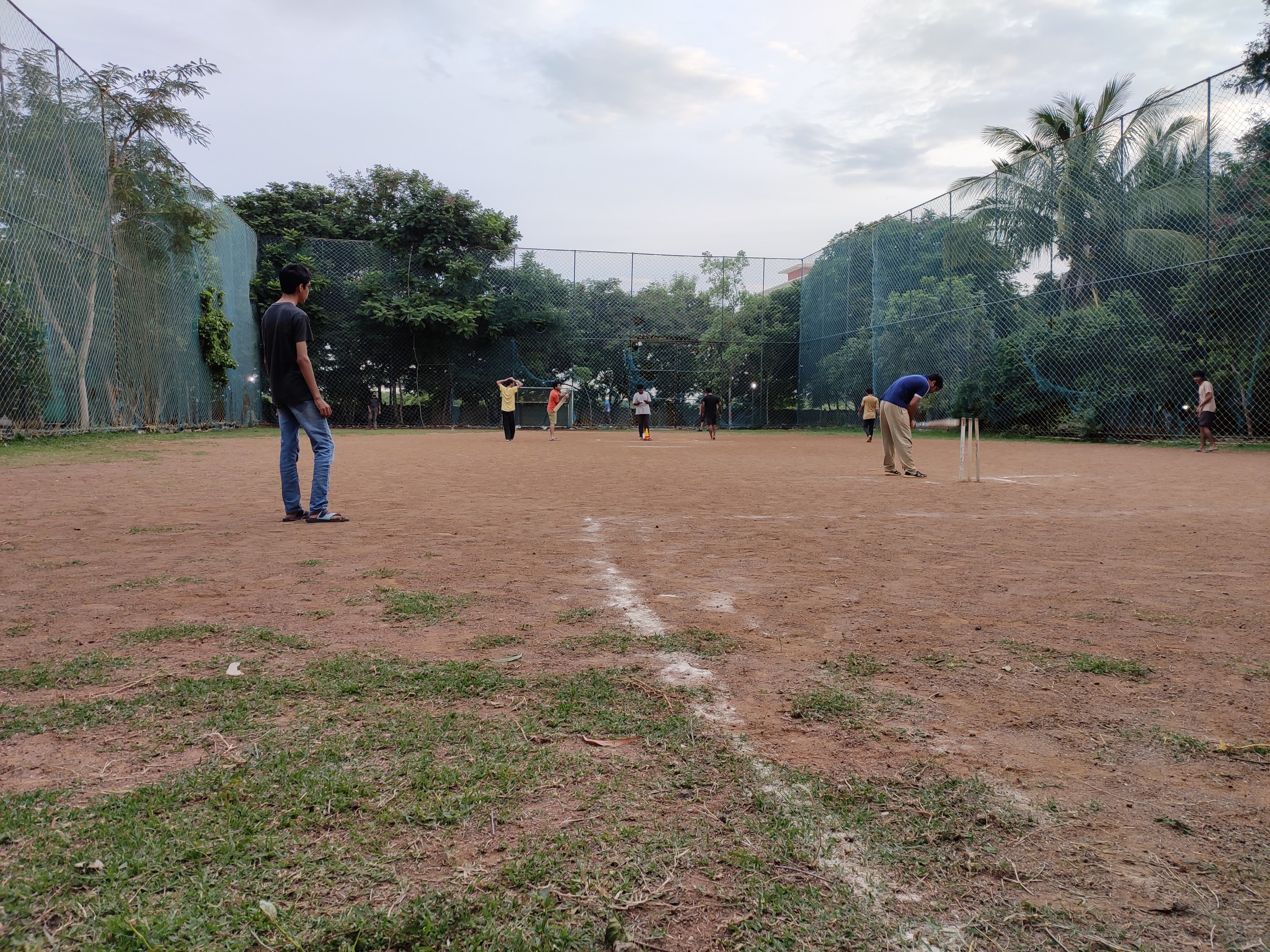
Cricket ground

== Organisation and administration ==
=== Director ===
The founding director of CMI was C. S. Seshadri, who was known for his work in the area of algebraic geometry, especially moduli problems and algebraic groups. He stepped down in 2010, after which Rajeeva L. Karandikar was appointed as director. Prof. Seshadri continued as Emeritus Director until his demise on 17 July 2020. Professor Madhavan Mukund was appointed as the new director in 2021.

=== Funding ===
CMI's funding comes from both private and government sources.

==== Government funding ====
- DAE: CMI receives support for its teaching programme from the Department of Atomic Energy, through the National Board of Higher Mathematics.
- ISRO: The Indian Space Research Organization also funds CMI substantially.
- DST and DRDO: For some of its projects, CMI receives funding from the Department of Science and Technology as well as the Defence Research and Development Organization.

==== Private funding ====
- The Southern Petrochemical Industries Corporation (SPIC) was an important founder of CMI during its initial years. In fact, CMI started as the Spic Mathematical Institute.
- Sriram Group of Companies is an important funder and also arranges for other funding for CMI.
- Matrix Laboratories has made a major contribution to the new campus at the SIPCOT IT Park.
- Infosys Foundation recently donated a large corpus to CMI to enhance faculty compensation and fellowships for students.

== Academics ==
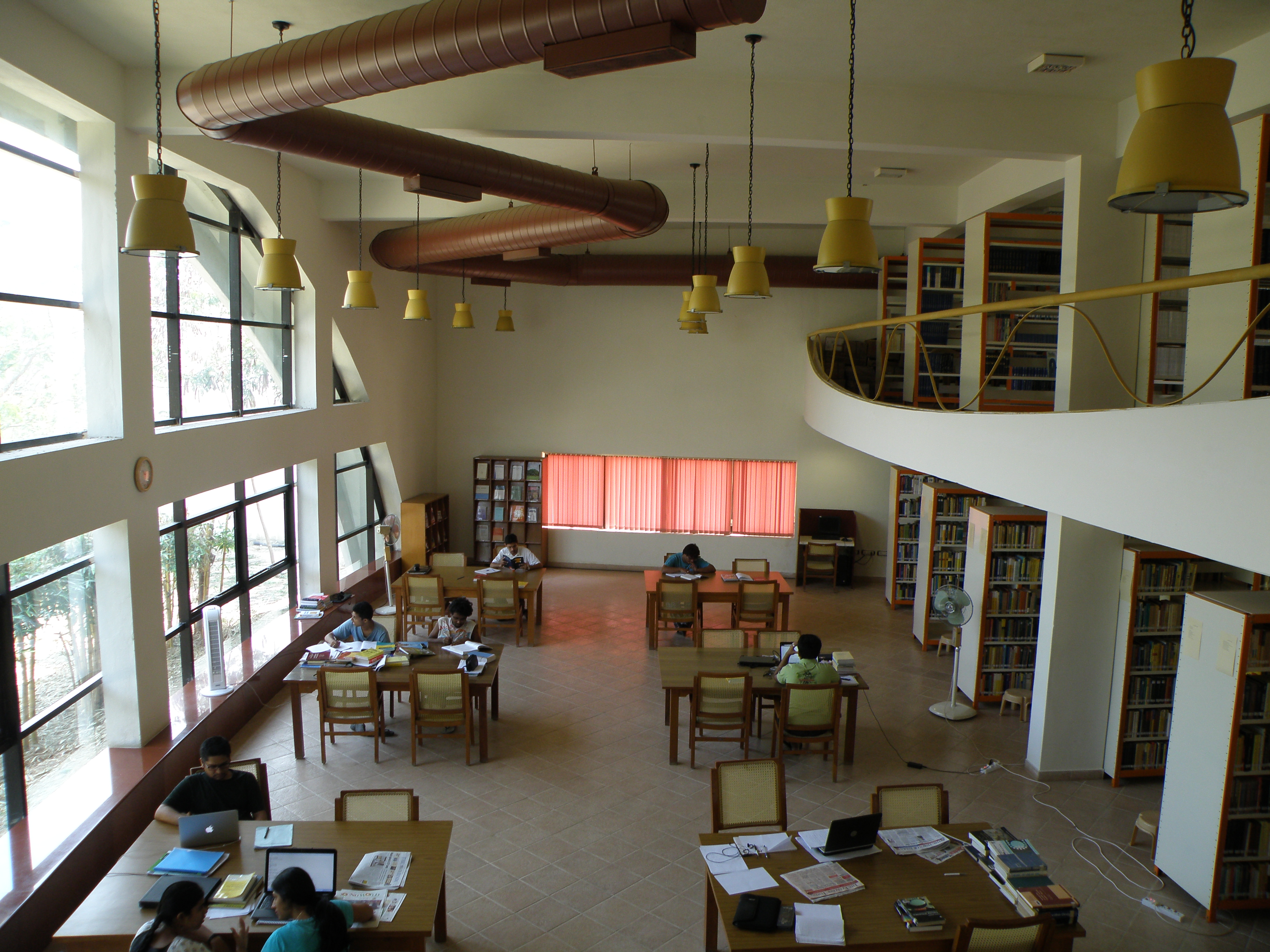
Library

=== Academic programmes ===
CMI has Ph.D. programmes in Computer Sciences, Mathematics and Physics. Recently, CMI has introduced the possibility of students pursuing a part-time Ph.D. at the institute.

Since 1998, CMI has offered a B.Sc.(Hons) degree in Mathematics and Computer Science. This three-year program also includes courses in Humanities and Physics. Many students, after completion of the B.Sc. degree, have pursued higher studies in Mathematics and Computer Sciences from universities both in India and abroad. Some students also go into industry while others take up subjects such as finance.

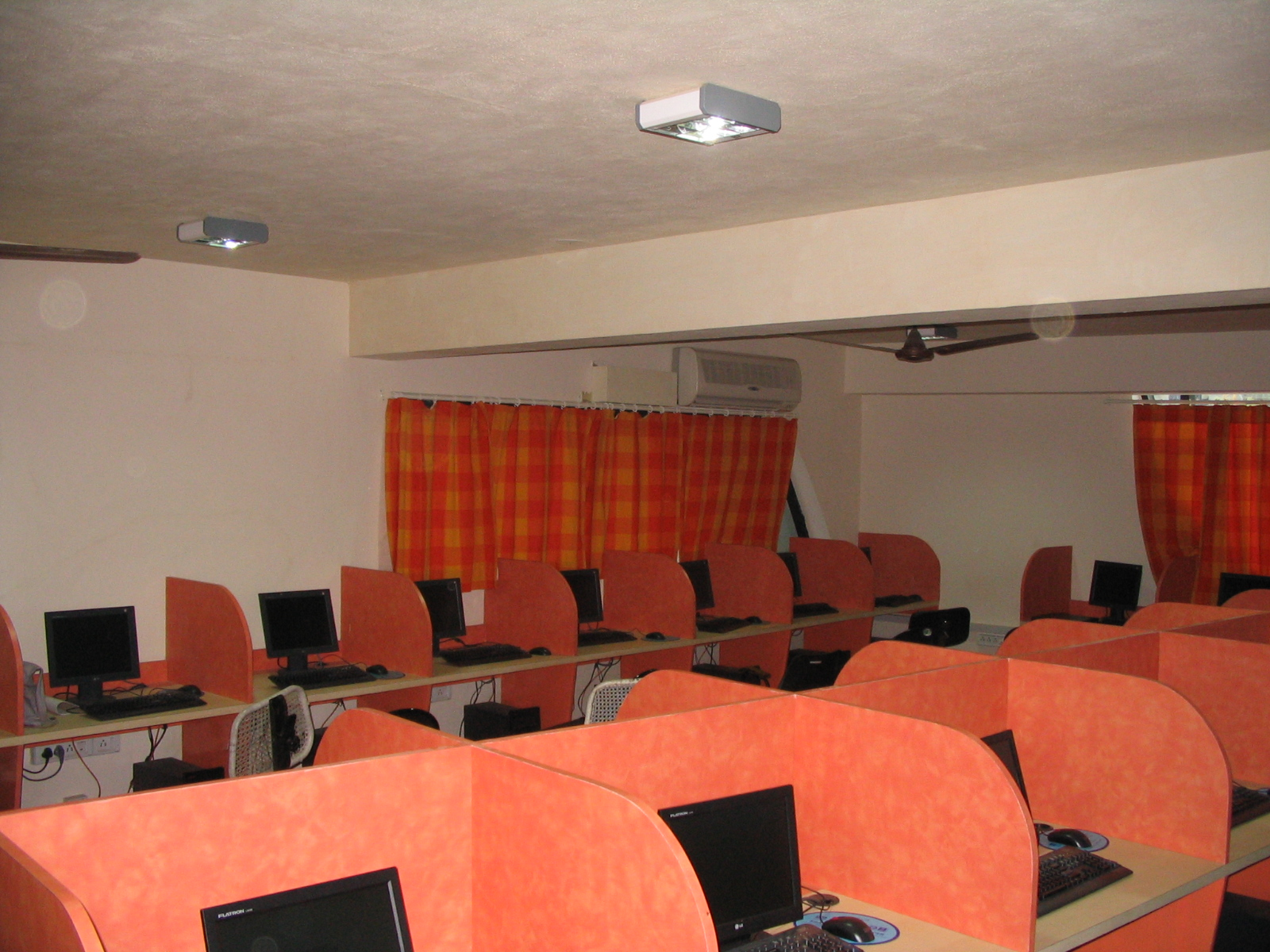
Computer lab

In 2001, CMI began separate M.Sc. programmes in Mathematics and in Computer Science. In 2009, CMI began to offer a new programme M.Sc. in Applied Mathematics, which was replaced with a new M.Sc. in Data Science programme in 2018.

In 2003, CMI introduced a new three-year programme in the form of a B.Sc.(Hons) degree in physics. The course topics are largely in theoretical physics. CMI now has its own physics laboratory. From the academic year 2007–2008, the Physics students are having regular lab courses right from the first year. In the academic year 2005–2006, lab sessions for third-year students were conducted at IIT Madras based on an agreement. In the summer following their first year, physics students go to HBCSE (under TIFR) in Mumbai for practical sessions and in the second year, they go to IGCAR, Kalpakkam. However, in 2012, the B.Sc. degree in Physics was restructured as an integrated B.Sc. degree in Mathematics and Physics.

Degrees for the B.Sc. and M.Sc. programmes were earlier offered by MPBOU, the Madhya Pradesh Bhoj Open University and doctoral degrees by Madras University. After CMI became a deemed university, it gives its own degrees. CMI awarded its first official degrees in August 2007.

The batch sizes typically vary from 10 to 50 and the overall strength of CMI is about 150–200 students and 40–50 faculty members.

Nearly all the CMI programmes are run in conjunction and coordination with programmes at IMSc, an institute for research in Mathematics, Theoretical Computer Science and Theoretical Physics, located in Chennai.

=== Admission criteria ===
The entrance to each of these courses is based on a nationwide entrance test. The advertisement for this entrance test appears around the end of February or the beginning of March. The entrance test is held in the end of May and is usually scheduled so as not to clash with major entrance examinations. Results are given to students by the end of June.

Students who have passed the Indian National Mathematics Olympiad get direct admission to the programme B.Sc.(Hons.) in Mathematics and Computer Science, and those who have passed the Indian National Physics Olympiad are offered direct entry to the B.Sc.(Hons.) in Physics programme. However, these students are also advised to fill in and send the application form some time in March.

Students who have qualified for the International Olympiad in Informatics Training Camp (IOITC), or have received a gold or silver medal at the Indian National Olympiad in Informatics (INOI) in Class 11 or Class 12 are offered direct entry to the B.Sc.(Hons.) in Mathematics and Computer Science. Source

=== Fee structure and other payments ===
Till 2018, all students, including undergraduate students, were given a monthly stipend, subject to academic performance. The tuition was waived for students in good academic standing. In 2018, the fees were increased for all students with waivers available for students in good academic standing.

=== Arrangements with other Institutes ===
- Till 2006, students received their B.Sc. and M.Sc. degrees from MPBOU and their Ph.D. degrees from Madras University.
- CMI conducts its academic programmes in conjunction with IMSc, so students from either institute can take courses at the other.
- CMI has agreements with TIFR (Tata Institute of Fundamental Research) and with the Indian Statistical Institutes in Delhi, Bangalore, Chennai and Kolkata, for cooperation on the furtherance of mathematical sciences.
- The physics programmes are run in conjunction with IMSc and IGCAR. The physics students spend one summer in HBCSE (under TIFR) in Mumbai and another in IGCAR, Kalpakkam, garnering practical experience.
- CMI has a memorandum of understanding with the École Normale Supérieure in Paris. Under this memorandum, research scholars from the ENS spend a semester in CMI. In exchange, three B.Sc. Mathematics students, at the end of their third year, go to the ENS for two months.
- The institute has a similar arrangement with École Polytechnique in Paris, whereby top-ranking senior B.Sc. Physics students spend the summer in Paris working with the faculty at École Polytechnique.
- CMI has a memorandum of understanding with IFMR, the Institute of Financial Management and Research, located in Nungambakkam, Chennai. Students from CMI getting a CGPA of more than 8.50 are offered direct admission to IFMR's one-year programme in Financial Mathematics, which is sponsored by ICICI Bank. Faculty from CMI are involved in teaching this programme. In exchange, CMI gets its Economics professor from IFMR.
- CMI is a part of ReLaX, an Indo-French joint research unit dedicated to research in theoretical computer science, its applications and its interactions with mathematics. This collaboration allows for collaborative work in computer science, academic visits for professors and graduate students, summer internship programs for students, and organizing conferences in the subject.
- CMI has had two sponsored research projects with Honeywell Technology Solutions, Bangalore, both in the area of formal verification.

== Research ==
In mathematics, the main areas of research activity have been in algebraic geometry, representation theory, operator algebra, commutative algebra, harmonic analysis, control theory and game theory. Research work includes stratification of binary forms in representation theory, the Donaldson-Uhlenbeck compactification in algebraic geometry, stochastic games, inductive algebras of harmonic analysis, etc.

The research activity in theoretical computer science at CMI has been primarily in computational complexity theory, specification and verification of timed and distributed systems and analysis of security protocols. A computer scientist at CMI extended the deterministic isolation technique for reachability in planar graphs to obtain better complexity upper bounds for planar bipartite matching.

In theoretical physics, research is being carried out mainly in string theory, quantum field theory and mathematical physics. In mathematical physics, research included developing a path integral approach to quantum entanglement. CMI string theorists study problems such as Big Bang like cosmological singularities, embeddings of BKL cosmology, dyons in super-Yang–Mills theories etc.

== Student life ==
=== Hostel ===
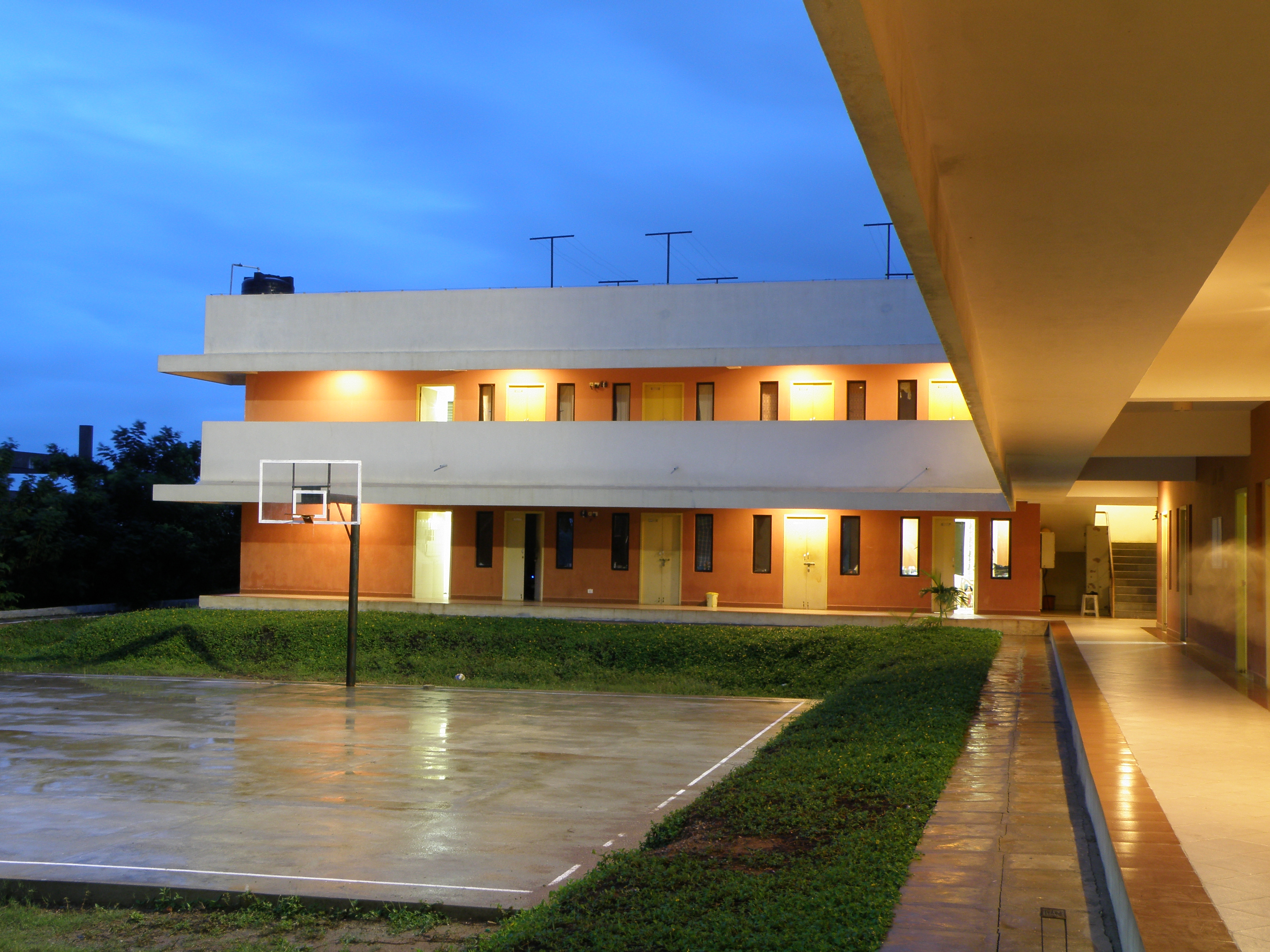
Hostel

The on-campus hostel was opened in January 2007. All students are expected to stay in the hostel. Security guards are posted in the campus round the clock, including women security guards for the girls wing on all floors. Washing machines are installed in the hostel which is managed by the students. A vehicle is parked in the campus at night for emergencies. Wi-fi facility is available in the campus.

=== Annual Inter-Collegiate Student Festival ===
The students of CMI organize an annual inter-collegiate student festival Tessellate (earlier known as Fiesta, renamed in 2018), supported by corporations, IT companies, and local businesses. Tessellate enjoys participation from students of several Chennai-based colleges including IIT Madras, SRM Institute of Science and Technology, Sathyabama University, KCG College of Technology. Tessellate comprises academic, cultural, technical and sports events. From 2018, Tessellate also includes a social initiative for the benefit of the underprivileged in Chennai.

=== S.T.E.M.S. ===
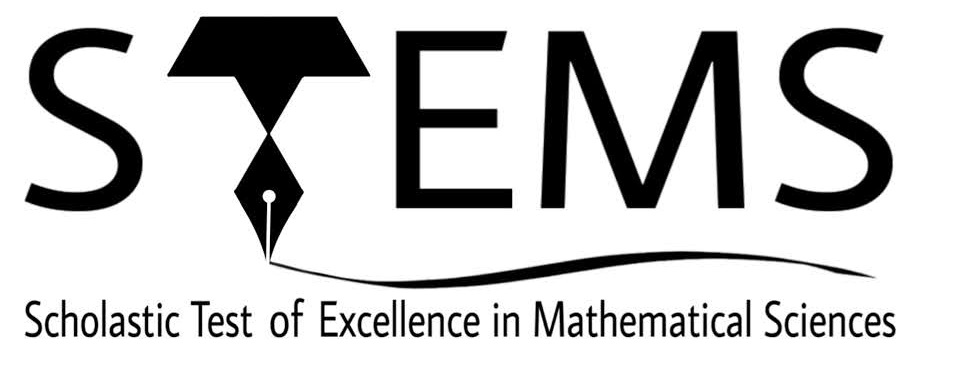
S.T.E.M.S. (Scholastic Test of Excellence in Mathematical Sciences)

Also, as a part of Tessellate, a nationwide contest called S.T.E.M.S. (Scholastic Test of Excellence in Mathematical Sciences) is organised for students from 8th grade to Final year UG in different categories for the subjects: Mathematics, Physics and Computer Science. Toppers get to win exciting prizes and are invited to a fully funded 3-day camp at CMI.

=== Other activities ===
CMI faculty coordinate the training and selection of students to represent India at the International Olympiad in Informatics through the Indian Association for Research in Computing Science (IARCS). CMI hosts the official IARCS website. From September 2004, a monthly online programming competition has been conducted by the CMI faculty via the IARCS website. Two of CMI's faculty members, Madhavan Mukund and Narayan Kumar, lead the Indian team to the International Olympiad in Informatics (IOI). Madhavan Mukund is also the National Coordinator for the Indian Computing Olympiad.
