= Temuco Maquehue Airport =

Maquehue Airport Aeropuerto Maquehue
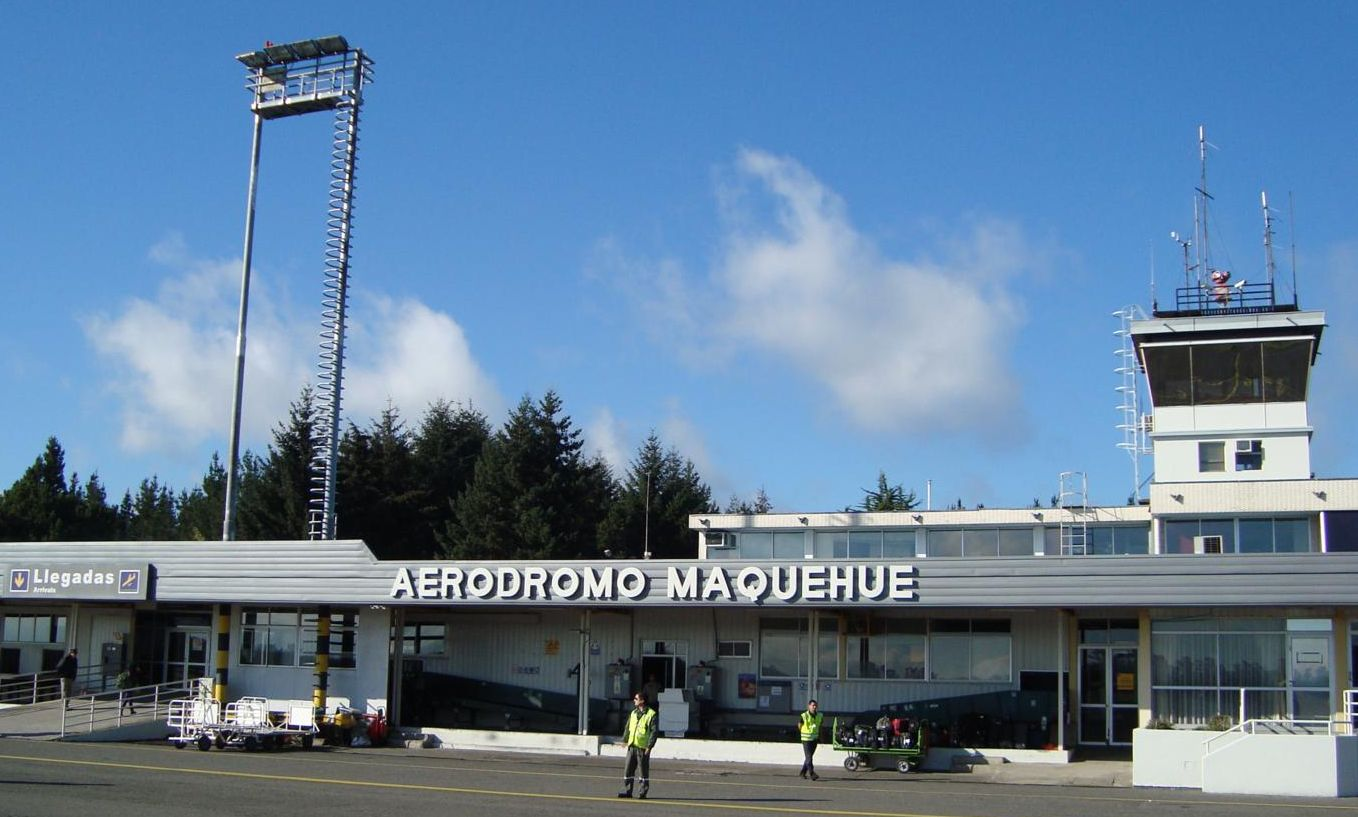
- IATA: PZS; ICAO: SCTC

Summary
- Airport type: Private
- Serves: Temuco, Chile
- Elevation AMSL: 304 ft / 93 m
- Coordinates: 38°46′00″S 72°38′10″W

Map
- Location of airport in Chile

Runways
Direction	Length		Surface
Direction	m	ft	Surface
06/24	1,700	5,577	Asphalt
07/25	544	1,785	Grass
- Sources: WAD GCM Google Maps

Maquehue Airport (Spanish: Aeropuerto Maquehue) (IATA: PZS, ICAO: SCTC) is an airport 5 kilometres (3.1 mi) southwest of Temuco, a city in the La Araucanía Region of Chile.

Runway 06 has a 150 metres (490 ft) displaced threshold. The Temuco non-directional beacon (Ident: TCO) is 1.0 nautical mile (1.9 km) east of the airport.

This airport is closed to the public in 2014, and commercial flights have been relocated to La Araucanía International Airport.

== See also ==
- Transport in Chile
- List of airports in Chile
