= La Araucanía International Airport =

La Araucanía International Airport Temuco Airport
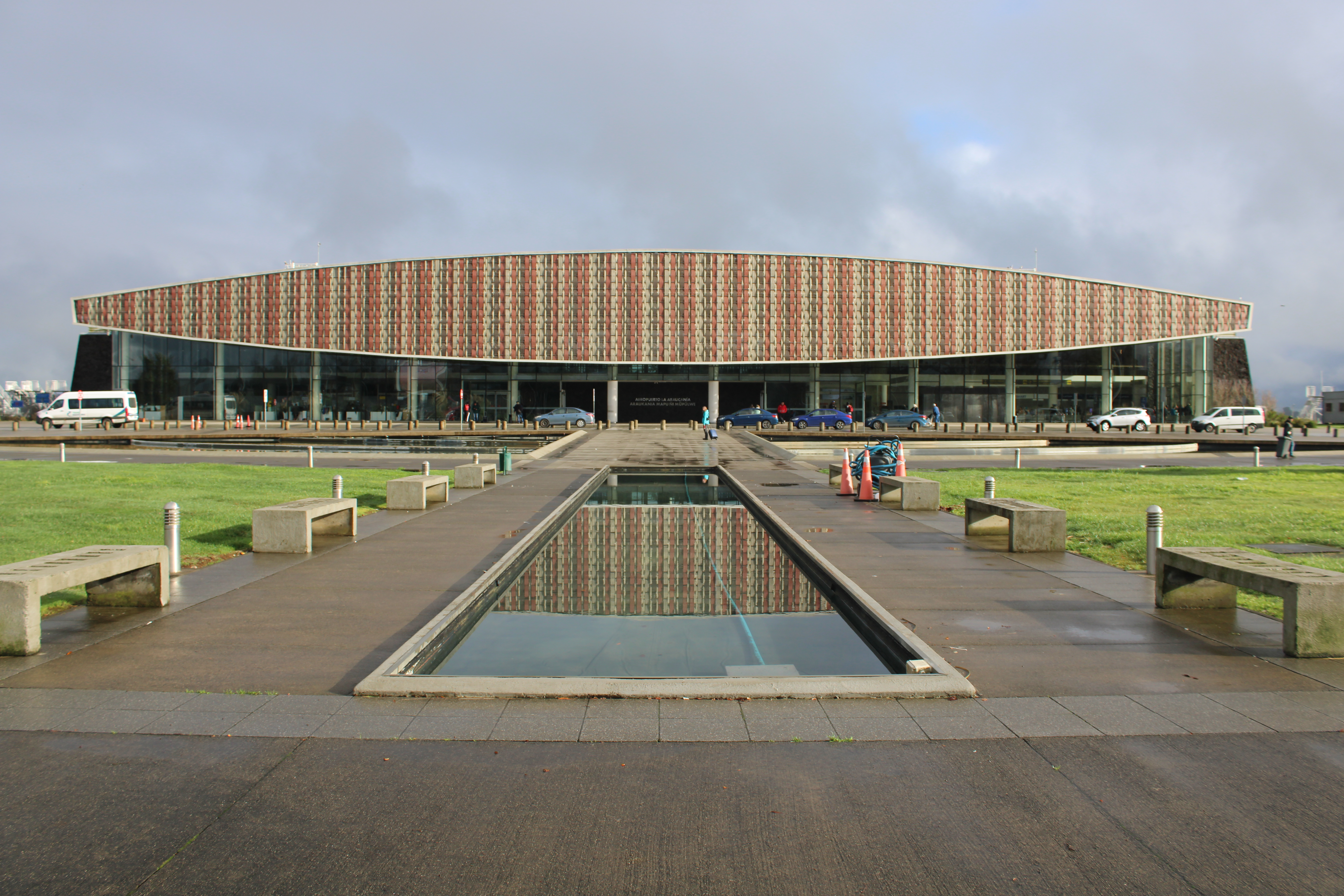
- Terminal exterior in 2024
- IATA: ZCO; ICAO: SCQP

Summary
- Airport type: Public
- Operator: Sociedad Concesionaria Aeropuerto Araucanía S.A.
- Serves: Temuco, Chile
- Location: Freire
- Elevation AMSL: 321 ft (98 m)
- Coordinates: 38°55′30″S 72°39′05″W
- Website: aeropuertoaraucania.cl

Map
- Location of airport in Chile

Runways
Direction	Length		Surface
Direction	m	ft	Surface
01/19	2,440	8,005	Asphalt

Statistics (2014)
- Passengers: 504,147
- Sources: GCM Google Maps

La Araucanía International Airport (IATA: ZCO, ICAO: SCQP), also known as Temuco Airport, is the main airport in the Araucanía Region and southern Chile. It is 21 kilometres (13 mi) south of the city of Temuco, in the commune of Freire, Cautín Province.

It has a parking apron with capacity for 4 aircraft (up to Boeing 767 type), a 5,000-square-metre (54,000 sq ft) passenger terminal, and 3 boarding bridges.

The Araucania VOR-DME (Ident: NIA) is located 0.58 nautical miles (1.1 km) off the approach threshold of Runway 19.

== Commissioning ==
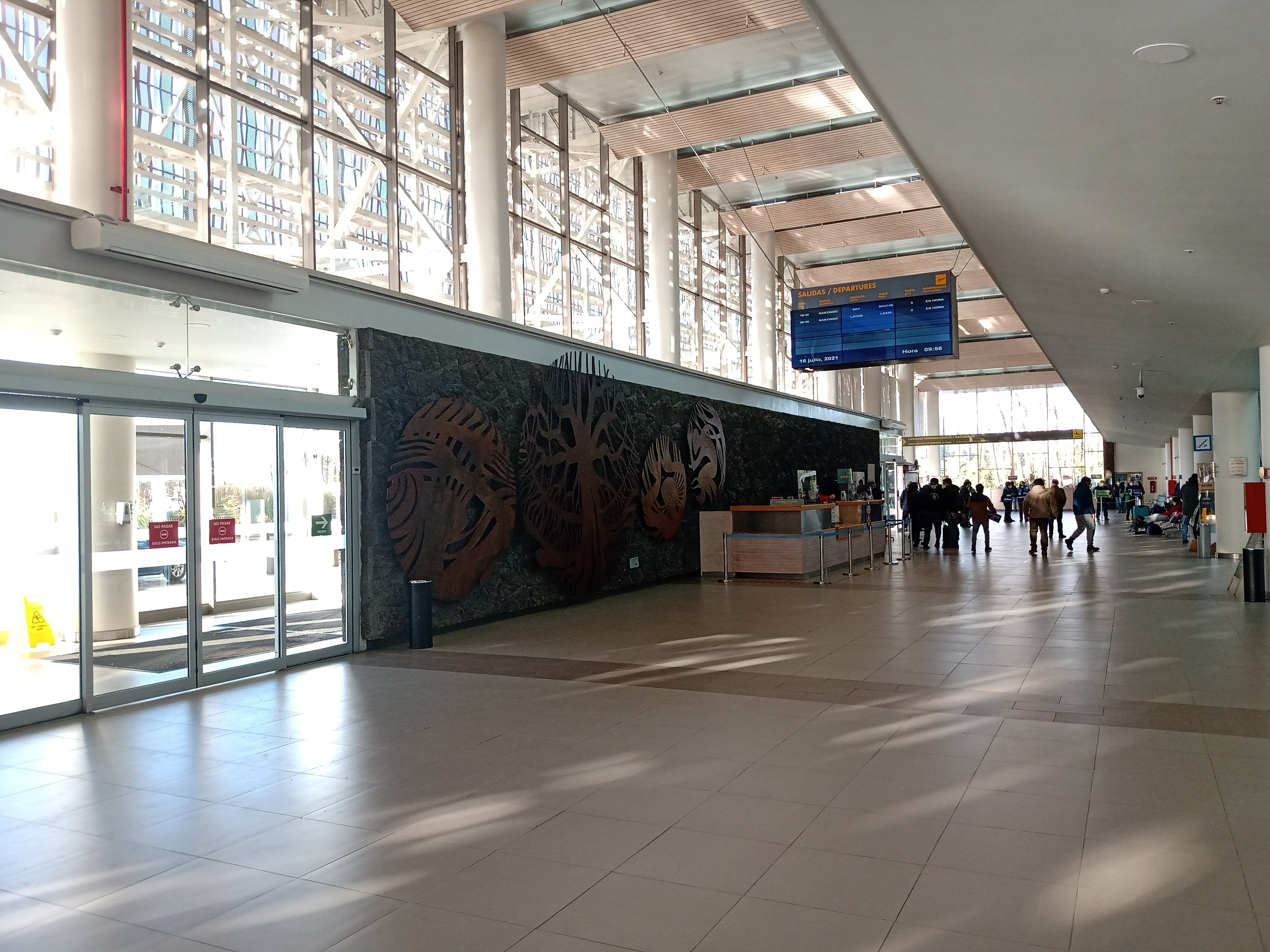
Terminal interior

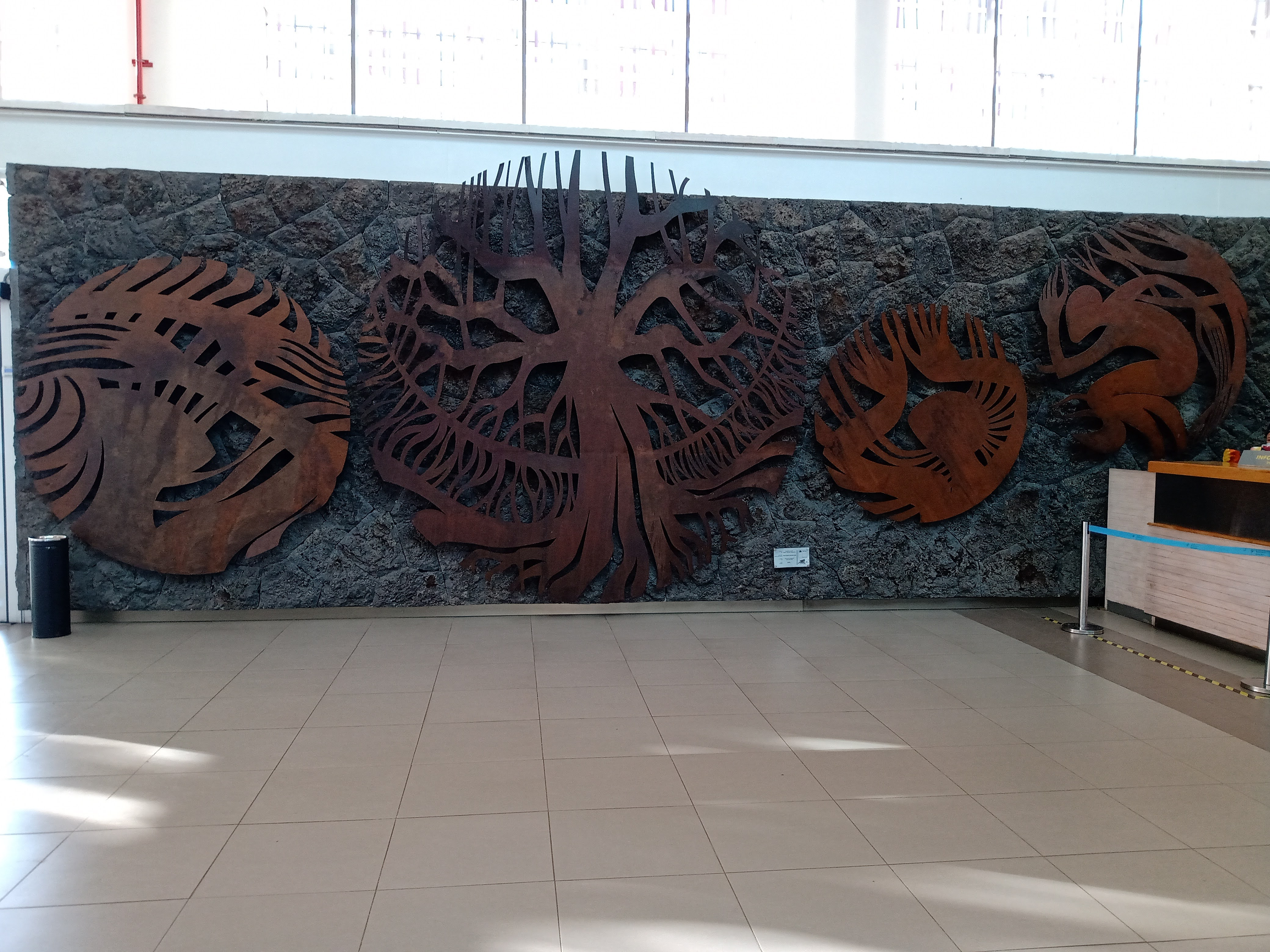
Decorative figures at the airport that incorporate elements of regional nature and the ancestral culture of the Mapuche people.

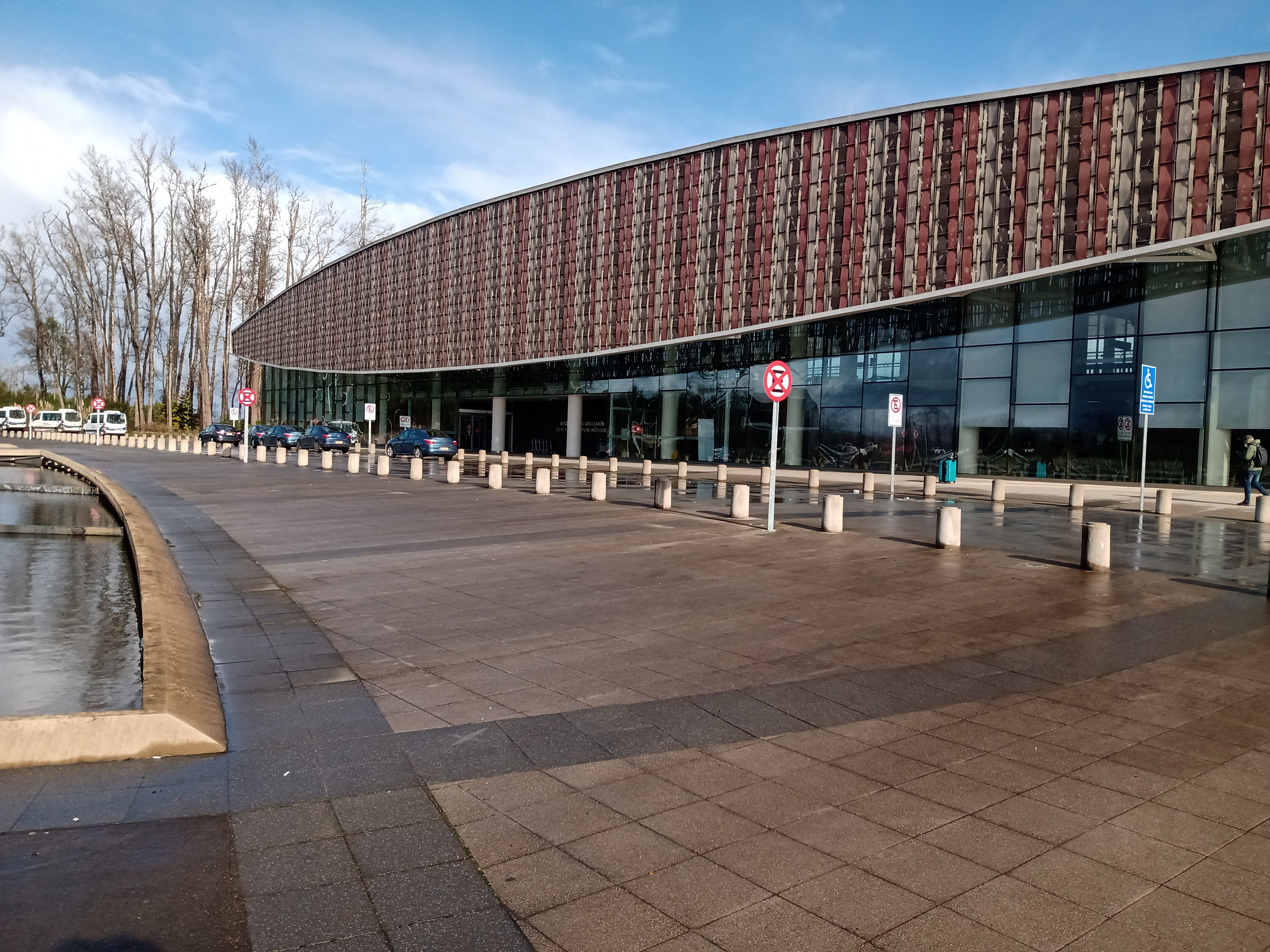
Terminal in 2021

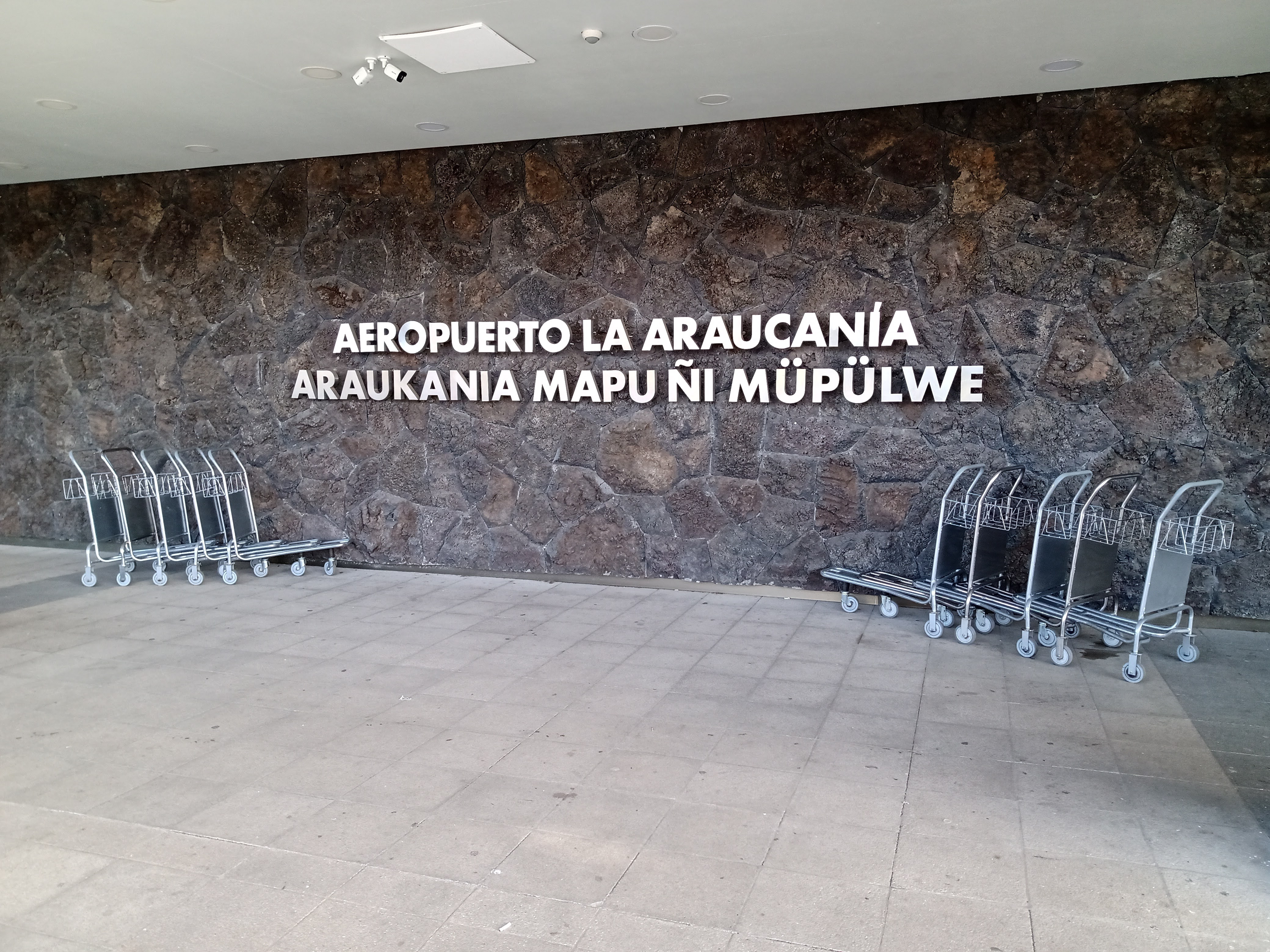
Airport name in Spanish and indigenous language Mapudungun

Through a NOTAM issued on July 18, 2014, the Directorate General of Civil Aviation (DGAC) authorized the start of operations of the new airport on Tuesday July 29, 2014 which was completed with the first landing of a commercial aircraft Sky Airline Airbus A320. At the same time, all flights were relocated from the former Temuco Maquehue Airport which ended operations day earlier.

== Airlines and destinations ==
Airlines	Destinations
JetSmart Chile	Punta Arenas, Santiago de Chile
LATAM Chile	Santiago de Chile
Sky Airline	Santiago de Chile

== See also ==
- Transport in Chile
- List of airports in Chile
