= Sargent Scheme =

1944 memorandum by the British Raj concerning literacy and education in india

The Sargent Scheme, formally known as the Report of the Sargent Commission on Post-War Education Development in India, was a 1944 memorandum prepared at the behest of the British-run Government of India that outlined the future development of literacy and education in India.

A central goal of the Sargent Scheme was the educational reconstruction of India. It recommended the introduction of free and compulsory education for all Indian children in the 6-11 years age group. The plan aimed to bring about universal literacy in India within 40 years of its introduction, i.e. by 1984. The scheme went as follows:

- Establishment of elementary schools and high schools.
- High schools of two types :

A. Academic.
B. Technical and Vocational

- Abolition of intermediate courses.

Although the 40 year time-frame was derided at the time by leaders of the Indian independence movement as being too long a period to achieve universal literacy, average literacy levels in post-independence India had only reached about 65% in 2008 (64 years after the scheme would have been launched) and were increasing only "sluggishly" at 1.5% per year.
