= Saurabh Garg =

Secretary to Ministry of Statistics of India

Saurabh Garg IAS
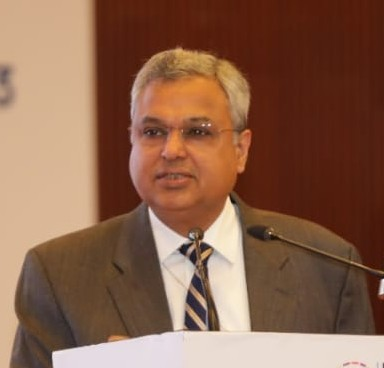

Secretary of Ministry of Statistics and Program Implementation of India
- Incumbent
- Assumed office 16 April 2024
- Preceded by: G.P Samanta

Secretary of Ministry of Social Justice and Empowerment
- In office 21 April 2023 – 11 June 2024
- Preceded by: Anjali Bhawra
- Succeeded by: Amit Yadav

Chief Executive Officer of Unique Identification Authority of India
- In office 5 April 2021 – 21 April 2023
- Preceded by: Pankaj Kumar
- Succeeded by: Amit Agrawal

Personal details
- Born: 28 July 1964 (age 62) New Delhi, India
- Education: (B.Tech) IIT Delhi; (MBA) IIM Ahmedabad; (PhD) Johns Hopkins University
- Occupation: Civil Servant, IAS officer

Saurabh Garg (born 28 July 1964) is a 1991-batch Indian Administrative Service officer of Odisha cadre and currently serves as the Secretary of Ministry of Statistics and Programme Implementation of India. He previously served as Secretary of Social Justice and Empowerment Ministry of India and also as CEO of Unique Identification Authority of India.

== Early life and education ==
Saurabh Garg was born on 28 July 1964 in New Delhi. He studied in St. Columba's School, New Delhi and graduated with a degree in B.Tech. in chemical engineering from IIT, Delhi. He earned a M.B.A. from IIM Ahmedabad where he was awarded a gold medal for academic excellence. He holds a PhD in international economics and development from Johns Hopkins University. He was Gurukul Chevening Scholar at the London School of Economics and Political Science.

== Career ==
Garg began his Indian Administrative Service career in the Odisha cadre. He has served in various positions for both the Government of India and the Government of Odisha.

=== Government of Odisha ===
In the Govt. of Odisha, as principal secretary, agriculture and farmers empowerment he led the development of a direct income transfer scheme for farmers and an agricultural policy focusing on the use of technology. He also served as chairman and managing director, Grid Corporation and Odisha Power Transmission Corporation.

As commissioner-cum-secretary, housing and urban development, he spearheaded the development of the Odisha Urban Infrastructure Development Fund (OUIDF). He also served as commissioner-cum-secretary, in the Department of Public Enterprises where he worked to increase accountability and improving governance of state-owned enterprises.

As commissioner-cum-secretary, Department of Industries in Odisha Government, his responsibilities were for improving the business investment climate and to strengthen the industrial infrastructure. As MD of the IDCOL Cement, Garg helped in making the state owned 1-million-ton cement company a market leader in the State of Odisha.

At the field level, he has worked in implementing all development and social security program of the government in the districts of Kalahandi, Bargarh and Keonjhar.

=== Government of India ===
Garg served as joint secretary in the Department of Economic Affairs, where he led the development of the National Investment and Infrastructure Fund (NIIF) and worked on preparing the framework for digital payments, revamping of the gold sector policies and instruments. He also led India in negotiations for the bilateral investment treaty with USA, Russia, Canada, Australia and RCEP countries; and in negotiations regarding GEF and IDA (World Bank) Replenishments. Earlier as director and deputy secretary in the Department of Economic Affairs, he worked in the capital markets division and also the G20 Secretariat and Multilateral Institutions Division.

In the Department of Expenditure, Government of India as joint secretary, he worked on the formulation of the Direct Benefits Transfer scheme and appraisal of the Central Government schemes for the 12th Five Year Plan.

In 2021, Garg was appointed as the chief executive officer of the Unique Identification Authority of India (UIDAI). As CEO of UIDAI, he enabled wider use of Aadhaar among all GoI entities for formulation of schemes, reduced cost of using Aadhaar services, simplified Aadhaar use in future programmes by widening consent mechanism and piloted use of contactless face authentication.

Later as secretary, Ministry of Social Justice and Empowerment, Government of India, Garg was involved in the formulation of policies for social, economic and educational empowerment of the vulnerable and marginalized communities.

Garg has served as a member of expert committees / working groups set up by the Ministry of Finance, NITI Aayog, RBI, and SEBI on ' Social Stock Exchanges'; 'Integration of Commodity Spot and Derivatives Markets'; 'Promotion of Digital Payments'; 'Transforming India's Gold market'; and 'Framework regarding Virtual/Crypto Currencies. He has been a chairman, managing director, or board member of public sector companies working in the areas of banking, export credit, development financing, financial inclusion, power sector, mining and security printing, both at the State and Central level.

Saurabh Garg is presently serving as secretary, Ministry of Statistics and Programme Implementation, where the focus is on strengthening and reforming the national statistical system.

=== International organizations and private sector ===
Garg served as advisor to the executive director, World Bank where he assisted in the discharge of the board's oversight responsibilities through in-depth examination of World Bank policies and practices.

As a member of the Tata Administrative Service, he worked in the Tata Strategic Management Group, where he was associated with the preparation of the 'Strategic Plan of the 90s' of the Tata Group.

== Awards ==
- Gurukul Chevening Scholarship for Young Leaders by the British Council for study at London School of Economics (LSE).
- Awarded Gold Medal for the Best All Round Trainee at Lal Bahadur Shastri National Academy of Administration (LBSNAA), Mussoorie
- Gold Medal for Academic Excellence in the Masters Program at Indian Institute of Management, Ahmedabad.
- Industry Scholarship for 2 years for the Masters program at Indian Institute of Management, Ahmedabad.
- Awarded Atul Kumar Memorial Prize for the Best All Round student in Chemical Engineering at Indian Institute of Technology, Delhi.

== Publications ==
Saurabh Garg has contributed chapters in books and articles in journals on Innovations in Administration, Corporate Governance, Infrastructure Financing, Financial Inclusion, Investment Promotion and Urban Development.

1. Garg et al., (2016), The Indian Model Bilateral Investment Treaty: Continuity and Change in Kavaljit Singh and Burghard Ilge (eds) 'Rethinking Bilateral Investment Treaties: Critical Issues and Policy Choices' published by Both ENDS, Madhyam and SOMO.
2. Garg, Saurabh (1998), "Resettlement in the Upper Indravati Project: A case study" in Hari Mohan Mathur and David Marsden (eds), "Development Projects and Impoverishment Risks: Resettling Project- Affected People in India". Oxford University Press, New Delhi.
3. Garg, Saurabh (2010), "Indian Infrastructure Vision: Financing Challenges: RITES Journal.
4. Garg, Saurabh (2000), "Some Interventions and Experiences in Improving Quality through Government Delivery Systems" in M. Raghavachari and K.V. Ramani (eds), "Delivering Service Quality – Managerial Challenges for the 21st Century". Macmillan, New Delhi.
5. Garg, Saurabh (2012), "Urban Development and Sustainable Living", RITES Journal.
6. Garg, Saurabh (1997). "Innovations in Administration – Development Initiatives in Forging Partnerships with Amorphous Groups at village level – The Kalahandi Experience" prepared for the 'International Conference on Creativity and Innovation at Grassroots for Sustainable Natural Resource Management'. Ahmedabad, India.
7. Garg, Saurabh (2000). "Corporate Governance in the Era of Globalisation", Indian Management, Vol.39, No.1, September, 2000.
8. Garg, Saurabh (1992). "Issues in Non-Farm Sector Development", The Administrator, Vol. XXXVII, Jan- Mar., 1992. Used as Course material for the students of the Post Graduate Program in Rural Management in the course on "Rural Resources, Production Systems and Livelihoods" at the Institute of Rural Management, Anand, Gujarat.
9. Garg et al., (2022), "Odisha Millet Mission: A transformative food system for mainstreaming sustainable diets" in "Routledge Handbook of Sustainable Diets", edited by Kathleen Kevany, Paolo Prosperi.
10. 'Caring For the Elders: From Family to State' - Hindustan Times, November 9, 2023
11. 'Catalysing Social Change' - Millenium Post, September 21, 2023
12. 'Going Digital has played a special Role as a catalyst in our economy' – Mint, March 27, 2023
13. 'Stack Up, There's Appetite' – Economic Times, February 14, 2023
14. "The next phase of IIA reforms," Columbia FDI Perspectives on Topical Foreign Direct Investment Issues No. 200 May 22, 2017.
