= Bimal Kumar Roy =

Indian cryptologist, former director of the Indian Statistical Institute

Bimal Kumar Roy is a former director of the Indian Statistical Institute. He is a cryptologist from the Cryptology Research Group of the Applied Statistics Unit of ISI, Kolkata. He received a Ph.D. in Combinatorics and Optimization in 1982 from the University of Waterloo under the joint supervision of Ronald C. Mullin and Paul Jacob Schellenberg.

In June 2015 Roy was removed from his post of director of ISI, just one month before the end of his appointment. This action was harshly criticised by the international academic community.

Currently, he is working on Combinatorics, and application of Statistics in Cryptology and Design of Experiments. In 2015, Roy was awarded Padma Shri, India's fourth-highest civilian honour, recognizing his accomplishments and contribution to education. In 2019, Roy was appointed as the chairperson of the National Statistical Commission, Ministry of Statistics and Programme Implementation, Government of India.

== See also ==
- List of University of Waterloo people
