= National Statistical Commission =

Indian governmental body

- राष्ट्रीय सांख्यिकी आयोग

Autonomous Body overview
- Formed: 12 July 2006 (decided on 01.06.2005
- Headquarters: New Delhi
- Autonomous Body executive: Saibal Chattopadhyay, (Chair)
- Parent department: Ministry of Statistics and Programme Implementation
- Website: www.mospi.nic.in

The National Statistical Commission (NSC) of India is an autonomous body which formed on 12 July 2006 under the recommendation of Rangarajan commission. The NSC is currently headed by Saibal Chattopadhyay who was appointed as Chairperson of the Commission on 18 June 2026 for a period of three years. Prof Shubhabrata Das, Satyendra Bahadur Singh and Dr Madhavan Mukund are other members of the Commission. Anurag Jain, ex. CEO of NITI Aayog is the ex officio Member, and Dr Saurabh Garg is Secretary to the Commission. The Chairperson of the Commission enjoys the status of a Minister of State, and the Members of the Commission have the status equivalent to the Secretary to the Government of India. The Chairperson and the Members also enjoy a relative security of tenure as once they assume office, they can be removed only by the President after the Supreme Court of India has on inquiry held in accordance with the procedure Article 145 of the Constitution of India reported that they ought to be removed.

The objective of its constitution is to reduce the problems faced by statistical agencies in the country in relation to collection of data.

Statistical agencies like the Central Statistics Office (CSO) and the National Sample Survey Organisation (NSSO) face numerous problems in collecting data from State and Central government departments, but an autonomous body like the NSC is thought to be more able to coordinate things as a statutory status would lend it teeth.

It would lay special emphasis on ensuring collection of unbiased data so as to restore public trust in the figures released by the Government.

== Present Composition ==
Present Members of the NSC (As on 18-06-2026):

National Statistical Commission
Position	Name of the Member
Chairman	Saibal Chattopadhyay
Member	Prof. Shubhabrata Das
Member	Satyendra Bahadur Singh
Member	Dr.Madhavan Mukund
Ex-Officio Member	Anurag Jain (Ex-Officio Member(CEO Niti Aayog)
Secretary to the NSC	Dr. Saurabh Garg(IAS)

== Chief Statistician of India ==
1. Pronab Sen – First Chief Statistician of India
2. T C A Anant
3. Pravin Srivastava
4. Dr.G.P.Samanta
5. Saurabh Garg (additional charge)
