= 1971 census of India =

- 10 to 31 March 1971

General information
- Country: India

Results
- Total population: 547,949,809 (24.84%)
- Most populous region: Uttar Pradesh (88,340,000)

The 1971 census of India was the 11th in a series of censuses held in India every decade since 1871.

The population of India was counted as 547,949,809 people.

== Population by state ==
Population of Indian states and union territories in 1971
State/Union Territory	Population
Andhra Pradesh	43,500,000
Assam (Note: includes Mizo district now part of Mizoram)	14,900,000
Bihar	56,300,000
Gujarat	26,600,000
Haryana	10,030,000
Himachal Pradesh	3,460,000
Jammu and Kashmir	4,610,000
Kerala	21,300,000
Madhya Pradesh	41,640,000
Maharashtra	50,400,000
Manipur	1,070,000
Mysore (Note: Mysore state was renamed Karnataka on November 1, 1973)	29,290,000
Nagaland	516,449
Orissa	21,940,000
Punjab	13,510,000
Rajasthan	25,700,000
Tamil Nadu	41,190,000
Tripura	1,550,000
Uttar Pradesh	88,340,000
West Bengal	44,310,000
Andaman and Nicobar Islands	115,133
Arunachal Pradesh	465, 511
Chandigarh	257,251
Dadra and Nagar Haveli	74,170
Delhi	4,060,000
Goa, Daman and Diu	857,771
Lakshadweep	31,810
Pondicherry	471,707

== Information ==
The schedule contained 35 questions.

Name of the person Relationship to head (of the household); Sex; Age; Marital Status; For currently married women only: Age at marriage; Any child born in the last one year; Birth Place: Place of birth; Rural/Urban; District; State/Country	Last Residence: Place of last residence; Rural/Urban; District; State/Country; Duration of Residence at the village or town of enumeration Religion; S.C. or S.T. Literacy (L or O); Educational level Mother tongue Other languages	Main Activity: Broad category; Worker (C, AL, HHI, OW); Non-worker (H, S, T, R, D, B, I, O); Place of work (Name of Village/Town); Name of Establishment; Nature of Industry, Trade, Profession or Service; Description of Work; Class of worker; Secondary Work: Broad Category (C, AL, HHI, OW); Place of work (Name of Village/Town); Name of Establishment; Nature of Industry, Trade, Profession or Service; Description of Work; Class of Worker

== See also ==
- Demographics of India
