= Indian Computing Olympiad =

The Indian Computing Olympiad is an annual competitive programming competition that selects four participants to represent India at the International Olympiad in Informatics. It is conducted by the Indian Association for Research in Computing Science.

== Rounds of competition ==
The first round of the competition is the Zonal Informatics Olympiad (ZIO), which is a computer-based test with integer-type answers. Students are expected to solve four problems in 3 hours. Alternatively, students can attempt the Zonal Computing Olympiad (ZCO).

The second round of the competition is the Indian National Olympiad in Informatics (INOI), a competitive programming competition. Students are expected to solve two algorithmic problems in 3 hours in C++. Questions in this round are similar to those in the International Olympiad in Informatics (IOI). Based on the results of the second round, students area awarded Gold, Silver and Bronze medals.

The third round of the competition is the International Olympiad in Informatics Training Camp (IOITC), at which students are trained for IOI. The training camp is generally hosted at the Chennai Mathematical Institute (CMI). Finally, based on their performance at the camp, a team of four is selected to represent India at the IOI.

== College admissions ==
The students selected for the IOITC receive several incentives for admission to undergraduate institutions in both India and abroad. A list of some of the incentives in India is as follows:

- Several IITs (Incl. IIT Madras, IIT Kanpur and IIT KGP) offer admission to BTech CSE and other programs.
- CMI Chennai offers direct admission to BS Math and CS.
- IIIT Hyderabad offers admission to students selected for IOITC.
