= Brij Kothari =

Indian social entrepreneur

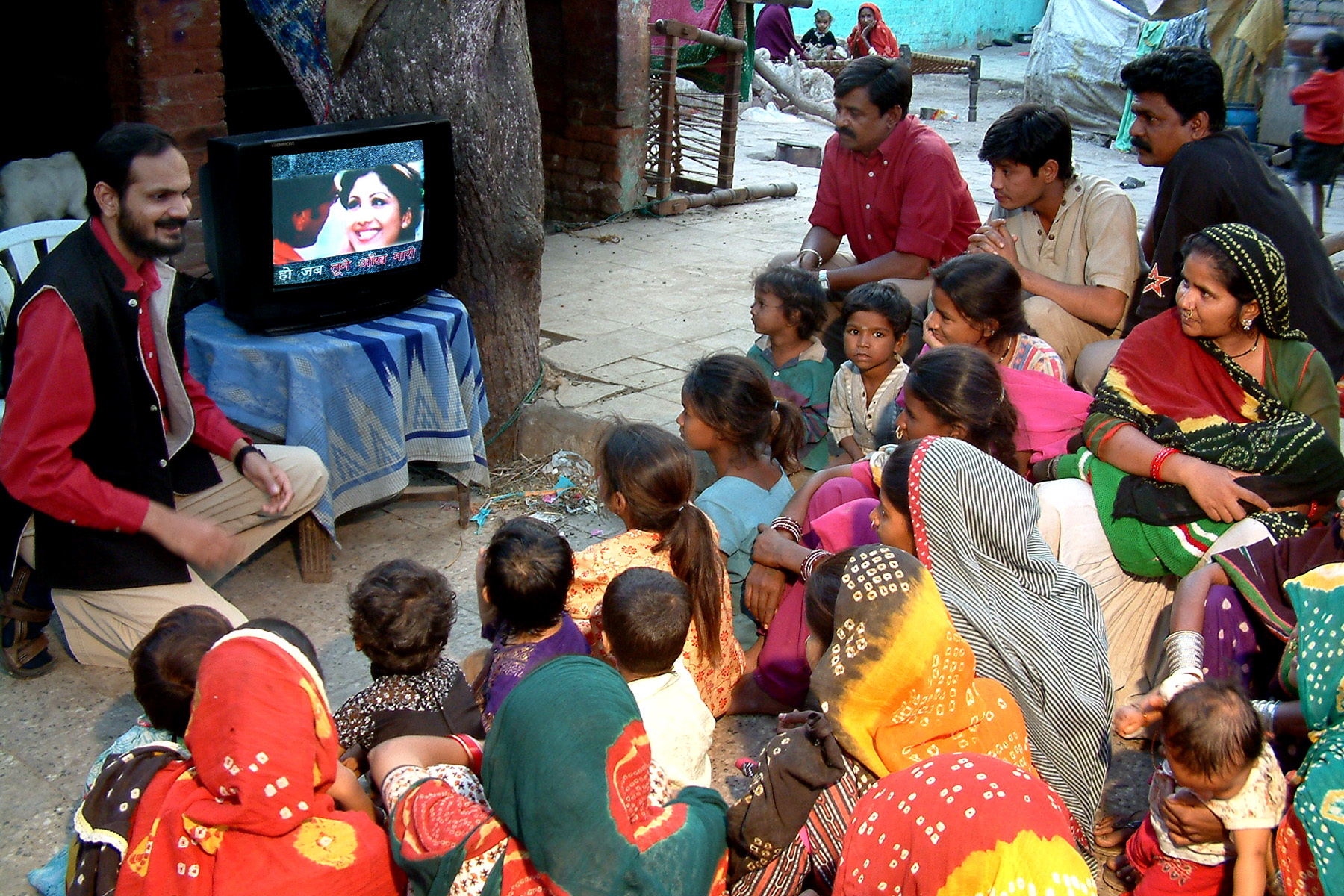
- Brij Kothari (left) speaks to a group of children
- Born: 9 June 1964 (age 62); Nanded, India
- Education: IIT Kanpur and Cornell
- Occupations: Academic and Social Entrepreneur

Brij Kothari (born 9 June 1964) is an Indian academic and a social entrepreneur. He invented Same Language Subtitling on TV for mass literacy in India.

== Early life ==
Brij Kothari was born to a business entrepreneur. His parents were particular about education and sent him to Sri Aurobindo International Centre of Education (SAICE) in Pondicherry. He is an alumnus of IIT Kanpur, and did his PhD from Cornell University. He is a Schwab Social Entrepreneur and an Ashoka Fellow. He was a fellow at Stanford University's Reuters Digital Vision Program and completed the "Leadership for System Change: Delivering Social Impact at Scale" program at Harvard University.

== Career ==
After completion of his academic pursuits Kothari returned to India. In 1996 he joined the faculty of the Indian Institute of Management in Ahmedabad. While continuing to teach communication to MBA students, he started work on SLS at IIM. He has been on the Faculty of IIM Ahmedabad, as associate and adjunct professor, since 1996.

=== Same-language subtitling ===
In 1999, in an effort to improve functional literacy rates in India, he experimented with subtitles on Chitrageet, a Gujarati television program. In 2002, the Doordarshan network subtitled their national program Chitrahaar. Since 2006, SLS has been implemented on one weekly program each in Hindi, Bengali, Gujarati, Punjabi, Kannada, Telugu, Tamil, and Marathi. The main goal is to persuade broadcasting policy in India to implement SLS on all songs on TV, in all languages.

Kothari is the president of PlanetRead, a non-profit involved in furthering Same Language Subtitling throughout the world. He is also the founder of BookBox, a social venture funded by First Light Ventures that produces animated, read-along stories for children in languages such as English, Spanish, Mandarin, Hindi, and over 21 others.

His work was also selected by the Google.org as one of the projects for funding.

== Personal life ==
Kothari is married. He has two sons and a daughter.

== Awards ==
Year	Title
2017	iF Social Impact Prize
2013	Library of Congress, International Literacy Prize
2012	USAID, Winner, All Children Reading Grand Challenge
2011	NASSCOM, Social Innovation Honour
2009	Indian Social Entrepreneur of the Year, Schwab Foundation and UNDP
2009 2011	Clinton Global Initiative, Feature
2004	Ashoka Fellow
2003	Tech Laureate (Education), The Tech Awards
2002	Winner, Development Marketplace, Global innovation competition – World Bank
