= Dheeraj Kumar =

Indian actor and producer (1944–2025)

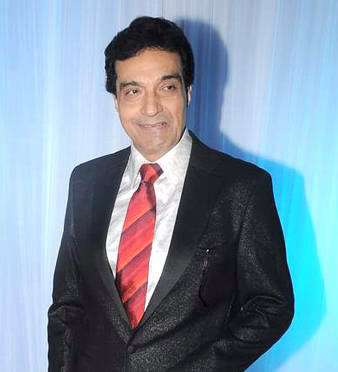
- Kumar in 2012
- Born: Dheeraj Kochar; 1 October 1944
- Died: 15 July 2025 (aged 80); Mumbai, Maharashtra, India
- Occupations: Actor; film director; film producer
- Years active: 1970–2020

Dheeraj Kochar (1 October 1944 – 15 July 2025), professionally known as Dheeraj Kumar, was an Indian actor, television producer and director. He started Creative Eye Limited, a television production house in 1986. He acted in both Bollywood and Punjabi films, including Sargam (1979), Roti Kapada Aur Makaan (1974) and Beharoopia (1971).

== Life and career ==
Kumar was born on 1 October 1944. In 1965, Kumar was one of the finalists in a talent show organized by the United Producers and Filmfare. The other finalists included Subhash Ghai and Rajesh Khanna, Rajesh Khanna was the eventual winner. This helped him launch himself in movies, while simultaneously acting as a model in advertisements including those for Vicks Action 500.

He acted in 21 Punjabi films from 1970 to 1984. He started a production company, Creative Eye and was its chairman and managing director. In the film Swami (1977), the song "Ka Karoon Sajani, Aaye Na Balam" was picturised on him. He also worked in other films like Heera Panna, Raaton Ka Raja (where he was the leading man), Shreeman Shrimati, etc.

Kumar died from acute pneumonia at a hospital in Mumbai, on 15 July 2025, at the age of 80.

== Filmography ==
- Deedar (1970)
- Raaton Ka Raja (1971)
- Baharon Phool Barsao (1972)
- Bijali (1972)
- Heera Panna (1973)
- Sharafat Chod Di Maine (1973)
- Roti Kapda Aur Makan (1975)
- Ranga Khush (1975)
- Angaaray (1976)
- Daaj (1976)
- Fauji (1976) (Punjabi film)
- Udhar ka Sindur (1976)
- Sher Puttar (1977) Punjabi movie
- Swami (1977)
- Shirdi Ke Sai Baba (1977)
- Sargam
- Sehti Murad (1979) (Punjabi film)
- Choran Noo Mor (1980) (Punjabi film)
- Maang Bharo Sajana (1980)
- Kranti (1981)
- Pyaas (1982)
- Paanchwin Manzil (1983)
- Hamar Bhauji (1983)
- Purana Mandir (1984)
- Bepanaah (1985) as Sheshnag
- Karm Yudh (1985) as Kundan

=== Television ===
==== Director/Producer ====
- Kahan Gaye Woh Log (1986) (Director)
- Adalat (1986)
- Sansaar (1993)
- Om Namah Shivay (1997)
- Dhoop Chhaon (1999)
- Jap Tap Vratt (2000)
- Shree Ganesh (2000) Channel: Sony
- Sach (2001)
- Jaane Anjaane (2001)
- Paowan (2004) Channel: Hungama TV
- Kya Muhjse Dosti Karoge (2004) Channel: Hungama TV
- Hey...Yehii To Haii Woh! (2004) Channel: Star One
- Om Namo Narayan (2004) Channel: Sahara One
- Bandham
- Ruby Duby Hub Dub (2005) Channel: Sahara One
- Miilee (2006) Channel: Star Plus
- Jodee Kamal Ki (2006) Channel: Star Plus
- Ghar Ki Lakshmi Betiyann (2006) Channel: Zee TV
- Man Mein Hai Visshwas (2006) Channel: Sony
- Hamari Bhau Tulsi (2007) Channel
- Maayka (2007) Channel: Zee TV
- Waqt Batayega Kaun Apna Kaun Paraya (2008) Channel: Sony
- Jai Ma Vaishanvdevi (2008) Channel: 9x
- Ganesh Leela (2009) Channel: Sahara One
- Yeh Pyar Na Hoga Kam (2009) Channel: Colors
- Rishton Ke Bhanwar Mein Uljhi Niyati (2011) Channel: Sahara One
- Babosa (2011) Channel: Sony
- Sawaare Sabke Sapne Preeto (2011) Channel: Imagine TV
- Neem Neem Shahad Shahad (2011) Channel: Sahara One
- Tujh Sang Preet Lagai Sajna (2012) Channel: Sahara One
- Safar Filmy Comedy Ka. (2013) Channel: Sony Sab
- Nadaniyaan (2013) Channel: Big Magic
- Singhasan Battisi (2014) Channel: Sony Pal
- Betaal aur Singhasan Battisi (2015) Channel: Sony Sab
- Y.A.R.O Ka Tashan (2016) Channel: Sony Sab
- Ishq Subhan Allah (2018) Channel: Zee TV

=== Web series ===
- Ishq Aaj Kal (2019)

== Television ==
Year	Serial	Role	Channel
2003	Ghar Sansaar	Amar	DD National
