= Rangoli (TV series) =

Indian music television

- Genre: Music
- Country of origin: India
- Original language: Hindi

Production
- Running time: 60 minutes (with commercials)
- Production companies: Doordarshan; Creative Eye Limited

Original release
- Network: DD National
- Release: 1988 – present

Rangoli is an Indian music television series which airs on DD National every Sunday morning. The word literally means a decoration of colors. The show is produced by Doordarshan. A few seasons were also produced by Creative Eye Limited. Same language subtitling is used in the show to improve literacy in rural areas.

== History ==
Rangoli first aired in 1988 and was widely watched in the 1990s. It was popular even outside India, especially in places like the Middle East or the United States, which had a large number of people of Indian origin.

In 1997, both Chitrahaar and Rangoli went back to private producers, with Chitrahaar going to Amit Khanna of Plus Channel and Rangoli to Dheeraj Kumar of Creative Eye.

In 2014, it became the highest rated programme with the highest TVM - 4, during the 8.00 am to 9.00 am slot on Sunday creating a record.

During its first few seasons, the show was hosted by Bollywood actress Hema Malini. The show was also hosted by television actress Shweta Tiwari, Prachi Shah and Neetu Chandra. In July 2019, the show was hosted by Surveen Chawla. Since August 2019, Madhoo is hosting the show.

== Hosts ==
- Hema Malini
- Sharmila Tagore
- Mayuri Kango
- Inder Kumar
- Prachi Shah
- Jaya Bhattacharya
- Shweta Tiwari
- Sara Khan
- Swara Bhaskar
- Neetu Chandra
- Surveen Chawla
- Hrishitaa Bhatt
- Madhoo

== See also ==
- List of programs broadcast by DD National
