= ITA Award for Best Actress in a Negative Role =

Indian Television Academy award

- Awarded for: Best Performance by a female actor in a Negative Role on Television
- Country: India
- First award: Sudha Chandran for Prratima (2005)
- Currently held by: Shagun Sharma for Kyunki Saas Bhi Kabhi Bahu Thi 2 (2025)
- Website: Indian Television Academy Awards

ITA Award for Best Actress in a Negative Role is an award given by Indian Television Academy Awards for TV serials, to recognize a female actor who has delivered an outstanding performance in a negative role, that is in the role of an antagonist.

== Superlative ==
Surekha Sikri has won the award three times, highest for anyone and two consecutive awards for years 2008 and 2009. Sikri is also the oldest winner, winning her third award in this category at the age of 71. Helly Shah is the youngest winner, she won at the age of 23.

== Winners ==
Year	Actor	Character	Show	Ref
2005	Sudha Chandran	Alakalata Roy	Prratima	
2006	Achint Kaur	Pallavi Bhandari	Kahaani Ghar Ghar Kii	
2007	Ashwini Kalsekar	Jigyasa Walia	Kasamh Se	
2008	Surekha Sikri	Kalyani Devi	Balika Vadhu	
2009	Surekha Sikri	Kalyani Devi	Balika Vadhu	
2010	Meghna Malik	Ammaji	Na Aana Is Des Laado	
2011	Mona Ambegaonkar	Roshni	Maryada: Lekin Kab Tak?	
2012	Hema Singh	Imarti Devi	Kairee — Rishta Khatta Meetha	
2013	Aashka Goradia	Dheer Bai Bhatiyani	Bharat Ka Veer Putra – Maharana Pratap	
2014	Simone Singh	Sakshi Goenka	Ek Hasina Thi	
2015	Anita Hassanandani	Shagun Arora	Yeh Hai Mohabbatein	
2016	Surekha Sikri	Bhagyavanti Devi	Ek Tha Raja Ek Thi Rani	
2017	Kamya Panjabi	Preeto Singh	Shakti - Astitva Ke Ehsaas Ki	
2018	Shipsy Rana	Rukhsar Sheikh	Ishq Subhan Allah	
2019	Helly Shah	Kaynat Shah	Sufiyana Pyaar Mera	
2020	Not awarded			
2021	Priya Tandon	Amba	Vidrohi	
2022	Kishori Shahane	Bhavani Nagesh Chavan	Ghum Hai Kisikey Pyaar Meiin	
2023	Gauri Tonk	Jasleen "Jassi" Kaur Brar	Teri Meri Doriyaann	
2024	Kamya Punjabi	Didun	Neerja - Ek Nayi Pehchaan	
2025	Shagun Sharma	Paridhii "Pari" Virani	Kyunki Saas Bhi Kabhi Bahu Thi 2	
