= Creative Eye Limited =

Indian media and entertainment company

- Type: Public
- Traded as: BSE: 532392; NSE: CREATIVEYE
- Industry: Media conglomerate
- Headquarters: Mumbai, India
- Key people: Dheeraj Kumar (MD); Zuby Kochhar (Executive Director)
- Products: Films, Television, Satellite Television, Games, Websites Broadcasting, Media, Entertainment
- Website: www.creativeeye.com

Creative Eye Limited is an Indian Media conglomerate integrated media and entertainment company. The company was launched in a private sector in 1986, but became a public limited company in 1996. The company is listed under Bombay Stock Exchange, National Stock Exchange of India, Bloomberg L.P., and also on Reuters Group.

== Television ==
Creative Eye started off producing television content for Indian public broadcaster Doordarshan network in 1986. Following is a list of television programmes produced by CREATIVEYE:

Year	Title	Channel	Notes
1986	Kahan Gaye Woh Log	DD National	
1986–1987	Adalat	DD National	
1987	Aage Aage Dekho Hota Hai Kya	DD National	
1993	Sansar	DD National	
1995	Rangoli	DD National	
1995	Chitrahaar	DD National	
1997	Om Namah Shivay	DD National	
1999	Dhoop Chhaon	DD National	
2000	Jap Tap Vratt	DD National	
2000	Shree Ganesh	Sony TV	
2001	Sach	DD National	
2001	Jaane Anjaane	DD National	
2002	Ghar Sansar	DD National	Remake of Kavyanjali
2004	Poawan	Hungama TV	
2004	Kya Mujhse Dosti Karoge	Hungama TV	
2004–2005	Hey...Yehii To Haii Woh!	Star One	
2005	Om Namo Narayan	Sahara One	
2005	Ruby Duby Hub Dub	Sahara One	
2005–2006	Miilee	Star Plus	
2006–2007	Jodee Kamaal Ki	Star Plus	
2006–2009	Ghar Ki Lakshmi Betiyann	Zee TV	
2006	Man Mein Hai Visshwas	Sony TV	
2007	Hamari Bhau Tulsi	DD National	
2007	Naqaab	DD National	
2007–2009	Maayka	Zee TV	
2008	Veeranwali	9X	
2008	Waqt Batayega Kaun Apna Kaun Paraya	Sony TV	
2008	Jai Maa Vaishnavi	9X	
2009	Ganesh Leela	Sahara One	
2009–2010	Yeh Pyar Na Hoga Kam	Colors TV	
2011–2012	Sawaare Sabke Sapne Preeto	Imagine TV	
2011–2014	Rishton Ke Bhanwar Mein Uljhi Niyati	Sahara One	
2011	Neem Neem Shahad Shahad	Sahara One	
2012–2013	Tujh Sang Preet Lagai Sajna	Sahara One	
2013	Safar Filmy Comedy Ka	SAB TV	
2013–2017	Nadaniyaan	BIG MAGIC	
2014–2015	Singhasan Battisi	Sony Pal	
2015	Betaal Aur Singhasan Battisi	SAB TV	
2016–2017	Y.A.R.O Ka Tashan	SAB TV	
2018–2019	Shri Vishnu – Dashavathara	Zee Kannada & Zee Tamil	
2018–2020	Ishq Subhan Allah	Zee TV	
2021	Nikki Aur Jadui Babbal	Dangal TV	
