= Ishq Aaj Kal =

Indian web series

- Genre: Romance; Thriller
- Written by: Niraj Kumar Mishra; Heena Kohli Khan; Pankhuri Gangwal (Jain); Arshad Jaffrey; Salil Sand
- Directed by: Nitesh Singh
- Starring: Ankitta Sharma; Angad Hasija; Paras Kalnawat
- Country of origin: India
- Original languages: Hindi; Urdu
- No. of seasons: 4
- No. of episodes: 32 (list of episodes)

Production
- Producers: Dheeraj Kumar; Zuby Kochhar; Sunil Gupta
- Production location: India
- Running time: Approx. 24 minutes
- Production company: Creative Eye Limited

Original release
- Network: ZEE5
- Release: 4 July – 30 October 2019

Ishq Aaj Kal is an Indian web series featured on ZEE5. The show is produced by Dheeraj Kumar, Zuby Kochhar, Sunil Gupta and directed by Nitesh Singh. It stars Angad Hasija, Ankitta Sharma, and Paras Kalnawat in lead roles. This show is a spin-off version of Ishq Subhan Allah.

The story revolves around Alia Jaffri whose dark past continues to ruin her present life and impacts her relationships. Right after the success of Season 1, Ishq Aaj Kal was renewed at Zee5 for second, third and fourth seasons.

== Premise ==
The story focuses around 24-year-old Alia Jaffri who is on a mission to find her father and discover the truth about her mother's murder.

== Synopsis ==
Alia Jaffri is interning at a hotel where her team is led by Arshad Ali Khan. Within the team, Faraz Sheikh seems to show an interest in Alia but she dislikes him.

However, Alia's dark past brings her, Faraz and Arshad to a crossroads.

== Cast ==
- Ankitta Sharma as Alia Jaffri: Amaira's half-sister; Kabir's cousin; Arshad and Ejaz's love-interest
- Angad Hasija as Arshad Ali Khan: Ejaz and Amaira's cousin; Naaz's nephew; Alia's former love-interest (Season 1-3)
- Paras Kalnawat as Faraz Sheikh: Amaira's boyfriend; Alia's one-sided obsessive lover
- Puneett Chouksey as Ejaz Ali Khan: Arshad's cousin; Alia's love-interest (Season 3-4)
- Roshmi Banik as Munmun Sengupta: Alia, Faraz and Amaira's fellow intern
- Kavita Ghai as Naaz Khan: Arshad and Ejaz's aunt; Amaira's mother
- Shagun Jaiswal as Amaira Khan Jaafri: Alia's half-sister; Naaz's daughter; Faraz's girlfriend
- Rushil Bangia was added to the cast for Season 3

== Episodes ==
Series	Episodes	Originally released
1	8	4 July 2019
2	8	2 August 2019
3	8	6 September 2019
4	8	30 October 2019

=== Season 1 ===
No. overall	No. in season	Title	Directed by	Written by	Original release date
1	1	"The Grand Mountain Resort"	Nitesh Singh	Niraj Kumar Mishra and Heena Kohli Khan	4 July 2019
2	2	"Kiss and tale"	Nitesh Singh	Niraj Kumar Mishra and Heena Kohli Khan	4 July 2019
3	3	"Friends forever?"	Nitesh Singh	Niraj Kumar Mishra and Heena Kohli Khan	4 July 2019
4	4	"V for Vendetta"	Nitesh Singh	Niraj Kumar Mishra and Heena Kohli Khan	4 July 2019
5	5	"No child's play"	Nitesh Singh	Niraj Kumar Mishra and Heena Kohli Khan	4 July 2019
6	6	"All's fair in love and war"	Nitesh Singh	Niraj Kumar Mishra and Heena Kohli Khan	4 July 2019
7	7	"The fallout"	Nitesh Singh	Niraj Kumar Mishra and Heena Kohli Khan	4 July 2019
8	8	"A moment of truth"	Nitesh Singh	Niraj Kumar Mishra and Heena Kohli Khan	4 July 2019

=== Season 2 ===
No. overall	No. in season	Title	Directed by	Written by	Original release date
9	1	"Chasing dreams"	Nitesh Singh	Heena Kohli Khan and Pankhuri Gangwal (Jain)	2 August 2019
10	2	"The pain of losing a close one"	Nitesh Singh	Heena Kohli Khan and Pankhuri Gangwal (Jain)	2 August 2019
11	3	"The beginning"	Nitesh Singh	Heena Kohli Khan and Pankhuri Gangwal (Jain)	2 August 2019
12	4	"Alia's search for the truth"	Nitesh Singh	Heena Kohli Khan and Pankhuri Gangwal (Jain)	2 August 2019
13	5	"Connecting the dots"	Nitesh Singh	Heena Kohli Khan and Pankhuri Gangwal (Jain)	2 August 2019
14	6	"You are under surveillance"	Nitesh Singh	Heena Kohli Khan and Pankhuri Gangwal (Jain)	2 August 2019
15	7	"Fighting the blame game"	Nitesh Singh	Heena Kohli Khan and Pankhuri Gangwal (Jain)	2 August 2019
16	8	"A mixed bag"	Nitesh Singh	Heena Kohli Khan and Pankhuri Gangwal (Jain)	2 August 2019

=== Season 3 ===
No. overall	No. in season	Title	Directed by	Written by	Original release date
17	1	"Brave, Not Perfect"	Nitesh Singh	Pankhuri Gangwal (Jain) and Arshad Jaffrey	6 September 2019
18	2	"An Incomplete Victory"	Nitesh Singh	Pankhuri Gangwal (Jain) and Arshad Jaffrey	6 September 2019
19	3	"Tying up the Loose Ends"	Nitesh Singh	Pankhuri Gangwal (Jain) and Arshad Jaffrey	6 September 2019
20	4	"In Search of the Truth"	Nitesh Singh	Pankhuri Gangwal (Jain) and Arshad Jaffrey	6 September 2019
21	5	"The First Fight"	Nitesh Singh	Pankhuri Gangwal (Jain) and Arshad Jaffrey	6 September 2019
22	6	"The Hunter Becomes the Hunted"	Nitesh Singh	Pankhuri Gangwal (Jain) and Arshad Jaffrey	6 September 2019
23	7	"The Mystery Behind the Mask"	Nitesh Singh	Pankhuri Gangwal (Jain) and Arshad Jaffrey	6 September 2019
24	8	"The Final Face-off"	Nitesh Singh	Pankhuri Gangwal (Jain) and Arshad Jaffrey	6 September 2019

=== Season 4 ===
No. overall	No. in season	Title	Directed by	Written by	Original release date
25	1	"Dark Secrets"	Nitesh Singh	Arshad Jaffrey and Salil Sand	30 October 2019
26	2	"Set it Up"	Nitesh Singh	Arshad Jaffrey and Salil Sand	30 October 2019
27	3	"The Imposter"	Nitesh Singh	Arshad Jaffrey and Salil Sand	30 October 2019
28	4	"Flesh and Blood"	Nitesh Singh	Arshad Jaffrey and Salil Sand	30 October 2019
29	5	"In the League"	Nitesh Singh	Arshad Jaffrey and Salil Sand	30 October 2019
30	6	"Trust No One"	Nitesh Singh	Arshad Jaffrey and Salil Sand	30 October 2019
31	7	"Tell Me the Truth"	Nitesh Singh	Arshad Jaffrey and Salil Sand	30 October 2019
32	8	"Start from the Beginning"	Nitesh Singh	Arshad Jaffrey and Salil Sand	30 October 2019
