= Neem Neem Shahad Shahad =

Indian drama television series (2011-2012)

- Title card
- Genre: Drama
- Developed by: Amit Khan & Sandhya Riaz
- Written by: Deepak Pachori
- Directed by: Naresh Malhotra
- Creative director: Prakash Patel
- Starring: See below
- Theme music composer: Manoj Santoshi
- Opening theme: "Neem Neem Shahad Shahd" by Madhushree & Charu Semwal
- Country of origin: India
- Original language: Hindi
- No. of seasons: 1
- No. of episodes: 285

Production
- Executive producer: Amit Kumar
- Producers: Dheeraj Kumar & Zuby Kochhar
- Production location: Mumbai, Maharashtra
- Editors: Rochak Arora & Salestin Dsouza
- Camera setup: Multi-camera
- Running time: Approx. 24 minutes
- Production company: Creative Eye Limited

Original release
- Network: Sahara One
- Release: 10 January 2011 – 30 May 2012

Related
- Tujh Sang Preet Lagai Sajna

Neem Neem Shahad Shahad is an Indian Hindi language drama series, which premiered on 15 August 2011 on Sahara One. The series is produced by Dheeraj Kumar of Creative Eye Limited, and stars Amrapali Gupta & Anas Khan as lead actors. The series was followed by its second season with new name, Tujh Sang Preet Lagai Sajna, due to change its genre, which also aired on Sahara One.

== Plot ==
Neem Neem Shahad Shahad is the story of two sisters, Sonali and Nirali. They marry cousins and start living in the same house. Both sisters have diametrically opposed views on family life. While the traditional Sonali favours the joint family system, the modern Nirali wants a nuclear family. The conflicts caused by this and other factors lead to many changes in the lives of the sisters.

== Cast ==
- Amrapali Gupta as Sonali
- Khyati Mangla as Nirali
- Shakti Anand as Chirag
- Anas Khan as Deven
- Jaydeep Dabgar as Rohit
- Neena Cheema as Baa
- Surendra Pal as Hansmukh
- Vidya Sinha as Ranjan, Hansmukh's wife
- Deepak Parashar as Chiman
- Anita Kulkarni as Kokila
- Farida Dadi as Maasi ji
- Falguni Desai / Sanjivni Saathe as Usha, Narrottam 's wife
- Hitesh Dave as Bharat
- Vibhuti Trivedi as Kinjal, Hemal 's wife
- Mohit Daga as Hemal
- Amit Dua as Vikram: Sonali 's boyfriend; Kinjal's brother
- Vijay Badlani as Naren Kumar
