= Carter High School =

Carter High School may refer to a number of high schools:

- Carter High School (Strawberry Plains, Tennessee), in Knox County, Tennessee, United States
- Carter High School (South Africa), in Pietermaritzburg, KwaZulu-Natal, South Africa
- David W. Carter High School, in Dallas, Texas, United States
- Wilmer Amina Carter High School, in Rialto, California, United States
