= Tujh Sang Preet Lagai Sajna =

Tujh Sang Preet Lagai Sajna may refer to:

- Tujh Sang Preet Lagai Sajna (Star Plus), a drama series that aired on the Indian satellite television network Star Plus in 2008–2010.
- Tujh Sang Preet Lagai Sajna (Sahara One), an Indian television drama series aired on television channel Sahara One in 2012–2013.
