= Campus Beats =

Indian romantic drama television series

- Genre: Drama; Romance
- Created by: Palki Malhotra
- Written by: Palki Malhotra; Prakriti Mukherjee; Dialogues: Shweta Singh
- Screenplay by: Aakash Shewakaramani; Palki Malhotra
- Directed by: Aniruddha Rajderkar
- Starring: Shantanu Maheshwari; Shruti Sinha; Tanvi Gadkari; Sahaj Singh Chahal; Dhanshree Yadav; Tanya Bhushan; Teriya Magar; Harsh Dingwanii; Roop Durgapal; Chandan K Anand; Gulshan Nain; Paras Kalnawat
- Theme music composer: Shailesh Suvarna
- Country of origin: India
- Original language: Hindi
- No. of seasons: 7
- No. of episodes: 90

Production
- Producer: Deepak Dhar
- Cinematography: Indranil Singha
- Editors: Sandeep Singh Vinay Mandal, Karan Varia
- Camera setup: Multi-camera
- Running time: 22 minutes
- Production company: Banijay Asia

Original release
- Network: Amazon miniTV
- Release: 21 September 2023 – present

Campus Beats is an Indian Hindi-language romantic drama television series on Amazon miniTV. Produced by Deepak Dhar under Banijay Asia, it stars Shantanu Maheshwari, Shruti Sinha, Tanvi Gadkari, Sahaj Singh Chahal, Harsh Dingwanii, Dhanshree Yadav, Tanya Bhushan, Teriya Magar, Roop Durgapal, Gulshan Nain and Chandan K Anand.

== Cast ==
- Shantanu Maheshwari as Ishaan Mehrotra
- Shruti Sinha as Netra Lokhande aka Netra Kumari
- Tanvi Gadkari as Rihaana Oberoi
- Sahaj Singh Chahal as Neil Oberoi
- Harsh Dingwanii as Malang
- Dhanshree Yadav as Sam
- Rohan Pal as Figo
- Tanya Bhushan as Sulekha
- Teriya Magar as Kiran
- Adnan Khan as Amit
- Roop Durgapal as Piyali
- Manish poonam as moksh
- Dipankana das as pakhi
- Chandan K Anand as Inspector Shashank Shekhawat
- Gulshan Nain as Ravjeet
- Manini De as Tapasvi
- Paras Kalnawat as Sumer
- Sushant Divgikar as Taha(cameo appearance)

== Episodes ==
Series	Episodes	Originally released
1	10	21 September 2023
2	10	20 October 2023
3	10	5 December 2023
4	15	20 November 2024
5	15	10 April 2025
6	15	29 April 2026

== Production ==
The series was announced for Amazon miniTV. Shantanu Maheshwari, Shruti Sinha, Tanvi Gadkari, Sahaj Singh Chahal, Dhanshree Yadav, Tanya Bhushan, Teriya Magar and Harsh Dingwanii were approached to star in the series. The principal photography of the series commenced in 2023. The trailer of the series was released on 17 September 2023, 17 October 2023 and 5 December 2023.

== Soundtrack ==
Campus Beats

Soundtrack album
- Released: 2023
- Genre: Soundtrack
- Language: Hindi

Tracklisting
No.	Title	Length
1.	"City Slums"
2.	"Proper Patola"
