= Ishq Subhan Allah =

Indian television series

- Genre: Drama; Romance
- Created by: Danish Javed
- Developed by: Danish Javed
- Written by: Danish Javed
- Screenplay by: Danish Javed; Reshma khan; S Farhaan; Rahil Qazi
- Story by: Danish Javed; Reshma Khan; S Farhaan; Rahil Qazi
- Directed by: Vikram Ghai; Vidyadhar Mohite; Rohit Raj Goyal; Avinaash Sharrma; Arvind Gupta
- Creative director: Aashish Harbhagwan Batra
- Starring: Adnan Khan; Eisha Singh
- Theme music composer: Mukul Puri
- Opening theme: Ishq Subhan Allah
- Ending theme: Ishq Jaaniya
- Composer: Mukul Puri
- Country of origin: India
- Original languages: Hindi; Urdu
- No. of seasons: 1
- No. of episodes: 588

Production
- Executive producers: Asgar Ali Shaikh; Shailendra Toraskar; Rajan Singh; Ashwinn Singh
- Producers: Zuby Kochhar; Dheeraj Kumar; Sunil Gupta
- Production location: Mumbai, Maharashtra
- Cinematography: Dinesh Singh
- Editors: Dharmesh Patel; Kamal Bhattrai
- Camera setup: Multi-camera
- Running time: 22 minutes
- Production companies: Creative Eye Limited; Essel Vision Productions

Original release
- Network: Zee TV
- Release: 14 March 2018 – 2 October 2020

Related
- Ishq Aaj Kal

Ishq Subhan Allah (English: Love, praise be to God) is an Indian television series that premiered on 14 March 2018 on Zee TV. Produced by Dheeraj Kumar, it starred Eisha Singh and Adnan Khan. Set against a Muslim backdrop, it addressed contemporary political, religious and social issues including Triple talaq and Sharia law and aimed to dispel wrong notions about Islam. It replaced Woh Apna Sa in its slot that took over a time slot change. It has been replaced by Ram Pyaare Sirf Humare in its timeslot.

== Plot ==
The series begins with Zara Siddiqui and Kabir Ahmad returning to Lucknow after five years and completing higher studies in Islam. When an argument about Triple Talaq between Zara and Kabir becomes viral on the Internet, they are forced to marry each other.

Gradually after marriage, Zara realises her love for the still hesitant Kabir. Rukhsaar has been in love with him from a young age and tries to split them up, bringing Miraj to create differences between Zara and Kabir though he goes rogue out to harm everyone in the family.

Rukhsaar calls Nilofer to pose as Miraj's sister and instructs her to protect the family from Miraj except for Zara, but is then married off to Hamdan Alghazi and leaves for Dubai. Miraj buys out and kills Nilofer. A misunderstanding leads Kabir to divorce Zara using the Triple Talaq practice.

It is revealed this was not a part of their weddings, and Zara refuses to accept. Miraj tells Zara that he wants her and can go to any extent, whereas she tries to have Rukhsaar return to expose Miraj's true intentions but cannot reach her. Miraj makes his way into the local Shariah Board and turns out to be diamond-smuggler laundering money.

Miraj is arrested, and Kabir's dream project loses its funding. Miraj's connection to Rukhsaar is revealed before he swears revenge on Zara and Kabir, who confess their love. The family arranges their remarriage. Before it, Kabir leaves for Dubai to save Rukhsaar from implication in Hamdaan's death and ends up marrying her to save her. He weds Zara on his return. When Zara finds out, she is heartbroken but decides to stay.

Rukhsaar goes back to her evil scheming by feeding Zara false information about her and Kabir being intimate on their wedding night. Kabir then decides to divorce Rukhsaar, but cannot since Islam states that 'you cannot divorce your spouse without reason. Meanwhile, Rukhsaar shockingly agrees to sign the divorce papers, only on one condition. Kabir has to spend a night with her like he should've done on their nuptial night, which is part of her plan to separate Zara and Kabir by poisoning herself and Kabir. On Zara's orders, Kabir reluctantly agrees to Rukhsaar's condition. On their wedding night, Rukhsaar meets with an accident and loses her memory. Kabir takes responsibility for upsetting Zara. Wanting Kabir to earn independently, Zara moves to the outhouse. Tabassum visits with Azhar, who appreciates Zara's modern thinking. Shahbaz is in debt and decides to sell the house, but Kashan tricks him and takes ownership of the house.

Kabir realises Shahbaz's faults and sees Zara's well-intended suggestion to him to earn independently. Rukhsaar is sent to a hospital for treatment; Zeenat and Kashan team up to have Alina marry local don Salamat's son Samir. Zara and Kabir thwart their plan with the help of army officer Amir, who and Alina fall in love and marry. Salamat tries to kill Kabir and Zara. Kabir becomes the head priest.

Zeenat is irked; Salamat threatens to kill Rukhsaar, and Irfan suggests Zara become the vice priest. Heer's case is brought before the Sharia Board, where she wants to go to Delhi to study but in vain amid her reluctant father. Zara takes the case against Kabir and wins. Suraiya moves to Lucknow with Rizwan and plans to replace Kabir as Board Head with Zeenat's help. Salamat bribes Khalid at Zeenat's request.

Rizwan exposes Zeenat's actions as soon as he joins the Board and has her declared mentally unsound. She vows revenge on Rizwan, who starts poisoning Irfan slowly. Bilal and Kausar's case comes to the Board; Rizwan plans to create a rift between Zara and Kabir, who tells her that Kausar was betrothed to Kashan and eloped on the wedding before Kashan married Zeenat, who was indebted to Kausar's family.

Everyone in the family request Zara to disagree with the case, but she and Kabir decide. The entire city protests against them, and Kabir turns against Zara, who is about to drop the case before Kausar's suicide attempt changes her mind. Zara leaves Ahmads and Shahbaz plans her murder. In the Sharia Board, she wins. Rizwan orchestrates Kabir in an accident; a hitman hired by Shahbaz shoots Zara. The two collapse together.

=== One year later ===
Zara and Kabir live separately. While Zara resides with Amina, Azra, and Nusu in Mumbai, Kabir lives with his family in Lucknow. Zara and Kabir have applied for a divorce wanting to free each other, but he finds Zara's hospital reports and is shocked to discover that Zara was in a coma after being shot. Alina tries to bring them together, but they see through her plan.

Zara discovers that Kabir became a writer after publishing a book on their relationship and moves to Lucknow with Azra. They finally decide to give their relationship another chance angering Zeenat and Shahbaz. Shahbaz again tries to have her killed, but Kabir saves her every time.

The Ahmads rejoice at the couple's reunion prospect, and Kabir insults Irfan, asking the Qazi to beg him to take Zara back. Upset, Zara breaks up with Kabir, while Irfan has a heart attack. Ayesha is heartbroken and asks him to leave the house. He starts living in the mosque.

=== One month later ===
Zara learns about Ayesha's illness from Kashan and decides to go back only for Ayesha's sake. She decides to reunite Ayesha and Kabir on Eid. Shahbaz and Zeenat worry that Zara and Kabir might get back together, so Shahbaz constantly provokes Kabir against Zara. According to the Sharia Board, all the board members should attend the Eid celebrations with their entire families.

Shahbaz tries to foil the plan, but Zara is the event organizer and manages the situation. Rukhsaar returns and the family is unaware of it. Zara and Azra succeed in reuniting Kabir and Ayesha with Rukhsaar's help. Rukhsaar vows to reunite Kabir and Zara. Zara tried to find out who shot her on 12 April. Rizwan misleads her and tells her that he did not attack Kabeer purposely but was blackmailed by someone else. Rizwan begins to plan his revenge against Shahbaz and Kabeer. He plans to frame Shahbaz for Kabeer's murder. During this time, Kabeer and Zara start working together at an NGO and go to a village to help save kids education. In the village, Shahbaz plans the explosion of the warehouse while Rizwan plans to put Zara and Kabeer inside the warehouse so that Shahbaz gets the blame for their death. Kabeer and Zara escape in time and come back to give Khula and separate. It is then revealed that Rukhsaar never intended to reunite Kabeer and Zara and instead plot to take revenge and ruin their lives. Rukhsaar, with the help of Rizwan, start planning and plotting against Zara and Kabir, but their plans constantly fail. Zain comes from Mumbai after saving Zara from being arrested (which was part of Rukshaar's plan to trouble Zara ), and Salma and Irfan plan his wedding to Zara. Kabir forbids them from informing Ayesha about Zara's upcoming wedding, while Zara tells Kabir to attend her wedding agree to her getting married before she does, which Kabir agrees to. While worsening her condition under the pretense of taking care of her, Rukhsaar's evil plans are discovered by Ayesha on Zara's wedding day. Still, before exposing her, Rukhsaar smothers Ayesha with a pillow and kills her. Ayesha's last rites are performed, Kabir agrees to Zara get married, but Zara's wedding is canceled.

With the help of Imran, Zara and Kabir discover Rizwan's plans and get him arrested. Kabir then realizes that his presence around Zara is not the reason for putting their lives in danger from previous events. He then goes to Irfan and Salma to ask for Zara's hand in marriage, which they agree to. Kabir takes Zara out on a date and proposes to Zara, but their happiness is short-lived as Shahbaz shoots and kills Zara on that same night. A truck runs over Zara's car and pushes it off a cliff, exploding, and Zara is declared dead.

=== One Year Later ===
It has been a year since Zara's death. Kabir, who goes by the name of Johnny, lives in a mosque. He helps police officers in disabling bombs without protection, deliberately trying to get himself killed so that he can reunite with Zara. Salma is unwell and is hoping for Kabir to return soon. Rukhsaar rules the Ahmed house and is blackmailing Shahbaz using the evidence of Zara's death against him. It is later revealed that Rukhsaar was the one who got Zara's car run over, killing her in an explosion. While in the wild, Kabir saves a girl from thugs who coincidentally have the name Zara.

On the day of Zara's first death anniversary, Kabir goes back to Lucknow to visit Zara's grave, next to Ayesha's. Back to where he was, Kabir sees Salma in a car with Azra looking unwell. He decides to follow them and finds out that Salma has been ill since Zara's departure.

Imran informs Shahbaz about Kabir's return, and Shahbaz asks Kabir to return home. Shahbaz is pleased with the return of his son. Rukhsar forces Shahbaz to ask Kabir to stay in Lucknow for 2 weeks in order to get closer to him. Kabir agrees but does not want to have any relationship with Rukhsar. The girl Zara, who was saved by Kabir, travels to Lucknow to meet the children. She raised three children from their very childhood, but they were kidnapped by Abid Ali, Zara wants to help them and free them. Abid Ali offers friendship to Shahbaz, but he refuses after the identity of Abid Ali is revealed and he is accused of child trafficking. Zara meets Qazi Irfan Siddiqui at the mosque. She tells him about the children, and that she does not have a home. Qazi Irfan Siddiqui invites her to his home, his wife and Azra warmly welcome the new Zara.

The question arises about the guardianship of children. Kabir and New Zara learn that the parents of two children have died, and the parents of the third child refused to return the child to the family. Kabir decides to marry Rukhsar in order to arrange custody of the children. The new Zara is not happy about this because she believes that she will be separated from her children, but Kabir hires the new Zara as a tutor to his house. New Zara and Kabir begin to draw closer, Kabir pays no attention to Rukhsar and completely ignores her. In his heart, there are only memories of his Dawn. Rukhsar unites with Shahbaz and they plot against Kabir and the children. Rukhsar tries several times to kill the new Zara and the children, but she fails to do so.

Soon, New Zara will learn more about Zara, whom Kabir was married to, and is trying to find Zara's killer. New Zara learns the truth that Zara was killed by Shahbaz and tells Kabir about it. Kabir tries to kill his father Shahbaz, but he cannot do it for fear of Allah. Shahbaz and Kabir become bitter enemies. Shahbaz and Rukhsar take Kabir to a mental hospital, pretending to be insane. New Zara frees Kabir and tries to help him expose Shahbaz and Rukhsar. After it turns out that Rukhsar is also involved in the death of Zara. Shahbaz previously won elections and became a minister. A decision is made to resign Qazi Irfan Siddiqui and select a new Qazi Lucknow. There are two contenders: Kabir and Jalali. Jalali is a friend of Shahbaz, who unites with Shahbaz and Rukhsar and is plotting against New Zara and Kabir. Jalali is a respected person and has a large number of followers who consider him holy and close to Allah. Zara recognizes Jalali and tells Kabir that Jallali killed her parents by chopping off their heads and bringing them on a platter to little New Zara. New Zara still cannot forget this picture, she is afraid of Jalali. Kabir helps New Dawn to overcome fear and she wants to take revenge on Jalali. Before the elections, Jalali and Shahbaz kidnap members of the Shariah Council to prevent Kabir from becoming the new Qazi. Kabir and New Zara, disguised as drug dealers, go to Jalalpur, where the members of the Shariah Council were taken away. In the village, they are exposed to the magic of Jalali and attacks by the genies, but they defeat Jalali and Kabir becomes the new Qazi of Lucknow. Also in the village of New, Zara met her brother Asim, who did not recognize her because he was a slave of Jalali who had been using opium in large quantities every day since leaving his sister. Kabir and New Zara manage to convince Asim that New Zara is his sister and they take him with them to Lucknow. Jalali, Shahbaz, and Asim are arrested in Lucknow. But Shahbaz and Jalali manage to free themselves. The new Zara realizes that she loves Kabir. Jalali, Shahbaz, and Rukhsar want to remove Kabir from the post of Qazi and appoint Jalali to this position. Rukhsar conspires a plan against Kabir and declares in the Shariah Council that Kabir is not fulfilling his duties as a husband and is cheating on her with New Zara. New Zara confesses to the council that she loves Kabir, but they are not having an affair and Kabir did not know about her feelings for him. The council decides to remove Kabir from the Qazi post. Kabir decides to find a husband for New Zara within a month. The new Zara resists this and begs Kabir to marry her, but he refuses. As a result, Kabir finds the husband of New Zara and she leaves with him.

Several months later, Rukhsar is still living with Kabir as his wife but they are no longer married, it is also revealed that Rukhsar is pregnant and Shabhaz is bedridden. In a flashback, it is shown that New Zara did not leave with her new husband as she left a letter behind for Kabir in which she states that she has been lying to Kabir the whole time. In the letter, she reveals to him that her real name is Babli and she was posing as a 'Zara' only to con him but did not do so as she really fell in love with him.

The Old Zara is revealed to be alive but is living as a doctor who heals patients through music and goes by the name Nargis. Nargis lives with a woman who took care of her after surviving the accident and she addresses her as 'Ammi Jaan'. Kabir meets her but she denies being Zara. Kabir is sure that she is his Zara, so he requests her to visit and heal Salma through her music. Rukhsar too believes that it is Zara so she fills Salma and Irfan's bedroom with wasps/bees and locks them inside. Zara saves them and admits to being the real Zara. Kabir asks her why she lied and says that months ago after coming out of a coma, she saw him with the fake Zara and thought he moved on.

Rukhsar and Zeenat scheme against Zara once again. Miraj and Suraj's brother threatens Irfan's life and kidnaps Zara. He tries to forcefully marry her but Kabir tricks him and his goons and marries Zara instead. Zara finds out that Rukhsar is pregnant. Zara is about to leave Kabir once again but Kabir stops her and tells her that Miraj and Suraj's brother was scheming with Rukhsar but turned against her and blackmailed her into sleeping with him. Rukhsar continues to trouble a helpless Shahbaz who has repented for his sins and reveals to him that she killed Ayesha. Kabir and his family decide to lock Rukhsar in a room with no dangers around her as she is a danger to herself and the unborn baby.

Months later, Zeenat finally spills the beans on Rukhsar and tells everyone that Rukhsar killed Ayesha. Rukhsar tries consuming pills to endanger herself and the child in a bid to save herself but goes into labour. She gives birth to a daughter and hands her over to Kabir and Zara. Rukhsar apologizes to Kabir and Zara for troubling them and they forgive her before she is arrested. Kabir and Zara introduce their daughter to the Shariah Board at home and name her Ayesha.

The show ends with Kabir and Zara tending to a crying Ayesha discussing how much they will love, spoil and install good values in their daughter, Ayesha.

== Cast ==
=== Main ===
- Adnan Khan as Mawlawi Kabir Ali Ahmed: Shahbaaz and Ayesha's younger son; Kashan and Alina's brother; Zara's husband (2018–2020)
- Eisha Singh as Zara Ahmed (née Siddiqui): Irfaan and Salma's daughter; Kabir's wife (2018–2019, 2020)

=== Recurring ===
- Vinay Jain / Anupam Bhattacharya as Shahbaz Ali Ahmed: Ayesha's widower; Kashan, Kabir and Alina's father; Amaan's grandfather (2018–2019)/(2019–2020)
- Gunn Kansara as Ayesha Ahmed (née Hussain): Shahbaz's wife; Kashan, Kabir and Alina's mother; Amaan's paternal grandmother (2018–2019) (Dead)
- Shipsy Rana as Rukhsar Sheikh (formerly Ahmed) (formerly Alghazi) Zeenat's sister; Kabir and Hamdaan's ex-wife; Ayesha's murderer (2018–2020)
- Monica Khanna as Zeenat Ahmed (née Sheikh): Kashan's wife; Rukhsar's sister; Amaan's mother (2018–2020)
- Anjita Poonia as Alina Nabi (née Ahmed): Shahbaz and Ayesha's daughter; Kashan and Kabir's sister; Amir's wife (2018–2019)
- Ankit Vyas as Rizwan Siddiqui (2019)
- Abdur Rehman Shaikh as Amaan Ahmed: Kashan and Zeenat's son (2019–2020)
  - Toshi Shaikh as Young Amaan Ahmad (2018)
- Amit Kumar Poddar as Turram Khan (2019–2020)
- Amit Dolawat as Army officer Amir Nabi: Alina's husband (2019)
- Dhiraj Rai as Kashan Ali Ahmed: Shahbaz and Ayesha's elder son; Kabir and Alina's brother; Amaan's father (2018–2020)
- Suneel Pushkarna as Qazi Irfaan Siddiqui: Zara's father (2018–2020)
- Shalini Arora as Salma Siddiqui; Zara's mother (2018–2020)
- Kanika Gautam as Azhra Siddiqui (2019–2020)
- Kinshuk Vaidya as Zain Abdullah (2019)
- Aliraza Namdaar as Wali Khan (2019)
- Ashutosh Semwal as Imran Mirza (2018–2019)
- Rutpanna Aishwarya Sethi as Reema Gupta (2018–2019)
- Piyush Sahdev as Siraj Ahmed: Underworld Don of Kashmir (2018)
- Gautam Vig as Miraj Ahmed (2018–2019)
- Nisha Nagpal as Nilofer Ali: Rukhsar's friend (2018)
- Aliraza Namdar as Priest Imam Hashim Mian (2019)
- Deepali Saini as Kausar Mehrami / Kausar Bilal Hassan (2019)
- Salman Shaikh as Bilal Hassan (2019)
- Kiimmy Kaur as Dr. Sabina Hussain (2019)
- Shefali Rana as Tabassum Hussain (2019)
- Worshipp Khanna as Chef Deven (2019)
- Zafar Ali as Aabid Ali (2019)
- Azinkya Mishra as Zaid Khan (2019-2020)
- Puvika Gupta as Firdaus Naaz (2019-2020)
- Tejaswee Bhadane as Alisha Pradhan (2019–2020)
- Vishesh Sharma as Hamdaan Alghazi (2018)
- Manish Khanna as Jalali (2020)
- Ayush Shrivastava as Asim (2020)
- Urvashi Upadhay as Begum Noor Jahan (2020)
- Ravi Bhatia as Sartaj Ahmad (2020)
- Zeeshan Ahmed Khan as Azib Zafar Ahmed (2018–2019)
- Tunisha Sharma as Babli (Zara): Caretaker for Zaid, Alisha and Firdaus (2019–2020)

== Production ==
=== Development and premiere ===
On 15 October 2017, during the telecast of Zee Rishtey Awards while celebrating its 25th anniversary, Zee TV unveiled its new logo and announced the show by releasing a teaser of this series under the title Subhan Allah along with other three shows under its new strapline Aaj Likhenge Kal.

Before its premiere, it was titled as Ishq Pakeezah but was later changed to Ishq Subhan Allah.

Deepak Rajadhyaksha, Deputy Business Head, Zee TV said, "We started 2018 with the launch of two beautifully curated shows, Aap Ke Aa Jane Se and Kaleerein – each of which has touched upon a contemporary Indian reality and is sensitizing the masses about the same. Our next primetime fiction offering belongs to the Muslim social drama space that we had, ourselves, pioneered with Qubool Hai, a show that enjoyed an immensely successful run of two seasons. Ishq Subhan Allah asks viewers to pause and reflect on the true interpretation of religion in our daily lives. It questions the true importance we accord to a woman's choice in every decision that a couple makes, including entering the institution of marriage as also ending it with dignity".

Dheeraj Kumar, the producer of the show said, "With Ishq Subhan Allah, we want to break the stereotype and urge people to take a rational stance in matters of religion. We want to spread the message that adherence to religion cannot come at the cost of compromising practicality. Instead, one must apply the core fundamentals of one's religion to move forward in life."

Adnan Khan expressed, "Kabeer's character is of a young Maulvi with a thorough understanding of Islam. While he is very traditional and culture-driven, his personality and outlook are extremely different from Zara's. Being a Muslim, I could easily adapt myself to certain aspects of Kabeer's character which helped me a lot during my preparation. In fact, I could also strongly relate to his inner instincts and religious traits as I am extremely religious in real life, albeit with a modern touch. The concept of the show is extremely engaging and I am looking forward to this exciting new journey".

Eisha Singh said, "Ishq Subhan Allah is a unique concept with a strong message. Zara is a strong and confident woman who doesn't fear any consequences and isn't afraid to ask the right questions. She is deeply rooted in her religious teachings of the Holy Quran but applies them intelligently to life with logical reasoning. Zara is progressive but she isn't a rebel or an atheist. She has studied Islam in depth and stands up against the misinterpretation of its teachings. Moreover, I am really excited to play such a strong character and I hope that the audience will enjoy watching this side of me."

In November 2019, Zee TV's home production house, Essel Vision Productions took over the production of the series from Creative Eye Limited.

Owing COVID-19 outbreak, the shootings were stalled since 19 March 2020 and the series telecast was halted midway on 20 March 2020 and was expected to resume shoot after the lockdown ends. In April 2020, it was speculated not returning, being axed abruptly by the channel due to the losses caused during the lockdown. However, in July 2020, it was reported that the show has got an extension and the makers have brought back the original lead, Eisha Singh on the show.

=== Release ===
The first teaser of the show was released on 15 October 2017 under the title Subhan Allah.

The first promo of the series was released on 10 February 2018 featuring the leads Eisha Singh and Adnan Khan depicting their different ideologies on Islam.

=== Casting ===
Eisha Singh was selected to play Zara Siddiqui's character and Adnan Khan was cast to play Kabeer Ahmed.

In October 2019, Eisha Singh quit the show to look for new opportunities and her character was shown falling down the cliff. After Eisha's exit, Tunisha Sharma was cast as the new female lead of the show.

In late June 2020, when filming was about to resume after the halt owing to the COVID-19 pandemic, it was reported that Tunisha Sharma will make an exit from the show and the channel has approached the original lead, Eisha Singh to return to the show. However, Eisha didn't confirm her return to the show.

On 3 July 2020, Eisha Singh confirmed to be returning to the show and Tunisha Sharma confirmed her exit from the show. Sharma's character was later revealed to be an imposter.

=== Marketing ===
To promote the show, Zee TV launched Galat Galat Galat, a marketing campaign which drives conversations about the misinterpretations of Islam. Showing protagonist Zara Siddiqui's point of view this campaign delivered a strong message against Triple Talaq system. A special profile was created for Zara Siddiqui on YouTube, Facebook and Twitter to share stories and videos about her point of view and interpretation of Islam derived from the Quran.

=== Training ===
"I am learning Urdu. There are certain words that I had to repeat at least 30 to 40 times to pronounce them properly. I was born and brought up in a typical Hindu family, but the plus point is that I am from Bhopal so I am familiar with the culture. I also learnt how to perform namaaz. Islam is such a beautiful religion,".

— Eisha Singh

=== Filming ===
Based on the backdrop of Lucknow, the series is mainly filmed on the sets created at Mira Road in Mumbai with some initial sequences were shot in Lucknow as the show's storyline is based in Lucknow. The honeymoon track of Zara and Kabeer was shot in Kashmir Valley in April 2018.

=== Writing ===
“Being a practising Muslim, I have a knowledge of the religion. We also had many scholars on board for research. We confirmed and consulted with the scholars at any point of doubt. Our intentions are very clear because we do not want to hurt anyone.”

— Danish Javed

=== Broadcast ===
The airing of the series was shifted from its earlier 10:00pm IST slot to 10:30pm IST slot from 25 February 2020.

The production and airing of the show was halted indefinitely in late March 2020 due to the COVID-19 outbreak in India. It was expected to resume on 1 April 2020 but could not and the series was last broadcast on 20 March 2020 when the remaining episodes were aired. After four months, the production and filming of the series resumed on 12 July 2020. The airing of the series was resumed from 3 August 2020.

=== Cancellation ===
The ratings of the show had dropped before the lockdown and it was reported to go off air after the lockdown. The show received an extension as the replacement show was not ready. The shooting of the series wrapped up on 29 September 2020.

The show ended on 2 October 2020 after two and a half years.

== Reception ==
=== Critical response ===
Ishq Subhan Allah deals with the sensitive and burning issue of Triple Talaq due to which it received negative criticism from some Muslims. Following the first week of its premiere, the show created disappointment between the Muslims and a complaint was filed by Raza Academy, an Islamic association based in Mumbai against the show for the wrongful representation of religious facts and maligning the image of the religion.

The complaint by the academy stated that the show "shows Islam in a bad light, the scripts of the entire serial is made to understand that Islam religion needs a lot of changes, revival, amendments".

Since the show is based on a religious concept, many Muslim priests like the Shariat Board Chief, Imam Organization, and Jamiat Ulama-e-Hind had also raised objections against the show.

Following a month of its premiere, India Today stated that the well-written characters of Zara and Kabir developed the loyal fan following of the show over a month of its run and the concept of Triple Talaq has aroused the interest of the viewers and further expressed, "Apart from its bold and relevant theme, the show's narrative has been spun in an interesting way with well-etched out characters".

On the reception of the show in such short span of time, Deepak Rajadhyaksha the Deputy Business Head of Zee TV said, "In keeping with our brand philosophy Aaj likhenge Kal, it is our constant endeavor to present viewers with progressive stories that are not only entertaining but also provoke them into thinking differently, get inspired, take charge of their destiny and work towards an extraordinary future. With Ishq Subhan Allah, we bring audiences the love story of a Muslim couple where the man and woman beg to differ on matters of interpreting and applying religion to their daily lives. We have dwelled into the issue of Triple Talaaq which was never spoken about in a prime-time fiction show. The response that the show has received in its opening week stands testimony to the universal applause and the warm welcome given to the show by Indian audiences."

== Soundtrack ==
Ishq Subhan Allah Original Sound Track

Soundtrack album by Mukul Puri
- Released: 14 March 2018
- Genre: Romance Soundtrack
- Length: 8:59
- Languages: Hindi; Urdu
- Label: Zee Music Company
- Producer: Dheeraj Kumar

Ishq Subhan Allah's soundtrack is written by A. M. Turaz and composed by Mukul Puri. Mukul Puri had composed the title song and the background score for the show. Ishq Subhan Allah, the title song of the show, is sung by Javed Ali.

Ishq Subhan Allah: Tracklisting
No.	Title	Artist	Length
1.	"Ishq Subhan Allah"	Javed Ali	7:19
2.	"Ishq Jaaniya"	Mukul Puri	1:40

== Spin-off ==
A spin-off web series was launched in 2019. The web series starring Angad Hasija, Ankitta Sharma and Paras Kalnawat was titled Ishq Aaj Kal.
