= Raaton Ka Raja =

- रातों का राजा
- Directed by: Rajesh Nahta
- Starring: Dheeraj Kumar; Shatrughan Sinha
- Music by: Rahul Dev Burman
- Release date: 21 July 1970
- Country: India
- Language: Hindi

Raaton Ka Raja is a 1970 Bollywood drama film. The film stars Dheeraj Kumar and Shatrughan Sinha. This is first film of Dheeraj Kumar. The movie was directed and produced by Rajesh Nahta and Rahul Dev Burman was the music director. The film reportedly "ran fairly well”. But it marked a moment in the career of Dheeraj Kumar when his "stock as a hero started falling."

== Cast ==
- Shatrughan Sinha
- Dheeraj Kumar
- Rajendra Nath
- Jeevan
- JayshreeT.a

== Soundtrack ==
Track#	Title	Singer(s)
1	"Raton Ka Raja Hu Mai"	Mohammed Rafi
2	"Dur Se Tera Deewana Aaya Hai Ruk Jana"	Mohammed Rafi, Asha Bhosle
3	"Aana To Sajani Din Ko Aana"	Mohammed Rafi
4	"Pyar Kiya Toh Darna Kya, Pyar Kia Koi Daru Nhi"	Mahendra Kapoor, Shamshad Begum
5	"Aye Dekho Toh Yahan Koi Nahi Hai"	Asha Bhosle
6	"Mohabbat Se Tumhen Dekha Magar Tum Jane Kya Samjhe"	Mohammed Rafi, Lata Mangeshkar
7	"Jhanak Jhan Ghunghru Baja"	Lata Mangeshkar
