= V. K. Samaranayake =

Sri Lankan computer scientist (1939–2007)

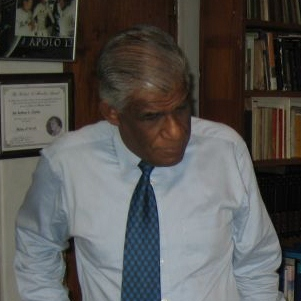
- Born: 22 May 1939; Colombo, Sri Lanka
- Died: 6 June 2007 (aged 68); Stockholm, Sweden
- Education: King's College London; University of Ceylon; Royal College, Colombo; Ananda College
- Spouse: Sriya Samaranayake
- Children: 2
- Scientific career
- Fields: Computer science
- Workplaces: University of Colombo
- Website: vksamaranayake.org

V. K. Samaranayake (Sinhala: වී. කේ. සමරනායක; 1939 – 6 June 2007) pioneered computing & IT development industry and usage in Sri Lanka and thus considered as the "Father of Information Technology" in Sri Lanka. He was a Professor of Computer Science and former Dean of the Faculty of Science, University of Colombo. Prof Samaranayake played a major role in the development of IT and IT related education in Sri Lanka. He was, at the time of his death, the chairman of the Information and Communication Technology Agency (ICTA) of Sri Lanka and was the founding and former director of the University of Colombo School of Computing (UCSC).

== Early life and education ==
Samaranayake was born to Mr. and Mrs. V. W. Samaranayake on 22 May 1939. He started his primary schooling at Ananda College. He completed his secondary education with distinction at the Royal College Colombo and went on to do his higher studies at the University of Ceylon. He graduated with a BSc in Special Mathematics (First Class Honors) in 1961 and then proceeded to England for his post-graduate studies on a Ceylon Government Scholarship for Mathematics. He received a Diploma of Imperial College from Imperial College and a PhD from King's College London, both in the field of Mathematical Physics.

== Family ==
Samaranayake was married to Sriya Samaranayake, the former Deputy Commissioner of the Inland Revenue Department. His brother was V. A. Samaranayake, a Professor at the University of Missouri–Rolla. He was the father of Nayana Samaranayake, who founded sl2college. and Samitha Samaranayake, who is currently an Assistant Professor in Cornell University.

== Death ==
Samaranayake died in Stockholm, Sweden, on 6 June 2007. The Sri Lankan Government awarded Samaranayake a funeral with state patronage at the Independence Square, Colombo, on 13 June 2007, as an appreciation of the contributions and accomplishments of Prof Samaranayake.

== Career ==
After completing his education, Samaranayake went on to serve the University of Ceylon (in 1974, University of Ceylon was abolished and University of Colombo created from the Colombo campus of the former university) for the next 43 years since 1961. He was appointed Professor of Mathematics and Head of the Department of Mathematics in 1974 and Dean of the Faculty of Science in 1975.

Samaranayake was the founder of the Department of Statistics and Computer Science (DSCS) in 1985 and of the Institute of Computer Technology (ICT) of the University of Colombo in 1987. These two institutions were merged as the University of Colombo School of Computing in 2002.

Samaranayake served the Council for Information Technology (CINTEC), the apex National agency for IT in Sri Lanka, as its chairman for a period of 12 years. In the field of IT, he has pioneered work on IT Policy, Legal Infrastructure, EDI/E-Commerce, Security, Internet Technology, Computer Awareness and IT Education. In 2004, Prof. Samaranayake became the chairman of the Information and Communication Technology Agency (ICTA), the government agency governing the ICT in Sri Lanka; he held the post till his death in 2007. He was the President of the Sri Lanka Association for the Advancement of Science during its golden jubilee in 1994. At the time of his death, he was the president of Infotel Lanka Society.

== Fellowships ==
Samaranayake was associated with the International Centre for Theoretical Physics (ICTP) in Trieste, Italy since 1969 as a UNESCO Fellow in Mathematical Physics (1969), IAEA Fellow in Mathematical Physics (1971), Associate Member (1972–1977) and a Senior Member since 1978.

He was a Fellow of the Harvard Information Infrastructure Project in 2001 and a Research Fellow of the National Centre for Digital Government in 2003, both at Harvard Kennedy School at Harvard University.

He was a Fellow of the Reuters Digital Vision Program at Stanford University in 2005.

== Awards ==
- The Government of Sri Lanka has honoured Samaranayake for his contribution to IT in the country by awarding of the award of Vidya Prasadini in 1997 and the national honour Vidya Jyothi in 1998.
- The Japan International Cooperation Agency (JICA) has presented its President's Award for International Cooperation to Prof. Samaranayake in 1996 in recognition of his contribution.
- The University of Colombo, at its convocation held in January 2005, conferred on Prof. Samaranayake the Degree of Doctor of Science (Honoris Causa) for his outstanding contribution to the University of Colombo.

== Major contributions ==
Samaranayake was actively involved in the formulation of the WASO 10646 standard for Sinhalese Characters and in the development of multilingual websites and has been instrumental in helping to apply computers in many areas of governance, including in national elections. In 1999, he chaired the National Y2K Task Force that coordinated the very successful crossover to the year 2000. More recently, he initiated the External Degree of Bachelor of Information Technology (BIT) of the University of Colombo, which, in its very first year of operation, has attracted 5000 registrations. He was the Chairman of the Project Management Committee of the SIDA-funded project to enhance the internet connectivity of Sri Lankan Universities. At the time of his death, he was involved in introducing ICT to rural communities and was engaged in developing Multipurpose Community Tele-Centers. He was a member of the advisory panel of the Asia IT&C program of the European Commission.

=== Books published ===
- Mulika Tharaka Vidyava, M.D. Gunasena & Co. Ltd. (1965) (A book on elementary Astronomy in Sinhala) *Tharaka – A reprint of the section on Stars of "Mulika Tharaka Vidyava" (1999)

=== Research Publications ===
- A New Determination of the Pion-Nucleon Coupling Constant and S-Wave Scattering Lengths (with W.S. Woolcock) Phy. Rev. Lett. 15 (1965) 936 – 938.
- Determination of the Pion-Nucleon Coupling Constant and s-Wave Scattering Lengths (with W.S. Woolcock) Proceedings of the Lund Conference on Elementary Particles (1969).
- Determination of the Pion-Nucleo n P-Wave and d-Wave Scattering Lengths (with B.P. Collins and W.S. Woolcock) Proceedings of the Lund Conference on Elementary Particles (1969).
- Spin and D-State Effects on High Energy Elastic Scattering of Pions on 3He (with H. Baier) Nucl. Phys. B15 (1970).
- Elastic Scattering of Low Energy Pions by Alpha Particles (with Harun-ar-Rashid) Nucl. Phys. B17 (1970).
- High Energy Scattering of Hadrons on 6Li (with Il-Tong Cheon) Nucl. Phys. A154 (1970) 93 – 96.
- Elastic Scattering of Pions on 4He at Small Momentum Transfer (with H. Baier) Nucl. Phy. B24 (1970) 273 – 284.
- S' and D' State Effects in 3He Form Factors and in p-3He Elastic Scattering Cross Sections (with G. Wilk) Lett. al Nuovo Cimento 4 (1972) 27 – 32.
- Determination of the Pion-Nucleon Coupling Constant and S- Wave Scattering Lengths (with W.S. Woolcock) Nucl. Phys. B48 (1972) 205 – 224.
- Forward Dispersion Relation Constraints on the Pion-Nucleon P-Wave and D-Wave Scattering Lengths (with W.S. Woolcock) Nucl. Phys. B49 (1972) 128 – 140.
- High Energy Nuclear Scattering and Rising Cross Sections Lett. Nuovo Cim 9 (1974) 677.

== See also ==
- Information Technology in Sri Lanka
