= Shipsy Rana =

Indian actress

- Occupation: Actress
- Years active: 2018–present
- Known for: Ishq Subhan Allah

Shipsy Rana is an Indian television actress. She is known for her playing Rukhsar Sheikh in Ishq Subhan Allah. She won ITA Award for Best Actress in a Negative Role for her role in Ishq Subhan Allah in 2018.

== Television ==
Year	Title	Role	Notes
2018–2020	Ishq Subhan Allah	Rukhsar Sheikh	Debut, Antagonist

== Awards and nominations ==
Year	Award	Category	Work	Result
2018	Indian Television Academy Awards	Best Actor In Negative Role (Female)	Ishq Subhan Allah	Won
