= Beharoopia =

- Directed by: Rajesh Nanda
- Starring: Helen
- Release date: 11 December 1971
- Country: India
- Language: Hindi

Beharoopia is a 1971 Bollywood fantasy film directed by Rajesh Nanda and produced by Ram Kumar. The film stars Helen and Hiralal in lead role.

== Cast ==
- Helen
- Hiralal
- Dheeraj Kumar as Ajay
- Snehlata as Padmini
- Daisy Irani
- Honey Irani

== Music ==
Track#	Title	Singer(s)
1	"Bhanwre Sun Sun Kahe Kare Gun Gun"	Asha Bhosle, Mahendra Kapoor
2	"Bin Baja O Sapere"	Asha Bhosle
3	"Ai Meri Banu Ai Meri Husn Banu"	Usha Khanna
4	"O Re Banke Sipahiya Ran Banke"	Asha Bhosle
5	"Kya Tu Hai Kya Wahi Hai"	Asha Bhosle, Nandu Bohra
6	"Uye Ma Uye Ma Koi Bachaye"	Asha Bhosle, Usha Khanna
