= Nadaniyaan =

- Genre: Sitcom
- Created by: BIG Magic
- Inspired by: Nadaniyan
- Developed by: Creative Eye Limited
- Directed by: Bhupesh K. Kumar
- Creative directors: Shashank Shrivastava (Creative Eye); Paritosh Painter (Network)
- Presented by: BIG Magic
- Starring: Iqbal Azad; Gunn Kansara; Gaurav Sharma; Baldev Trehan
- Music by: Abhijeet Hegdepatil KK
- Country of origin: India
- Original language: Hindi
- No. of seasons: 3
- No. of episodes: 538

Production
- Executive producer: Priya Panchmatiya
- Producer: Dheeraj Kumar (Creative Eye Productions) Sagar Pictures
- Production location: Delhi
- Editors: Lalit Tiwari, Rohit Singh
- Running time: 23 minutes
- Production company: Creative Eye Productions Sagar Pictures

Original release
- Network: BIG Magic
- Release: 9 September 2013 – 23 January 2017

Nadaniyaan is a Hindi sitcom presented by BIG Magic and produced by Dheeraj Kumar and later produced by Sagar Pictures. An official adaption of the Pakistani sitcom Nadaaniyaan, it stars Iqbal Azad, Gunn Kansara, Gaurav Sharma, Baldev Trehan, Samiksha Bhatt, Upasana Singh, Alok Nath, Jay Pathak, and Neelam Sivia.

== Plot ==
The story is about a family of four that lives in New Delhi.

== Seasons ==
The series had three seasons.

- Season 1 – Nadaniyaan (2013–2014)
- Season 2 – Uff! Yeh Nadaniyaan! (2014–2015)
- Season 3 – Total Nadaniyaan! (2015)
- Season 4 – Phir Yeh Nadaniyaan! (2016–2017)

== Cast ==
- Iqbal Azad / Jay Pathak as Naman "Nandu" Verma: Nandu is a television writer and a full-time house husband who loves his wife Chandni and his younger brother Pushkar. Nandu is lazy and often mocked by his wife about his unemployment.
- Gunn Kansara / Neetha Shetty / Samiksha Bhatt as Chandani Verma "Chandu": Chandu is the matriarch of the Verma family and has a clerical job. She usually scolds Nandu & Pappu due to their lazy attitudes towards life.
- Gaurav Sharma as Pushkar "Pappu" Verma /Chota Don: The youngest member of Verma family who loves to flirt with girls wearing fake designer clothes in order display to others his sister-in-law's wealth.
- Baldev Trehan / Nithyanandam Ramachandra as Bhagwan Uncle :A troublesome neighbor who is always seen wandering on Nandu's lawn.He has two wives and claims to have 7 fathers. Having a chat with him is like intentionally going wanting to kill oneself - as felt by Pappu. Like Pappu, he likes to flirt with girls much younger than himself.
- Upasana Singh as Taravanti Verma: Nandu and Pappu's mother.
- Alok Nath as "Babuji", the deceased father of Nandu and Pappu, Alok Nath, portrayed as a "Sanskaari Bebuji" whose photo is prominently displayed on one of the drawing room walls and his portrait is often referred to by Pappu to emotionally blackmail his brother Nandu. This comic punch is used in the wake of Alok Nath's jokes that showed Nath as a "Sanskaari Babuji". Babuji currently accompanies them in a comic role.
- Garima Tiwari as Taniya : Chandu's Sister and Pappu 's love interest.
- Abhishek Verma as Jasveer "Jassi" Singh, Jassi's brother
- Shalini Sahuta as Jasmeet "Jassi" Verma, Pappu's Wife
- Raja Jung Bahadur as Raja Jung Bahadur, Watchman
- Gajendra Chauhan as Mr. Chaddha, Secretary of society where Verma's live.
- Jaiprakash Lalwani as KitamKitu, Boss
- Zeba Hussain (bride)
