= Gunn Kansara =

Indian television actress

- Born: 22 December; Mumbai, Maharashtra, India
- Occupation: Actress
- Years active: 2001–present
- Known for: Mrs. Kaushik Ki Paanch Bahuein; Nadaniyaan; Ishq Subhan Allah; Mehndi Wala Ghar

Gunn Kansara (born 22 December) is an Indian actress who primarily works in Hindi television. Kansara is best known for playing Gehna Kaushik in Mrs. Kaushik Ki Paanch Bahuein, Chandni Verma in Nadaniyaan, Ayesha Hussain Ahmed in Ishq Subhan Allah and Swara Ajay Agarwal in Mehndi Wala Ghar.

== Television ==
Year	Serial	Role	Notes	Ref.
2001–2002	Kohi Apna Sa	Rachana Gill		
2003	Kise Apna Kahein			
2004–2005	Ayushmaan	Sonia		
2005–2007	Sinndoor Tere Naam Ka	Kajal Antariksh Raizada		
2009–2010	Sajan Ghar Jaana Hai	Sudha		
2011–2013	Mrs. Kaushik Ki Paanch Bahuein	Gehna Utkarsh Kaushik		
2013–2014	Nadaniyaan	Chandni "Chandu" Naman Verma		
2016	Savdhaan India	Geeta (Episode 1657)	Episodic Role	
2016	Savdhaan India	Amrita Verma (Episode 1789)	Episodic Role	
2016–2017	Phir Yeh Nadaniyaan!	Chandni "Chandu" Naman Verma		
2018–2019	Ishq Subhan Allah	Ayesha Hussain Ahmed		
2022	Mose Chhal Kiye Jaaye	Malini Girish Verma		
2024	Mehndi Wala Ghar	Swara Ajay Agarwal		
2025	Kabhi Neem Neem Kabhi Shahad Shahad	Vandana Mohan Somani		
2026–present	Yeh Fitoor Tera	Madhu Anoop Mathur		

=== Web Series ===
Year	Title	Role	Notes	Ref.
2023	Fuh Se Fantasy	Mother	Season 2; Episode: "Timeless Desires"	
