= Reuters Digital Vision Program =

Academic program funded by the Reuters Foundation

- Formation: 2001
- Dissolved: 2007

Reuters Digital Vision Program (RDVP) was an academic program.

== History ==
RDVP was funded by the Reuters Foundation and encouraged innovative applications of computing and communications in the developing world. Located at Stanford University's Center for the Study of Language and Information, the Program supported social entrepreneurs and organizations who sought to leverage technology-based solutions in the interest of humanitarian, educational, and sustainable development goals. The Program fostered interdisciplinary projects and prototyping efforts that address real needs in underserved communities.

The core of the Program was a nine-month Fellowship course that brought together 12-15 experienced technologists and social entrepreneurs from around the globe. Candidates from a wide range of corporate, educational, government, and non-profit positions applied to the Program, located on the Stanford campus in the heart of Silicon Valley.

Accepted Fellows spent a sabbatical year in residence at Stanford, where they collaborated with faculty, students, commercial technologists, and — most importantly — each other as they work on their projects. Upon completion of the course, Fellows were awarded a certificate from Stanford.

Each week during the academic year the Reuters Digital Vision Program invited technology leaders and innovators from the academic, corporate, government, and non-profit sectors to visit the Program and host a seminar with the DV Fellows.

== Ending ==
The program ended in 2007.

The last known official post of RDVP was a blogpost on June 19, 2007. The last known fellows' blog post wasn't until January 17, 2010.

== Alumni and staff ==
- Edgardo Herbosa
- Steven Vosloo
- Vipul Arora
- Jason Banico
- Ken Banks
- Dipak Basu
- Sanjay Bhargava
- Scott Bossinger
- Renee Chin
- Karen Coppock
- Laura Cuozzo
- Atanu Dey
- Rupert Douglas-Bate
- Melanie Edwards
- Rajendra Nimje
- Heather Ford
- Mitra Fatolapour
- Saori Fotenos
- Nic Fulton
- Stuart Gannes
- Thomas George
- Aman Grewal
- Steve Ketchpel
- Arnon Kohavi
- Brij Kothari
- Carlos Miranda Levy
- Atif Mumtaz
- Segeni Ng'ethe
- Ken Novak
- Mans Olof-Ors
- Sam Perry
- Robert Maranga
- Daniella Pontes
- Margarita Quihuis
- Pingale Rajeswari
- Netika Raval
- Mark Stevenson
- Erik Sundelof
- V. K. Samaranayake
- Megan Smith
- Helen Wang
- Ed Yoon
- Mercy Wambui
