= Heather Ford =

Researcher, blogger, journalist, social entrepreneur, open source activist

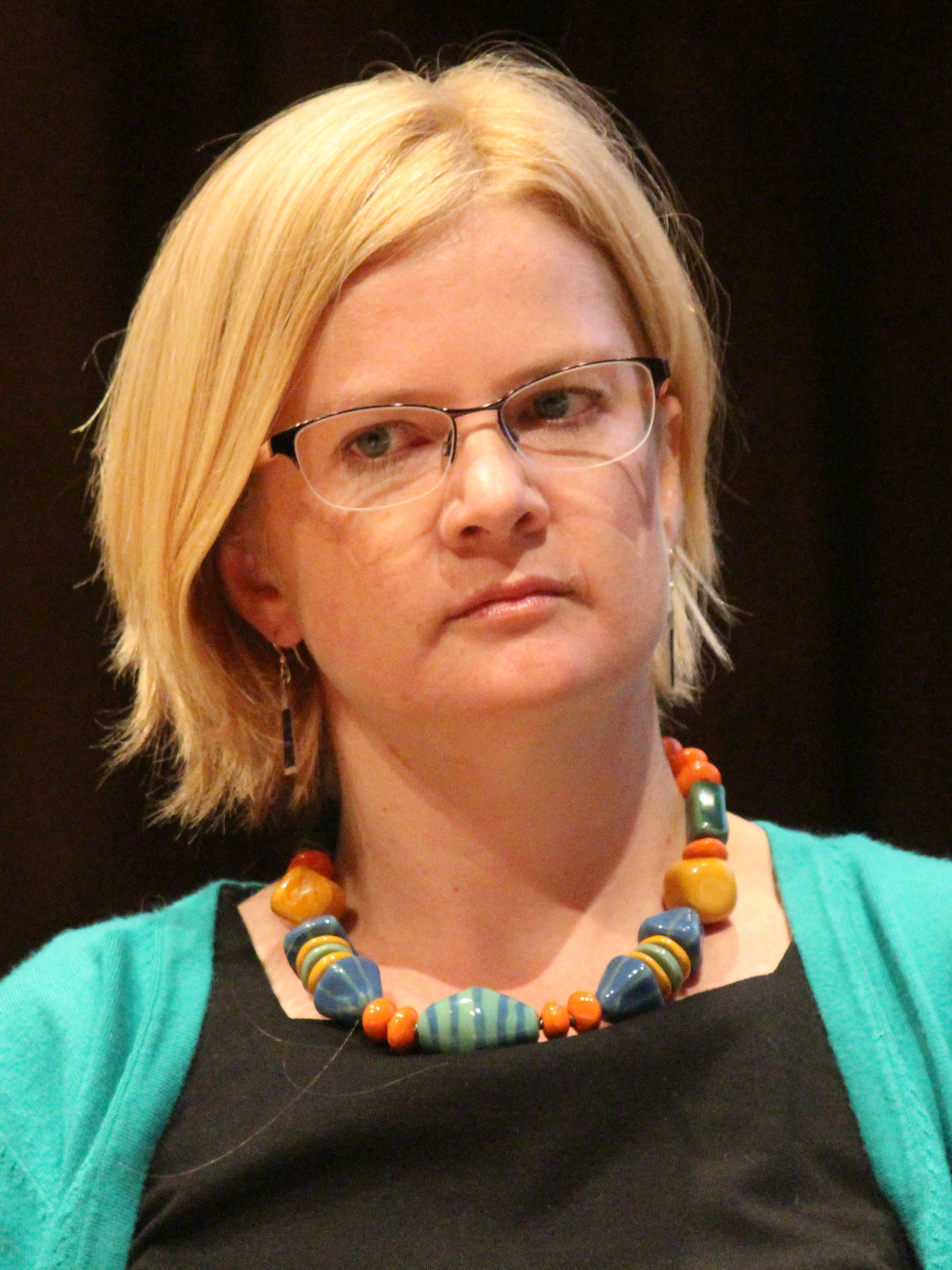
- Ford at Wikimania 2014
- Born: Pietermaritzburg, South Africa
- Occupations: researcher, blogger, journalist, entrepreneur, and activist
- Heather Ford's voice Recorded August 2014

Heather Ford is a South African researcher, blogger, journalist, social entrepreneur and open source activist who has worked in the field of Internet policy, law and management in South Africa, the United Kingdom and the United States. She is the founder of Creative Commons South Africa. She has studied the nature of power within Wikipedia and is a researcher at the University of Leeds.

== Early life and education ==
Ford was born in Pietermaritzburg in the province of Kwa-Zulu Natal, South Africa. She attended Carter High School in Pietermaritzburg.

In 1996, Ford went to Rhodes University to study a four-year Bachelor of Journalism degree majoring in communication design. During her time at Rhodes, Ford was arts and culture editor for the Rhodes student newspaper, Activate, and performed in numerous plays and dance dramas. She co-wrote and starred in the National Arts Festival Fringe Festival play: 'Sincerely, Colour' in 1997 and was considering a career as a dance choreographer before she decided to find work in the media sector.

== Career ==
After working as Digital Information Manager for Johannesburg-based non-profit, the Electoral Institute of Southern Africa from 2000 to 2002, she went to the United Kingdom to work with the Association for Progressive Communications, GreenNet and Privacy International on Internet rights advocacy in Europe.

In 2003, she received a scholarship from Benetech to attend Stanford University as a fellow in the Reuters Digital Vision Program. Volunteering for Creative Commons while she was at Stanford, she decided to go back to South Africa at the end of her studies to start Creative Commons South Africa and a program entitled "Commons-sense: Towards an African Digital Information Commons" at the Wits University Link Centre. She has a postgraduate certificate in telecomms policy from the University of the Witwatersrand. During 2006 Heather co-founded The African Commons Project, a South African non-profit organisation working on the commons in Africa.

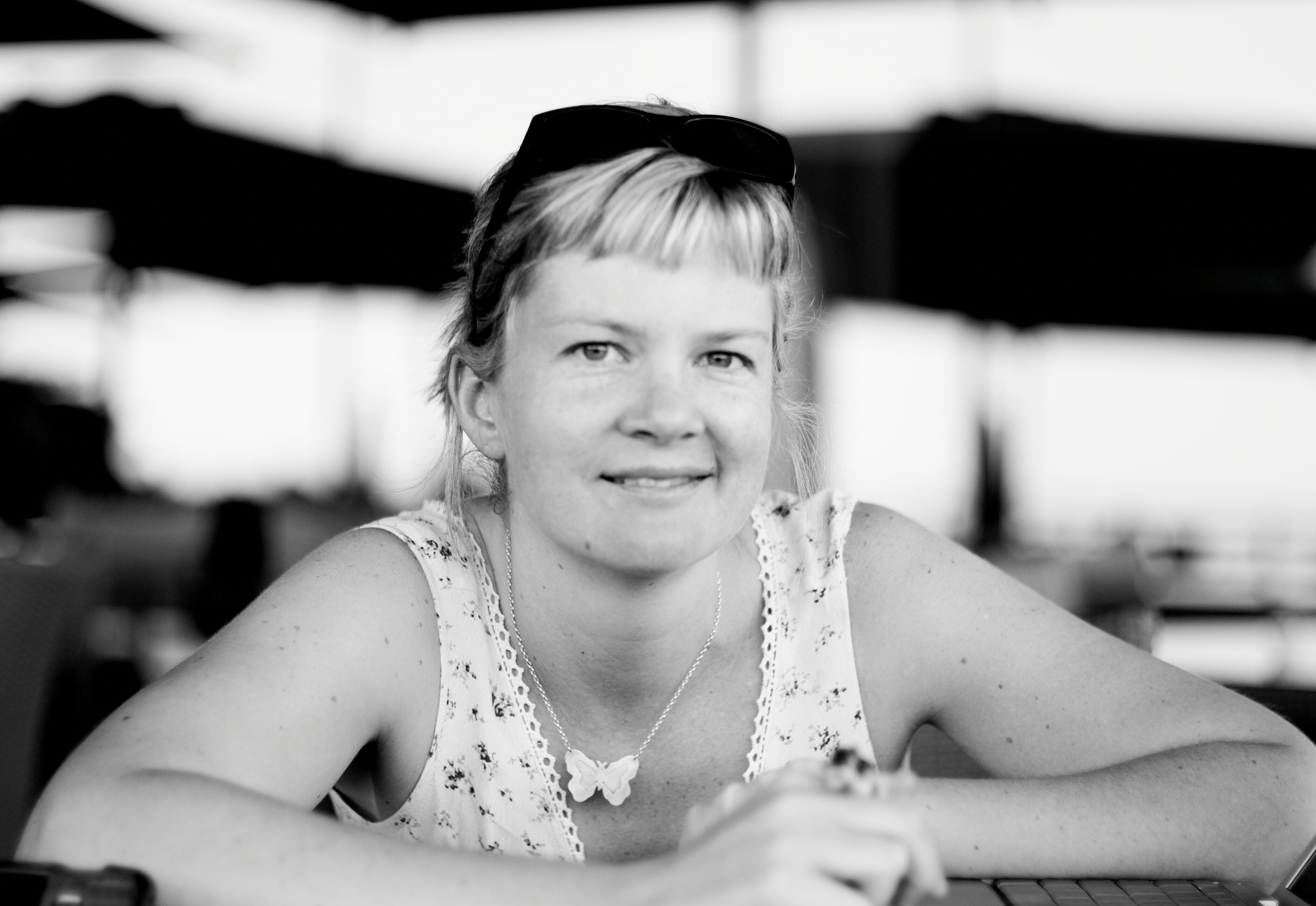
Ford at the iCommons meeting in Dubrovnik 2007

In 2006, Ford was appointed executive director of iCommons, a UK private charitable corporation. Working with Creative Commons, iCommons collaborates with communities interested in open education, access to knowledge, free software, open access publishing and free culture. After iCommons, in 2009 Ford founded the GeekRetreat, an event aiming to bring together technologists from around South Africa to discuss improving the local Internet. She said in 2010 that Creative Commons and Wikipedia are not inclusive enough for the developing world.

Ford was previously a member of the advisory board of the Wikimedia Foundation and earned a master's degree at the University of California, Berkeley School of Information. She has blogged at Thoughtleader and Global Voices, and has been a guest on Reuben Goldberg's 'The Internet Economy'. In 2011, IT News Africa named Ford one of Africa's 10 most influential women in science and tech.

Ford worked as a digital ethnographer at Ushahidi until October 2012 when she began studying for her DPhil at the Oxford Internet Institute, University of Oxford. She gained her PhD from Oxford with her thesis Fact factories: Wikipedia and the power to represent. Since then, she has worked with the Wikimedia Foundation, investigating questions such as the nature of power within Wikipedia. She was a fellow in digital methods at the University of Leeds and is currently at the University of Technology Sydney as an Associate Professor in the School of Communications, the Coordinator of the UTS Data and AI Ethics Cluster, Affiliate of the UTS Data Science Institute, and Associate of the UTS Centre for Media Transition. She spent ten years studying the editing of the Wikipedia article 2011 Egyptian revolution, releasing the book Writing the Revolution in 2022.

=== Boards ===
- The African Commons Project Board: 2006–present
- The Wikimedia Foundation Advisory Board: 2007–2009
- iCommons Board: 2005–2006

== Honors and awards ==
- 2009 – UC Berkeley School of Information Fellowship
- 2009 – Book of South African Women - An annual register of South Africa's top women in business, technology
- 2004 – Stanford BASES social entrepreneurship award for Bookbox, a web-based jukebox of digital books in languages from around the world
- 2003 – Reuters Digital Vision Program Scholarship awarded by Benetech
- 2003 – British Chevening Scholarship awarded by the British government
- 2000 – Rhodes University Academic Colours and Distinction

== Publications ==
- 2009: Open culture in Global Information Society Watch (GISWatch) 2009
- 2013: Getting to the source. Where does Wikipedia get its information from? Coauthored with Shilad Sen, David R. Musicant, and Nathaniel Miller, Presented at WikiSym 2013
- 2022: Writing the Revolution: Wikipedia and the Survival of Facts in the Digital Age. MIT Press. 2022.
- 2023:
  - Ford, Heather; Pietsch, Tamson; Tall, Kelly (29 October 2023). "Gender and the invisibility of care on Wikipedia". Big Data & Society. 10 (2) 20539517231210276. doi:10.1177/20539517231210276.
  - Ford, Heather (2023). "Chapter 13: Becoming eventful through data: The mediated construction of historic events in the age of data". In Coleman, Stephen; Sorensen, Lone (eds.). Handbook of Digital Politics (2nd ed.). Edward Elgar Publishing. pp. 196–241. ISBN 9781800377578.

== See also ==
- Felix Nartey
