= BookBox =

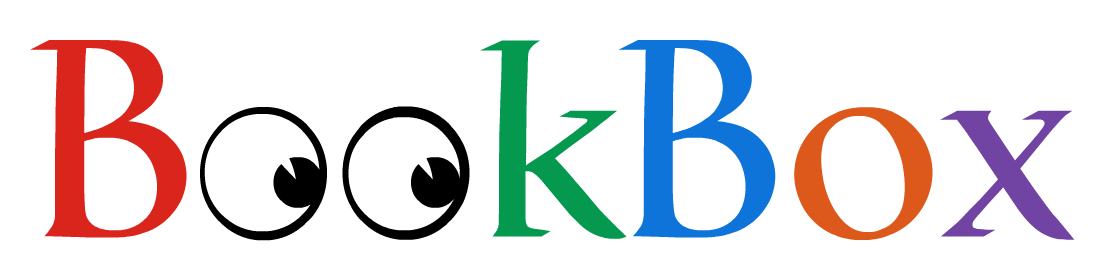
- BookBox Logo (2016)
- Creator: Brij Kothari
- Website: bookbox.com
- Current status: Online

BookBox, a social enterprise located in Pondicherry, India has created ‘AniBooks’, animated stories for children with the narration appearing on-screen as Same Language Subtitles (SLS). Every word is highlighted at the exact timing with the audio narration, thus strengthening reading skills, automatically and subconsciously. BookBox has their videos on their YouTube channel, with over 45 stories in 40 languages. The business was born in 2004 from a student-driven competition, Social e-Challenge, at Stanford University.

SLS’ pedagogical sound and proven technique has won many international awards. Their non-profit partner, PlanetRead, created by Brij Kothari, has also been widely implemented on film song based TV programs in India.

== Languages ==
BookBox offers books in the following languages:

- Arabic
- Assamese
- Bengali
- Bhili
- Catalan
- Chatino
- Danish
- Dutch
- English (US and UK)
- Esperanto
- French
- German
- Greek
- Gujarati
- Hebrew
- Hindi
- Indonesian
- Italian
- Japanese
- Kannada
- Kotava
- Kutchi
- Lidepla
- Mandarin
- Marathi
- Odia
- Polish
- Portuguese
- Romanian
- Russian
- Sanskrit
- Santali
- Spanish
- Swahili
- Tamil
- Telugu
- Turkish
- Urdu
