= Paras Kalnawat =

Indian model and actor (born 1996)

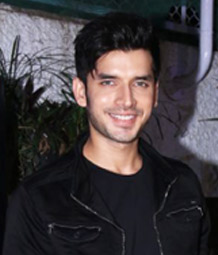
- Kalnawat in 2024
- Born: Paras Bhushan Kalnawat; 9 November 1996 (age 29); Bhandara, Maharashtra, India
- Education: S.K. Somaiya College, Mumbai
- Occupations: Model; Actor
- Years active: 2017–present
- Known for: Meri Durga; Ishq Aaj Kal; Anupamaa; Kundali Bhagya

Paras Kalnawat (born 9 November 1996) is an Indian model and actor best known for portraying Sanjay Singh Ahlawat in Meri Durga, Faraz Sheikh in Ishq Aaj Kal, Samar Shah in Anupamaa and Rajveer Luthra in Kundali Bhagya and Aditya Kashyap in Parineetii.

== Early and personal life ==
Kalnawat, belonging to a Kashmiri Pandit family, was born on 9 November 1996, to a Nagpur-based businessman Bhushan Kalnawat and Anita Kalnawat in Bhandara, a district near Nagpur. He has an elder sister named Pragati Kalnawat Sharma.

He completed his schooling at Sanskar Vidya Sagar and Mohota Science College in Nagpur, and later joined S. K. Somaiya College to earn his Bachelor of Commerce degree. Later, he moved to Mumbai in 2014 to become an actor and completed his dance diploma from Terence Lewis Dance Academy. He also took formal training in acting from Barry John's Acting Classes.

Kalnawat dated his Meri Durga co-star Urfi Javed for six months in 2017. In 2021, he revealed that he is in a serious relationship with someone outside the entertainment industry.

On 27 March 2021, while shooting for Anupamaa, he received the news of his father's sudden demise due to heart attack.

In November 2022, he revealed that he had been diagnosed with Spondylitis during his stint on Jhalak Dikhhla Jaa 10.

== Career ==
=== Modelling and early work (2016–2020) ===
Kalnawat began his career with modelling in 2016, and won the Mr. Multimedia title at the People’s Choice Award – Max Elite Model Look India the same year. He later started his acting career in 2017 by appearing in an episodic role as Dhruv in Aye Zindagi. In July 2017, he made his television debut opposite Srishti Jain in Meri Durga on StarPlus, where he portrayed the lead role of Sanjay Singh Ahlawat until the show went off-air in March 2018.

In May 2018, he was cast to play Rehaan Thakur opposite Priyanka Kandwal in Mariam Khan - Reporting Live by StarPlus, however, he quit the show in September 2018 due to some personal reasons. Later in the same year he portrayed episodic roles in Kaun Hai? and Laal Ishq.

In 2019, he made his digital debut by portraying Shivam Noon in ALT Balaji's Dil Hi Toh Hai 2 opposite Palak Purswani. He went on to play the antihero Faraz Sheikh in all four seasons of Ishq Aaj Kal alongside Ankitta Sharma, Angad Hasija, and Puneett Chouksey in the same year, and reprised his role as Shivam in Dil Hi Toh Hai 3 opposite Poulomi Das in early 2020.

=== Breakthrough and recognition (2020–2022) ===
In March 2020, he signed on to portray the role of Samar Shah in Anupamaa opposite former actress Anagha Bhosale and later on opposite actress Alma Hussein post Bhosale quit the show and acting. It turned out to be a turning point in his career as he became a household name as Samar due to the show's immediate success.

He subsequently appeared in various music videos, including Tere Naal Rehna, Akhaa Vich, Khumariyaan, Yaar Ki Mehfil, and Baadal Barse.

In July 2022, he announced his participation in the dance-based reality show Jhalak Dikhhla Jaa 10. However, this led to the termination of his three-year-long contract by Rajan Shahi, Anupamaa's producer, who termed the actor unprofessional because the show was scheduled to air on the rival channel Colors TV. Kalnawat revealed that he had already informed the makers about this conflict and they had asked him to choose between both shows. He chose Jhalak for his career growth, claiming his ouster to be a PR tactic in support of his former co-actor Anagha's allegations of set politics by the makers. He later revealed many dark secrets of the production house. He also confirmed that he would be paired up with choreographer Shweta Sharda for the reality show. On 6 November 2022, he was eliminated in the season's first double elimination, finishing in 10th place.

=== Progression to leading roles (2023–present) ===
From March 2023, he portrayed Rajveer Arora alias Rudraksh Luthra opposite Sana Sayyad and later on opposite Adrija Roy in Zee TV's Kundali Bhagya until the show got off air in December 2024. From June 2025 he played Aditya Kashyap opposite Anchal Sahu post generation leap in Colors TV's Parineetii until the show went off-air in August 2025.

Kalnawat marked his return to OTT through sixth and seventh edition of MX Player's Campus Beats as Sumer alongside Shantanu Maheshwari and Shruti Sinha in April and July 2026.

Kalnawat is leading StarPlus's supernatural based drama Apsara as Shaurya Kapoor opposite Samiksha Jaiswal since October 2026, marking his return to the channel four years after the Anupamaa controversy.

== Filmography ==
=== Television ===
Year	Title	Role	Notes	Ref.
2017	Aye Zindagi	Dhruv	Episode 16	
2017–2018	Meri Durga	Sanjay Singh "SP/Prince" Ahlawat		
2018	Mariam Khan – Reporting Live	Rehaan Thakur		
2018	Kaun Hai?	Kunwar Ratan Pratap Singh Rathore	Episode: "The Heir of Dhawalgarh"	
2019	Laal Ishq	Kabir	Episode: "Khooni Wig"	
2019	Laal Ishq	Manu Mittal	Episode: "Mayavi Shev"	
2020–2022	Anupamaa	Samar Shah	Nominated– Gold Award for Best Actor in a Supporting Role	
2022	Jhalak Dikhhla Jaa 10	Contestant	10th place	
2023–2024	Kundali Bhagya	Rajveer "Rudraksh" Luthra		
2025	Parineetii	Aditya "Adi" Kashyap		
2026–present	Apsara	Shaurya Kapoor		

=== Web series ===
Year	Title	Role	Notes	Ref.
2019–2020	Dil Hi Toh Hai	Shivam "Shivi" Noon	Seasons 2–3	
2019	Ishq Aaj Kal	Faraz Sheikh		
2023	Butterflies	Neeraj	Season 4, Episode 3: "Kebab Mein Haddi"	
2025	Ek Tha Deewana	Armaan Malhotra		
2026	Campus Beats	Sumer	Season 6–7	

=== Audio series ===
Year	Title	Role	Notes	Ref.
2024	Secret Ameerzaada	Ahaan Raizada	Season 2	
2025	Super Yoddha	Prince Dhruv		

=== Music videos ===
Year	Title	Singer(s)	Ref.
2020	Tere Naal Rehna	Jeet Gannguli, Jyotica Tangri	
2021	Akhaa Vich	Sonu Kakkar	
2021	Ladki Star Hai	Himani Bairwa	
2021	Dil Nu Dildaar	Yasser Desai	
2021	Khumariyaan	Raj Barman, Samira Koppikar	
2021	Sun Yaara	Rahat Fateh Ali Khan	
2022	Tum Subah	Mohammad Danish, Sarodee Bora	
2022	Yaar Ki Mehfil	Stebin Ben	
2022	Humnashi	Palak Muchhal, Ashok Ojha	
2022	Baadal Barse	Yasser Desai	
2023	Zariya Tu	Romy	
2023	Gallan Mithiyan	Anmol Daniel	
2024	Imaan Tu	Ankit Tiwari	
2024	O Rangreza	Sonu Kakkar	
2024	Dheere Dheere	Payal Dev, Aditya Dev	
2024	Meethi Boliyaan	Javed Ali	
2024	Raataan Kaali	Sumedha Karmahe, Sultan Sulemani	
2025	Dhadke Ye Dil	Payal Dev, Ash King	
2025	Jab Se Chadhal Ba Jawani	Manoj Tiwari	
2026	Adiye Ni	Abdul Shaikh	
2026	Tera Naam	Payal Dev	

== Awards and nominations ==
Year	Award	Category	Work	Result	Ref.
2019	Likee Digital Awards	Digital Debut of the Year	Dil Hi Toh Hai	Won	
2021	International Iconic Awards	Best Beta of Indian Television	Anupamaa	Won	
2022	14th Gold Awards	Best Actor in a Supporting Role	Anupamaa	Nominated	
2022	14th Gold Awards	Most Stylish Actor	—N/a	Nominated	
2024	Zee Rishtey Awards	Best Bhai-Behen (with Baseer Ali)	Kundali Bhagya	Won	
