= PlanetRead =

- Type: Nonprofit organization
- Legal status: U.S. 501(c)(3); India 80(G)
- Purpose: Literacy
- Region served: India
- Services: Same Language Subtitling
- President: Brij Kothari
- Chief Operating Officer: Nirav Shah
- Website: planetread.org

PlanetRead is a non-profit founded by Ashoka Fellow, Brij Kothari, to provide Same Language Subtitling on Bollywood music videos in the same language that they are sung in to promote functional literacy. There are an estimated 650 million literate people in India. In reality, half the so-called ‘literates,’ more than 300 million people, can best be called ‘early-literate.’ They cannot read, for example, newspaper headlines.

== Same language subtitling ==
Same Language Subtitling (SLS) has been implemented on existing Bollywood film songs on TV, in 10 languages:

- Hindi
- Bengali
- Gujarati
- Marathi
- Telugu
- Tamil
- Kannada
- Malayalam
- Odia
- Punjabi

A Hindi song is shown with the lyrics subtitled in Hindi, Tamil songs with Tamil subtitles, and so on. What you hear is what you read. The subtitles are designed to change the color of every word in perfect timing with the song. SLS is cost-effective. On a Hindi program, one U.S. dollar gives reading practice to 5,000 people for one year.

IIM Ahmedabad and PlanetRead Trust have nationally implemented SLS in partnership with Doordarshan. Donors have included:

- All Children Reading (USAID)
- Google Foundation
- Sir Ratan Tata Trust
- Development Marketplace (World Bank)
- Dell Giving
- Department of School Education and Literacy, Ministry of Human Resource Development, Government of India

== Media coverage ==
PlanetRead has been featured by The Economist, The Boston Globe, The Huffington Post, The World Bank, and Extreme Tech. Former U.S. President Bill Clinton also spoke about the importance PlanetRead and Same Language Subtitling.

PlanetRead has conducted many studies demonstrating the positive impact of Same Language Subtitling. Their most recent study was in August 2015.

PlanetRead also has all their show times on their website.

== See also ==
- BookBox
- Literacy in India
