= Douglass North =

American economist and Nobel laureate (1920–2015)

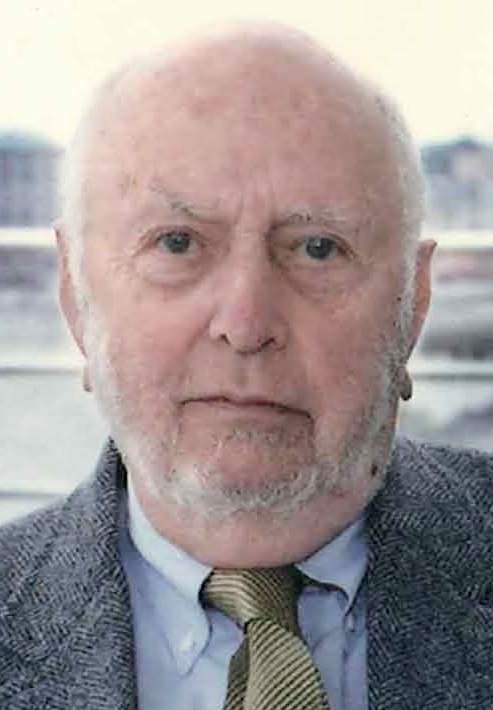
- North in 1997
- Born: November 5, 1920; Cambridge, Massachusetts, U.S.
- Died: November 23, 2015 (aged 95); Benzonia, Michigan, U.S.
- Spouses: Lois Heister (m. 1944; div. 1972) Elisabeth Case (m. 1972)
- Children: 3
- Awards: Nobel Memorial Prize in Economic Sciences (1993)

Academic background
- Education: University of California, Berkeley (B.A., Ph.D.)
- Thesis: The Large Life Insurance Companies Before 1906: A Study of Their Growth, Their Domination of the Industry, and Their Alliances With Investment Banking as Revealed by the Armstrong Investigation of 1905–1906 (1952)
- Doctoral advisor: Melvin M. Knight

Academic work
- School or tradition: New Institutional Economics
- Institutions: University of Washington; Rice University; Cambridge University; Washington University in St. Louis; Stanford University; Hoover Institution; US Merchant Marine Academy

Douglass Cecil North (November 5, 1920 – November 23, 2015) was an American economist known for his work in economic history. Along with Robert Fogel, he received the Nobel Memorial Prize in Economic Sciences in 1993. In the words of the Nobel Committee, North and Fogel "renewed research in economic history by applying economic theory and quantitative methods in order to explain economic and institutional change."

North helped popularize cliometrics and was later an influential figure in New Institutional Economics, which emphasizes the impact of institutions on economic behaviors and outcomes. North argued, "Institutions provide the incentive structure of an economy; as that structure evolves, it shapes the direction of economic change towards growth, stagnation, or decline." Rational and wealth-maximizing individuals lack complete information and have difficulties monitoring and enforcing agreements. Institutions can provide information and reduce transaction costs, thus encouraging economic activity.

== Early life and education ==
Douglass North was born in Cambridge, Massachusetts, on November 5, 1920. He moved several times as a child due to his father's work at MetLife. The family lived in Ottawa, Ontario, Canada, in Lausanne, Switzerland, in New York City, and in Wallingford, Connecticut.

North was educated at Ashbury College in Ottawa and the Choate School in Wallingford. He was accepted at Harvard at the same time that his father became the head of MetLife on the West Coast, so North chose instead to attend the University of California, Berkeley. During his time at Berkeley, North was a member of Chi Phi fraternity. In 1942, he graduated with a general B.A. in the humanities. Although his grades amounted to slightly better than a "C" average, he managed to complete a triple major in political science, philosophy and economics. That same year, he entered the US Merchant Marine Academy, graduated a year later and went to sea for three years as a deck officer.

A conscientious objector in World War II, North became a navigator in the Merchant Marine, traveling between San Francisco and Australia. During that time, he read economics and picked up his hobby of photography. He taught navigation at the Maritime Service Officers' School in Alameda during the last year of the war, and struggled with the decision of whether to become a photographer or an economist.

North returned to UC Berkeley, where he obtained a Ph.D. degree in economics in 1952 under the guidance of Melvin Moses Knight. He subsequently began his career as an assistant professor at the University of Washington.

== Academic career ==
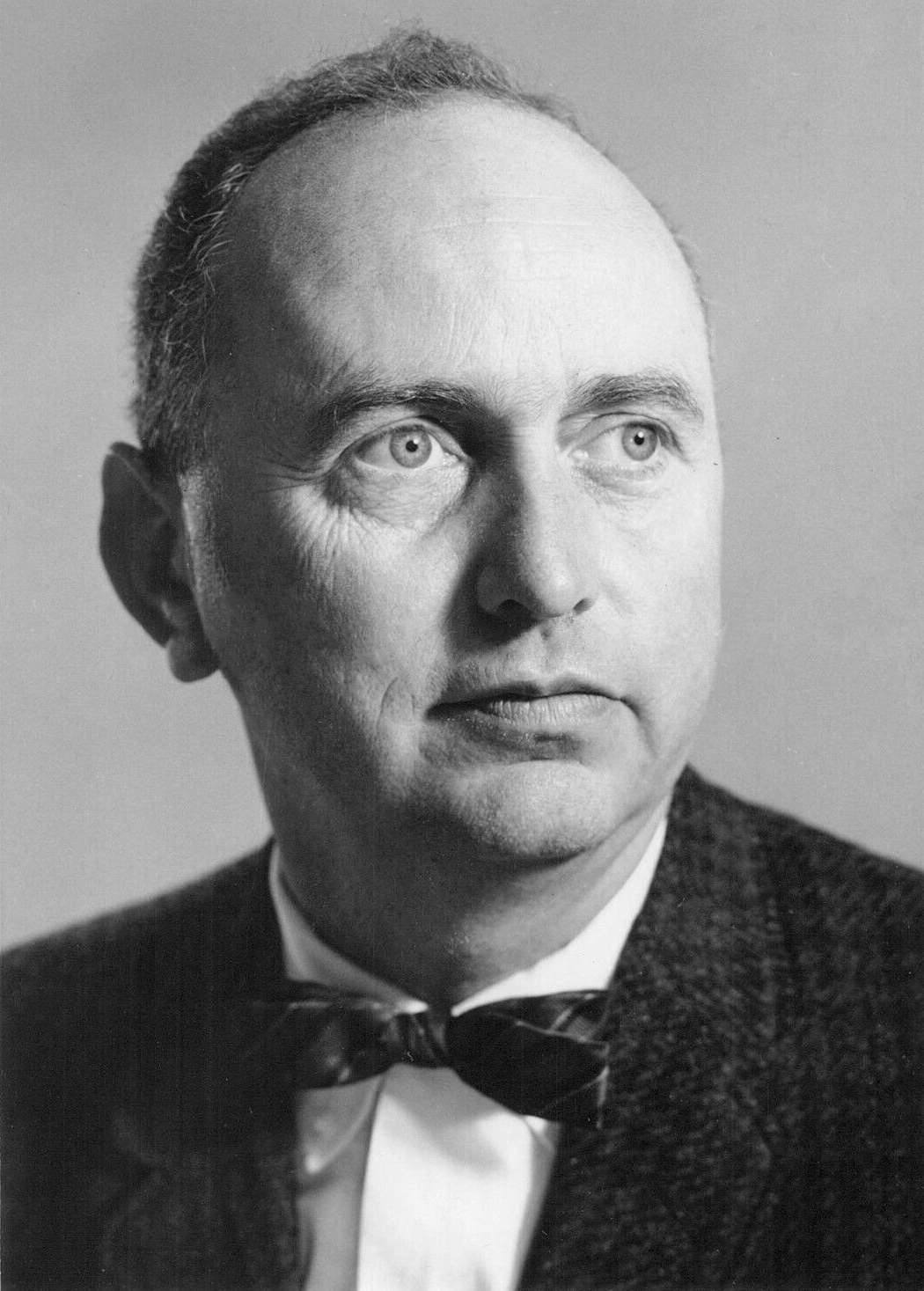
North in 1967

From 1951 to 1983, North taught economics at the University of Washington, where he was an assistant professor till 1956, an associate professor from 1956 to 1960, and a full professor till 1983; he also chaired the economics department at Washington from 1967 to 1979. In 1960, North became co-editor of the Journal of Economic History, where he helped popularise cliometrics. In 1979 he served as the Peterkin Professor of Political Economy at Rice University, and in 1981–82 as the Pitt Professor of American History and Institutions at Cambridge University, before joining the faculty of Washington University in St. Louis in 1983 as the Henry R. Luce Professor of Law and Liberty in the Department of Economics (where he also directed the Center for Political Economy from 1984 to 1990). He also served as the Bartlett Burnap Senior Fellow at the Hoover Institution at Stanford University.

In 1991, he became the first economic historian to win the John R. Commons Award, which was established by the International Honors Society for Economics in 1965.

A collection of North's papers is housed at the Rubenstein Library at Duke University.

== Research agenda ==
Along with Ronald Coase and Oliver Williamson, he helped found the International Society for the New Institutional Economics (ISNIE) which held its first meeting in St. Louis in 1997. His research included property rights, transaction costs, the institutional basis of markets, and economic organization in history as well as economic development in developing countries.

North served as an expert for the Copenhagen Consensus and as an advisor to governments around the world. He was engaged in research (with John J. Wallis of the University of Maryland and Barry Weingast of Stanford University) on how countries emerge from what they call "the natural state" and into long-run economic growth. He was a trustee of Economists for Peace and Security, and a special adviser to the non-profit organization Vipani.

== Publications ==
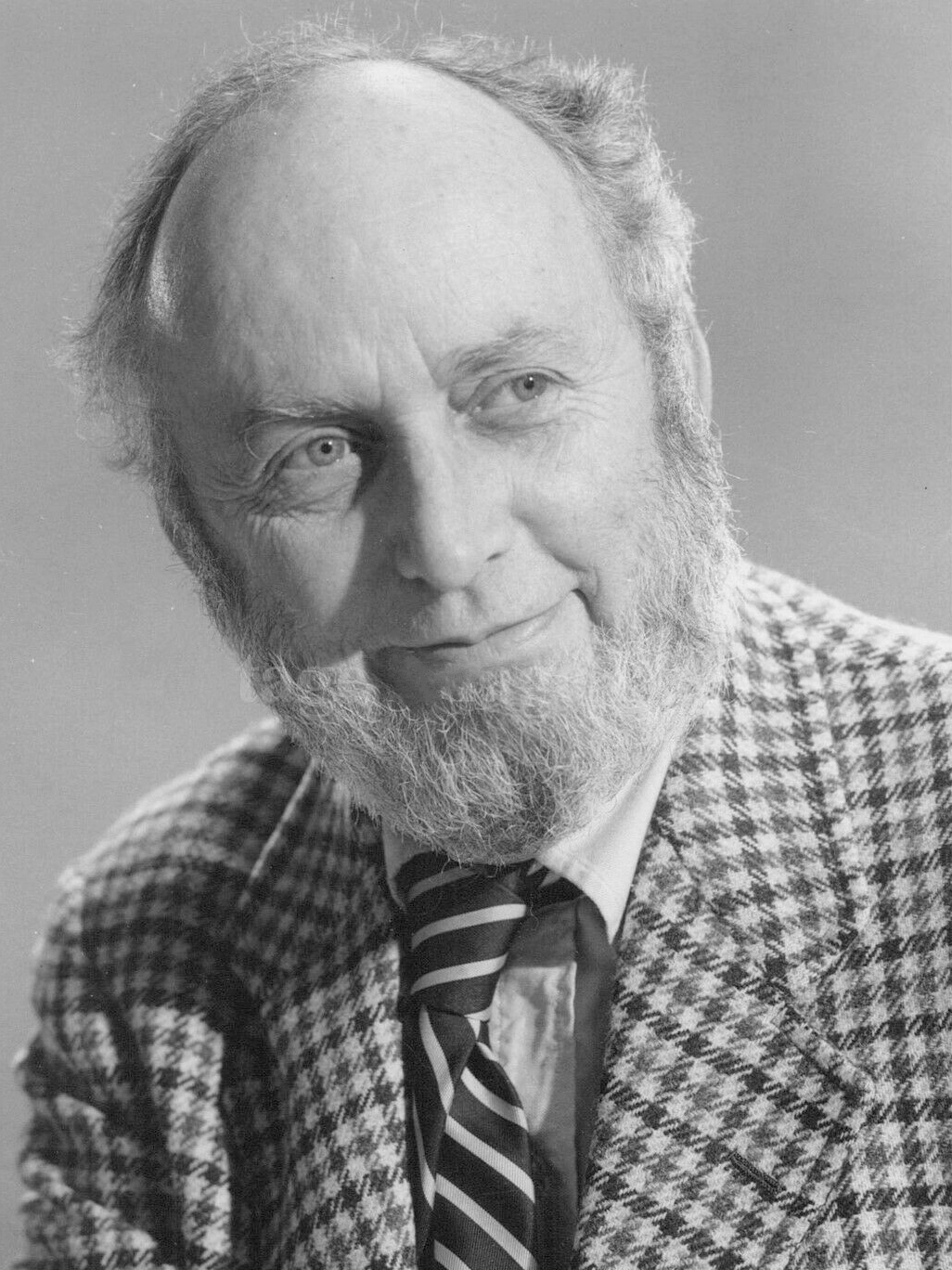
North in 1979

=== Institutions ===
In 1991 Douglass North published a paper, titled Institutions, in the Journal of Economic Perspectives. This paper summarized much of his earlier research relating to economic and institutional change. North defines institutions as "humanly devised constraints that structure political, economic and social interactions". Constraints, as North describes, are devised as formal rules (constitutions, laws, property rights) and informal restraints (sanctions, taboos, customs, traditions, codes of conduct), which usually contribute to the perpetuation of order and safety within a market or society. The degree to which they are effective is subject to varying circumstances, such as a government's limited coercive force, a lack of organized state, or the presence of strong religious precept.

North defined institutions as the "rules of the game" that structure human interaction, distinguishing between formal institutions such as laws, constitutions, and property rights, and informal institutions such as social norms and cultural practices. These institutions shape the incentives faced by individuals and organizations, influencing economic behavior and long-term outcomes. North argued that effective institutions reduce transaction costs by creating stability and predictability, allowing markets to function more efficiently. He also emphasized that institutions are not always efficient and may persist even when they hinder economic growth due to historical constraints and political incentives. This idea is related to path dependence, in which past institutional choices limit future possibilities and can lead to the persistence of suboptimal systems. North's framework has been widely applied in development economics to explain differences in economic performances across countries. These ideas provide the foundation for North's analysis of how societies evolve economically over time.

Section 2 of North's 1991 paper describes the economic development of societies as occurring in stages:

North begins with local exchange within the village. In this setting, specialization "is rudimentary and self-sufficiency characterizes most individual households", with small-scale village trade existing within dense social networks of informal constraints that facilitate local exchange, and a relatively low transaction cost. However, this confined market reduces the potential of specialization and increases production costs. In this close-knit network "people have an intimate understanding of each other, and the threat of violence is a continuous force for preserving order ..."

With growth, the market extends beyond the village into larger, interconnected regions. As the participants of a transaction become more socially distant, the terms of exchange must be made more explicit. This increase in transaction costs necessitates institutions that reduce the risks of being cheated, either by raising "the benefits of cooperative solutions or the costs of defection". With increased specialization, production costs are reduced and can justify higher transaction costs.

As long-distance trade becomes more feasible, generally through caravans or lengthy ship voyages, individuals and groups experience occupational and geographic specialization. Society also experiences a rise of formal trading centers (temporary gathering places, towns or cities). From the development of long-distance trade arise two transactional cost problems.

The first transactional cost problem is agency: the transfer of one's goods or services outside the control of local rule leaves the rules of exchange undefined, the risk of unfair trade high, and the contracts within society unenforced. For this reason, sedentary merchants often would send their kin with the product to ensure its safe arrival and the fulfillment of agreed terms of exchange by the receiving party.

The second transactional cost problem is the enforcement of contracts. Historically this problem was met with either armed forces protecting ships or caravans, or use of tolls by local coercive groups. However, in modern societies, institutions acting cooperatively in the interest of free market trade provide protection for goods and enforcement of contracts. Negotiation and enforcement in alien parts of the world require the development of a standardized system of weights and measures.

As development continues, the rise of capital markets (and the protection of associated property rights), creates social capital and enables citizens to gain wealth. Technology plays an instrumental role in the continued development of manufacturing sectors, and acts to lower transaction costs in several ways. The most substantial benefits are generally the result of transportation improvements.

Eventually, society becomes overwhelmingly urban. This final stage of development specialization requires increasing percentages of the resources of the society to be active in the market so that the transaction sector becomes a large share of gross national product. Highly specialized forms of transaction organizations emerge at this stage. Globalized specialization and division of labor demand institutions to ensure property rights even when trading in neighboring countries enabling capital markets to develop "with credible commitment on the part of the players."

North enumerates three primitive types of exchange:

- Tribal Society, which "relies on a dense social network".(Colson 1974, p. 59)
- Bazaars, which have "high measurement costs; continuous effort at clientization; intensive bargaining at every margin"
- Long-distance caravan trade illustrates the informal constraints that made trade possible in a world where protection was essential and no organized state existed.

All three methods above are found to be much less likely to evolve than large urban societies.

North's paper concludes with a few intriguing questions which his paper aimed to address:

- What is it about informal constraints that give them such a pervasive influence upon the long-run character of economies?
- What is the relationship between formal and informal constraints?
- How does an economy develop the informal constraints that make individuals constrain their behavior so that they make political and judicial systems effective forces for third party enforcement?

=== Transaction Costs, Institutions, and Economic Performance ===
In a 1992 paper, North argues that neoclassical economic theory overlooks the institutions required to create efficient markets with low monitoring and transaction costs. He develops a framework for explaining how institutions change and become more efficient over time.

North theorizes that all transaction costs are rooted in information asymmetries between the parties to an exchange. Hence, each person must expend resources ascertaining the qualities of the good she is buying and enforcing the terms of the trade. Because these costs pose such a large barrier to economic growth, a central function of political and economic institutions is to control them, often by disincentivizing fraud, theft, and other socially detrimental behaviors. Yet those who command the political system will structure these institutions to maximize their personal benefit, rather than the social benefit, so transaction costs will not always be minimized by existing institutions.

Importantly for North, individuals and organizations make their decisions on the basis of imperfect ideologies, which are "mental models" for how the world functions. Therefore, the politicians who craft institutions will, despite their best efforts, occasionally fail to maximize their personal gain. When this happens, entrepreneurs who believe that institutional changes will significantly benefit them will enter the political realm to effect this change. The result is incremental institutional change, pushed forward by self-seeking individuals.

North argues that this change will usually be slow for two reasons. First, the powerful actors in control of the political systems made the institutions for their benefit and so will be reluctant to change them, resulting in path dependence. Second, informal institutions—like social customs and cultural practices—are by their nature slow to change, yet play a role in determining transaction costs.

North goes on to apply this framework to analyze a few historical examples, including the Green Revolution, the American Revolution, and imperial Spain, as well as to offer some general policy recommendations.

=== Violence and the Rise of Open-Access Orders ===
In Violence and the Rise of Open-Access Orders, North, Wallis, and Weingast integrate a theory of politics with a theory of economics to explain the institutions, i.e. the rules governing behavior, that develop in human societies. In their view, the primary task of any set of institutions is to limit violence among individuals. They focus on two sets of institutions—which they call social orders—that accomplish this task, but which also have different effects on economic growth.

The first set of institutions are called "limited access orders," and they are characterized by elite control of the political and economic systems to extract rents. Violence is limited because the most powerful actors maintain law and order to protect their rents. However, their means of maintaining law and order require supporting economic and political monopolies, which stunt economic growth.

The second set of institutions that North et al. propose are called "open access orders," and they limit violence through a politically controlled military. These societies allow anyone who meets some impersonal criteria to form political and economic organizations, resulting in a Schumpeterian process of "creative destruction." The military limits societal violence, and the political actors that control this military are themselves constrained by the constant competition for political and economic power that this process of creative destruction entails. Unlike limited access orders, open access orders stimulate economic growth since solutions to economic and political challenges can come from any individual in society, rather than a select few.

North et al. argue that modern open access orders emerged from limited access orders through a two-step process: first, the application of impersonal laws to elites and the consolidation of military power, and second, the extension of elite privileges to the rest of society. They apply this theory to explain the legitimacy of elections within different societies and to explain why economic growth is more consistent in modern open access orders than it is in limited access orders.

== Personal life ==
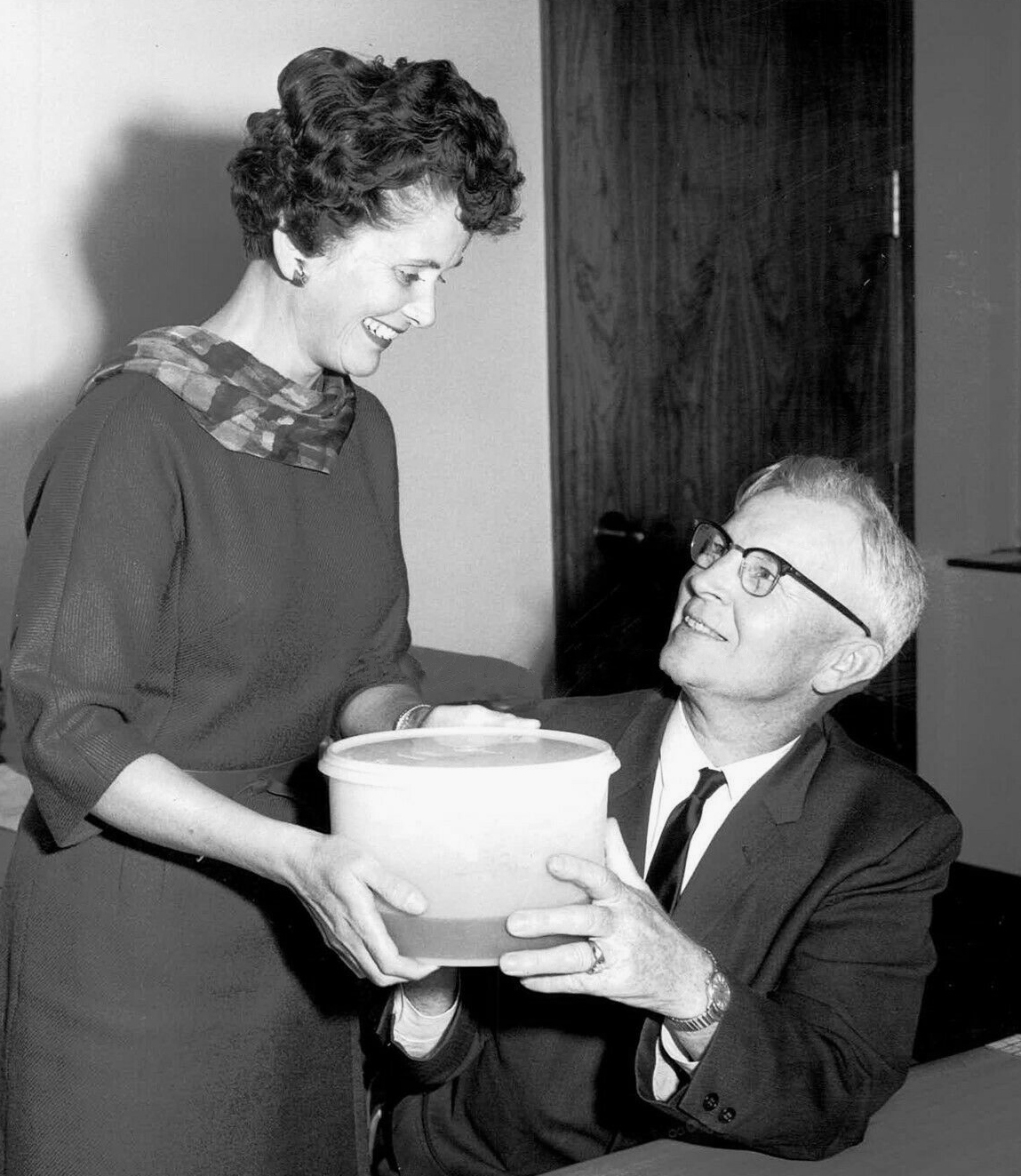
North and Heister in 1963

North was married twice. His first marriage was to Lois Heister on June 29, 1944 with whom he had three sons: Douglass Jr., Christopher and Malcolm. During the marriage, Heister became a notable activist and politician. The marriage ended in divorce in 1972. North remarried in the same year, to Elisabeth Case.

== Death and legacy ==
North died on November 23, 2015, at his summer home in Benzonia, Michigan from esophageal cancer at the age of 95.

As a Nobel laureate, North's reputation extended both from his own university environment to the international influences made by his research and writing. North's research in New Economic History has included such notable economists and historians as Jonathan Hughes, Richard Sutch, Lloyd Mercer, Jim Sheperd, Donald Gordon, Gary Walton, Lance E. Davis, Robert Huttenback, Roger Ransom, Gaston Rimlinger, Terry L. Anderson, P.J. Hill, Philip Coelho, and David Knowles as recorded in the 60th Anniversary dedication volume in memory of North.

== Publications ==
North's other major publications include:

- North, Douglass (1991). "Institutions". Journal of Economic Perspectives. 5 (1): 97–112. doi:10.1257/jep.5.1.97.
- North, Douglass C. (1955). "Location Theory and Regional Economic Growth". Journal of Political Economy. 63 (3): 243–258. doi:10.1086/257668. JSTOR 1825076. S2CID 154428783.
- The Economic Growth of the United States, 1790–1860, Prentice Hall, 1961.
- North, Douglass C. (1965). "The State of Economic History". American Economic Review. 55 (1–2): 86–91. JSTOR 1816246.
- Institutional Change and American Economic Growth, Cambridge University Press, 1971 (with Lance Davis).
- North, Douglass Cecil; Thomas, Robert Paul (1973). The Rise of the Western World: A New Economic History. Cambridge, England: Cambridge University Press – via Internet Archive.
- Growth and Welfare in the American Past, Prentice-Hall, 1974.
- Structure and Change in Economic History. New York and London: W. W. Norton and Company. 1981. ISBN 039395241X..
- North, Douglass C. (1989). "Institutions and economic growth: An historical introduction". World Development. 17 (9): 1319–1332. Bibcode:1989WoDev..17.1319N. doi:10.1016/0305-750X(89)90075-2.
- Constitutions and Commitment: The Evolution of Institutions Governing Public Choice in Seventeenth-Century England, Cambridge University Press, 1989
- Institutions, Institutional Change and Economic Performance, Cambridge University Press, 1990 ISBN 0521397340.
- North, Douglass C. (1994). "Economic Performance through Time". American Economic Review. 84 (3): 359–68. JSTOR 2118057. Also published as Nobel Prize Lecture.
- Empirical Studies in Institutional Change, Cambridge University Press, 1996 (edited with Lee Alston & Thrainn Eggertsson) ISBN 0521557437.
- Understanding the Process of Economic Change, Princeton University Press, 2005 ISBN 0691145954.
- Violence and Social Orders: A Conceptual Framework for Interpreting Recorded Human History, Cambridge University Press, 2009 (with John Joseph Wallis and Barry R. Weingast) ISBN 1107646995.

Awards
Preceded by Gary S. Becker	Laureate of the Nobel Memorial Prize in Economics; 1993; Served alongside: Robert W. Fogel	Succeeded by John C. Harsanyi; John F. Nash Jr. Reinhard Selten
