= Kise Apna Kahein =

- Genre: Drama
- Written by: Armaan Shahabi
- Directed by: Inderjit Arora
- Starring: See below
- Theme music composer: Lalit Sen
- Opening theme: "Kise Apna Kahein" by Alka Yagnik and Roop Kumar Rathod
- Country of origin: India
- Original language: Hindi
- No. of seasons: 1

Production
- Producers: Saira Banu; Dilip Kumar
- Camera setup: Multi-camera
- Running time: 24 minutes
- Production company: Sharp Focus Productions

Original release
- Network: Sahara Manoranjan
- Release: 26 May 2003

Kise Apna Kahein is an Indian television series that aired on Sahara Manoranjan. The series premiered on 26 May 2003 and is produced by Saira Banu and Dilip Kumar's production house Sharp Focus Productions.

== Plot ==
The story revolves around the life of a wealthy and beautiful girl Noor, who dreams to marry a prince charming but unfortunately marries Arshad who does not care for her and her family at all, only caring for Noor's wealth.

== Cast ==
- Meenakshi Gupta/Reena Kapoor as Noor
- Harsh Khurana as Arshad
- Jiten Lalwani as Daanish
- Shashikala as Dadi
- Pooja Madan as Tasleem
- Bharat Kapoor as Ahmed
- Madhavi Chopra as Ariba
- Gunn Kansara
