= Ka Karoon Sajni Aaye Na Baalam =

"Ka Karoon Sajni Aye Na Baalam"

Single by Yesudas
- Genre: Thumri
- Length: 4:36

Ka Karoon Sajni Aye Na Baalam is a classical song of Hindustani classical music. It is a Thumri sung in the raaga, Sindh Bhairavi Thumri. It was popularised by legendary Hindustani vocalist, Bade Ghulam Ali Khan, Barkat Ali Khan, Bismillah Khan on shehnai (instrument), Pandit Ajoy Chakrabarty etc.

K. J. Yesudas recorded a version for the film Swami in 1977.

== Bollywood ==
K. J. Yesudas' version was part of the 1977 Hindi film Swami, under the music direction of Rajesh Roshan. The song picturized on the veteran actor Deeraj kumar as the main lead, opposite to the famous veteran actress Shabana Azmi, daughter of famous poet, Kaifi Azmi and wife of famous lyricist Javed Akhtar. Yesudas was also nominated for the 1978 Filmfare Award for Best Male Playback Singer for the song. This song of the film Swami is composed in raaga 'kirwani' which is a melakarta raaga but bringing in the flavour of bhairavi. Usually raaga "kirwani" is sung at night time and pictured at and on same mood. But the basic "Ka Karoon Sajni" thumri sung by Ustaad Bade Ghulam Ali Khan Sahab is composed in Bhairavi (Sindhi).

The song was recreated by Indian DJ Phoenyx and performed by singer Arijit Singh in Phoenyx's 2011 Album Phoenyx: Phase 1.

Sandhya Mukherjee covered the song in Bengali thumri as "Ki kori Sojoni Aasena Preetom." It was used in Bengali film Basanta Bahar (1969) for Basanta Choudhury.
