= Vipani =

Non-profit organization

Vipani is a non-profit nongovernmental organization aimed at reducing poverty among the rural poor. Vipani was founded by Dr. Thomas George as a fellow of the Stanford University Reuters Digital Vision Program and Rainer Arnhold Fellowships (2002–2004). According to the Vipani model, farmers "cannot access the essential ingredients to make farming profitable, such as know-how, credit, and competitive prices". Through the provision of these, Vipani "transforms small-scale farms into profitable enterprises in the marketplace.", by ensuring "fair play for small farmers." Vipani's board of directors and Advisors include Douglass North, the 1993 recipient of the Nobel Prize in Economics.
