= Khyati Mangla =

Indian television actress (born 1988)

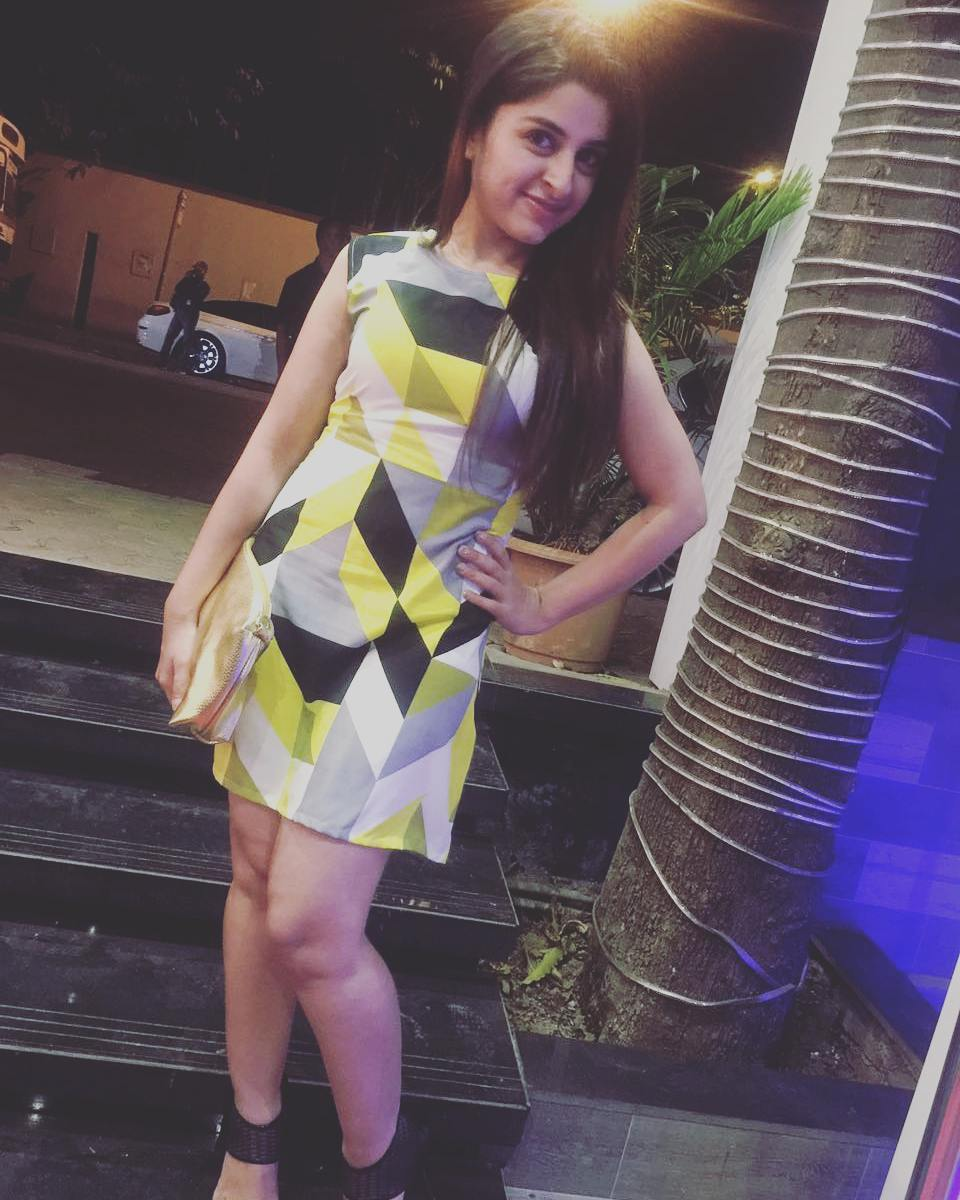
- Born: 22 September 1988 (age 37); Ranchi, India
- Occupations: Theatre Personality, Actress
- Years active: 2010–2017

Khyati Mangla (born 22 September 1988) is an Indian television actress who appeared in the Hindi television drama series, Neem Neem Shahad Shahad, in which she played the main character of Nirali.

== Early life ==
Khyati Mangla was born in Ranchi. She did her Std. XII in Arts stream from DAV Public School, Hehal Ranchi, Jharkhand in 2007.

== Career ==
She did TVC for Zee Marathi, Rasoi Magic Masala. She has also appeared in a music video for Asha Bhonsle and Ghulam Ali "Naina Re" in 2010. She attended on a scholarship the Kishore Namit Kapoor Acting Institute in 2009. She did acting training from Kishore Namit Kapoor Acting lab(KNK) Mumbai, Maharashtra. She got her first tele-serial Baat Hamari Pakki Hai which was aired on Sony Entertainment Television from 31 May 2010 to 25 February 2011. Then she did a promo for SAB TV with actor Gaurav Khanna. She got her second tele-serial Neem Neem Shahad Shahad which aired on Sahara One from 15 August 2011. In February 2014, Khyati acted in an episode of Bindass channel serial Yeh Hai Aashiqui along with Anurag Sharma.Parineeti Chopra and Sidharth Malhotra made an appearance in that episode.

== Television ==
- 2010–11 Baat Hamari Pakki Hai as Shreya
- 2011-12 Neem Neem Shahad Shahad as Nirali
- 2011 Tujh Sang Preet Lagai Sajna as Nirali
- 2014 Yeh Hai Aashiqui as Nikita
- 2015 Swaragini - Jodein Rishton Ke Sur as Uttara Ram Prasad Maheshwari
- 2017 Sankatmochan Mahabali Hanuman as Urmila
