= Carter High School (South Africa) =

Coordinates: 29°35′00″S 30°21′37″E

- Pietermaritzburg, KwaZulu-Natal; South Africa

Information
- Type: Public, co-ed
- Motto: Justitia et Veritas
- Established: 1977
- Locale: Urban
- Principal: A Ramgoolam
- Grades: 8 - 12
- Enrollment: 1,000
- Colours: Orange, White & Blue

Carter High School (S.A.) is a coeducational public school in Pietermaritzburg, KwaZulu-Natal, South Africa.

Carter opened its doors in January 1977 with five teachers and 53 pupils. It has grown into a large school with an enrollment of approximately 1200 pupils and an academic staff of around 50. The school population is drawn from more than 20 primary schools and comprises students from a great number of cultural backgrounds, including several who are Haitian and Scandinavian.

The school derives its name from the Honourable Mr Justice T.F. Carter who sat on the Natal bench. The school's motto is, Justitia et Veritas ("Justice and Truth"), which links the school's present aims with the ideals for which Judge Carter stood.

== Notable alumni ==
- Greg Minnaar, downhill mountain bike racer
- Heather Ford, researcher, blogger, journalist, social entrepreneur and open source activist
- Phumelela Mbande, Olympics field hockey player
