= Kahan Gaye Woh Log =

- Genre: Drama
- Written by: Ganga Prasad Mathur
- Directed by: Tarun Mathur
- Starring: see below
- Country of origin: India
- Original language: Hindi
- No. of seasons: 1

Production
- Producer: Dheeraj Kumar
- Camera setup: Multi-camera
- Running time: Approx. 25 minutes

Original release
- Network: DD National
- Release: 29 December 1985

Kahan Gaye Woh Log is an Indian television series that aired on DD National in 1985.

== Cast ==
- Dheeraj Kumar
- Sachin Kumar
- Rajendra Gupta

== Awards ==
- Aadhaarshila (Foundation) Award for Best Patriotic Serial given by then Vice President of India Mr. Shankar Dayal Sharma.
