= Shruti Sinha =

Indian television personality

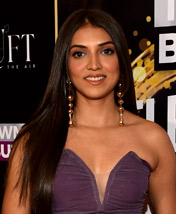
- Sinha in 2024
- Born: 28 March 1998 (age 28); Delhi, India
- Occupations: Television personality, actress, dancer
- Years active: 2015–present
- Known for: MTV Roadies Xtreme; Splitsvilla 11; Ace Of Space 2 Campus Beats

Shruti Sinha is an Indian actress and television personality known for winning the reality show MTV Splitsvilla 11 and participating in reality shows like Roadies Xtreme and Ace Of Space 2 in both of which she became a finalist.

== Career ==
Sinha started her career as a dancer in 2015 in Dance India Dance's fifth season, where she emerged as one of the top 15 contestants. Later, she featured in an episode of MTV India's show Love On The Run.

Sinha rose to fame when she participated in MTV Roadies Xtreme in 2018, where she finished as a semi-finalist. In 2019, she participated in season 11 of MTV Splitsvilla where she became the winner along with Gaurav Alugh. In the same year, she also participated in MTV's Ace of Space 2 and emerged as a finalist.

In 2021, Sinha was seen in Mumbai Saga's song "Shor Machega" sung by Yo Yo Honey Singh and Hommie Dilliwala.

In 2023, she starred in Amazon miniTV's series Campus Beats opposite Shantanu Maheshwari.

== Filmography ==
=== Television ===
Year	Title	Role	Notes	Ref.
2015	Dance India Dance 5	Contestant		
2016	MTV Love On The Run	Herself	Guest	
2017	MTV Roadies 16	Contestant	5th place	
2018	MTV Splitsvilla 11	Contestant	Winner	
2019	MTV Roadies 17	Host		
2019	Ace of Space 2	Contestant	3rd runner-up	
2023–2025	Campus Beats	Netra		

=== Films ===
Year	Title	Role	Notes	Ref.
2021	Mumbai Saga	—N/a	Special appearance in the song: "Shor Machega"	

=== Music videos ===
Year	Title	Singer	Ref.
2021	"Weekend Vibe"	Jubël, Desi Crew	
2025	"Laal Ferrari"	Amruta Fadnavis	
