= Tujh Sang Preet Lagai Sajna (2012 TV series) =

Indian drama television series

- Genre: Drama
- Developed by: Khushbu Yadav
- Written by: Priya Sudhir
- Directed by: Govind Singh
- Creative director: Diven Pawar
- Starring: See below
- Theme music composer: Manoj Santoshi
- Opening theme: "Tujh Sang Preet Lagai Sajna" by Madhushree
- Country of origin: India
- Original language: Hindi
- No. of seasons: 1
- No. of episodes: 330

Production
- Executive producer: Amit Kumar
- Producers: Dheeraj Kumar uby Kochhar
- Production location: Mumbai, Maharashtra
- Editors: Rochak Arora; Salestin Dsouza; Manoj D. Yadav
- Camera setup: Multi-camera
- Running time: Approx. 24 minutes
- Production company: Creative Eye Limited

Original release
- Network: Sahara One
- Release: 27 February 2012 – 7 June 2013

Tujh Sang Preet Lagai Sajna is an Indian television series that aired on Sahara One from 27 February 2012 to 7 June 2013.

== Plot ==
The story revolves around the lives of two sisters, Sonali and Nirali who together share a great bond and go to any extent to make each other happy but when it comes to marriage, their dreams are poles apart. The elder sister Sonali wishes to get married in a joint family with many family members around whereas the younger Nirali dislikes the thought of a joint family and wants to have a nuclear family living separately with her husband and kids. Soon after their wishes are fulfilled, as the girls are married in the same family and get the groom of their choice.

Sonali ties the knot with Deven and lives with her husband and his big family at their ancestral house in Rajpipala.

On the other side, Nirali is married to Deven's younger brother Chirag, who is a software engineer. She leaves for Mumbai with her husband to lead a separate life away from the burden of joint family, as she always wanted. Just when life is sailing smoothly, the story takes a twist, as Sonali has to move out of the house with her husband Deven to live separately whereas Nirali has to move from Mumbai as her husband loses his job because of the recession and they start to live with the joint family. The series explores the advantages and disadvantages of joint family vis-à-vis the nuclear family through the life of these two sisters.

== Cast ==
Current Storyline

- Binny Sharma ... Meera/Bijli
- Susheel Hinduja ... Aditya
- ... Sapna (Meera's friend)
- Dinesh Kaushik as Kedarnath Goenka (Aditya's father)
- Dolly Sohi as Geetanjali Kedarnath Goenka (Aditya's mother)
- Ranjan Sehgal ... Avinash Goenka (Aditya's brother)
- Usha Poudel ... Kajal (Avinash's wife)
- ... Keshav Bansal (Meera's father)
- Chitrapama Banerjee ... Sumitra Bansal (Meera's mother)
- Kalyani Thakkar ... Saavri Tai (matchmaker who brings Meera and Aditya together)
- ... Sambhav (Kedarnath's friend's son who works in Aditya's office and troubles Avinash after befriending with Avinash)
- Shweta Gautam as Shakuntala: Geetanjali's younger sister who is mentally unstable due to her husband, Pratap's torture who leaves her for someone else)
- Susheel Hinduja ... Pratap (Shaku's husband who resembles Aditya due to which Aditya never faces his aunt)
- ... Bhuaji (Kedarnath's elder sister, who joins hands with Kajal to trouble Aditya's family)

Past Storyline

- Shakti Anand as Chirag
- Khyati Mangla as Nirali/ Jalebi (Chirag's wife)
- Anas Khan as Deven (Sonali's husband)
- Lily Patel ... Baa
- Vijay Badlani ... Naren Kumar
