= Chitrahaar =

Television program

- Genre: Music
- Presented by: Vipin Handa
- Country of origin: India
- Original language: Hindi

Production
- Running time: 25 minutes (with commercials)
- Production company: Doordarshan

Original release
- Network: DD National
- Release: August 15, 1982 – present

Chitrahaar is a television program on DD National featuring song clips from Bollywood films. It was widely watched in the 1980s and 1990s. The word literally means 'a garland of pictures', or more liberally, 'a story of pictures'.

== History ==
Chitrahaar first aired in 1982. In 1997, Chitrahaar went back to private producers, with Chitrahaar going to Amit Khanna of Plus Channel.

In 2010, Chitrahaar started using same language subtitling (SLS), where Hindi subtitles of the song's lyrics scroll across the screen. The idea behind SLS is that people who are just learning to read would benefit by reading lyrics of the songs they are listening to and watching. It is an engaging way to promote literacy, especially in villages. This initiative of Doordarshan has been technically supported by the Indian Institute of Management, Ahmedabad.
