= A Suitable Boy (soundtrack) =

Soundtrack album by Alex Heffes, Anoushka Shankar and Kavita Seth
- Released: 23 October 2020
- Recorded: 2019–2020
- Genre: Soundtrack
- Length: 1:38:45
- Language: English, Hindi, Urdu
- Label: Silva Screen Records

A Suitable Boy (Original Television Soundtrack) is the soundtrack album to the British television drama miniseries A Suitable Boy directed by Mira Nair and Shimit Amin and adapted by Andrew Davies from Vikram Seth's 1993 novel of the same name, starring Tanya Maniktala, Tabu and Ishaan Khatter. The album featured original score composed by Alex Heffes and Anoushka Shankar, and ghazals by Kavita Seth. The album was released through Silva Screen Records on 23 October 2020.

== Development ==
The music for A Suitable Boy featured original score created by British musician Alex Heffes who reunited with Nair after Queen of Katwe (2016) along with sitarist Anoushka Shankar, as well as ghazals composed and performed by Kavita Seth, who voiced Saeeda Bai's character. Shankar was initially chosen as the sole composer as Nair felt her music suited the ambience of the story and wanted a strong Indian sound with global sensibilities. Though she was impressed on her role, she was hesitant to be available as she was touring at that time, which interrupted due to the COVID-19 pandemic. Later, Heffes joined the team as per Nair's suggestions. Both composers had to find the diversity of the cultures and the musical genres, and took time to utilize the different instruments and sound palettes that would work for the characters.

Nair approached Seth after listening to her album Main Kavita Hoon and discussed about, the type of ghazals they wanted and the situations the songs had to be placed. Seth added that Nair had a clarity on the music, regarding her requirements and the emotional aspects for the music, which made it easier to work with while adding that she elaborated on the setting and ambience of the 1950s. Seth had composed and pre-recorded the tunes which would be used for rehearsals as the songs had to be recorded live. Seth focused on tunes based on classical ragas following the period music structure. She had composed, designed and recorded those songs within 3–4 days, due to the live recording sessions, as normally it would take two weeks. Kavita sang most of the ghazals for Tabu's character, with retaining the songs in order to cater the international audiences as well.

As much of the songs were recorded live, it was efficient for Heffes and Shankar to integrate the songs into the score, but the incorporation of Indian musical elements were a logistical challenge. The theme for Latha was focused on sitar, to which Shankar wrote a melody that Heffes orchestrated it. Together, Heffes worked on the orchestral pieces while Shankar wrote melodies on top of it. Due to the pandemic restrictions much of the composition and recording process had to be supervised virtually. They recorded bansuri, flute, violin, tabla and other Indian instruments which were done by musicians remotely through Zoom call at various time zones. The orchestral pieces were recorded in Budapest. For the opening credits, they composed a tune on the swarna raga created by her father Ravi Shankar for the 50th Independence Day in 1996 which suited the mood and context they wanted to achieve. The series' supporting actor Namit Das also composed few songs for the series, marking his debut in composition. Other featuring composers included Namit's brother Yamini Das, Ustaad Shujaat Khan, Rhys Sebastian.

== Release ==
The soundtrack album featuring 45 songs was released on 23 October 2020 in digital and physical formats.

== Reception ==
Aseem Chhabra of Rediff.com said the characters' lives are "beautifully accompanied by ghazals sung by Kavita Seth, the score composed by Alex Heffes and melodious sitar pieces played by Anoushka Shankar." Tanul Thakur of The Wire wrote "The background score (by Alex Heffes and Anoushka Shankar), filled with prominent sitar strains, conveys the feeling of an exotic foreign documentary, where you expect to see snake charmers, yogis, and spices any minute." Devansh Sharma of Firstpost wrote "Alex Heffes’ music and Anoushka Shankar’s sprightly sitar, accompanied by Kavita Seth’s unblemished vocals, do not allow the viewer to only appreciate the peripherals."

Stutee Ghosh of The Quint wrote "the exquisite music by Alex Heffes and Anoushaka Shankar, making the proceedings richer". Susannah Butter of London Evening Standard wrote "The music adds to the romanticised vision — heavy on the sitars with a jaunty theme tune." Fenil Seta of Bollywood Hungama called it as one of the best theme songs of web series in 2020, adding "though it has a strong Indian sound; it also has the global sensibility" while praising the use of sitar which "enhances the charm and appeal and also goes well with the 1950s era shown in the series."

== Track listing ==
Disc 1
No.	Title	Singer(s)	Length
1.	"Prologue"	Alex Heffes, Anoushka Shankar	0:53
2.	"Lata's Theme"	Alex Heffes, Anoushka Shankar	2:30
3.	"Your Sister; My Brother"	Alex Heffes, Anoushka Shankar	1:25
4.	"You Too Will Marry a Boy I Choose"	Alex Heffes, Anoushka Shankar	1:34
5.	"Lutf Woh Ishq Mein"	Kavita Seth	4:02
6.	"Mehfil Barkhaast Hui"	Kavita Seth	3:00
7.	"Smitten Kitten" (Meenakshi's Theme)	Alex Heffes, Anoushka Shankar	1:44
8.	"Holi"	Alex Heffes, Anoushka Shankar	1:23
9.	"Quedgevelim Sunset"	Bombay Brass, Rhys Sebastian	2:06
10.	"No Time, Lover or Friend"	Alex Heffes, Anoushka Shankar	2:51
11.	"Raaq Khamaaj"	Ustaad Shujaat Khan	3:30
12.	"There is No Harm in Dawn"	Alex Heffes, Anoushka Shankar	1:18
13.	"The Floating Temple"	Namit Das, Yamini Das, Alex Heffes, Anoushka Shankar	1:34
14.	"Pillow Talk"	Alex Heffes	0:42
15.	"Let's Go Away / I Never Want to See You Again"	Alex Heffes, Anoushka Shankar	2:04
16.	"Na-Rawa Kahiye"	Kavita Seth	6:48
17.	"What Happened & Maan Delirium"	Alex Heffes, Anoushka Shankar	1:55
18.	"Muddat Hui Hai"	Kavita Seth	3:15
19.	"Kabir's Letter"	Alex Heffes, Anoushka Shankar	1:09
20.	"Unsuitable Tango"	Alex Heffes	0:57

Disc 2
No.	Title	Singer(s)	Length
1.	"The Railway Theme"	Alex Heffes, Anoushka Shankar	2:41
2.	"One Loves You"	Alex Heffes	1:51
3.	"Your Parakeet is Well?"	Alex Heffes	1:41
4.	"Are You Making Fun of Me?"	Alex Heffes, Anoushka Shankar	0:53
5.	"Farewell to Rasheed"	Alex Heffes	1:21
6.	"Are You a Lipstick Girl?"	Alex Heffes, Anoushka Shankar	2:46
7.	"Are We French Now?"	Alex Heffes, Anoushka Shankar	1:44
8.	"Dil-E-Nadaan"	Kavita Seth	6:22
9.	"Make Lata Love Me"	Alex Heffes, Anoushka Shankar	1:34
10.	"I Can Make Any Shoe"	Alex Heffes, Anoushka Shankar	1:19
11.	"Think Beyond Your Friends"	Alex Heffes	1:53
12.	"Fluke of a Catch"	Alex Heffes	1:50
13.	"Christmas in Prahapore"	Alex Heffes	0:48
14.	"Free India's First Election"	Alex Heffes	1:07
15.	"Raag Jhinjoti"	Ustaad Shujaat Khan	3:14
16.	"Raag Lalit"	Anoushka Shankar	1:37
17.	"Maan in Turmoil"	Alex Heffes, Kavita Seth	1:39
18.	"Loss"	Alex Heffes	2:48
19.	"The Fever Bird"	Alex Heffes	1:39
20.	"Maan in Prison"	Alex Heffes, Anoushka Shankar	2:10
21.	"An Unfortunate Accident"	Alex Heffes	2:18
22.	"Love Has Run Its Course" (Mehfil Barkhaast Hui Duet)	Kavita Seth, Sharvari Deshpande	1:36
23.	"A Suitable Boy"	Alex Heffes, Anoushka Shankar	1:58
24.	"Lata Chooses her Suitable Boy"	Alex Heffes, Anoushka Shankar	3:02
25.	"Monkey Wisdom"	Alex Heffes, Anoushka Shankar	3:07

== Personnel credits ==
Credits adapted from liner notes:

- Score composers – Alex Heffes, Anoushka Shankar
- Song composers – Kavita Seth, Namit Das
- Engineer – Gabor Buczko, Neil Stemp
- Recording – Jonnie Berlevy
- Protools recordist – David Lukacs
- Mixing – Rupert Coulson
- Mastering – Rick Clark
- Music supervisor – Ankur Tewari
- Score coordinator – Hilary Skewes
- Executive producer – David Stoner, Reynold D'Silva
- Management – James Borrer
- Artwork – Momoco, Thao Nguyen Phan
- Design and layout – Stuart Ford

Orchestra

- Orchestra – The Budapest Art Orchestra
- Orchestrators – Rebecca Dale
- Conductor – Peter Pejtsik
- Contractor – Hilary Skewes, Jenny Plant, Miklos Lukacs, Peter Rotter

Instruments

- Bansuri – Ashwin Srinivasan, Praveen Prathapan
- Duduk – Pedro Eustache
- Electronic wind instrument – Steve Tavaglione
- Esraj – Arshad Khan
- Ghatam, mridangam, morsing – Pirashanna Thevarajah
- Guitar, bass, percussion – George Doering
- Percussion – Sanket Naik
- Sitar – Anoushka Shankar
- Tabla – Gurdain Rayatt
- Tanpura – Balu Raguraman
- Violin – Manas Kumar, Philippe Honoré

== Accolades ==
Award	Date of ceremony	Category	Nominee	Result	Ref.
Ivor Novello Awards	21 September 2021	Best Television Soundtrack	Alex Heffes and Anoushka Shankar	Nominated	
Royal Television Society Craft & Design Awards	23 November 2020	Music – Original Title	Alex Heffes and Anoushka Shankar	Won	
