= Rachel Ann Mullins =

American model, actress, and producer

- Occupations: Model, actress, writer, producer
- Modeling information
- Height: 1.75 m (5 ft 9 in)
- Hair color: Brown
- Eye color: Hazel
- Website: www.rachelannmullins.com

Rachel Ann Mullins is an American model, actress, and producer, born in Detroit, Michigan. Mullins was uncredited for her role as Sam on ABC's Happy Endings (2012).

Mullins has acted in several television shows, including The Finder (2012), Don't Trust the B— in Apartment 23 (2013), Sequestered (2014), CSI: NY (2011), Secret Lives of Women (2009) and as Debbie on Betas (2013). She has also appeared in numerous films, including Entourage (2015).

== Filmography ==
=== Film ===
Year	Title	Role	Notes
2007	Homo Erectus	Cavewoman	Uncredited
2009	Good Guys Finish Last	Montage Girl	
2011	Poolboy: Drowning Out the Fury	Lobster Girl	
2011	Rampart	Dominatrix	Uncredited
2012	Excision	Zombie	Uncredited
2012	Last Call	Stripper #1	
2013	Her	Giselle	Uncredited
2014	Neighbors	Delta Psi Beta Little Sister	Uncredited
2014	The Coed and the Zombie Stoner	Becky	Uncredited
2014	Swelter	Stripper	
2014	Some Kind of Beautiful	Smokey	Uncredited
2015	Entourage	Sushi Girl	
2015	Dude Bro Party Massacre III	Frizzy	
2017	Two Faced	Margo	
2018	Lawless Range	Melody	Uncredited
2020	Attack of the Unknown	Nurse #2	
2023	Pathaan	Alice	Indian film

=== Television ===
Year	Title	Role	Notes
2008	Numbers	Racheal	2 episodes
2009	Descontrol	Dancer	3 episodes
2009	Secret Lives of Women	Model Shopper	Episode: "Shopping Addicts"
2010	Entourage	John Stamos's Cheerleader	Episode: "Tequila Sunrise"
2010	90210	Porn Star	Episode: "Mother Dearest"
2011	CSI: Miami	Tandy's Girl	Episode: "Match Made in Hell"
2011	CSI: NY	Licking Girl	Episode: "Holding Cell"
2012	The Finder	Waitress	Episode: "Swing and a Miss"
2012	The Ropes	Model	Episode: "Interrogation"
2012	Happy Endings	Sam	Episode: "More Like Stanksgiving"
2012	Wedding Band	Dancer	Episode: "Don't Forget About Me"
2013	Betas	Debbie	Episode: "Pilot"
2013	Don't Trust the B— in Apartment 23	Jacket Thief	Episode: "Teddy Trouble..."
2013	The League	Lourdes	Episode: "Rafi and Dirty Randy"
2015	Falling Tower Comedy	Michelle	Episode: "Tinder Success Stories"
2021	Chutzpah	Jeliene Scott	2 episodes
