= Desi Hoppers =

Indian hip-hop dance crew

- Origin: Mumbai, India
- Genres: Hip hop, Bollywood, Popping, House dance, Dancehall, krump
- Years active: 2015–present
- Members: Shantanu Maheshwari; Niraj Lama; Macedon D'Mello; Subhash Naidu; Rohan Vyas; Mohit Antony; Nimit Kotian; Viraj Pandya

Desi Hoppers (also known as Desi Hoppers Dance Crew) is a hip-hop dance crew from Mumbai, India. Desi Hoppers were formed in 2015, with originally seven members. In their debut year, Desi Hoppers won the World of Dance Championships in Los Angeles. The crew created history by being the first Indian dance team representing the country in World of Dance (WOD) and later emerging as winners. The journey of their formation and subsequent win was filmed as part of a finite television dance series called "Bindass Naach" on bindass channel. The crew was invited to give special performances on America's Got Talent (season 11) and Day Day Up. They are the only Indian crew to showcase an exhibition performance in World of Dance 2017.

== Work ==
Desi Hoppers was founded in 2015 by Palki Malhotra along with Shantanu Maheshwari, Macedon D'Mello, and Nimit Kotian through India-wide auditions, for the finite dance series Bindass Naach. The show aimed to showcase the journey and struggles of forming a dance crew and performing at an international level. The show had appearances by the likes of Jaja Vaňková of So You Think You Can Dance and Step Up: All In fame, along with Indian choreographer and dance guru Terence Lewis.

In an interview, Palki Malhotra revealed that the idea for the crew evolved during the days of Channel V's fiction dance show Dil Dosti Dance, where the four founding members had worked together. She added that their shared vision led to her helping them translate the crew into reality.

After their victory at World of Dance 2015, the crew was invited to give a special performance on America's Got Talent (season 11) and received praise from judges Simon Cowell, Heidi Klum, and Nick Cannon. They further gave a special performance on the hit Chinese show Day Day Up on Hunan Television. In 2016, they were featured in special promotional videos by NBC for World of Dance.

Desi Hoppers were also invited as guest performers in the World of Dance finals 2017 in Los Angeles to showcase their performance. In August 2017, Desi Hoppers participated in the Asian Battleground - a cross-national dance competition held in Malaysia and ended at the third place.

Since 2016, the crew has been conducting 'StreetMation' workshops across India, incorporating Indian cultural elements with street dance forms, majorly, Hip-Hop.

In 2018, Desi Hoppers participated in the world's biggest dance reality show World of Dance, and in doing so they became the first ever Indian dance crew to represent India on such a big platform. They received high praise from judges Jennifer Lopez, Ne-Yo, and Derek Hough who loved their unique style and fusion of hip-hop with Indian culture. They also scored an impressive 96 to qualify for the next round which was also the highest score in round one. In the Duals round, they managed to impress the judges again and won the round with a score of 90.3 defeating the opponent team from Upper Team Division, Opus Dance Collective who scored 83.3. The crew got eliminated in the cuts round though they scored a 90.7.

They were invited for special showcase performances at the highly popular YouTube Fanfest 2018 Brandcast held in Mumbai and also at India's Biggest Hip-hop Dance Festival "Breezer Vivid Shuffle", where they were a part of the International Judging jury alongside Jaja Vankova for crew showcase competition.

== Filmography ==
2015	Bindass Naach	Finite television series	Bindass
2016	Day Day Up	Special Performance	Hunan Television
2016	America's Got Talent (season 11)	Special Performance	NBC
2016	World of Dance	Promotional Videos	NBC
2017	World of Dance	Exhibition Act	
2017	Asian Battleground - Malaysia	Reality Dance Show	Astro AEC
2018	World of Dance (season 2)	Reality Dance show	NBC
2018	Iconic India	Special feature	CNN

== Awards ==
Year	Award	Category	Work	Result
2015	World of Dance	World of Dance, World Finals 2015 Championship	Desi Hoppers	Won
