= Ishq In The Air =

- Promotional release poster
- Genre: Romance; Drama
- Written by: Akshay Jhunjhunwala; Ayush Sharma; Chiranjeevi Bajpai; Riya Poojary
- Directed by: Tanmai Rastogi
- Starring: Shantanu Maheshwari; Medha Rana
- Composer: Rajarshi Sanyal
- Country of origin: India
- Original language: Hindi
- No. of episodes: 5

Production
- Producers: Sameer Gogate; Deepali Handa
- Production locations: Indore; Mumbai
- Cinematography: Sayak Bhattacharya
- Editor: Manish Jaitly
- Camera setup: Multi-camera
- Running time: 32-37 mins
- Production company: BBC Studios

Original release
- Network: Amazon miniTV; MX Player
- Release: 20 September 2024

Ishq In The Air is an Indian Hindi-language romantic drama television series directed by Tanmai Rastogi and written by Akshay Jhunjhunwala, Ayush Sharma, Chiranjeevi Bajpai and Riya Poojary. Produced under BBC Studios, it stars Shantanu Maheshwari and Medha Rana. The series premiered on Amazon MX Player on 20 September 2024.

== Cast ==
- Shantanu Maheshwari as Naman
- Medha Rana as Kavya
- Vandana Joshi
- Brij Bhushan Shukla
- Abhishek Sharrma
- Sanjeev Vats
- Sanjay Motilal Gurbaxani

== Production ==
The series was announced on BBC Studios. The trailer of the series was released on 19 September 2024.

== Reception ==
Amit Bhatia of ABP News reviewed the series. Archika Khurana of The Times of India rated the series 3/5 stars.
