= Flames (Indian TV series) =

Indian coming-of-age web series

- Poster
- Genre: Romantic comedy Coming-of-age; Drama
- Written by: Kunal Aneja
- Directed by: Apoorv Singh Karki; Divyanshu Malhotra
- Starring: Ritvik Sahore; Tanya Maniktala
- Composers: Afroz Jahan; Tusshar Mallek; Arabinda Neog
- Country of origin: India
- Original language: Hindi
- No. of seasons: 4
- No. of episodes: 20

Production
- Producer: Arunabh Kumar
- Cinematography: Georgy John
- Editors: Neel Jadhav; Rishab Malhotra; Akshara Prabhakar

Original release
- Release: 5 January 2018 – present

Flames is a 2018 Indian Hindi-language coming-of-age romantic drama web series produced by The Viral Fever (TVF). It is named after the game of the same name. It is directed by Apoorv Singh Karki and Divyanshu Malhotra, and stars Ritvik Sahore and Tanya Maniktala in lead roles. Set in a tuition center in west Delhi, the story follows the lives of two students. Its first season premiered in 2018, while the second was released on 18 October 2019. The third season was dropped in October 2022. The fourth season was released on 21 December 2023.

== Episodes ==
Series	Episodes	Originally released
1	5	3 February 2018
2	5	17 October 2019
3	5	15 September 2022
4	5	20 December 2023

== Cast ==
- Ritvik Sahore as Rajat "Rajjo" Bakshi
- Tanya Maniktala as Ishita
- Sunakshi Grover as Anusha
- Shivam Kakar as Gaurav Pandey "Pandu"
- Deepesh Sumitra Jagdish as Pradeep Kaushal
- Neelu Dogra as Geeta Bakshi, Rajat's mother
- Purnendu Bhattacharya as Mr. Bakshi, Rajat's father
- Raj Sharma as Ishita's father
- Nikki Narulaa as Radha Kaushal, Pradeep's wife
- Sahil Verma as Abhijat Walia, Maths teacher

== Reception ==
Pragya Jha of ABP News stated "Flames season 3 is the right combination of friendship, passion, and emotions, highlighted by a lot of teenage problems."

A reviewer for The Times of India gave 3 stars and stated "Overall, Flames 3 has its heart in the right place, just like its predecessors. A few scenes stand out, particularly the heartfelt conversations between Rajjo and Ishita, making these five episodes (roughly 30 minutes) a perfect blend of friendship, romance, and emotions."

Ganesh Aaglave of Firstpost stated "On the whole, Flames season 3 will make you emotional, bring back nostalgic memories and leave a huge smile on your face at the end."

Moumita Bhattacharjee of Latestly gave season 3, a rating of 1.5 of 5 and stated "Sometimes a few series don't have enough material to stay as charming as ever. Flames season 3 is unfortunately going on the same path, despite its likeable set of actors."
