= Tanya Maniktala =

Indian actress (born 1997)

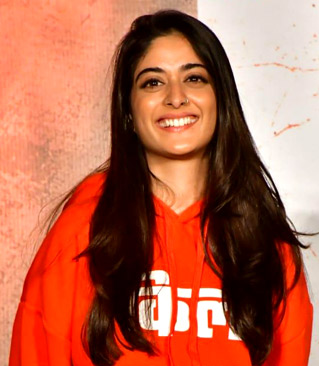
- Maniktala in 2024
- Born: 7 July 1997 (age 29); Delhi, India
- Education: Shivaji College, University of Delhi
- Occupation: Actress
- Years active: 2018–present

Tanya Maniktala (born 7 July 1997) is an Indian actress who works in Hindi films and TV and web-series. She became known for her leading roles in the series Flames (2018) and A Suitable Boy (2020). She has since featured in the action film Kill (2023).

== Early life ==
Maniktala was born on 7 July 1997 in Delhi in a Hindu family.

She graduated from Shivaji College, University of Delhi with a degree in English literature in 2018.

She also worked as a copywriter during her early career.

== Career ==
Maniktala made her acting debut in 2018 with School Days. The same year, Timeliner's Flames opposite Ritvik Sahore, became her first success and she received praises for her performance.

In 2020, she portrayed Lata Mehra in BBC One's A Suitable Boy alongside Ishaan Khattar, which proved as a major turning point in her career. She was asked by a friend to audition for a new production, unaware that the show involved was A Suitable Boy. She received praises from the critics for her performance.

In 2021, she appeared in Netflix's Feels Like Ishq opposite Skand Thakur and in Sony LIV's Chutzpah alongside Varun Sharma. She also appeared in Netflix's How To Fall In Love opposite Ayush Mehra.

Maniktala made her Hindi film debut with Mumbaikar alongside Vijay Sethupathi and Vikrant Massey. She also acted in Tooth Pari opposite Shantanu Maheshwari along with the web series P.I. Meena and Flames Season 3.

In 2024, Maniktala played Tulika in her second film, Kill opposite Lakshya. Praising her performance, Sukanya Verma noted, "Tanya's bright presence quickly achieves the beating heart as well as the gaping hole it leaves without slowing down Kill's reckless momentum."

== Filmography ==
=== Films ===
Key
†	Denotes films that have not yet been released

Year	Title	Role	Notes	Ref.
2023	Mumbaikar	Ishita		
2024	Kill	Tulika "Tuli" Singh		
2026	Raftaar †	TBA		
2027	Force 3 †	TBA		

=== Television ===
Year	Title	Role	Ref.
2018	School Days	Herself	
2018–present	Flames	Ishita	
2020	A Suitable Boy	Lata Mehra	
2021	Feels Like Ishq	Meher	
2021	Chutzpah	Sikha	
2022	How To Fall In Love	Tanya	
2023	Tooth Pari: When Love Bites	Rumi	
2023	P I Meena	Meena Iyer	
2024	The Pickle Factory	Mahika Khanna	
2025	Loot Kaand	Latika Mitra	

=== Music video appearances ===
Year	Title	Singer	Ref.
2025	"Palki Mein Hoke Sawaar - Take 2"	Asees Kaur, Shahid Mallya	
2025	"Kithe Vasde Ne"	Guru Randhawa	
2025	"Jaana Nahi"	Faheem Abdullah	

== Awards and nominations ==
Year	Award	Category	Work	Result	Ref.
2020	Toronto International Film Festival	Rising Stars Award	A Suitable Boy	Won	
