= Shantanu Maheshwari =

Indian actor, dancer, and choreographer

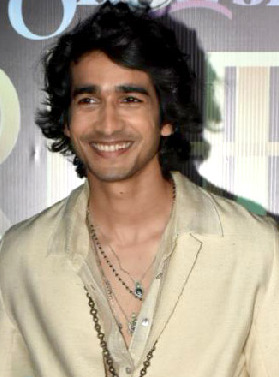
- Maheshwari in 2023
- Born: 7 March 1991 (age 35); Kolkata, West Bengal, India
- Education: H.R. College of Commerce and Economics
- Occupations: Actor; Dancer; Choreographer; Host
- Years active: 2011–present
- Known for: Dil Dosti Dance; World of Dance; Fear Factor: Khatron Ke Khiladi 8 Gangubai Kathiawadi
- Style: Dances – Hip Hop, Popping, Street Dance, Bollywood and Folk

Shantanu Maheshwari (born 7 March 1991) is an Indian actor, dancer, and choreographer. He gained fame for his debut role as Swayam Shekhawat in the popular youth television show Dil Dosti Dance. Shantanu's impressive dance skills earned him widespread recognition, leading to his victory in Fear Factor: Khatron Ke Khiladi 8. He has also represented India internationally as part of the Desi Hoppers dance crew, winning the World of Dance Championship in Los Angeles. Additionally, he made his Bollywood debut in Sanjay Leela Bhansali's Gangubai Kathiawadi (2022) which earned him the IIFA Award for Star Debut of the Year – Male.

== Early life ==
Shantanu Maheshwari was born on 7 March 1991 in Kolkata, India, into a Marwari family. He completed his early education at The Park English School and St. Joseph's College, Kolkata. For his higher education, he moved to Mumbai, where he attended H.R. College of Commerce and Economics. During his college years, Maheshwari became an active member of the Street Soul Dance Crew (SSDC). While he is a versatile dancer, he specialises in Popping and Liquid Waving, showcasing his unique skills across various platforms.

== Career ==
Maheshwari began his acting career with Dil Dosti Dance for Channel V. He rose to fame by essaying the role of Swayam Shekhawat during the four-years run of the show. His chemistry with co-star Vrushika Mehta earned him widespread adulation as they went on to win the third spot in the Hottest Indian TV Jodi list by the UK-based newspaper Eastern Eye. The duo also earned the ITA Award for Onscreen Couple of the Year in 2014.

In 2015, he appeared in Zing's episodic show Pyaar Tune Kya Kiya where he played the role of a cancer patient. He returned to the small screen with his Dil Dosti Dance co-star Vrushika Mehta in Yeh Hai Aashiqui on Bindass, playing an episodic character of a verbally-challenged law student. He also dubbed for some episodes of Yeh Hai Aashiqui. In 2015, Maheshwari appeared in the Bindass show Bindass Naach. The finite series, which had appearances by the likes of Jaja Vaňková and Terence Lewis, showcased the formation of his crew Desi Hoppers and their subsequent victory at World of Dance 2015. Desi Hoppers became the first dance crew in the history to represent India at World of Dance and win it too. The crew was invited to give a special performance on America's Got Talent 11 and received praise from the judges Simon Cowell, Heidi Klum and Nick Cannon. It was also invited to give a special performance on China's famous talk show Day Day Up.

Maheshwari returned to fiction shows with MTV India's Girls On Top playing an aspiring musician Sahir Bhasin.

In 2016, Maheshwari participated in the celebrity dance reality show Jhalak Dikhhla Jaa 9 on Colors TV. He was one of the most consistent performers in the show and became the most popular and strongest contender for the title. He received praises from seasoned actor and ex-Jhalak contestant Ronit Roy who called him the winner of the show. Bollywood star Hrithik Roshan called Maheshwari a "flying star". However, he lost the trophy to Teriya Magar and Salman Yusuff Khan and became the 2nd runner-up.

In 2017, he starred in a short film Something Like Love which marked his foray into the digital cinema. Maheshwari participated in Fear Factor: Khatron Ke Khiladi 8 which was shot in Spain and hosted by Bollywood director Rohit Shetty. He was the most consistent performer and got in the danger zone for the fewest times. Rohit Shetty called him the "silent killer" of the show. He won the show by beating Hina Khan and Ravi Dubey in the finale. Along with his dance crew Desi Hoppers, Maheshwari was invited to perform an exhibition act at the World of Dance 2017 finals in Los Angeles. The crew also went on to perform at Asian Battleground, a cross-national dance reality show shot in Malaysia. Among the twelve dance crews that participated in the competition, Desi Hoppers came 3rd in the showcase rankings and were a part of the top 4 finalists that advanced for the face-off round.

In 2018, Maheshwari hosted MTV India's episodic series Love on the Run. Maheshwari then along with his crew Desi Hoppers participated in the world's biggest dance reality show World of Dance (TV series) and in doing so they became the first-ever Indian dance crew to represent India on such a big platform. They received high praise from judges Jennifer Lopez, Ne-Yo and Derek Hough who loved their unique style and fusion of hip-hop with Indian culture. They also scored an impressive 96 to qualify for the next round which was also the highest score in round one. Maheshwari launched the spring collection of Lee Cooper with #MasterofDenim look. He also gained popularity as the host of Zee TV's reality show India's Best Dramebaaz, which later won the Favorite Non-Fiction Show award at Zee Rishtey Awards.

Along with his crew, Desi Hoppers, Maheshwari gave special performances at the University of Oxford, UK, as part of a social entrepreneur summit with the likes of Academy Award winner Chiwetel Ejiofor, Grammy award winner Sarah McLachlan and chief international anchor for CNN, Christiane Amanpour present. Maheshwari has also given numerous stage performances on Indian Television Academy Awards, Radio Mirchi Top 20 & Golden Petal Awards on Colors TV,&TV It's Diwali, Nickelodeon Kids' Choice Awards India, DID Li'l Masters (Season 4 Finale) & Gold Awards on Zee TV, Adbhut Ganesh Utsav and Dandiya Nights over the years.

Owing to his influence on aspiring youth, IIMUN invited Shantanu to be one of the motivational speakers of IIMUN championship conference MUNCLAVE 2019/20. Shantanu along with Desi Hoppers has choreographed and directed dance performances for the Zee TV show Yeh Teri Galiyan. Shantanu also appeared in a promotional video by Netflix for The Umbrella Academy (TV series) with Tiku Talsania, Supriya Pilgaonkar and Kubbra Sait. His third music video composed by Qaran and sung by Ash King on Sony Music India named "Haaye Oye" featuring Elli Avram opposite him, crossed 45 million views on YouTube within two weeks and trended on various music platforms. He has performed the character of Abir Basu in Ekta Kapoor's web series Medically Yours. He received Likee's Digital Influencer award as the Youth Icon of the year for the same. He along with his partner became the finalist of Nach Baliye season-9.

Maheshwari starred opposite Alia Bhatt in Sanjay Leela Bhansali's Gangubai Kathiawadi in 2022. The film marks his debut in Bollywood.

Shantanu's next film, Love in Vietnam, was announced at the 2024 Cannes Film Festival, and released in September 2025. Directed by Rahhat Shah Kazmi and produced by Omung Kumar, it co-stars Avneet Kaur and Vietnamese actress Kha Ngan. The film marks the first India-Vietnam collaboration and is based on the bestselling novel Madonna in a Fur Coat.

== Filmography ==
=== Films ===
Year	Title	Role	Notes	Ref.
2017	Something Like Love	Rishabh	Short film	
2020	Special Day	Ved Mehra	Short film	
2022	Gangubai Kathiawadi	Afsaan Razaq		
2024	Auron Mein Kahan Dum Tha	Young Krishna		
2024	Chaalchitro: The Frame Fatale	Ritesh Kumar	Bengali debut	
2025	Love in Vietnam	Manav		

=== Television ===
Year	Title	Role	Notes
2001	Kya Masti Kya Dhoom	Contestant	
2002	Boogie Woogie	Contestant	
2008	Dance Bangla Dance	Contestant	
2011–2015	Dil Dosti Dance	Swayam Shekhawat	
2011	Ek Hazaaron Mein Meri Behna Hai	Swayam Shekhawat	Guest
2013	Nach Baliye 5	Swayam Shekhawat	Guest
2014–2015	Yeh Hai Aashiqui	Voice role	
2014–2015	Yeh Hai Aashiqui	Shaan	
2014–2015	Box Cricket League 1	Contestant	
2015	Bindass Naach	Himself	Guest
2015	Twistwala Love	Vivaan	
2015	Pyaar Tune Kya Kiya	Rahul	
2016-2017	Girls on Top	Sahir Bhasin	
2016-2017	Box Cricket League 2	Contestant	
2016-2017	Day Day Up	Himself	Guest
2016-2017	America's Got Talent 11	Himself	Guest
2016-2017	Jhalak Dikhhla Jaa 9	Contestant	2nd runner-up
2016	Bigg Boss 10	Himself	Guest
2017	MTV Big F 2	Terry	
2017	Fear Factor: Khatron Ke Khiladi 8	Contestant	Winner
2017	World of Dance	Himself	Guest
2017	Asian Battleground - Malaysia	Contestant	4th place
2017-2018	MTV Love on the Run	Host	
2018	World Of Dance 2	Contestant	
2018	DID Li'l Masters 4	Host	
2018	India's Best Dramebaaz	Host	
2018	Iconic India	Himself	Guest
2019	Yeh Teri Galiyan	Himself	Guest
2019	Kitchen Champion 5	Himself	Guest
2019	Khatra Khatra Khatra	Himself	Guest
2019	Nach Baliye 9	Contestant	5th place
2019	MTV Ace Of Space 2	Himself	Guest
2019	Jabong Hoop Wars	Himself	Guest

=== Music videos ===
Year	Title	Singer(s)	Ref(s)
2015	Super Girl From China	Kanika Kapoor, Mika Singh	
2018	Aaja Mahi Ve	Aditi Singh Sharma	
2019	Haaye Oye	Qaran, Ash King	
2020	Gud Khake	Bharat Goel, Ash King	
2022	Tutt Gaya	Stebin Ben	
2022	Kesariyo Rang	Asees Kaur, Dev Negi	
2023	Mast Aankhein	Tulsi Kumar, Jubin Nautiyal	
2023	Aakhir	Vishal Mishra	

=== Web series ===
Year	Title	Role	Ref.
2018	XXX	Bittu	
2019	Medically Yourrs	Abir Basu	
2023	Tooth Pari: When Love Bites	Dr. Bikram Roy	
2023–2026	Campus Beats	Ishaan	
2024	Ishq In The Air	Naman	

== Awards and nominations ==
Year	Award	Category	Work	Result
2014	Indian Television Academy Awards	GR8 on Screen Couple (Viewers Choice Awards) (along with Vrushika Mehta)	Dil Dosti Dance	Won
2014	Indian Telly Awards	Indian Telly Jury Award for Best Choreographer (along with Macedon D'Mello)	Dil Dosti Dance	Nominated
2015	World of Dance	World of Dance, L.A. 2015 Championship (as part of Desi Hoppers)	Desi Hoppers	Won
2016	Asian Viewers Television Awards	Male Actor of the Year	Girls on Top	Nominated
2017	Indian Television Academy Awards	Favourite Popular Star (Male)	Fear Factor: Khatron Ke Khiladi 8	Nominated
2017	Indian Television Academy Awards	Best Actor (Male)	MTV Big F Season 2	Nominated
2018	Indian Television Academy Awards	Popular Star (Male)	MTV Love On The Run	Nominated
2019	Indian Telly Awards	Best Star - Popular (Male)	Nach Baliye 9	Nominated
2023	Filmfare Awards	Best Male Debut	Gangubai Kathiawadi	Nominated
2023	International Indian Film Academy Awards	Best Male Debut	Gangubai Kathiawadi	Won
2024	Filmfare OTT Awards	Best Actor in a Series (Male): Drama	Campus Beats	Nominated

== See also ==
- List of dancers
