= Tooth Pari: When Love Bites =

Indian horror comedy series

- Genre: Supernatural horror Fantasy; Romance
- Created by: Pratim D. Gupta
- Written by: Pratim D. Gupta; Sejal Pachisia
- Directed by: Pratim D. Gupta
- Starring: Shantanu Maheshwari; Tanya Maniktala; Tillotama Shome; Sikandar Kher; Saswata Chatterjee; Revathi; Adil Hussain
- Composer: Neel Adhikari
- Country of origin: India
- Original language: Hindi
- No. of series: 1
- No. of episodes: 8

Production
- Executive producers: Pratim D. Gupta; Mrinalini Khanna; Vishal Mehra; Harish Shah
- Producers: Rishi Negi; Gaurav Gokhale; Mitul Mody; Abhishek Rege
- Cinematography: Subhankar Bhar
- Editor: Antara Lahiri
- Running time: 40–48 minutes
- Production company: Endemol Shine India

Original release
- Network: Netflix
- Release: 20 April 2023

Tooth Pari: When Love Bites is a 2023 Indian Hindi-language romantic supernatural horror television series created, written and directed by Pratim D. Gupta, with Sejal Pachisia as the screenwriter on two of the eight episodes. Produced by Endemol Shine India, it stars Shantanu Maheshwari and Tanya Maniktala, alongside Revathi, Tillotama Shome, Sikandar Kher and Adil Hussain. The series premiered on Netflix on 20 April 2023.

== Synopsis ==
Rumi, a defiant vampire, lives with Ora's clan. Because of a deal they made with a man named Adi Deb, also known as AD, whose family has been protecting the clan for years, the clan is not allowed to enter the human world. AD provides them with entertainment as well as blood from a nearby hospital, allowing these vampires to live underground without killing the humans above. Living outside of the human world has also kept them safe from the Cutmundus, a coven led by a witch named Luna Luka who has been their arch-enemy for years.

== Cast ==
- Shantanu Maheshwari as Dr. Bikram Roy
- Tanya Maniktala as Rumi
- Anish Railkar as Ora
- Revathi as Luna Luka
- Tillotama Shome as Meera
- Sikandar Kher as Kartik Pal
- Saswata Chatterjee as David
- Adil Hussain as Adi Deb/A.D.
- Avijit Dutt as Ian Zachariah
- Anindita Bose as Sreela
- Anjan Dutt as Biren Pal
- Kharaj Mukherjee as Chowdhury
- Rajatava Dutta as Dr. Roy
- Swaroopa Ghosh as Mrs. Roy
- Zarina Wahab as Mamata Deb
- Barun Chanda as Haru
- Bhaswar Chatterjee as Kundu
- Soham Maitra
- Chitrak Bandyopadhyay as Badshah
- Keith Anthony Sequeira as Amar

== See also ==
- List of Netflix India originals
- List of Netflix original programming
