= World of Dance =

American media company

- Industry: Dance and music entertainment
- Genre: Music and dance entertainment
- Founded: 2008
- Founder: David Gonzalez & Myron Marten
- Headquarters: Fullerton, California, United States
- Area served: United States, Canada, United Kingdom, South America, and Asia
- Website: WorldofDance.com

World of Dance is a Southern California-based dance, fashion, music, and entertainment brand founded by Matthew Everitt, David Gonzalez, Myron Marten, Michael McGinn, and Herman Flores in 2008. It is the world's largest dance entertainment enterprise, elevating artists and brands with events, entertainment and digital engagement. The brand encompasses more platforms than any other dance content provider or dance show case, including World of Dance competitions in more than 25 countries, the NBC World of Dance television show (executive produced by Jennifer Lopez), the World of Dance Live tour, a fashion line, and the largest YouTube dance network with more than 300 channels, including the World of Dance YouTube channel, with more than 4 million subscribers. Its events bring together performers from the street, urban, and hip hop dance world, connecting the dance community with a particular focus on millennial and post-millennial audiences.

In 2017, World of Dance launched World of Dance Digital Lab, a full-service, in-house production studio connecting brands to youth culture. Services include branded entertainment, influencer marketing, content strategy and production, targeted media distribution, and experiential activations.

== World of Dance competitions ==
The first World of Dance competition was held in 2008. Since then, the brand has expanded to competitions in more than 25 countries. Each year, World of Dance Qualifier events are held around the world (40 internationally, 15 in the U.S.), bringing together street and urban dance crews to compete for two titles: winner of the Upper Division (for 18 years and older) and winner of the Youth Division (17 years old or younger). The winners of each category are invited to compete at World of Dance Finals event, where they compete for the world title.

World of Dance competitions are notable for their scoring approach. Each competition is judged by a five-person panel, usually composed of dance celebrities, industry professionals, and influencers. Using an Olympic-style approach, competitors are judged according to five criteria: Performance, Technique, Choreography, Creativity, and Presentation. Each category is worth 20 points, for a total of 100 points. Once all judges have inputted their score, the highest and lowest scores are removed, and the final score is the average score of the remaining three. Those with a score above 85 move on to finals.

In addition to the competition, World of Dance events also include performances from industry talent (non-competing), dance crews, choreographers, and freestylers, as well as live battles, appearances by industry influences, music, live art, vendors, and more.

== Notable World of Dance judges, performers, guests ==
World of Dance events feature the industry's best as judges, performers, or guests, including many performers who have appeared in nationally televised dance competitions, such as World of Dance, So You Think You Can Dance, America's Best Dance Crew (ABDC), and more. Notable WOD guests include all seven ABDC champions, JabbaWockeeZ, Super Cr3w, Quest Crew, We Are Heroes, Poreotics, I.aM.mE, and Electrolytes. Additional performers include 8 Flavahz, Kaba Modern, SoReal Cru, Gotham actress Camren Bicondova, Les Twins, Chachi Gonzales, Dytto, Ian Eastwood, Kaelynn Gobert-Harris, Black-ish star Miles Brown, SYTYCD Season 10 Male Winner Fik-Shun, and India's famous dance group/WOD winners Desi Hoppers, led by Shantanu Maheshwari and Kings United led by Suresh.

== World of Dance television show ==
In 2017, the NBC premiered World of Dance, a 10-episode dance competition program produced by Universal Television Alternative Studio in association with Nuyorican Productions and World of Dance. Executive producing are Jennifer Lopez, Elaine Goldsmith-Thomas, Benny Medina, Kris Curry, Matilda Zoltowski, David Gonzalez and Matthew Everitt. The show features celebrity judges Jennifer Lopez, Derek Hough, Ne-Yo, and host/mentor Jenna Dewan-Tatum, along with 50 of the world's best dancers and dance teams competing for a $1 million prize—the largest prize of any dance competition show.

As Lopez told the New York Times, “My whole goal with this show was to create an opportunity and a venue for dancers to actually be the stars,” Ms. Lopez said, and to get to do something they rarely have a chance to do: “really make some money.”

World of Dance contestants were picked from qualifying events around the nation and online submissions. Contestants are divided into three divisions:

- Junior: Any size act, 17 years old and under
- Upper: Groups of 1–4, 18 and older
- Team: Groups of 5+, 18 and older

In each episode, dancers compete before the judges and are scored according to World of Dance scoring criteria: Performance, Technique, Choreography, Creativity, and Presentation. Each category is worth 20 points, for a total of 100 points. The show consists of five rounds:

- The Qualifiers: In each round of the Qualifiers, the dance acts perform a 2-minute routine in front of the judges and a live audience. They are judged according to criteria, and only those who receive a combined total score of 80 or higher move forward.
- The Duels: Acts are paired against each other, and the highest scoring act moves on to the next round. In each round of The Duels, two acts in the same division compete for a spot in the next round. In each division, the acts with the top qualifying scores choose their opponents, then both acts perform back-to-back, receiving feedback from the judges. After each performance, the judges score them. Unlike the Qualifiers, only the final combined total score for each act is shown. The act with the highest score at the end of the duel moves on to the next round; the other faces immediate elimination.
- The Cut: In The Cut, the 15 remaining acts compete for three spots in each of their divisions.
- Divisional Finals: Two acts in each division compete against each other, winners in each division move on to the next round.
- World Finals: In the World Final, the final 3 acts, one from each division, compete to win the one million dollar prize.

The show premiered May 30, 2017, at 10/9 central on NBC, debuting to 9.8 million viewers. It was canceled on March 15, 2021, after four seasons.

== Events ==
- May 14, 2022, World of Dance New Jersey, iPLAY AMERICA
- August 16, 2015, World of Dance Finals, Los Angeles Convention Center
- August 15, 2015, World of Dance Los Angeles, Los Angeles Convention Center
- July 13, 2015, World of Dance Vancouver, Croatian Cultural Centre
- May 30, 2015, World of Dance Orlando, Osceola Performing Arts Center and Expo
- May 23, 2015, World of Dance New Jersey, iPLAY AMERICA
- May 18, 2015, World of Dance Philippine Qualifier, UP Theater
- April 12, 2015, World of Dance Belgium Qualifier, Venue to be determined
- April 11, 2015, World of Dance Dallas, South Side Ballroom
- April 5, 2015 World of Dance France Qualifier, La Salle Du Summum de Grenoble
- March 21, 2015, World of Dance Anaheim, The Grove
- February 10, 2015, World of Dance Industry Awards, Avalon Hollywood
- January 25, 2015, World of Dance Montreal, Rialto Theatre Montreal
- December 20, 2014, World of Dance Las Vegas, Cashman Center
- December 14, 2014, World of Dance Hawaii, Blaisdell Concert Hall
- November 22, 2014, World of Dance Chicago, Copernicus Theater
- November 22, 2014: World of Dance Germany, Huxleys Neue Welt
- November 15, 2014: World of Dance Seattle, Highline Performing Arts Center
- November 2, 2014: World of Dance Boston, Back Bay Event Center
- October 19, 2014: World of Dance Netherlands, Dommelstraat 2
- October 18, 2014: World of Dance San Diego, California Center for the Arts
- October 4, 2014: World of Dance Toronto, Queen Elizabeth Theatre
- September 28, 2014: World of Dance London, Coronet London
- August 30, 2014: World of Dance Live, Universal Citywalk
- August 23, 2014: World of Dance Houston, Warehouse Live
- August 16, 2014: World of Dance Bay Area, Solano Fairgrounds
- April 26, 2014: World of Dance Dallas, South Side Ballroom
- April 19, 2014: World of Dance Orlando, Osceola Performing Arts Center and Expo
- April 12, 2014: World of Dance Los Angeles, Los Angeles Convention Center
- March 23, 2014: World of Dance Belgium, TRIX
- December 8, 2013: World of Dance Hawaii, Blaisdell Arena
- November 16, 2013: World of Dance San Diego, San Diego Concourse
- November 15, 2013: World of Dance Chicago, Copernicus Theater
- November 9, 2013: World of Dance New Jersey, Encore Event Center
- November 2, 2013: World of Dance Boston, Chevalier Theater
- October 12, 2013: World of Dance Toronto, Queen Elizabeth Theatre
- September 29, 2013: World of Dance Netherlands, DommelStraat 2
- September 7, 2013 World of Dance Seattle, Auburn Performing Arts
- August 31, 2013: World of Dance Live, Universal Studios Citywalk
- August 24, 2013: World of Dance Houston, Warehouse Live
- August 17, 2013: World of Dance Bay Area, Solano County Fairgrounds
- July 27, 2013: World of Dance Orlando, Osceola Performing Arts Center and Expo
- June 22, 2013: World of Dance Vancouver, Croatian Cultural Centre
- May 25, 2013: World of Dance New York, Terminal 5
- April 20, 2013: World of Dance Dallas, Palladium Ballroom
- April 6, 2013: World of Dance Los Angeles, Los Angeles Convention Center
- December 8, 2012: World of Dance Hawaii, Blaisdell Arena Honolulu, Hawaii
- November 17, 2012: World of Dance Chicago, Copernicus Theater
- November 10, 2012: World of Dance Boston, Chevalier Theater
- October 6, 2012: World of Dance San Diego, San Diego Concourse
- September 29, 2012: World of Dance Vancouver, Douglas College
- September 8, 2012: World of Dance Seattle, Auburn Performing Arts Center
- August 18, 2012: World of Dance San Francisco, Solano County Fairgrounds
- May 26, 2012: World of Dance New York, Harlem Armory
- May 20, 2012: World of Dance Toronto, Sound Academy
- April 21, 2012: World of Dance Dallas, Palladium Nightclub
- April 7, 2012: World of Dance Los Angeles, Los Angeles Convention Center
- March 10, 2012: Lifestyle Event “Beat Swap Meet” - one of the best urban events held downtown Los Angeles
- March 3, 2012: Battlefest 17, Inside Pulse New York City
- March 3, 2012: Urban Street Jam Event, Anaheim Convention Center - featured over 40 groups competing in Adult, Varsity and Junior Varsity sections
- February 19, 2012: 2nd Annual World of Dance Industry Awards, ICON Ultra Lounge
- November 27, 2011: World of Dance Chicago, Chicago Theater Illinois Chicago
- November 5, 2011: World of Dance Boston, Chevalier Theater Boson, Massachusetts
- October 15, 2011: World of Dance San Diego Concourse
- September 18, 2011: World of Dance Toronto
- August 20, 2011: World of Dance – Solano County Fairgrounds
- April 2, 2011: World of Dance Los Angeles 2011, Los Angeles Convention Center - Hype took 1st place
- 2011: World of Dance Seattle, B-boys Battle

=== WOD 2012 Industry Awards ===
- Decade of Dance Award – Napoleon and Tabitha D'umo (Nappytabs) were recognized for their achievement and dedication to the hip-hop dance community.
- Best Junior Team Award – Chi-Town's Finest Breakers were honored as the Best Junior Team of the year.
- Teen Choreographer of the year – 16-year-old Chachi Gonzales was named Teen Choreographer of the Year.
- Team of the Year - Mos Wanted Crew was nominated for Team of the Year.
- January 29, 2012: Vibe 17 Dance Competition, UCI Bren Events Center

== See also ==
- So You Think You Can Dance
- Dancing with the Stars
- Dance Dance Dance
- America's Best Dance Crew
- The X Factor
