= Chutzpah (TV series) =

Indian television series (2021)

- Promotional poster
- Genre: Drama
- Created by: Mrighdeep Singh Lamba
- Written by: Amit Babbar; Mrighdeep Singh Lamba
- Directed by: Simarpreet Singh
- Starring: Tanya Maniktala; Elnaaz Norouzi; Varun Sharma; Manjot Singh; Diksha Singh; Kshitij Chauhan
- Music by: Ketan Sodha
- Country of origin: India
- Original language: Hindi
- No. of seasons: 1
- No. of episodes: 7

Production
- Producer: Dinesh Vijan
- Cinematography: Kabir Tejpal; Gianni Giannelli
- Editor: Amit Kulkarni
- Running time: 3 Hour 53 minutes
- Production company: Maddock Outsider

Original release
- Network: SonyLIV
- Release: 23 July 2021

Chutzpah is an Indian drama based web series on SonyLIV directed by Simarpreet Singh and premiered on SonyLIV on 23 July 2021. The show is created by Mrighdeep Singh Lamba and produced by Dinesh Vijan. The series is produced under Vijan's banner Maddock Films' digital content division, Outsider Films. Chutzpah is written by Amit Babbar and Mrighdeep Singh Lamba. The series features Tanya Maniktala, Elnaaz Norouzi, Varun Sharma, Diksha Singh and Manjot Singh. The show has been released in Hindi, Tamil, Telugu and Malayalam and is streaming on Sony LIV from 23 July 2021. The series is about the weird and wild universe of the web.

== Premise ==
The show is about five individuals and 1 story just connected through the internet showcases the power of social media and highlights the digital influence on the youth of today.

== Cast ==
- Tanya Maniktala as Shikha
- Elnaaz Norouzi as Wild Butterfly/Sara Khan, a Camgirl
- Varun Sharma as Vikas Bhalla
- Manjot Singh as Rishi
- Diksha Singh as Neena
- Gautam Mehra as Kevin
- Aashima Mahajan as Deepali
- Kshitij Chauhan as Prateek
- Varun Tewari as John
- Pranali Rathod as Richa
- Komal Singh as Pooja
- Christopher Ramirez as George
- Ashwin Kaushal as Indian Boss
- Rachel Ann Mullins as Jeliene Scott
- Preeti Kocchar as Vikas' Mother
- Babla Kocchar as Vikas' Father
- Garima Agarwal
- R. Bhakti Klein

== Episodes ==
No.	Title	Directed by	Written by	Original release date
1	"Login"	Simarpreet Singh	Mrighdeep Lamba	23 July 2021
In a world that fluctuates between 'www.' and '.com', we see some individuals who share their own 'chutzpah' experiences with this world. Rishi, an introverted boy stumbles upon an unexpected guest at an unexpected place. Vikas, a Punjabi boy who recently shifted to Boston, speaks of his love/hate relationship with America to his family and girlfriend back in India. Prateek, a handsome Casanova, demonstrates a live example of his escapades to his crazy vlogger flatmate Kevin, who himself receives a life-changing notification. John, a social media ghost and Kevin's brother, worries about his brother's obsession with the internet.
2	"If There Was Another World"	Simarpreet Singh	Mrighdeep Lamba	23 July 2021
John spends a night mesmerized by famous influencer Deepali Shah and her vlogs. Vikas and Shikha crack a unique idea together. Rishi is bowled over by an interaction he comes across on 'lizonline.com'. Kevin shares a witty chat with his idol.
3	"Be Right Back"	Simarpreet Singh	Mrighdeep Lamba	23 July 2021
Rishi gathers the courage to finally send the long-awaited text. Vikas and Shikha experiment with a new way of making love from afar. Prateek is approached by a charming enchantress. Wild Butterfly and Pokerboy cross paths again.
4	"Main Timeline Hoon"	Simarpreet Singh	Mrighdeep Lamba	23 July 2021
Deepali Shah uploads another refreshing video. Rishi expresses his love for the woman of his dreams. Vikas and Shikha discover some realities of their relationship. Prateek trusts Kevin with an important task.
5	"Detox"	Simarpreet Singh	Mrighdeep Lamba	23 July 2021
The tension between Prateek and Neena begins to erupt. Rishi approaches Kevin for a special favour. Deepali Shah is introduced to someone special. Wild Butterfly opens up to Pokerboy. Kevin's video finds its place in the world wide web.
6	"Flavour Of The Month"	Simarpreet Singh	Mrighdeep Lamba	23 July 2021
Sara Khan prepares herself for an audition that could change her life. Prateek learns of a surprising truth about Neena. Rishi and Richa encounter a quirky scenario in the midst of getting to know each other.
7	"Shadow"	Simarpreet Singh	Mrighdeep Lamba	23 July 2021
Vikas and Shree have a realization that will change his approach towards the App. Rishi finds himself confused between two roads. Deepali Shah faces reality in her reel world. Kevin deals with his biggest demons.

== Reception ==
News 18 says that the show has caught the essence of the online world while also exploring and displaying the dark side of the web and the characters. They also said the show has " moments that ensure laughter and uplift the mood".

Archika Khurana from The Times of India wrote, "this seven-part series is aimed squarely towards the younger generation, for whom the internet and social media have become an inextricable part of their daily lives. However, it becomes entangled in its own web of clichés and sloppy execution, failing to connect well enough to make it a compelling watch. Despite its shortcomings, it is watchable to some extent if you have nothing else to do."

Samrudhi Ghosh from Hindustan Times wrote, "The performances make up for some of Chutzpah’s flaws - Fukrey duo Varun and Manjot’s comic timing is on point, Gautam is convincing as the likes-obsessed content creator and Tanya has an endearing quality to her. However, the show never finds its way out of the pedestrian and does not have much to stop one from scrolling past."
