= Secret Lives of Women =

American reality television series

Secret Lives of Women is an American reality television series that aired Tuesday nights at 10 PM Eastern Time on WE: Women's Entertainment. The show probes little-known subcultures of women in the United States. A typical format was a series of interviews conducted with several women (and occasionally transgender women).

== Season 1 (2005) ==
- Transsexuals
- Shopaholic
- Plastic Surgery Addicts
- Eating Disorders
- Forensic Investigators
- Women In Porn
- Surgeons
- Late In Life Lesbians
- Sex Trade

== Season 2 (2006) ==
- Cutters
- Women Who Love Bad Men
- Married To Cross Dressers
- Fetishes
- Robbing The Cradle
- Swingers
- Plastic Surgery Addicts 2
- Meth Addicts

== Season 3 (2007) ==
- Polygamy
- Munchausen Moms
- Black Widow Women
- Phone Sex Operators
- Lipstick Lesbians
- Cougars
- Sex For Sale
- Cheaters
- Obsessive Compulsives
- Shoplifters

== Season 4 (2008) ==
- Fetishes and Fantasies
- Sideshow Gals
- Exposed: Sexual Predators
- Amazon Women
- Polygamy Cult
- Psychics
- Mafia Women
- Husband Beaters
- Voyeurs and Exhibitionists
- Stalkers
- Girl Gangs
- Porn Stars
- Size Matters: Tall, Small, and Extra Large
- Dirty Little Suburban Secrets
- Eating Disorders
- Child Brides
- Mistresses
- Open Relationships
- Unexpected Love
- Extreme Body Modifications
- Extreme Weight Loss
- Extreme Beliefs
- Extreme Plastic Surgery
- Specialty Models
- Phobias
- The Occult
- Sex Addicts

== Season 5 (2009) ==
- Mothers of Murderers
- Extreme Diets
- Cults
- Nasty Divorces
- Women of Erotica
- Mini Women
- Shopping Addicts

== See also ==
- 2005 in television
