= A Suitable Boy (TV series) =

BBC Television drama series by Mira Nair

- Genre: Drama
- Based on: A Suitable Boy by Vikram Seth
- Written by: Andrew Davies
- Directed by: Mira Nair; Shimit Amin
- Starring: Tabu; Ishaan Khatter; Tanya Maniktala; Rasika Dugal; Ahmad Harhash
- Composers: Score: Alex Heffes; Anoushka Shankar; Songs: Kavita Seth
- Countries of origin: United Kingdom; India
- Original languages: Bengali; English; Hindi; Urdu
- No. of series: 1
- No. of episodes: 6

Production
- Executive producers: Mira Nair; Vikram Seth; Andrew Davies; Faith Penhale; Laura Lankester; Will Johnston; Lydia Dean Pilcher; Aradhana Seth; Mona Qureshi; Ayela Butt
- Producers: Lydia Dean Pilcher; Aradhana Seth
- Cinematography: Declan Quinn
- Editors: Nick Fenton; Tanupriya Sharma
- Production company: Lookout Point TV

Original release
- Network: BBC One
- Release: 26 July – 24 August 2020

A Suitable Boy is a British television drama miniseries directed by Mira Nair and adapted by Andrew Davies from Vikram Seth's 1993 novel of the same name. Set in the backdrop of post-independent India, A Suitable Boy follows four linked families in North India, where the story revolves around Mrs. Rupa Mehra who is in search of a suitable husband for her youngest daughter Lata. Meanwhile, the daughter is torn between her duty towards her mother and the idea of romance with her suitors.

The series stars Tanya Maniktala as the main character Lata, with Tabu, Ishaan Khatter, Rasika Dugal, Mahira Kakkar, Ram Kapoor, Namit Das, Vivaan Shah, Mikhail Sen, Danesh Rizvi, Shahana Goswami, Ranvir Shorey, Vijay Varma and Kulbhushan Kharbanda in prominent roles, as its storyline features more than 110 characters. It is the first BBC period-drama series to have a non-white cast.

The adaptation of the series was officially announced by Charlotte Moore, the BBC's head of content, in May 2017, with Mira Nair announced as directing the series. The principal shoot of the series took place in September 2019. The series were filmed across Lucknow, as the primary location, and also in Maheshwar and Kanpur. The background music for the series was composed by Alex Heffes and Anoushka Shankar, with Kavita Seth scoring music for the songs. It was photographed by cinematographer Declan Quinn, with Nick Fenton and Tanupriya Sharma, editing the series.

A Suitable Boy was premiered in the United Kingdom on BBC One, from 26 July to 24 August 2020. It was globally premiered on the streaming platform Netflix (excluding North America and China), with all six episodes released on 23 October 2020. In the United States and Canada, the series premiered on Acorn TV, on 7 December 2020. The series received a mixed response from critics, who praised the performances of the cast and the settings, but criticised the stereotypical portrayal of India, and the writing and direction.

== Synopsis ==
A Suitable Boy is set in 1951, a newly post-independence, post-partition India. The novel follows four families during 18 months, and centres on Mrs. Rupa Mehra (Mahira Kakkar) and her efforts over the arrangement of the marriage of her younger daughter, Lata Mehra (Tanya Maniktala), to a "suitable boy". Lata is a 19-year-old university student who refuses to be influenced by her domineering mother or opinionated brother, Arun Mehra (Vivek Gomber). Her story revolves around the choice she is forced to make between her suitors.

== Cast ==
=== Main ===
- Tabu as Saeeda Bai
- Ishaan Khatter as Maan Kapoor
- Tanya Maniktala as Lata Mehra
- Mahira Kakkar as Rupa Mehra
- Rasika Dugal as Savita Kapoor née Mehra
- Shahana Goswami as Meenakshi Mehra
- Ram Kapoor as Mahesh Kapoor (State Minister of Revenue), Maan's father
- Aamir Bashir as Nawab of Baitar
- Danesh Razvi as Kabir Durrani
- Vivek Gomber as Arun Mehra
- Gagan Dev Riar as Pran Kapoor
- Geeta Agarwal Sharma as Mrs. Mahesh Kapoor
- Shubham Saraf as Nawabzada Firoz Khan
- Vivaan Shah as Varun Mehra
- Namit Das as Haresh Khanna
- Mikhail Sen as Amit Chatterji
- Vijay Varma as Rasheed
- Vijay Raaz as Rashid's father
- Ranvir Shorey as Waris
- Kuldeep Sareen as Munshi ji
- Shubham Saraf as Firoz Ali Khan

=== Recurring ===
- Thomas Weinhappel as Hans
- Joyeeta Dutta as Tasneem
- Sharvari Deshpande as Malati
- Shujaat Khan as Ustad Majeed Khan
- Randeep Hooda as Billy Irani
- Kulbhushan Kharbanda as Kishen Chand Seth
- Vinay Pathak as L.N. Agrawal
- Manoj Pahwa as Raja Of Marh
- Sadaf Jafar as Bibbo
- Mansi Multani as Kalpana Gaur
- Amrita Dass as the Sweet Lady
- Anshdeep Singh as Sikh Classical music player
- Ahmad Harhash as Veer Malhotra Bibbo Cousin
- Marek Dobes as Novak
- Yusuf Akhtar as Bhaskar Tandon, Mahesh's grandson
- Faezeh Jalali as Mrs. Sahgal

== Episodes ==
No.	Title	Directed by	Written by	Original release date	UK viewers (millions)
1	Episode 1	Mira Nair	Andrew Davies	26 July 2020	6.56
The episode starts with the marriage of Savita Mehra to Pran Kapoor. The Mehras consist of four siblings: Arun (married to Meenakshi, they have a daughter Aparna and stay in Calcutta), Savita, Varun, Lata and their mother Rupa. During the wedding, Rupa keeps telling Lata that she is next in line for marriage. Lata is a Literature student at Brahmpur University. She is free-spirited and wants to make her own path in life. She meets Kabir Durrani, a history student at the University. After a few meetings with him, she decides that she likes him and arranges to meet him in secret as he is a Muslim and her family would object. In a parallel setting, the story of the Kapoor family is shown. Mahesh Kapoor is a Revenue Minister in the Purva Pradesh Government. He is pushing the very important Zamindari Bill in the state assembly. He lives with his wife and youngest son, Maan, who doesn't want to follow in his father's footsteps. Maan becomes infatuated with Saeeda Bai, a singer and a courtesan who is much older than he is.
2	Episode 2	Mira Nair	Andrew Davies	2 August 2020	4.67
Lata and Kabir continue to see each other in secret. Maan also visits Saeeda regularly. Rupa finds out about Lata and Kabir and decides that the family will go to Calcutta. Maan returns home drunk and his father throws him out. Saeeda says he should go and stay with her sister’s tutor. Meenakshi takes the Mehras to a party where Lata meets Meenakshi’s brother Amit, a highly regarded poet.
3	Episode 3	Mira Nair	Andrew Davies	9 August 2020	4.17
Amit shows Lata around the city and they become friends. Rupa visits a friend in Lucknow to find a “suitable boy”. Maan witnesses poverty and abuse by Rasheed’s father. He becomes popular with the villagers but he wants to return to Saeeda. Rupa is introduced to Haresh and they visit his shoe factory. Lata is visited during the night. Firoz is seeing Saeeda’s sister Tasneem in secret. Rupa and Lata return to Calcutta. Pran, Savita and Mrs Mahesh Kapoor are separated from Bhaskar during a stampede.
4	Episode 4	Shimit Amin	Andrew Davies	16 August 2020	4.11
Bhaskar is found safe and well. Haresh resigns when his boss doesn’t support him but finds a job with a European company. Savita gives birth. Lata joins the student drama society production of Twelfth Night, meeting Kabir again. Maan upsets Saeeda. Maan and Firoz are confronted by a mob as tensions between Hindus and Muslims rise. Lata isn’t sure a relationship with Kabir would work.
5	Episode 5	Mira Nair	Andrew Davies	23 August 2020	3.81
Maan goes campaigning with his father. Rupa and Lata are in Calcutta. Haresh invites everyone to a Christmas meal. Lata goes to a New Year’s party but Amit takes her into the city. Haresh goes to see Lata but she upsets him. Maan warns Rasheed off. Saeeda tells Maan not to come again. He sees Firoz at Saeeda’s. Tasneem is not Saeeda's sister but her daughter by Firoz' father. Maan attacks Firoz and seriously wounds him.
6	Episode 6	Mira Nair	Andrew Davies	24 August 2020	3.63
Maan runs away to Banares then hands himself in. His mother collapses and dies. Firoz didn’t die, though he was seriously injured. Mahesh’s opponents use the incident against him. Lata finds Kabir oppressive and Amit frivolous. Mahesh loses the election. Firoz says it was an accident and Maan is acquitted. Haresh visits Lata to say goodbye. He had been writing to her but her brother threw the letters away. Lata asks Haresh to marry her, and he accepts.

== Production ==
=== Origin ===
"I have carried with me for many years the stories of Lata, her family and the many people they encounter. I look forward to seeing them brought to life for television, and I am particularly happy that the series is to be filmed in India with an entirely Indian cast."

— Vikram Seth, on the adaptation of his novel to miniseries, in a press report to The Times of India

In May 2017, Charlotte Moore, head of content for BBC Studios, announced for an adaptation of Vikram Seth's 1993 novel A Suitable Boy, into a mini-television series. The news was disclosed by publisher Aleph Book Company in an official press release on 5 May 2017. The makers reportedly finalized screenwriter Andrew Davies, to pen the adapted screenplay, and also decided cast non-white characters for the series, thus becoming BBC's first period drama with a non-white cast. Piers Wenger, BBC's head of drama also said to the same publication, “It’s a 20th century classic and it is obviously set outside the UK in a world which is non-white, non-British, and yet which has big universal themes at the heart of it.”

Andrew Davies eventually spoke about the main character Lata, in an interview to Deadline Hollywood stating that "Lata’s trials of the heart speak as loudly to me now as when I first read Vikram’s epic novel two decades ago. She is a great literary heroine in the tradition of Jane Austen and George Eliot. But behind her stands a massive supporting cast of striking, funny, irrepressible characters and a vision of India in the 1950s that no reader can ever forget."

In May 2019, the six-part series was officially commissioned by BBC Studios, with Indian filmmaker Mira Nair being brought on board as director. On her inclusion in the project, she stated that "I eventually liked the book, when it was published in late 1993, and tried to get the rights to adapt it into a film. But it was too big and too hard to adapt at that point. So, I created my own microcosmic response to the huge epic by making my own intimate Monsoon Wedding (2001). It is great to be going back to it." Produced on a budget of £16 million, it is one of the most expensive BBC series ever made.

=== Casting ===
"Before becoming an actor, I used to work as a copywriter and I was very happy with it. One day a friend called me and asked me to come for an audition without telling me what it was for. I showed up at the audition and it was for A Suitable Boy, for Lata’s character and I was shocked. A few days before the audition, my friend and I were talking about the novel and about Lata and Malti’s relationship, because we could relate with it. It was sudden but it was the most memorable audition of my life."

— Tanya Maniktala, on playing the central character Lata, in the series, in an interview to Filmfare

Wenger, told The Telegraph UK that it was "a deliberate gamble" to adapt a drama with no white characters. In May 2019, when Mira Nair was hired for the film, she stated that 80% of the casting has been finalized, with Tabu, Shefali Shah, Vivek Gomber, Rasika Dugal and Vivaan Shah being a part of the cast. However she did not finalize the casting for the main character Lata, with a leading actress was reported to play the role, although Mira did not reveal the details, which later revealed to be Tanya Maniktala. In August 2019, Ishaan Khatter was reported to play a pivotal role in the series. Later in September 2019, Namit Das joined the cast the following month. There are 110 characters in the series.

=== Filming ===
A Suitable Boy was filmed in various locations across India. Principal photography began in Lucknow in September 2019, with the actors undergone look tests and script reading sessions, before commencing the shoot. Shooting took place in King George's Medical University in Lucknow, which was shown as Brahmpur University. In December 2019, the makers wrapped up the shooting schedule in Lucknow. The shooting came to halt after Sadaf Jafar, one of the cast members in the series got arrested by the police, due to her involvement in the protests against the new citizenship law in Lucknow, with Nair demanding for her release.

The series was followed by sequences being shot in a number of other cities in India, including Maheshwar and Kanpur in Madhya Pradesh. The makers filmed aerial shots of the Narmada river, which is shadowed by the temple complex Ahilya Fort, in the central Indian town of Maheshwar. RadioTimes cited that the river and fort provide the "soul of the series with Lata’s early morning boat rides providing some of the most memorable imagery from both the book and series".

=== Music ===
The original soundtrack for A Suitable Boy, featured instrumental score by British composer Alex Heffes and Anoushka Shankar, and ghazals composed and sung by Kavita Seth, who also voiced Saeeda Bai's character (played by Tabu). The soundtrack album was released on 23 October 2020 in digital and physical formats.

== Release ==
The first look stills of A Suitable Boy was released on 2 December 2019, through the social media platforms. On 11 July 2020, the official trailer of the series was released through YouTube. The series premiered in the United Kingdom on 26 July 2020 on BBC One, with the first episode being aired on the said date, and was ended on 24 August 2020.

The global distribution rights for the series (excluding North America and China), were acquired by Netflix. On 16 July 2020, Netflix announced the release of seventeen Indian originals, along with the Hindi dubbed version. The series released on 23 October 2020. The series premiered through Acorn TV, which bought the distribution rights for the United States and Canada regions, on 7 December 2020.

== Reception ==
=== Critical response ===
The show received mixed reactions from critics. Robyn Bahr of The Hollywood Reporter stated "The potency of Seth's story remains intact; Davies and Nair's stylization nearly clobbers it." Judy Berman, chief editor of Time magazine, wrote: "A Suitable Boy transcends escapism, it’s because she brought the substance along with the sparkle." Jude Dry of IndieWire wrote: "A Suitable Boy lacks the comedic touch of Downton Abbey or the critical lens of The Crown, languishing somewhere in the middle and coming up short. Without a defined perspective on the class and religious conflict it uses as a narrative backdrop, A Suitable Boy feels like frothy fluff — yummy in the moment but easily forgettable and won’t fill you up."

Chitra Ramaswamy of The Guardian stated: "It is beautiful, expensive and groundbreaking in its casting, yet Andrew Davies’s adaptation of Vikram Seth’s tome still feels uncomfortably old-school". The Independent magazine, chief reporter Ed Cumming wrote "This adaptation of Vikram Seth’s epic, 1300-page novel seemed promising, but we’ll have to keep waiting for an Indian family saga of rugged verisimilitude." Writing for The Times, Carol Midgley stated "a zesty new drama with a slight hint of cheese".

Writing for Hindustan Times, Rohan Nahhar wrote: "An astonishing cast, led by Ishaan Khatter, Tabu and Tanya Maniktala, struggles to make the most of minimal screentime and a mediocre script in Mira Nair’s unsuitable adaptation of Vikram Seth’s novel." Anupama Chopra, editor-in-chief of Film Companion wrote: "Mira Nair delivers a visually sumptuous saga which, despite the sizable bumps, is ultimately satisfying." Pankhuri Shukla of The Quint, praised the cast members for the acting sequences, but opined that "the English dialogues seem to be a deterrent to the actors' performances, with the occasional Urdu/Punjabi/Hindi dialogues sprinkled here and there are the only saving grace." Mimi Anthikkad Chibber of The Hindu wrote: "There is no dearth of stereotypes in this adaptation of Vikram Seth’s 1993 novel, yet the show moves too briskly and looks too lovely to ignore".

Devansh Sharma of Firstpost wrote "Seth's book was never celebrated for its plot anyway. Its primary claim to excellence was the language. Neatly and inventively crafted, Seth's words were both transportive and evocative. The translation to visuals achieves only half the job." India Today's Nairita Mukherjee wrote: "A Suitable Boy Review: In 2020, the world is capable of accepting and appreciating non-English content, as long as it has the power of good writing. That's where Mira Nair's adaptation of Vikram Seth's A Suitable Boy stumbles." In a positive note, Saibal Chatterjee of NDTV wrote "A Suitable Boy, does not miss a beat in funnelling a massive novel into an intricately stitched, necessarily pared filmed version. This panoramic portrait of a newly-free nation and fast-changing social segments within it has an easy-flowing quality that belies the sheer magnitude of the exercise." Shubhra Gupta of The Indian Express wrote "The book has enough time and more to get into long, languid, eloquent descriptions of locations, characters, situations; in Mira Nair and Andrew Davies hands, the chop-chop eventually overcomes the choppiness, and becomes its own creature."

=== Controversies ===
The series attracted controversy when Madhya Pradesh Home Minister Narottam Mishra objected to a scene in which the characters Lata (Tanya Maniktala) and Kabir (Danesh Razvi) are shown kissing each other within the premises of a temple. His statement came after a Bharatiya Janata Party Youth leader, Gaurav Tiwari, filed a complaint against the makers on 22 November 2020 for "allegedly hurting religious sentiments". Tiwari also appealed to people at large on Twitter to uninstall the platform Netflix (which bought its global streaming rights) from their phones, as #BoycottNetflix began to trend on Twitter. It was further criticised for portraying Love Jihad. On 25 November, an FIR was filed against two executives from Netflix India, in response to the complaint registered by Tiwari.

== See also ==
- British television programmes with Asian leads
