= Day Day Up =

Television series

- Logo of Day Day Up
- Also known as: Chinese: 天天向上
- Genre: Variety show
- Created by: Ouyang Changlin
- Starring: Celebrities
- Country of origin: China
- Original language: Mandarin
- No. of seasons: 13

Production
- Running time: approx. 90 minutes

Original release
- Network: Hunan Broadcasting System (HBS)
- Release: 4 August 2008 – 2022

Day Day Up
- Chinese: 天天向上
- Traditional Chinese: 天天向上
- Simplified Chinese: 天天向上
- Literal meaning: Day Day Up
Transcriptions
Standard Mandarin
- Hanyu Pinyin: Tiān Tiān Xiàng Shàng
- IPA: tʰʲǣntʰʲǣn ɕàŋʂàŋ

Day Day Up (Chinese: 天天向上; pinyin: tiāntiān xiàngshàng) was a Chinese talk show aired on Hunan Television from 2008 to 2022. Shortly after its launch, the program established a hosting ensemble collectively known as Everyday Brothers, led by Wang Han and originally consisting of Eddy Ou, Qian Feng, Tian Yuan, Yu Haoming, Kim Eun Sung, and Hiroshi Yano. The group reflected a pan-Asian concept, with members from mainland China, Taiwan, South Korea, and Japan. The lineup evolved over time and notably included Wang Yibo, whose tenure as a co-host preceded his breakthrough in The Untamed (2019). In its final period the program was primarily hosted by Wang Han, Qi Sijun, Sha Baoliang, Pan Yueming, Hu Haiquan, Ding Zhen, Wu Zelin, and Zhang Yanqi. Throughout its run, Day Day Up was one of Hunan Television's two flagship programs, alongside Happy Camp, and one of the most popular television shows in China

The Chinese name of the show was taken from a Chinese idiom coined by Mao Zedong, "study hard and make progress every day" (好好学习，天天向上; hǎohāo xuéxí, tiāntiān xiàngshàng), which is literally translated as "study well, move up day by day".

== Background ==
The talk show was created by the original team behind "More Talk More Happiness" (越策越开心). The impetus behind the creation of Day Day Up was that with the 'decline of traditional virtues and etiquette' in China leading up to the 21st Century, the show would play an active role in conveying traditional Chinese values to viewers. This would allow people to enjoy learning about Chinese traditions, especially of the arrival of the 2008 Beijing Olympic Games around the time of the show's release. It employs both the young and the old for its humorous hosts in order to convey Chinese traditional values.

== Pre-launch marketing ==
Prior to the release of the talk show, Hunan Television launched a series of marketing campaigns to increase the show's exposure. This was done through multiple 'prequel shows' (天天向上前传 or 'Day Day Up Prequels'). Starting from 8 August 2008, daily broadcasts of the show were shown to familiarise audience members with the format of the show and to raise interest towards the show's topics of discussion. In each of these episodes, there would be an opening show, six classes, and finally a talk from the 'Headmaster' (host of the show).

== During COVID-19 ==
During the coronavirus outbreak, in order to reduce the risks of being exposed to the virus, the show conducted a new format called "Cloud Filming" that allowed hosts and guests to film from their homes.

== List of episodes ==
=== 2008 ===
Date	Episode name
2008-08-04	郭冬临开讲语文课(一)
2008-08-05	郭冬临开讲语文课(二)
2008-08-06	郭冬临、何炅爆笑开课 白静俞灏明变“神经质”学生
2008-08-07	台湾少数民族
2008-09-12	美女讲师团“气质”培训 白静欧弟“丰收”大歌唱
2008-09-26	小小督导员
2008-10-03	中韩民族风情画卷
2008-10-10	亚洲天团“至上励合”
2008-10-17	无敌裴娜性感迷人
2008-10-24	说唱少年 白静
2008-10-31	张一山活宝技能全面爆发
2008-11-07	舞者剧组
2008-11-14	明日之星谷智鑫牛奶
2008-12-05	华语世界顶级声优大PK(一)
2008-12-12	音乐舞蹈连堂上 名校也PK
2008-12-19	华语世界顶级声优大PK(二)
2008-12-26	林保怡施妙手仁心

=== 2009 ===
Date	Episode name
2009-01-02	林保怡 广告明星
20090109期	巫启贤爆料欧弟暗恋贾静雯
20090116期	从玩世不恭到疯狂英语
20090206期	新春特辑
20090220期	男生排队追求李谷一
第20090227期	亚洲舞王挑斗街舞教练
第20090306期	武林高手之“霹雳娇娃”
第20090313期	名校PK 马可大闹现场
第20090320期	中美啦啦队PK“大战”
第20090327期	YOYO球冠军 巅峰对决
第20090327期	性感模特汇聚 视觉盛宴
第20090403期	“汉唐乐府”仿若梦回汉唐
第20090410期	广告模特秀演技欧弟被电晕
第20090417期	“华仔”与欧弟飚歌
第20090424期	雪七公然“索吻” 吓坏欧弟
第20090501期	世界佳丽齐聚《天天》
第20090508期	天天兄弟会“咏春”师傅
第20090508期	俞灏明欧弟拍mv玩“亲亲”
第20090515期	“天天”开绅士运动
第20090515期	高雅芭蕾“天天”受宠
第20090522期	各地体坛冠军云集《天天》
第20090522期	省博物馆登《天天》舞台
第20090529期	谷歌精英《天天》展风采
第20090529期	《天天》成踢踏舞“王国”
第20090605期	泰国天团August通杀中文歌
第20090605期	韩国练习生 rain的好朋友
第20090612期	汪涵欧弟演绎京剧经典戏段
第20090612期	B―box再现“天天”
第20090619期	party女王与欧弟贴身热舞
第20090619期	亚洲舞蹈教父曾向欧弟示爱
第20090626期	众“明星”传授消防知识
第20090626期	全国顶级封面模特
第20090703期	青年名旦云集天天
第20090703期	郭敬明携美女作家做客天天
第20090710期	天天兄弟挑战高雅音乐
第20090710期	“史上最牛”雅礼中学320班
第20090717期	“学长学姐”大联欢
第20090717期	杂技公主挑战欧弟手腕
第20090724期	北大清华才子秀歌喉
第20090724期	“天天”现场集体玩手鼓
第20090731期	羽泉空降先当搬运工再唱歌
第20090731期	欧弟“艳遇”不敌汪涵
第20090807期	汪涵欧弟上演惊悚实验
第20090807期	欧弟双手抱美女挑战大力士
第20090814期	《天天》“月球”主持节目
第20090814期	香港和台湾的消防救生员
第20090816期	走进国粹世界
第20090821期	姚晨、白静上演“约会吧”
第20090821期	泰国国剧+国民偶像
第20090821期	国家健美操队展冠军风采
第20090828期	天天偶像剧 灏明郑爽配对
第20090828期	最小“杰克逊”电晕全场
第20090904期	汪涵教你“谈情说爱”
第20090911期	台湾九球高手
第20090911期	中运会：少年群英会
第20090918期	李永波率爱徒做客天天向上
第20090918期	“桃李杯”舞蹈精英显绝技
第20090919期	Z18帅哥乘务员
第20090925期	世界真奇妙 绕着地球跑
第20090925期	2008精编版本(一)
第20090925期	湘女来访 主持人集体检讨
第20091002期	国际广播电台朋友来踢馆
第20091002期	能歌善舞朱明瑛
第20091009期	八一电影制片厂(下)
第20091009期	八一电影制片厂(上)
第20091016期	天天兄弟挑战高音
第20091016期	泰国天团 国民偶像
第20091016期	天天偶像剧 上演帅哥美女配
第20091023期	天天兄弟揭秘美国微软(上)
第20091023期	天天兄弟揭秘美国微软(下)
第20091030期	韩庚爆料想结婚
第20091030期	少年鼓号队
第20091106期	印度瑜伽驾临叫板天天兄弟
第20091106期	少年的迷恋 中国刑警学院
第20091113期	中超美女助理之性感足球宝贝
第20091113期	小村官 大世界
第20091120期	天天兄弟大战钢铁拔河队
第20091120期	天天兄弟练习少儿体操
第20091127期	日本动漫造访天天
第20091127期	天天兄弟搞笑军训
第20091204期	美国哈林花式篮球秀
第20091204期	全国十大杰出农民企业家
第20091211期	《天天》征兵营 新兵尽展英姿
第20091211期	朱丹惨遭欧弟“挖墙脚”
第20091218期	天天兄弟识百草 中医达人针灸浩二
第20091218期	狗狗聚总动员 《天天》闹翻天
第20091225期	希望工程造就快乐师生
第20091225期	圣诞之夜天籁童声降临

=== 2010 ===
Date	Episode name
第20100108期	帅气男主播自曝直播糗事
第20100108期	《天天》上演机器人大战
第20100115期	民间发明家会聚《天天》
第20100115期	美女模特秀绝世钻石
第20100122期	“见义勇为”正气汇聚《天天》
第20100122期	高跷少年施展“高空热舞”
第20100129期	英伦踢踏震撼《天天》
第20100129期	中国打工仔“打”出新天地
第20100205期	世纪佳缘 天天兄弟当月老
第20100205期	美国街舞达人VS小小少年
第20100212期	金嗓歌王费玉清金曲送祝福
第20100212期	星光四少与黑girl齐贺岁
第20100219期	混血美女陪天天兄弟过年
第20100219期	百度CEO《天天》热舞
第20100226期	养生怪杰老魏现场授课
第20100226期	《天天》汇聚青年才俊
第20100305期	老魏再度出山授养生绝招
第20100305期	韩庚师妹张力尹做客“天天”
第20100312期	名医齐聚天天展另类身手
第20100312期	中国棒球“五虎将”驾临
第20100319期	美女“剩斗士”整惨欧弟钱枫
第20100319期	“天天”开启亚洲之路 欲填新丁
第20100326期	巴黎天籁童声驾到 天天合唱团洋相百出
第20100326期	南湘雅不输北协和 揭开手术室秘密
第20100402期	美女总裁现场招婿
第20100402期	唇枪舌战“天天”南北名校大PK
第20100409期	“养生怪杰”魔药课堂香气四溢
第20100409期	“快乐淘宝”潮流网购带领时尚
第20100416期	天天兄弟化身精灵PK各界金领
第20100416期	名校美女成长课堂
第20100507期	三千佳丽们现身遭涵哥调侃
第20100507期	天才少年各出绝活力压天天兄弟
第20100514期	转笔、魔方鬼才空降天天
第20100514期	实习生七嘴八舌话办公室恋情
第20100521期	田源夫妇节目现场献荧幕初吻
第20100521期	黄冈勤奋尖子生分享学习传奇故事
第20100528期	汪涵杨乐乐“天天”牵手秀甜蜜
第20100528期	十二乐坊团体矛盾大爆料
第20100604期	快男海星飙高音叫板天天兄弟
第20100604期	浪漫花语 天天向上香气四溢
第20100611期	风云未婚男青年引万人尖叫
第20100611期	比基尼佳丽泳装秀 欧弟小五大饱“艳福”
第20100618期	顶级组合winds.首登中国电视节目 惊爆不断
第20100618期	留学风云：考取美国顶尖名校秘籍
第20100625期	姜续昌钱枫肚皮舞PK 灏明再回快男比赛
第20100625期	中央音乐学院附中驾临 大提琴美女陶醉全场
第20100702期	科学小怪人整蛊天天兄弟
第20100702期	韩寒师弟师妹“斗智”汪涵欧弟
第20100709期	乐乐汪涵世界杯之旅 天天兄弟南非游学
第20100709期	“明星辣妈”亲身传授保养瘦身育儿经
第20100716期	天天兄弟游学记之南非之旅
第20100716期	天天兄弟游学记之欧美之旅
第20100723期	高晓松宋柯重温无悔音乐之路
第20100723期	巨星的摇篮北京电影学院毕业班
第20100730期	足球名嘴来袭 汪涵解说爆笑连连
第20100730期	钱枫“烧烤妆”喜迎宝莱坞美女
第20100806期	天天兄弟与选秀选手PK舞技
第20100806期	宋柯高晓松支招音乐新秀
第20100813期	民间老手艺 传统绝技大开眼
第20100813期	天天兄弟与“演演戏”谈情说戏
第20100820期	早安少女自曝男友标准 钱枫受其“偏爱”
第20100820期	最酷Hiphop团体律动“天天向上”
第20100827期	华语乐坛“极品老男人”齐秦、陈升
第20100827期	华语乐坛姐弟神话 齐秦 齐豫
第20100903期	京剧男生帅到惊人 表演劈腿欧弟败下阵
第20100903期	天天兄弟大玩真人版《植物大战僵尸》
第20100917期	体操王子李小鹏宣布正式退役
第20100917期	体操名将现场大秀绝技
第20100924期	周董携神秘嘉宾做客 全明星阵容豪华登场
第20100924期	周杰伦客串主持挑战天天兄弟
第20101001期	天天兄弟怪异演绎高凌风经典《冬天的一把火》
第20101001期	情歌皇后高胜美重唱《千年等一回》
第20101008期	“国宝熊猫守护使”亮相天天
第20101008期	全国大学生职商挑战赛
第20101022期	高晓松宋柯重温无悔音乐之路(精编版)
第20101022期	天家第一村大PK 天下名村齐聚“论剑”
第20101029期	基层普查员现场与天天兄弟比拼口才
第20101029期	网络红人齐聚天天向上大秀绝活
第20101105期	杂技天团惊艳登场汪涵模仿感叹
第20101105期	杂技天团惊艳登场钱枫被吊空中
第20101119期	韩国《JUMP》现场爆笑演出
第20101119期	最牛寝室扎堆汪涵大学兄弟重聚
第20101126期	民间舞放光彩 兄弟们学舞“乱套”
第20101126期	中国舞蹈界巨匠现身星光熠熠
第20101203期	碧昂斯幕后制作人亮相天天 欧弟变身好学生
第20101203期	麻辣教师热辣开讲高效学习法
第20101210期	搞笑QQ表情齐扎堆
第20101210期	中国气象主播大揭秘
第20101217期	情歌天王互揭老底 伍思凯“后悔”写歌给阿哲
第20101217期	音乐DJ点评三大情歌天王 称张信哲是“偷心贼”
第20101224期	天天兄弟玩转极限运动
第20101224期	亚运武术冠军团教国术

=== 2011 ===
Date	Episode name
第20110107期	天天兄弟现场学舞 爆笑大乱套
第20110107期	中国舞蹈巨匠齐聚一堂
第20110114期	中国版苏珊大妈力证凡人成就梦想
第20110114期	RTA劲歌热舞嗨翻天天舞台
第20110121期	世界舞蹈嘉年华 欧弟钱枫环抱女观众
第20110121期	世界舞蹈嘉年华
第20110128期	天天兄弟带你走进中国特种兵
第20110128期	谷智鑫熊抱女主角 天天兄弟艳羡不已
第20110211期	兔年新春特别节目(一)
第20110211期	兔年新春特别节目(二)
第20110218期	汪涵华丽转身奢华上演
第20110218期	俄罗斯邻家小孩天天舞台大拜年
第20110225期	世界名校校花大联谊 天天兄弟大献殷勤
第20110225期	钟汉良人气高 被女影迷强抱
第20110304期	中华老字号“瑞蚨祥”闪亮登场
第20110304期	星二代齐聚 各曝自家趣事
第20110311期	民族顶级校花语出惊人爆笑全场
第20110311期	海外学子齐聚一堂分享游学奇妙经历
第20110318期	入殓师登综艺节目挑战极限话题
第20110318期	励志行业美女分享传奇经历和成功经验
第20110325期	汪涵“义女”变身旗袍美女 珠光宝气诠释摩登时代
第20110325期	两岸清华同学相聚“天天”畅聊登山趣事
第20110401期	郝邵文释小龙经典再现
第20110401期	两会美女代表齐聚 “智斗”天天兄弟
第20110408期	评书大师VS主持策神 口风对决
第20110408期	潮人单田芳给汪涵“开脸”
第20110415期	民族舞VS古典舞 巅峰对决
第20110415期	行业精英型男魅力登场
第20110422期	LA街舞少年劲酷表演秀
第20110422期	校园风云 国民校草PK天天兄弟
第20110429期	影视圈“潜力股”现场秀演技
第20110429期	中华美少女讲习所
第20110506期	理工科美眉闪亮登场
第20110506期	大师梅葆玖秀惊艳绝技
第20110513期	外国主播做客 天天兄弟变身猛男
第20110513期	王子驾到 北欧男模人气爆棚
第20110520期	大学生了没VS爱笑会议室
第20110520期	俄罗斯国家艺术体操队
第20110527期	音乐少年莅临现场 欧弟为美女“抓狂”
第20110527期	国际范天才控汇聚一堂
第20110603期	校园情侣热恋潮 汪涵欧弟现场获“表白”
第20110603期	离婚典礼也“疯狂”
第20110610期	郑恺现场被整与骁骁kiss借位
第20110610期	天天兄弟全程护航橱窗公主
第20110617期	红色青春剧主演踢馆报到
第20110617期	昔日童星成长的烦恼
第20110624期	影视剧小正太帅气秀演技
第20110624期	萌系广告小美女遭天天兄弟索吻
第20110701期	欧弟现场遭花旦“表白”
第20110708期	现场爱意四射 上演无国界爱情
第20110708期	RTA携首张专辑来袭活力上档
第20110710期	军中花旦激情红歌大献唱
第20110715期	快女做客与天天兄弟大演对手戏
第20110715期	师生齐聚分享快乐学习的秘招
第20110722期	汪涵妙语逗乐谢安琪
第20110722期	鲜族医生对阵康巴型男
第20110729期	型男马天宇童年生活大揭秘
第20110729期	外交官分享夫妻相处之道
第20110805期	萧蔷、温碧霞比拼争艳
第20110805期	南北包子大PK
第20110812期	新星二代再度来访
第20110812期	最帅女飞行员宋寅秒杀全场
第20110812期	帅气女生与天天兄弟斗嘴
第20110826期	最美女博士惊艳亮相
第20110826期	新晋女星畅谈奋斗之路
第20110902期	龅牙哥、茫然弟现场pk雷技
第20110902期	白雪携军花甜美来袭
第20110909期	美女CEO席卷“天天”
第20110909期	天天兄弟南非之旅
第20110923期	亚洲广告花美男帅气来袭
第20110923期	俞敏洪徐小平大秀幽默魅力
第20110930期	国足老将 美丽谈笑回首征程
第20110930期	央视名嘴 别样解说笑傲开坛
第20111007期	双生姐妹花 携手惊艳派对
第20111007期	天天兄弟“细品面条”不淡定
第20111014期	严宽现场“表白”林心如
第20111014期	林心如洪小铃现场幽默互动
第20111021期	潮男张朝阳浪漫献唱情歌
第20111021期	山村帅哥玩转运动极限
第20111028期	灵魂舞者黄豆豆
第20111028期	最美白领京城名媛
第20111104期	体育系帅哥活力大比拼
第20111104期	“天天兄弟”戴花集体扮萌
第20111111期	音乐剧《妈妈咪呀》现场重现
第20111111期	李泉胡彦斌王啸坤齐现身玩音乐
第20111118期	朴信惠超可爱舞蹈大教学
第20111118期	陈翔武艺曝“同居”趣事
第20111125期	各路明星秀出人生B计划
第20111125期	沙排名将演绎多面人生
第20111202期	“欧弟”突来现场 引粉丝尖叫
第20111202期	步步惊心“歌红人不红”
第20111209期	江映蓉携妈妈分享家庭趣闻
第20111209期	李湘王岳伦首度同台
第20111216期	天天兄弟演爆笑版皮影戏
第20111216期	格斗硬汉现场残酷对决
第20111223期	听时代在唱歌“桦式”唱腔授课
第20111223期	翻唱红人首登荧屏 中西无国界
第20111230期	欧弟惊喜回归张国立邓婕秀恩爱
第20111230期	李湘携江铠同宣传新剧

=== 2012 ===
Date	Episode name
第20120106期	美丽女高管大秀火辣身材
第20120106期	欧弟惊艳献唱全新单曲
第20120113期	“麻辣女兵”铿锵来袭
第20120113期	90后新兵唱“流行版”军歌
第20120120期	南北火锅庆团圆天天兄弟齐拜年
第20120120期	音乐王子奏响新年乐章
第20120127期	2011年度最受欢迎女嘉宾集锦(下)
第20120127期	2011年度最受欢迎女嘉宾集锦(上)
第20120203期	2011年度最受欢迎男嘉宾集锦(下)
第20120203期	2011年度最受欢迎男嘉宾集锦(上)
第20120210期	沙宝亮黄渤细说成名前后
第20120210期	五大名校学子才艺大比拼
第20120217期	《深宫谍影》主演互爆拍戏“猛料”
第20120217期	“视帝视后”探讨夫妻相处之道
第20120224期	辩论高手大胆“挑衅”汪涵
第20120224期	IT女神性感形象大颠覆
第20120302期	最帅钳工与欧弟斗舞
第20120302期	美女空姐大爆明星乘机趣闻
第20120309期	混血童星卖萌 亲吻粉丝惹尖叫
第20120309期	彬彬家族放飞童真爆笑全场
第20120316期	泰国最帅女人Zee与汪涵比帅
第20120316期	三大民乐大师奏响天籁
第20120323期	天才少女大展音乐天赋
第20120323期	名企掌门人畅谈成功秘笈
第20120330期	吴镇宇李克勤做客 都爱湖南辣
第20120330期	“中华老字号”体验香港风情
第20120406期	蔡依林曝期待步入婚姻殿堂
第20120406期	韩庚带伤录“天天”
第20120413期	“亚洲飞人”现场浪漫求婚
第20120413期	校园奇葩比拼鬼马才艺
第20120420期	国际名校中华学子出征记
第20120420期	中美少年才艺大PK
第20120427期	美国正太萝莉火辣热舞串烧秀
第20120427期	音乐之声合唱团重唱经典
第20120430期	“五一”天天向上精编版(二)
第20120430期	“五一”天天向上精编版(一)
第20120501期	“五一”天天向上精编版(四)
第20120501期	“五一”天天向上精编版(三)
第20120504期	热血教师现场模仿表情帝
第20120504期	奇葩主持班热辣挑战
第20120511期	王小帅曝拍摄幕后
第20120511期	丁一宇中国电视首秀
第20120518期	凤凰传奇演绎最炫民族风
第20120518期	文艺女邂逅理工男
第20120525期	顶级音乐家斗琴合奏嗨翻全场
第20120525期	天天兄弟激情斗舞钢管舞权威
第20120601期	武侠七大掌门一决高下
第20120601期	芭蕾公主侯宏澜分享美丽事业
第20120608期	情歌王子品冠重温经典情歌
第20120608期	Mike隋另类模仿即兴逗乐
第20120615期	赵文卓曝独家“奶爸”秘籍
第20120615期	名嘴乐嘉舌战天天兄弟
第20120623期	名师辣嘴曲家瑞畅聊感情趣事
第20120623期	世界滑板冠军秀超炫后空翻
第20120629期	钟汉良展绝密刀法
第20120629期	世界顶级coser齐聚解奥秘
第20120706期	世界大厨打造最香舞台（下）
第20120706期	胡歌美食当前变吃货（上）
第20120713期	欧弟献花告白娜扎（下）
第20120713期	白凯南贾玲秀最炫民族风（上）
第20120720期	“最萌法师”曝走红内幕(下)
第20120720期	陈乔恩刘诗诗同台比美(上)
第20120727期	万元高薪奇特新职业大分享
第20120728期	达人现场传授搭讪绝招
第20120803期	顶级保镖精彩格斗暴力美学
第20120803期	世界顶级保镖空降天天
第20120810期	选美小姐华丽来袭
第20120810期	陈小锐畅聊考港大曲折经历
第20120817期	辛晓琪诠释温暖情歌（下）
第20120817期	帅气蒋劲夫获辛晓琪青睐（上）
第20120824期	欧弟与曲婉婷深情合唱
第20120824期	“麻辣女兵”紧急集合（上）
第20120831期	汤镇业双胞胎儿子爆老爸嗜好
第20120831期	艾尚真大秀火辣身材
第20120915期	陈一冰再谈“娜冰恋”
第20120915期	张继科天天秀歌喉视谢娜为女友标准
第20120921期	天生反骨豪门之女如何独闯江湖
第20120921期	天天兄弟对碰中国最好声音（上）
第20120928期	个性教练回应“学车潜规则”
第20120928期	李春波黄鹤翔王子遗憾不懂炒作
第20121005期	至上励合重组出发首秀新歌
第20121005期	当红女主持齐聚大战天天兄弟
第20121012期	金牌经纪人曝明星秘闻趣事
第20121012期	贾静雯欧弟大曝“姐弟情”
第20121019期	郑多莲涵涵教学“逆生长”秘籍
第20121019期	汪涵刘仪伟PK川菜秀厨艺
第20121026期	奇葩“体操帝”另类PK
第20121026期	“女王”驾到自曝成功秘诀
第20121101期	梁翘柏优雅声线惊艳天天
第20121102期	重温经典回忆白衣飘飘的年代
第20121102期	高晓松叶蓓老狼忆难忘校园歌曲
第20121109期	天津“狗不理”包子的诱惑
第20121109期	中华老字号瑞蚨祥闪亮登场
第20121116期	两地方言发音人会师涵哥
第20121116期	四大至尊声优齐聚发声
第20121123期	四大名醋齐聚 汪涵现场豪饮名醋(下)
第20121123期	汪涵传朱丹邱启明“芒果秘籍”
第20121130期	天天兄弟大展厨艺
第20121130期	戴春荣首谈婆媳话题
第20121207期	蔡少芬挺大肚为老公伴舞
第20121207期	林志玲“强吻”欧弟
第20121214期	胡彦斌遭美女热情表白
第20121214期	最美味南粉北面大集结
第20121221期	吴宗宪“踢走”天天兄弟
第20121221期	汪涵扎小辫携手大兵跨界演双簧
第20121228期	杨钰莹毛宁金童玉女再续前缘
第20121228期	甘萍汪涵逗趣演绎“刘海砍樵”

=== 2013 ===
Date	Episode name
第20130104期	俞灏明回归主持天天7兄弟聚首
第20130104期	《爱在春天》主创齐亮相
第20130104期	俞灏明回归主持天天7兄弟聚首
第20130111期	李静戴军现场澄清十年感情之路
第20130111期	钱枫海上流浪
第20130111期	李静戴军现场澄清十年感情之路
第20130111期	钱枫海上流浪
第20130118期	林夕趣聊大明星好友
第20130118期	张卫健遭“老婆们”大爆料
第20130118期	林夕趣聊大明星好友
第20130118期	张卫健遭“老婆们”大爆料
第20130125期	黄子佼谈坎坷明星路
第20130125期	精英宅男高科技恋爱
第20130125期	黄子佼谈坎坷明星路
第20130125期	精英宅男高科技恋爱
第20130201期	IT大佬周鸿祎舌战天天兄弟
第20130201期	边防战士科普大考验
第20130208期	龚宇幽默调侃周鸿祎
第20130208期	陈乔恩变“萌妹子”
第20130215期	贾静雯上演三秒飙泪精湛演技
第20130215期	欧弟抱林志玲借位接吻惊艳全场
第20130222期	黄渤曝曾为王菲写歌
第20130222期	吴宗宪尽展主持绝技
第20130301期	倪萍“恶语”痛损赵忠祥
第20130301期	助手大爆倪萍糊涂趣事
第20130308期	歌手吐槽被忽悠来参赛
第20130308期	歌手们出道前职业揭秘
第20130315期	耿乐畅聊拍戏趣事
第20130315期	李小冉另类爱好遭吐槽
第20130322期	柳岩曝欧弟是白马王子
第20130322期	揭秘网络作家的逆袭之路
第20130329期	“我是歌手”五强齐聚
第20130329期	金牌制作人揭邀请歌手尴尬趣事
第20130405期	穿越古今“神配音”季冠霖
第20130405期	金马金钟金曲御用司仪
第20130419期	傅琰东父子魔术大揭秘
第20130419期	丁建中现场“切割”钱枫
第20130503期	唐嫣首谈与邱泽分手
第20130503期	杨幂与农民制作人飙戏
第20130510期	最美护士传授护理密招分
第20130517期	段子王戴军、瞿颖分享奇葩糗事
第20130517期	周笔畅曝光05级超女小秘密
第20130524期	迪克牛仔获狂热表白
第20130531期	杨宗纬“初爱”女生亮相
第20130607期	名校食堂上演巅峰对决
第20130614期	摇滚狂潮席卷天天
第20130621期	章子怡拳打视觉大师叶锦添
第20130628期	最强音12强专场
第20130705期	林志颖畅聊青春梦想
第20130712期	天天有喜女演员遭鄙视
第20130719期	陈小春欧弟尬舞
第20130726期	秦海璐携众考生畅聊高考记忆
第20130802期	女明星授传奇创业经
第20130809期	中华名医揭秘中西医秘籍
第20130816期	快男爆梦中情人
第20130823期	快男8强PK吴建豪大秀广场舞
第20130830期	黑狼教官率快男展开魔鬼训练
第20130906期	天天兄弟大闹迪士尼
第20130913期	郭富城扁嘴卖萌变表情帝
第20130920期	汪涵主持钱枫刘庭羽婚礼
第20130927期	明星外籍主席萌大卫
第20131004期	“神十”80后最美青工
第20131011期	监狱警花霸气登场
第20131018期	王岳伦田亮现场为女儿梳头发
第20131025期	美女驾到 雷佳阿兰麦迪娜斗艳
第20131101期	三大民医分享私家治病秘方
第20131108期	阳光女神王珞丹综艺首秀
第20131115期	杨丽萍携8大杨家弟子亮相天天
第20131122期	孔卡恋爱史 神奇脚法引人膜拜
第20131129期	江珊和乐乐抢汪涵
第20131206期	天天兄弟普及出国旅游手续
第20131213期	张智霖袁咏仪内地综艺首秀
第20131220期	高圆圆曾因赵又廷与黄海波吵架
第20131227期	秦岚领衔广告大咖来袭

=== 2014 ===
Date	Episode name
第20140103期	杨钰莹力荐年货 腾格尔卖萌
第20140111期	最美西施安以轩变身无敌吃货
第20140117期	快男三强合体
第20140124期	锦荣帅气空降 大张伟告白李湘
第20140131期	韦唯携三子大拜年 笔笔认干妈
第20140208期	美声届名师高徒齐聚阵
第20140221期	莫小棋玩转“天天主持”
第20140228期	王铮亮文薇畅谈恋爱趣事
第20140307期	姜昆朗诵《妈妈》感动全场
第20140314期	萌叔韩磊惊艳演绎霹雳舞
第20140321期	海关制服诱惑
第20140328期	曹格金曲串烧
第20140411期	柏林影帝廖凡王者归来
第20140418期	男神吴彦祖张家辉秀腹肌
第20140425期	王潮歌导演震撼来袭
第20140502期	徐铮撞脸汪涵似双胞胎
第20140509期	天天兄弟玩Rap
第20140516期	陈汉典细数配角心酸事
第20140523期	汪涵刘涛现场PK厨艺
第20140530期	童话里的儿童节
第20140606期	鬼才音乐家谭盾来袭
第20140613期	特色美女性感来袭引主持人内讧
第20140620期	许晴曝和花花有缘跟刘涛合不来
第20140627期	CNBLUE内地首秀变吃货
第20140704期	羞涩顾长卫大赞蒋雯丽
第20140711期	江浙美女多陆毅携妻女幸福登场
第20140718期	姐姐强吻韩国小正太
第20140725期	杨阳洋为多多狼性爆发
第20140801期	吴镇宇秀精湛刀工
第20140808期	韩红汪涵爆笑上演脱口秀大战
第20140815期	郭涛石头父子档爆笑斗鸡
第20140822期	“新声代”小鲜肉遭遇友情考验
第20140829期	真假村长爆笑拼才艺
第20140905期	钟丽缇Nana两代女神运动会
第20140912期	陈浩民现场补办蒙古婚礼
第20140919期	贝儿多多奇思妙想玩晕天天兄弟
第20140926期	体育冠军爸爸大聚会
第20141003期	曹格华晨宇的音乐专场
第20141017期	刘惜君领衔深圳美女清纯来袭
第20141024期	贺兰钧美容布道遭现代医师完爆
第20141031期	李菲儿聊新欢 宋佳被表白
第20141107期	李宇春耍酷卖萌疯玩
第20141114期	张慧雯大曝张艺谋片场囧事
第20141121期	汪涵牵线网球名将彭帅钱枫相亲
第20141128期	北大民谣女神李荣浩唱羞观众
第20141205期	最强老师天团绝技大比拼
第20141212期	神嘉宾带炸弹现场炸钱枫
第20141219期	颖儿为美食宁弃男朋友
第20141226期	TFBOYS上阵挑战鲍春来

=== 2015 ===
Date	Episode name
第20150102期	邓紫棋挺林俊杰上歌手
第20150109期	筷子兄弟聊小苹果创作故事飙泪
第20150116期	吴亦凡有颜任性秀才艺
第20150123期	孙楠与瞿颖四角恋扯不清
第20150130期	中韩舞团任性斗舞欧豪帅气参战
第20150206期	黄绮珊赵传致经典 胡彦斌征婚
第20150213期	“女人帮”踢馆PK韩红互爆料
第20150220期	华晨宇求“女友”
第20150227期	李健变段子手尽情活宝
第20150306期	四大歌姬高音比拼
第20150313期	吕燕狂吐槽 韩磊最爱李荣浩
第20150320期	郑淳元受情伤变歌王
第20150403期	伍佰与信同台飙高音
第20150410期	少年赵默笙致敬古巨基凌乱跑调
第20150417期	凤凰传奇拆台闹不和？
第20150424期	小阿毛颜值爆表叫板前任
第20150501期	五一来当兵 谁是真男人
第20150508期	崔永元黄西对战脱口秀
第20150515期	任天野秀身材完爆小鲜肉
第20150522期	张丰毅拆台真男兄弟
第20150529期	“二姐”张歆艺自黑太逗趣”
第20150605期	郭晓东夫妻温情献唱
第20150612期	风云毕业生上演戛纳“花被单”秀
第20150619期	张静初变女汉子猛揍钱枫
第20150626期	成龙现场“黑”房祖名
第20150703期	神经乃爸贾乃亮黑甜馨飚哭戏
第20150710期	超能辣妈张庭、钟丽缇来啦
第20150717期	汪涵何炅合体秀恩爱
第20150724期	邹明轩抖肉热舞找姐姐
第20150731期	Poppy炼成全民女神
第20150807期	康总疯狂吐槽老爸 形象尽失
第20150814期	黄子韬自曝情史现场表白
第20150821期	张柏芝回应整容
第20150828期	马东踢馆与汪涵爆笑舌战
第20150911期	宋智孝高调示爱姜Gary
第20150920期	宋承宪深情表白刘亦菲
第20150925期	“天王杀手”周华健畅聊武侠梦
第20151002期	苏炳添隐私遭挖被“围观”
第20151009期	王祖蓝李亚男夫妇花式秀恩爱
第20151016期	不老偶像蔡国庆杨钰莹世纪合体
第20151023期	Rain自曝心中女神是唐嫣
第20151030期	欧弟梦幻婚礼娇妻曝光
第20151106期	靳东王凯手撕天天兄弟
第20151113期	影后周迅萌哭众人
第20151120期	胖轩叫板克雷格上演拳击之战
第20151127期	佟大为携“一年级”青春来袭
第20151204期	亚冠冠军恒大献综艺首秀
第20151211期	陈坤攀亲戚认汪涵妹夫
第20151218期	杨洋青涩军装照曝光
第20151225期	欧文孙继海另类头球大比拼

=== 2016 ===
Date	Episode name
第20160101期	陈思诚王宝强齐“探案”
第20160108期	冯小刚遭张歆艺性感“色诱”
第20160115期	黄绮珊麻辣拆台天天小兄弟
第20160122期	欧弟“产后复出”
第20160129期	郑恺花式撩妹技能满分
第20160205期	小五惨痛经历曝光跪别《天天》
第20160212期	古力娜扎聊吻戏狂虐单身汪
第20160219期	杨紫琼卖萌撒娇聊婚期
第20160226期	段子手大张伟实力抖包袱
第20160304期	赵薇爆料《还珠》秘史
第20160311期	中国巴西健美冠军美艳比拼
第20160318期	张雨绮壁咚郑容和CP感十足
第20160325期	“国民岳父”韩寒表白Tfboys
第20160401期	吴亦凡携刘雯养眼走秀
第20160415期	天天兄弟现场遭“修理”
第20160422期	欧弟曝退出内幕现场落泪
第20160429期	Twins合体撩汉力MAX
第20160506期	杜海涛沈梦辰隔空被催生
第20160513期	大张伟遭遇公主抱
第20160520期	二次元网红踢馆天天实力撩妹
第20160527期	空姐曝为大张伟服务的特殊经历
第20160603期	张信哲自称收藏狂热粉
第20160610期	大张伟模仿李云迪超尴尬
第20160617期	汪涵郑钧为崽“下厨”
第20160624期	陈汉典郭采洁上演激情“互咚”
第20160701期	吴磊变身帅气快递员现场派件
第20160708期	陈学冬颖儿秒变手工帝
第20160715期	蒋梦婕狂野“腿咚”徐上士
第20160722期	陈乔恩弃女神包袱疯狂开吃
第20160729期	国民初恋林依晨大办水果趴
第20160805期	邹明轩兄弟组团卖萌
第20160812期	白娘子小青催泪聚首
第20160819期	沙溢胡可疯狂撸串儿
第20160902期	王子文刘烨携《追凶者也》来袭
第20160909期	马龙蔡依林牵手献唱
第20160916期	“铁榔头”郎平惊艳开唱
第20160923期	李荣浩杨宗纬实力助阵致敬前辈
第20160930期	蔡国庆ALin林志炫献歌祖国
第20161007期	马龙力邀张继科挤身网红界
第20161014期	五月天金曲串烧引泪奔
第20161021期	阚清子江映蓉花式告白男神信
第20161028期	陈楚生携新歌闪亮归来
第20161104期	女神秦岚张静初现场相亲
第20161111期	女神佘诗曼现场表白汪涵
第20161118期	柳岩甜蜜配对陈楚河
第20161125期	大胃王张俪现场支招苗条秘籍
第20161202期	张艺兴秀舞艺撩妹技能全开
第20161209期	张含韵自嘲“微胖界一霸”
第20161216期	蒋梦婕黄绮珊比拼奇葩饮食经历
第20161223期	闫妮回忆青涩感情史
第20161230期	包贝尔厨神附身与贾玲再度合体

=== 2017 ===
Date	Episode name	Starring
第20170106期	维密天使奚梦瑶变身豆皮超模	奚梦瑶、黄嘉千
第20170113期	周笔畅新歌首秀热力开嗓	周笔畅、潘石屹
第20170120期	大张伟钱枫玩转舞龙	魏晨、阿雅
第20170210期	白客模仿易中天嗨唱大张伟神曲	白客、易烊千玺
第20170217期	王一博关晓彤热舞甜蜜发糖	关晓彤、任素汐
第20170224期	王一博董力上演“美男击剑赛”	何洁、颖儿、岳云鹏
第20170303期	李玟王一博“姐弟组合”激情热舞	李玟、董明珠
第20170310期	杨迪白凯南组团搞事情	杨迪、白凯南、孙怡
第20170317期	徐静蕾黄立行甜蜜撒狗粮	徐静蕾、黄立行、明道
第20170324期	王一博大张伟踏春萌态十足	许婧、王子川
第20170331期	娄艺潇携手钱枫约会桃花谷	娄艺潇、张海宇、韩红
第20170407期	宋祖儿“祥林嫂模式”吐槽王一博	宋祖儿、王鸥
第20170414期	董子健大开“坑妈模式”曝囧料”	董子健、梅婷
第20170421期	杨千嬅隔空喊话余文乐	杨千嬅、余文乐
第20170428期	迪玛希暖心献花周冬雨	迪玛希、周冬雨、关晓彤
第20170505期	“青年文明号”献礼五四青年节	—
第20170512期	何猷君陈碧舸结缘天天书屋	何猷君、陈碧舸、张泉灵
第20170519期	刘芸马可大送端午节福利	刘芸、马可
第20170526期	张馨予畅谈外卖趣事	张馨予、“外卖军团”
第20170602期	张大大长高只服增高鞋垫	张大大、杨云
第20170609期	天天兄弟拜师学京剧	—
第20170616期	张碧晨发际线被吐槽怒怼网友	张碧晨、 张大大
第20170623期	三大精英企业玩转团建新花样	—
第20170630期	张智霖香港街头变最帅导游	张智霖、周笔畅
第20170707期	范冰冰李晨秀恩爱疯狂撒糖	范冰冰、李晨
第20170714期	胡可迟帅续前缘引爆“回忆杀”	胡可、迟帅、张雪迎
第20170721期	流口水的夜市美食季来啦！	张歆艺、王鸥、娄艺潇
第20170728期	黄奕康复首秀尽显吃货本色	黄奕、 王彦霖
第20170804期	谭松韵熊梓淇超粉红互喂	谭松韵、熊梓淇、王鸥
第20170811期	张若昀为长沙美食打call	张若昀、袁姗姗
第20170818期	环保大使周迅传递“绿色能量”	周迅
第20170825期	高颜值警察齐聚一堂	欧阳超
第20170901期	唐艺昕曝与张若昀的甜蜜恋爱史	唐艺昕、牛骏峰、宁静
第20170908期	嘻哈老师鬼卞RAP秀嗨翻全场	鬼卞、王子璇
第20170915期	卢靖姗曝《战狼2》惊险幕后	卢靖姗
第20170922期	消防精英上演现实版《烈火雄心》	—
第20170929期	《辉煌中国》主创讲述幕后故事	—
第20171006期	配音大咖震撼来袭	毛晓彤
第20171013期	易烊千玺关晓彤同框	易烊千玺、关晓彤
第20171020期	安以轩金晨化身“秋宝宝”	安以轩、金晨、柳岩
第20171027期	最帅快男团化身美食学长登场	魏巡
第20171103期	韩雪变美厨娘展“摊饼”绝技	韩雪、潘粤明
第20171110期	毛不易亮相惊艳原创惹众人痴迷	毛不易
第20171117期	纪凌尘阚清子深情拥吻甜蜜发酵	纪凌尘、阚清子、陈翔
第20171124期	二胡组合现场“围猎”	胡歌、胡兵
第20171201期	吴尊刘畊宏“爸爸力”大比拼	吴尊、刘畊宏、阿拉蕾、哈琳
第20171208期	00后小戏骨团队重现《红楼梦》	—
第20171215期	天天兄弟上演“拳力的游戏”	娄艺潇、张拉娜
第20171222期	关晓彤与维密模特大秀美腿	关晓彤、黄轩
第20171229期	吴君如宋丹丹演技爆发逗乐不停	

=== 2018 ===
Date	Episode name
第20180105期	00后萌妹上演超强飞花令
第20180112期	黄雅莉化身厨神技能全开
第20180119期	王栎鑫披棉被秀抗寒神技
第20180126期	宋威龙帅气来袭秀武术功底
第20180202期	德云社过招汪涵上演“唇枪舌战”
第20180209期	张若昀欢度小年夜放肆吃
第20180223期	天天兄弟携手祖海欢唱春晚神曲
第20180309期	魏巡焦迈奇串烧春晚金曲
第20180316期	邓亚萍高敏合体再现燃情时刻
第20180323期	袁娅维颠覆演绎“白骨精”
第20180330期	倪萍领衔三代中国女主持同台
第20180406期	最美瑶女郎陈德容上演回忆杀
第20180413期	汪涵自曝曾错失一个亿
第20180422期	张靓颖忆童年金句频出
第20180430期	配音演员“叶修”阿杰对战韩雪
第20180506期	南派三叔做客亲定选角
第20180513期	邓莎首曝老公赞助内幕惊呆汪涵
第20180520期	坤音四子爆笑演绎土味情话
第20180527期	洪欣实力护夫回应“抠门”指控
第20180603期	胡兵瞿颖首度合体诉说当年往事
第20180610期	SNH48黄婷婷程潇吐槽爸妈装修
第20180617期	科技女神韩雪现场拷问建筑师
第20180624期	蔡徐坤搭档邓男子上演魔术秀
第20180701期	骆文博王一博现场切磋舞艺
第20180708期	“杉菜”沈月携新F4闪亮登场
第20180715期	李子璇花式表白汪涵
第20180722期	汪苏泷为钱枫打造首支单曲
第20180729期	大张伟被爆料“惹哭”王菲？
第20180805期	王一博神速学舞展惊人天赋
第20180812期	“十周年”新老天天兄弟再聚首
第20180819期	“天天四小花”探索边境宝藏
第20180826期	王媛可官鸿助阵明星真相团
第20180902期	华晨宇李诞反套路寻找伪装者
第20180909期	罗志祥变身“逻辑强”惊艳全场
第20180916期	王一博徐海乔现场PK跳式跷跷板
第20180923期	孙杨如约“加入”天天兄弟！
第20181007期	王茂蕾陶昕然同台飚演技
第20181014期	卢靖姗艾伦讲述暖心宠物故事
第20181021期	张艺兴暖心分享成长故事
第20181028期	李湘王岳伦夫妻变“金句CP”
第20181104期	陈建斌秒变呆萌版“吃货大叔”
第20181111期	曾毅现场取经捆螃蟹
第20181118期	薛凯琪杨钰莹分享“泡面回忆”
第20181125期	探访“玫瑰之国”保加利亚
第20181202期	初代偶像张瑜亮相掀怀旧潮
第20181209期	蔡澜陈晓卿现场谈“食”论道
第20181216期	“超凡少年团”脑力比拼
第20181223期	成方圆张蔷用音乐致敬美好时代

=== 2019 ===
Date	Episode name
第20190101期	郭晓东程莉莎甜蜜拌嘴
第20190106期	潘粤明王鸥徐海乔变身呆萌侦探
第20190113期	袁咏仪带队PK兄弟团
第20190120期	武艺霍尊郭麒麟组“国风团”
第20190127期	尤长靖费启鸣变“花”样男子
第20190203期	杨千嬅安插“卧底”迷惑众人
第20190210期	ONER挑战天天四子默契考验
第20190217期	汪苏泷杨迪带你体验家乡的宝藏
第20190224期	海边小仙女姜妍安利大连海鲜
第20190303期	潘粤明马丽组“逆袭团”来挑战
第20190310期	武艺李子璇“约会”浏阳
第20190317期	林彦俊小鬼“宜春”寻春之旅
第20190324期	黄明昊解密温州“商城”之谜
第20190331期	凤凰传奇探秘鄂尔多斯赛车小镇
第20190407期	袁姗姗寻找襄阳宝藏“伪装者”
第20190414期	忘川夫妇合体发糖品常德美食
第20190421期	陈都灵吉克隽逸致敬中国航天人
第20190428期	白举纲沈梦辰感受绵阳科技城
第20190504期	贾乃亮江一燕携手献礼“五四”
第20190512期	刘宇宁携“拜师团”走进安顺
第20190519期	多警种青春训练营热血开营
第20190526期	李凯馨约会钢铁直男王一博
第20190602期	周震南率《创造营》酷炫来袭
第20190609期	“假笑男孩”综艺首秀萌翻全场
第20190616期	王一博即兴表演无实物骑摩托
第20190623期	威神V穿花盆鞋跳动感舞蹈
第20190630期	闫妮携《少年派》剧组来袭
第20190707期	董又霖害羞约会梦中情人金晨
第20190714期	《声入人心》第二季小哥哥亮相
第20190721期	钟丽缇王黎雯挑战婆婆底线
第20190728期	肖战、刘宇宁、张碧晨燃炸来袭
第20190804期	朱桢高天鹤“天朱组合”在线吃鸭 王一博杨迪爆笑吃播
第20190811期	吴宣仪戚薇组小龙虾姐妹花 王鹤棣王一博爆笑垃圾分类
第20190818期	王一博厨艺首秀 吴宣仪李子璇开启夏日凉菜大赏
第20190825期	胡一天郑元畅冰山男主来袭 火箭少女陷入恋爱难题？
第20190901期	黄明昊打卡“别人家的食堂” 天天兄弟“越琢磨乐队”首秀
第20190908期	李宇春重返十四年前出道舞台 现场教学王一博“猫爪舞”
第20190915期	王一博挑战开挖掘机 孙杨唱响中国梦
第20190922期	李沁搭档王一博现场秀水袖舞 杜江害羞回应“妻管
第20190928期	天天兄弟开启“红色之旅” 汪涵神似“闪电”给王一博做速录
第20191006期	汪涵与袁隆平院士田间话家常 王一博高天鹤在线喂猪
第20191013期	全球带货天团强势来袭 王一博挑战“榴莲味”螺蛳粉
第20191020期	毕雯珺王一博探寻米饭哲理 《中餐厅》林大厨出道大挑战
第20191027期	杨迪妈妈爆笑挑战VR游戏 天天兄弟上演剧本杀
第20191103期	黄晓明天天兄弟挑战消防员训练 王一博解锁新身份？
第20191117期	天天兄弟即兴表演恐怖故事 王一博大张伟心中最惨情歌排行
第20191124期	王一博行李箱大曝光 资深“驴友”周笔畅分享旅行趣事
第20191201期	王一博爆笑模仿岳云鹏 相声首秀获认可！
第20191208期	徐璐武艺爸爸购物车大公开
第20191215期	“王一叠”上线亲授叠衣技巧
第20191222期	拥抱一人份的快乐 王一博金莎现场自曝单身原因
第20191229期	天天咖啡馆正式营业中！王一博上演“小浣熊的诱惑”

=== 2020 ===
Date	Episode name
2020-01-05	“越琢磨乐队”遭遇成团难题 Click#15王一博现场斗舞超燃
2020-01-12	王一博给大老师贴双眼皮 金瀚展示直男式化妆术
2020-01-19	春晚金曲歌手惊艳开嗓一秒回童年！倪萍自曝曾竞选春晚总导演
2020-01-26	王一博黄豆豆《剑舞》合作 倪萍巩汉林再现春晚名场面
2020-02-02	又到一年招聘季 尚雯婕汪小菲邹市明职场BOSS组团来袭
2020-02-09	吉娜驾到 跨国夫妻恩爱那些事
2020-02-16	火神山副总指挥分享抗疫心得
2020-02-23	王一博河南话模仿硬核防疫广播 张含韵周深高能宅家配音秀
2020-03-01	天天兄弟首次挑战密室逃脱
2020-03-08	王一博挑战厨艺手撕生鸡 姜妍远程遥控钱枫下厨
2020-03-15	天天兄弟带你私宅大袭击 黄轩陈数畅聊消费观
2020-3-22	章龄之带娃上网课日常
2020-3-29	王一博在线追星表情失控！
2020-04-05	胡兵美妆教学王一博
2020-04-12	天天兄弟回忆意大利之行
2020-04-19	天天兄弟齐聚王一博缺席？
2020-04-26	天天兄弟踏青撸虎
